= United States military divers =

Underwater divers employed by the US armed forces

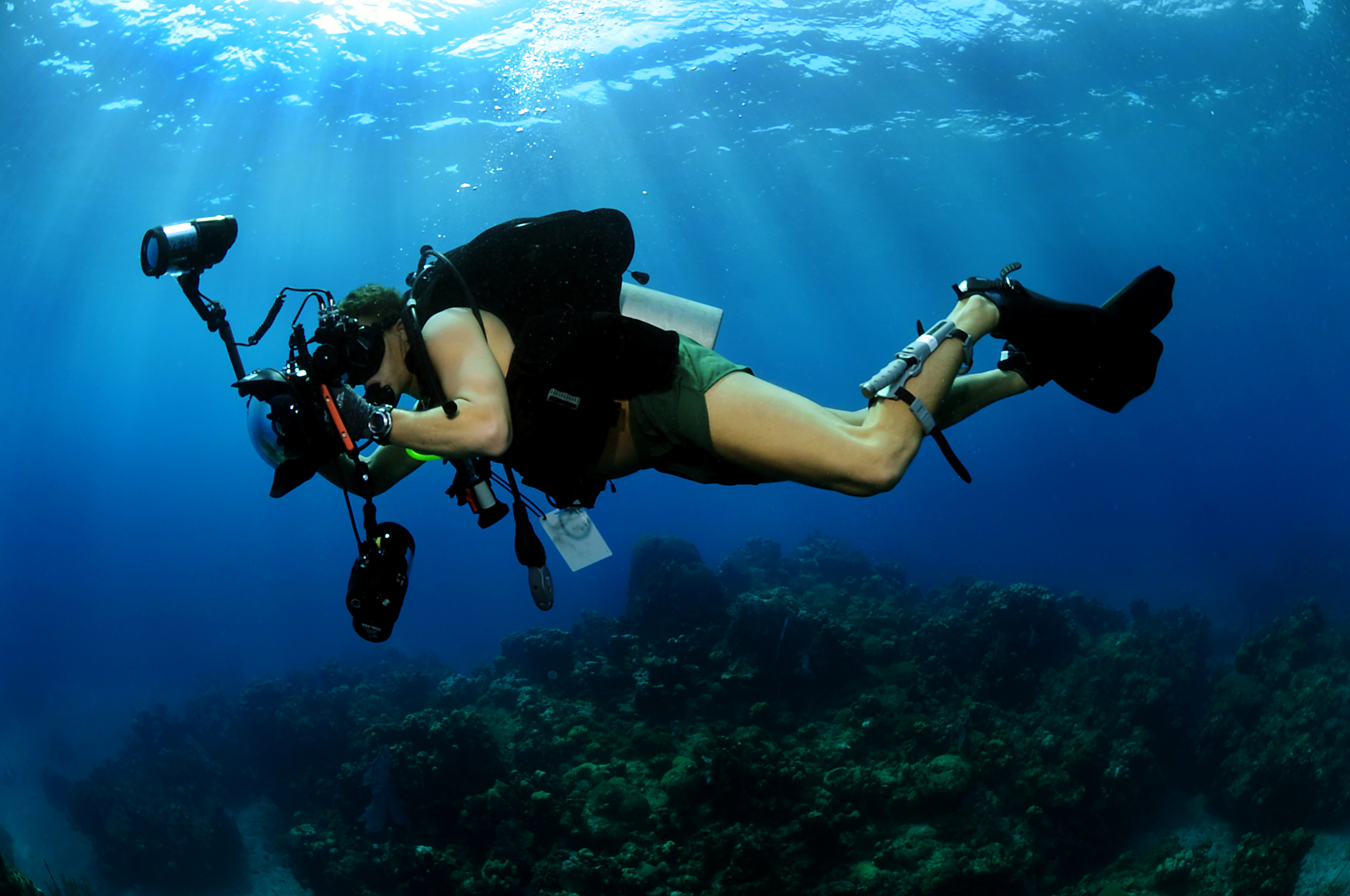
Combat Camera Underwater Photo Team – A US Navy diver during underwater photography training off the coast of Guantanamo Bay, Cuba

The US employs divers in several branches of the armed forces, including the Navy, Army, Marines, Air Force and Coast Guard.

== United States Navy ==
- Mobile Diving and Salvage Unit
- Naval Special Warfare Center trains the SEALs and some of the combat swimmers for the other U.S. military branches.
- Naval Combat Demolition Units, the first Seabee naval demolitions teams that were incorporated into the UDT's.
- Naval Special Clearance Team (NSCT) consisting of SEALs, SWCC, and EOD.
- Navy Explosive Ordnance Disposal (EOD) technicians.
- Underwater Construction Teams (UCT) – Seabees trained as Underwater Construction Technicians, primarily utilizing Scuba and surface supplied diving equipment. Additionally trained in precise demolitions.
- Underwater Demolition Teams (UDT's) – The first Seabee swimmers that transitioned post WWII to scuba frogmen that transitioned Vietnam to become the Navy SEALs.
- United States Navy Divers (non-combat divers) – ship husbandry, underwater construction, harbor clearing (except for explosive ordnance), salvage and other "underwater work".
- United States Navy SEALs – All trained as Combat Swimmers/Divers. The primary dive teams of the SEALs, called SDV Teams, use SEAL Delivery Vehicles to carry out advanced combat dive missions.

== United States Army ==
- Some Army Rangers attend the Special Forces Combat Diver Qualification Course.
- Some Delta Force operators have completed the Special Forces Combat Diver Qualification Course.
- Army Engineer Divers of Corps of Engineers – Trained in underwater construction, salvage, demolitions, hydrographic survey, hyperbaric chamber operation, beach and river reconnaissance, bridge reconnaissance, underwater cutting and welding, side scan sonar operations, mine and countermine operations, search and recovery operations and ships husbandry operations. Army divers use both surface-supplied equipment and scuba to perform their missions.
- The Special Forces (Green Berets) maintain a robust combat diving capability. One Operational Detachment-Alpha (ODA) per Special Forces Company is trained and equipped to conduct open and closed circuit sub-surface maritime infiltration operations. Special Forces combat divers, along with many combat divers from other services, attend the Special Forces Combat Diver Qualification Course, which is held at the Special Forces Underwater Operations School, Naval Air Station Key West, Key West, Florida.

== United States Marine Corps ==
The USMC Combatant Diver Course is located at the Navy Diving and Salvage Training Center, Naval Support Activity Panama City, Panama City, Florida.

- Marine Raider Regiment
- Marine Force Reconnaissance
- Marine Reconnaissance Battalions
- Maritime Special Purpose Force

== United States Coast Guard ==
Currently, United States Coast Guard Regional Dive Locker Teams are assigned to Deployable Specialized Forces, full-time diving capability for three primary missions: Ports and Waterways Coastal Security (PWCS); Aids to Navigation (ATON); and ship husbandry and repair in remote polar regions. At these units, divers perform a variety of missions, from buoy tending to science support in the polar regions and security diving operations in ports around the country. The units consist of the following: Regional Dive Locker East (RDLE), Portsmouth, Virginia; Regional Dive Locker West (RDLW), San Diego, California; and Regional Dive Locker Pacific (RDLP), Honolulu, Hawaii. Divers attached to Maritime Safety and Security Teams have the unique capability of detecting and, if necessary, stopping or arresting submerged divers, using the Underwater Port Security System. It is the only special operations group that can arrest submerged divers.

According to Record Group 226 at the National Archive, over 45 United States Coast Guard men were attached to the Office of Strategic Services Maritime Unit Operational Swimmer Groups (OSG). All OSGs had Coast Guard men, and several CG men were attached to UDT 10 in the Pacific after training with the OSS MU. LT John P. Booth (USCG) was Commanding Officer in the field of OSG 1. He was attached to OSS Detachment 101 and OSS Detachment 404 in the China and Burma and India war area where he and his team conducted reconnaissance and infiltration by sea, scouted enemy shoreline, and participated in combat swimmer and covert operations. These OSS Frogmen pioneered the use of unassisted diving techniques to include the Lambertsen Unit (allowing men to swim underwater for up to 3 hours), swimfins and the underwater compass. These men also experimented with underwater delivery systems referred to as the "Sleeping Beauty". Several of these Coast Guard/OSS Frogmen, including LT Booth, were awarded the Bronze Star for their "service with the Office of Strategic Services" by the Commanding General CBI. The combined efforts of the OSS Frogmen (Operational/Combat Swimmers), USN Scouts & Raiders, and NCDUs/UDTs, that laid the foundation for what would later become the U.S. Navy SEALS. The first OSS Frogman, according to the Naval Special Warfare Foundation was USN Petty Officer John Spence who trained at OSS Maritime Unit AREA D on the Potomac River with USN LT Jack Taylor, who is widely considered the first SEAL. Over half of the OSS Frogmen / Combat swimmers were in fact Coast Guard men sought out for their advanced swimming, diving, and boat handing skills.

As of July 2008, qualified Coast Guard officers and enlisted petty officers are permitted to volunteer for Navy SEAL training. On 21 May 2010, two Coast Guard officers graduated BUD/S class 277 and moved on to further Naval Special Warfare Training; ultimately to join active Navy SEAL teams. RADM Gary Bonelli, Deputy Commander of the Naval Special Warfare Command stated to the USCG Web journal the following:

"Naval Special Warfare is proud to team with the nation's first U.S. Coast Guard officers qualified as U.S. Navy SEALs...During the past fourteen months, they have proven their mettle and have truly earned the right to be called our teammates. Cooperation among all services is a critical component of the National Maritime Strategy. Today's graduation is just one more example of the many integral ties that bind our maritime services. Congratulations to SQT Class 277!"

== United States Air Force ==
- Pararescue (PJ), Combat Control (CCT), and Special Reconnaissance (SR), formerly Special Operations Weather Technician or Team (SOWT) personnel of the USAF, are trained in both open and closed-circuit diving. They attend the Air Force Combat Dive Course during their training.
- Some Air Force Tactical Air Control Party (TACP) members are SCUBA or Combat Diver qualified. Together with PJ/CCT personnel, they are able to operate as members of Special Forces ODAs (see above) and Navy SEAL teams on diving operations, on missions requiring subsurface infiltration, and in other waterborne operations.
- Survival, Evasion, Resistance and Escape (SERE) Specialists assigned to the SV84 Underwater Egress course have the opportunity to attend basic Navy diver training.

== See also ==
- United States diver badges – Qualification badges of the uniformed services of the U.S.
