= Special Forces Underwater Operations =

Type of US Army Special Forces combat operations

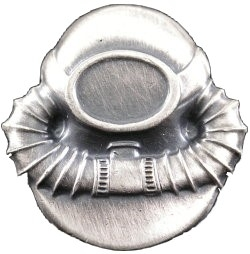
Military Scuba Diver Badge, retired in 2004

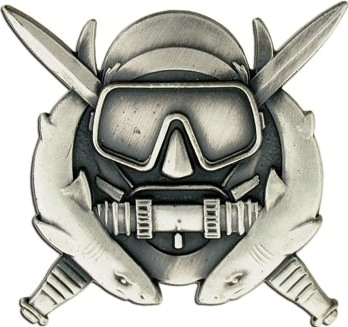
Current Army Special Operations Diver Badge

Special Forces Underwater Operations (SFUWO) is the term for United States Army Special Forces combat operations involving the use of underwater infiltration methods. These typically involve the use of closed circuit dive equipment to infiltrate a beach landing site (BLS) undetected. The US Army Special Forces, also known as the "Green Berets", have been conducting maritime operations and underwater operations since their founding in 1952. Currently, each company within a Special Forces Group mans, trains, equips, and deploys a SFUWO Operation Detachment Alpha (SFOD-A). These twelve-man teams train for SFUWO as their primary infiltration method when conducting one of their missions of unconventional warfare, direct action, counterterrorism, foreign internal defense, among others.

Special Forces Underwater Operations Training (c. 1956)

Special Forces Underwater Operations School Overview (2015) (2:52)

US Army Special Forces first existed within the Office of Strategic Services (OSS) Operational Groups. Army Green Beret Combat Divers were first in the OSS Maritime Unit. The Lambertsen Amphibious Respiratory Unit (LARU) was the first closed-circuit re-breather adopted by the US Military and used in Combat Operations with the OSS MU. It was invented by Dr. Christian Lambertsen. Army Special Forces have been conducting these operations for nearly seventy years. The Army Special Forces fielded Special Operations Combat Divers with detachments conducting SFUWO in the early and mid 1950s, nearly a decade prior to the creation of the Navy SEALs. Archival footage from this time period depicts an Army Special Forces detachment conducting advanced underwater operations including underwater infiltration, submarine lockout procedures, and underwater demolition.

== Special Forces Underwater Operations School ==
The US Army Special Forces founded the Special Forces Underwater Operations School in Trumbo Point Annex, Naval Air Station Key West, in 1964. Prior to that SF Detachment-Alphas were receiving disparate levels of dive training at their respective groups. SFUWO makes up C Company of the 2nd Battalion, 1st Special Warfare Training Group at the US Army John F. Kennedy Special Warfare Center and School.

Army, Navy, Air Force, and Marine Corps personnel have previously attended the Combat Diver Qualification Course (CDQC), the seven week course that trains special operators to conduct SFUWO in a combat environment. With a cadre of instructors primarily made up of Army Special Forces, along with a smaller number of Army Rangers, Navy SEALs, and Air Force pararescuemen and combat controllers, CDQC was formerly a standard part of the Air Force pararescue and combat control training pipelines (prior to the opening of the USAF Combat Diver Course in Panama City, FL), and both Tactical Air Control Party and Special Reconnaissance (formerly Special Operations Weather Teams) have also attended CDQC to become qualified in special warfare maritime operations.

== See also ==
- Army engineer diver
- United States Marine Corps Combatant Diver Course
- Underwater Construction Teams
- Military diving
- Uniform Service Diver Insignia (United States)
