= United States Air Force Combat Dive Course =

USAF Combat Dive Course
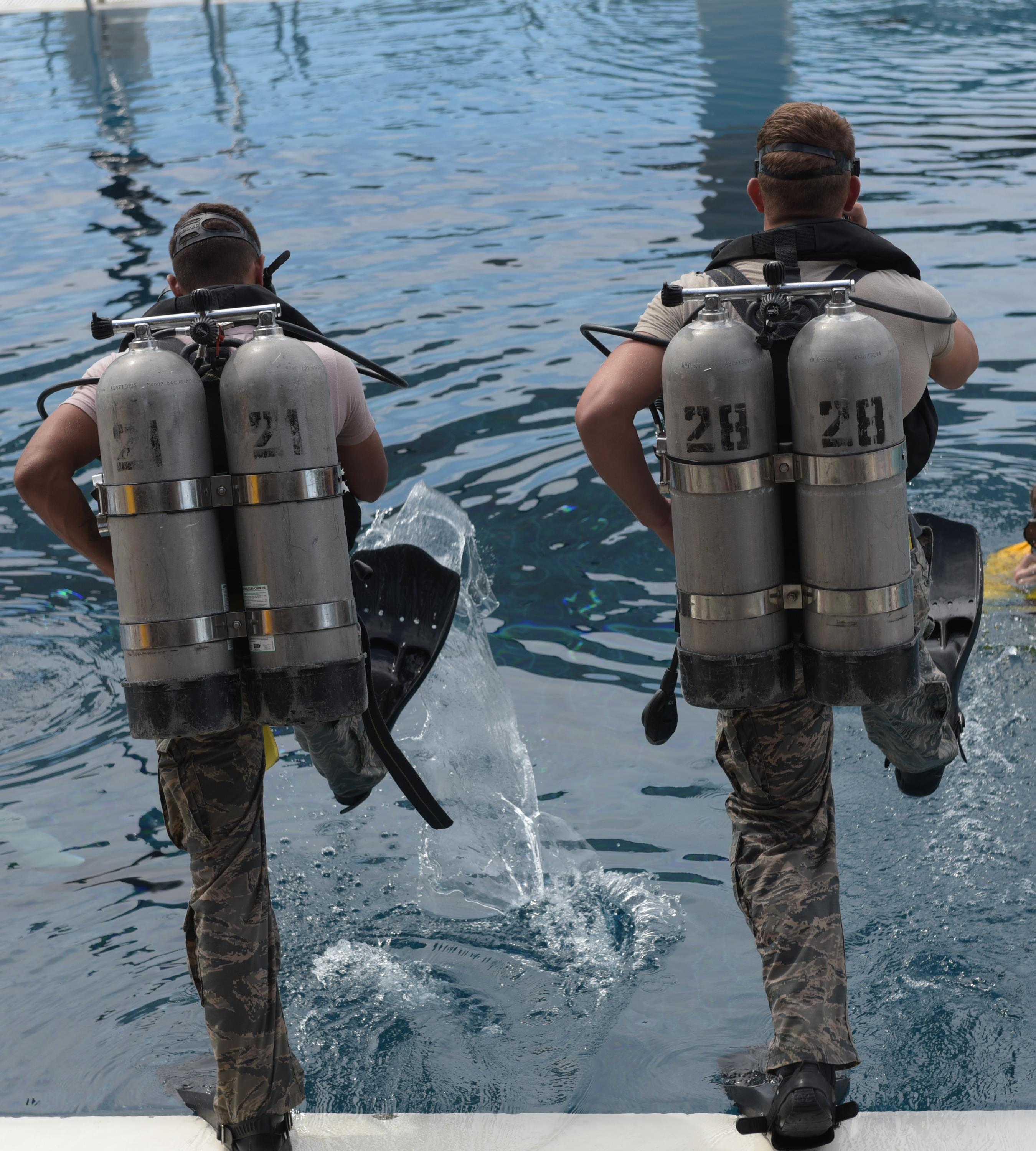
- Air Force Combat Diver students prepare to enter the water to practice the use of different dive equipment
- Active: 2006–present
- Country: United States
- Branch: United States Air Force
- Role: Combatant-diver training
- Part of: Air Education and Training Command
- Garrison/HQ: Naval Support Activity Panama City

Insignia
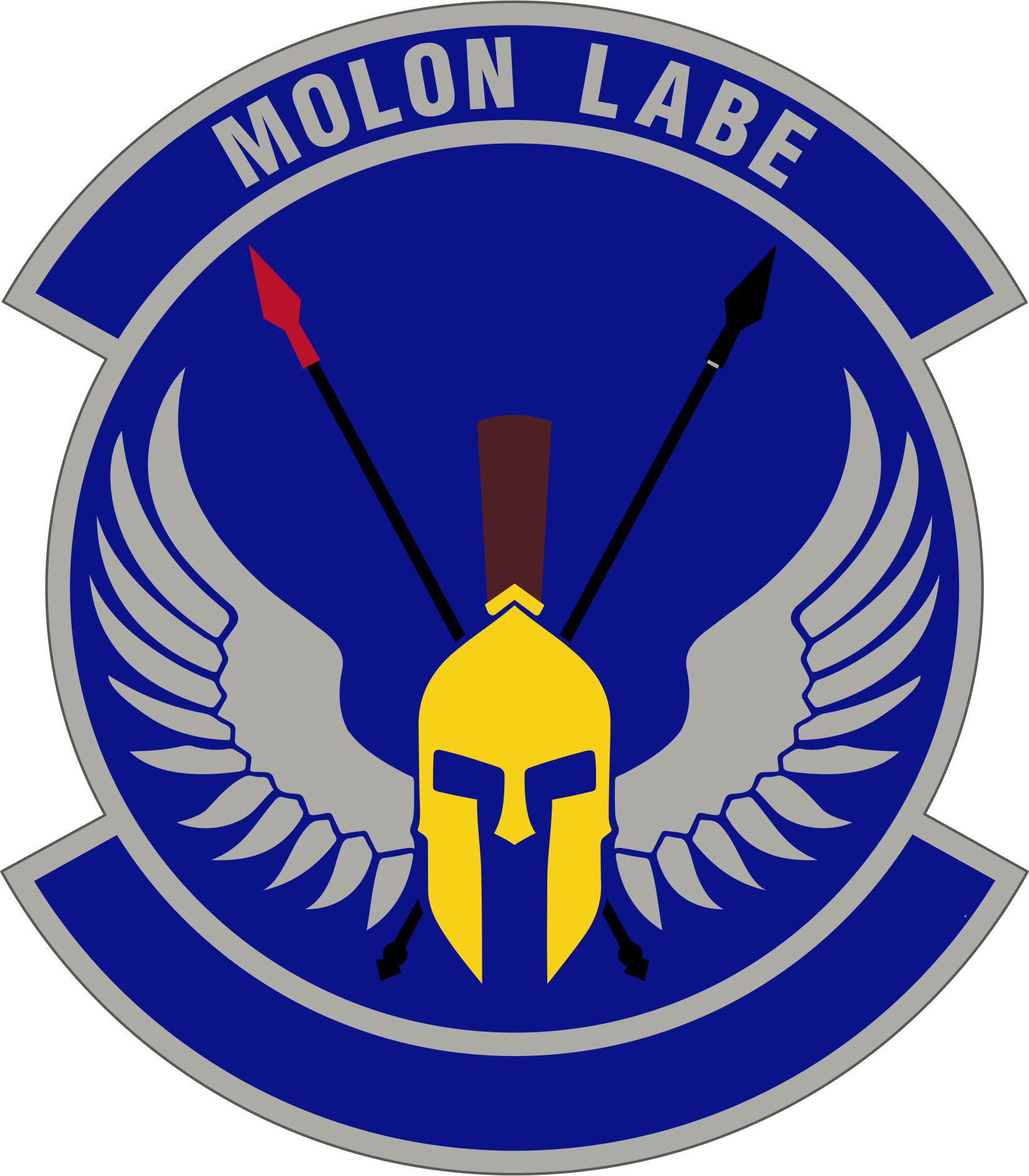
- 350th Special Warfare Training Squadron

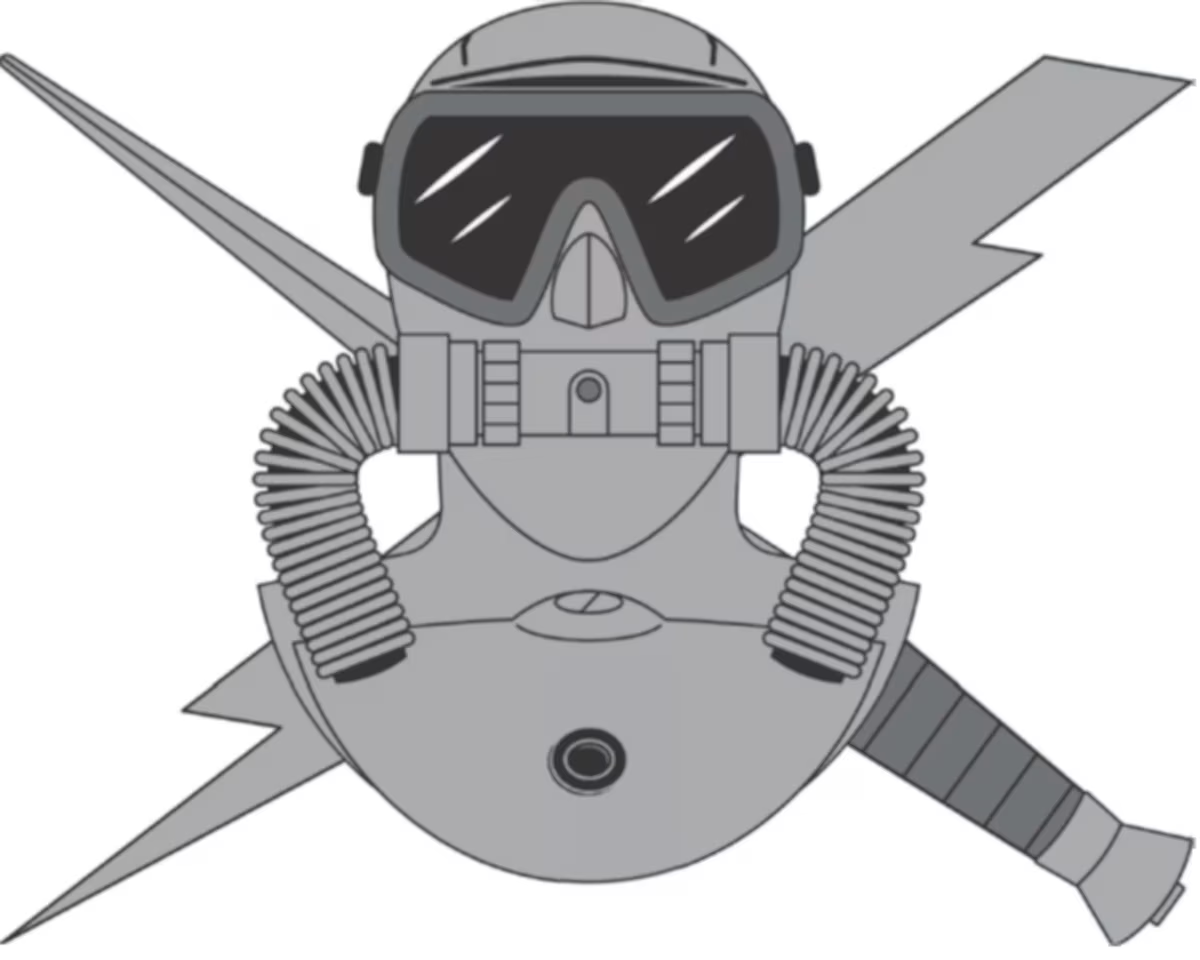
- Badge awarded upon graduation

The United States Air Force (USAF) Combat Dive Course is a military diving training course established in 2006; as of 17 October 2018 the course is taught by personnel of Detachment 1, 350th Special Warfare Training Squadron, Special Warfare Training Wing, Second Air Force, Air Education and Training Command. From 2 June 2016 to 16 October 2018, the course was taught by personnel of Detachment 1 of the 350th Battlefield Airmen Training Squadron, Battlefield Airman Training Group, 37th Training Wing. From 2006 to 1 June 2016, the course was taught by personnel of Detachment 2, 342nd Training Squadron. The course is held at the Navy Diving Salvage and Training Center, Naval Support Activity Panama City, Florida, and trains USAF Pararescuemen, Combat Rescue Officers, Combat Controllers, Special Reconnaissance (formerly SOWT) personnel, and Special Tactics Officers to conduct and participate in special operations diving missions.

During the course, students are trained to conduct personnel recovery and special operations diving missions. However, the primary focus of the USAF Combat Diver Course is to develop special operations Airmen into competent, capable, and safe combat divers/swimmers. This course provides diver training through classroom instruction, extensive physical training, surface and subsurface water confidence pool exercises, pool familiarization dives, day/night tactical open water surface/subsurface infiltration swims, open circuit/closed circuit diving procedures and underwater search and recovery procedures.

Graduates of the course are authorized by the USAF to wear the USAF Combat Dive Badge on their utility and dress uniforms. Prior to the 2022 introduction of the USAF Combat Dive Badge, Airmen were awarded the Navy's basic SCUBA badge upon graduation.

== History of USAF diving ==
=== Pararescue ===
The earliest operations that required USAF personnel to conduct subsurface diving were those conducted by Pararescuemen (PJs) assigned to the Aerospace Rescue and Recovery Service (ARRS) mission. As early as the 1960s, Corona Satellite payload recoveries frequently necessitated "parascuba" jumps, where rescue personnel would parachute into the open ocean with scuba equipment on in order to secure the sensitive information before it sank. As uncrewed space missions increased and evolved to crewed space flight, Pararescue personnel provided rescue and recovery support to many NASA programs, such as the Mercury, Gemini, Apollo, and Space Shuttle missions.

Until 1974 all PJs attended US Navy dive training but changing standards in Navy dive training led the community to migrate to the US Army Special Forces Combat Diver course. Attendance continued until the formation of the USAF Combat Dive Course in 2006.

From these origins, diving became a standard part of Pararescue Civil and Combat Search and Rescue capabilities. Sub-surface personnel and sensitive item recoveries continue to be performed by PJs around the world and infil/exfil diving capabilities are maintained by those assigned to Special Tactics Squadrons.

=== Combat Control ===
While select Combat Control (CCT) personnel that worked with sister service combat dive teams attained diving qualifications as early as 1973, dive training did not become a standard part of the CCT skillset until the 1980s. Though some CCT divers did attend the dive portion of BUDS in the 1970s, most CCT divers attended either the U.S. Army Combat Diver Qualification Course or the Marine Corps Combatant Diver Course until the USAF opened its own course in 2006

== Lineage ==
Before the Battlefield Airmen Training Group was activated on 2 June 2016, the USAF Combat Dive Course was conducted by personnel of Detachment 2, 342nd Training Squadron.

As of 17 October 2018 the course is taught by personnel of Detachment 1, 350th Special Warfare Training Squadron, Special Warfare Training Group, Special Warfare Training Wing, Second Air Force, Air Education and Training Command.
