= United States diver badges =

Qualification badges of the uniformed services of the U.S.

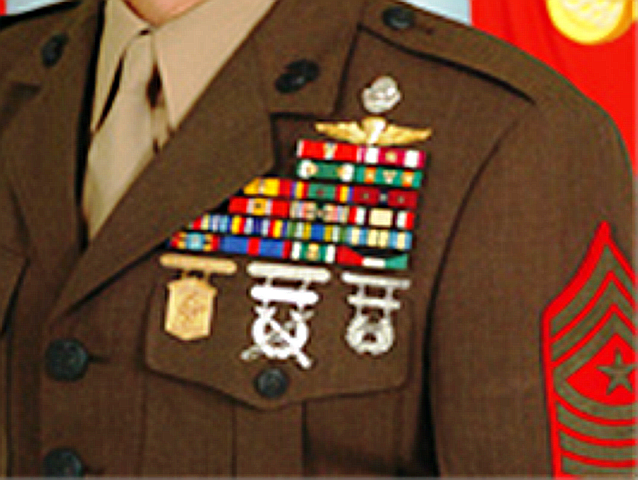
Example of the Scuba Diver Insignia on a USMC service uniform

The various diver badges (also known as "diver insignia", "dive badges/insignia," and colloquially known as "dive bubbles") of the uniformed services of the United States are badges awarded to service personnel once they have graduated an appropriate diving course. The badges' origins lie in the cloth patch decoration worn by United States Navy divers on the upper-portion of the enlisted service uniform's left sleeve during the first part of World War II, when the rating insignia was worn on the right sleeve. When enlisted rating insignia were shifted to the left sleeve in late World War II, the patch shifted to the upper right sleeve. The Navy transitioned to a metal breast insignia (with cloth breast insignia for utility and battle uniforms) in the late 1960s, with the other services following suit over the following decades.

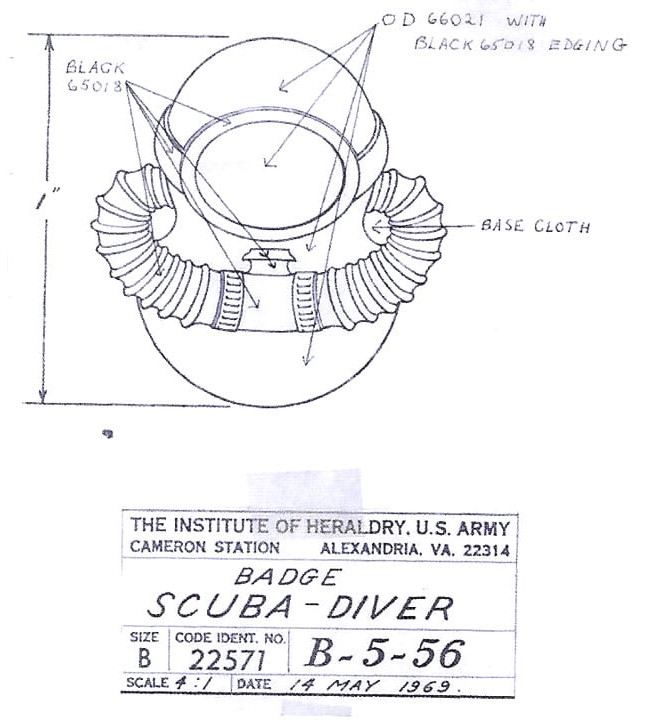
Photograph of The Institute of Heraldry's authorization for the first US military scuba diver badge (1969)

Currently, the United States Army, United States Navy, and United States Air Force all issue diver insignia and badges denoting varying degrees of qualification and also generally permit the wearing of each other's diver insignia. The United States Marine Corps issues its own diver insignia in a single degree and Marine Corps personnel are eligible to earn and wear most of the Navy's dive badges (Navy personnel are also eligible to earn and wear the Marine Corps' unique dive insignia). The United States Coast Guard also issues a single unique diver insignia (in a single degree) but its personnel are also eligible to earn and wear most Navy dive badges. The United States Space Force does not issue a unique diver insignia and most of its personnel are not afforded the opportunity to earn such badges from sister services (except via prior service), although the insignia are authorized for wear on Space Force uniforms. The National Oceanographic and Atmospheric Administration Commissioned Officer Corps is the only non-armed service of the uniformed services to issue a unique diver insignia; the Commissioned Officer Corps also authorizes all earned armed services badges (to include all diver insignia) to be worn on NOAA uniforms. The remaining uniformed service, the United States Public Health Service Commissioned Corps (USPHSCC), does not issue a unique diver insignia; however, USPHSCC personnel are authorized to wear most badges earned from another uniformed service on appropriate USPHSCC uniforms, to include diver badges.

== United States naval services ==
Joint diver insignias used by the U.S. Navy, U.S. Marine Corps, and U.S. Coast Guard

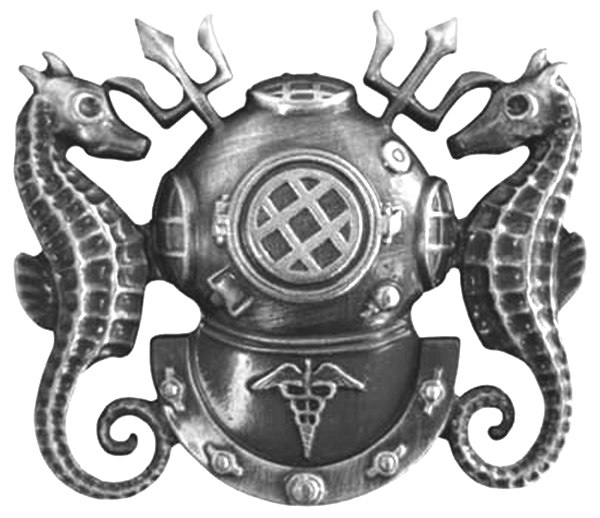
Navy & Coast Guard Diving Medical Technician Insignia

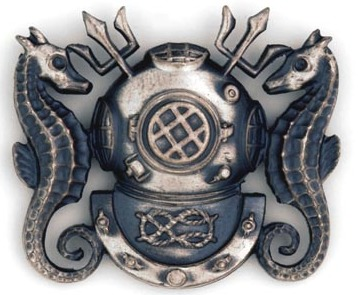
Master Diver Insignia

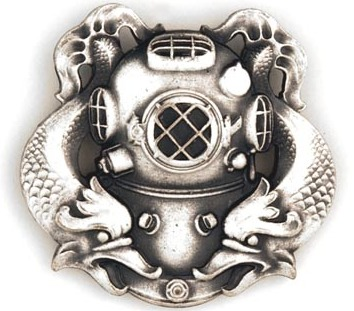
First Class Diver Insignia

Second Class Diver Insignia

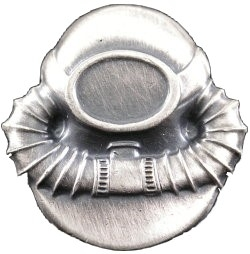
Scuba Diver Insignia

Branch-specific diver insignia of the U.S. naval services

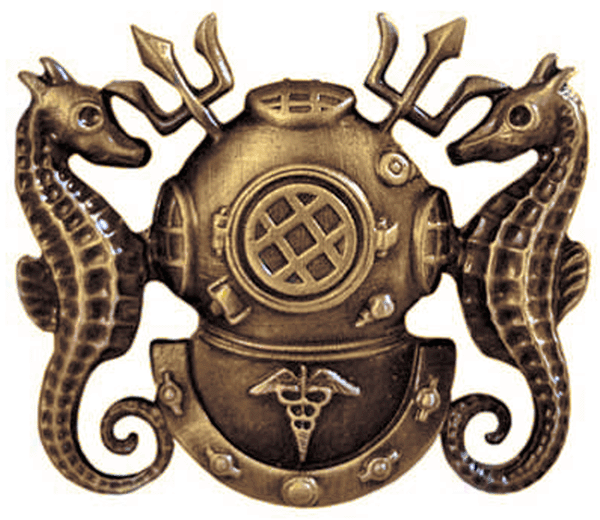
Navy Diving Medical Officer Insignia

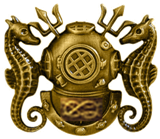
Navy & Coast Guard Diving Officer Insignia

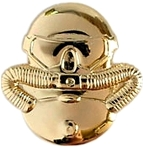
Marine Corps Combatant Diver Insignia

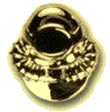
Coast Guard Scuba Diver Officer Insignia

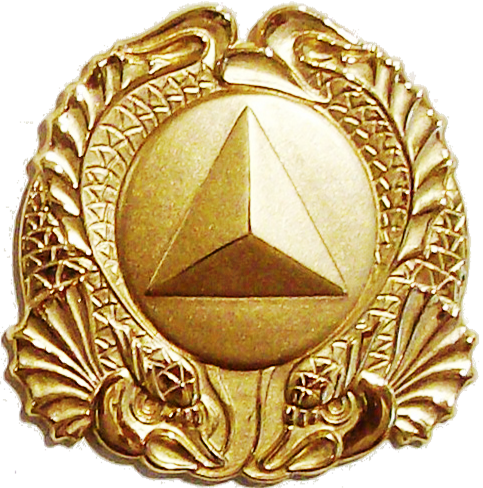
NOAA Diver Insignia

United States naval diver insignias are awarded, per degree of qualification, to sailors, Marines, and Coast Guardsmen. The elementary naval diver insignia is the Scuba Diver Insignia, awarded upon qualifying as a basic naval diver. Previously, the Scuba Diver Insignia was awarded in two degrees, one for officers and one for enlisted. The Navy eliminated the Scuba Diver Officer insignia in the 1990s, but it remains in service within the Coast Guard. The silver-colored insignia features an old-fashioned diving mask and open-circuit breathing apparatus.

In 2001, the Marine Corps authorized the creation of a new badge, the Combatant Diver Insignia, attesting to the wearer's closed-circuit rebreather and reconnaissance combat diver training; the gold-colored combatant diver insignia depicts a wetsuit hood, low-profile diving mask, and chest-mounted rebreather.

The naval deep sea diver qualification insignia are awarded in four degrees: second-class diver; first-class diver; master diver; and diving officer. However, the Marine Corps does not award the Diving Officer Insignia to its officers. In the Navy, the master diver is the most qualified diver; he must be a chief petty officer before applying to attend the master diver course.

The Diving Medical Officer Insignia and the Diving Medical Technician Insignia are awarded to naval medical personnel qualified as divers or medical technicians, respectively. The Diving Medical Insignia resembles the Master Diver Insignia, but is decorated with a caduceus. The Diving Medical Officer Insignia is gold in color while the enlisted version—the Diving Medical Technician Insignia—is silver in color. Since the Marine Corps and the Coast Guard have no organic medical officers, they do not issue the Diving Medical Officer Insignia. However, like all medicine, the Marine Corps is served by US Navy Diving Medical Officers and Diving Medical Technicians. The Diving Medical Officers attend their own training course that often has Air Force, Army, and foreign doctors all who, upon completion, wear the Navy Diving Medical Officer insignia. The enlisted Diving Medical Technicians attend the same course as Navy divers training to become second-class divers, but with slight changes to the curriculum for medicine. They enter that class having already trained as Navy hospital corpsmen.

Like the Navy's surface, submarine, and aviation enlisted specialties, dive-qualified enlisted personnel place a term after the sailor's rating; for example, if Petty Officer Second-Class Jones is dive-qualified, he is referred to, in writing, as PO2 (DV) Jones.

The only non-armed service of the United States that awards diver badges is the National Oceanic and Atmospheric Administration Commissioned Corps (NOAA Corps). NOAA Corps officers qualified as NOAA divers may wear the NOAA Diver Insignia after authorization by the Director of the NOAA Corps. The NOAA Diver Insignia is a gold-colored pin consisting of a NOAA Corps device surrounded by two dolphins.

== United States Army ==
US Army diver badges
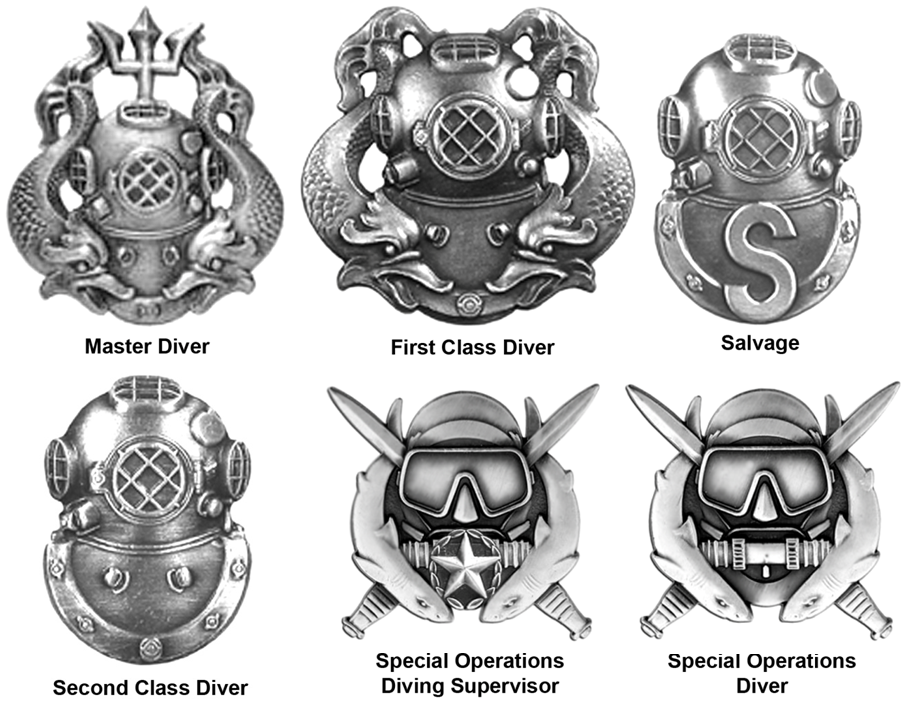
- Type: Badge
- Presented by: United States Army
- Status: Currently awarded

Precedence
- Next (higher): Flight surgeon badge
- Next (lower): Explosive ordnance disposal badge

The United States Army issues two different types of diver badges, one for Army engineer divers and one for Army special operations divers. Army engineer diver badges are awarded in four degrees (second-class diver, salvage diver, first-class diver, and master diver) while Army special operations diver badges are awarded in two degrees (diver and diving supervisor). The second-class and first-class diver badges are identical to those issued by U.S. naval forces. The Army does not issue officer or medical diver badges; however, Navy-awarded Diving Officer Insignia, Diving Medical Officer Insignia, and Diving Medical Technician Insignia are authorized for wear on Army uniforms with written approval from the United States Army Human Resources Command.

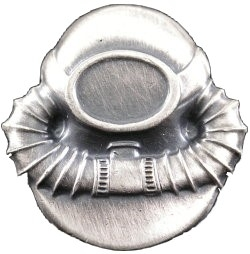
Original Army Scuba Diver Badge, worn by US naval services

On 17 September 2004, the Scuba Diver Insignia/Badge was discontinued in lieu of a new Special Operations Diver Badge and an additional grade, the Special Operations Diving Supervisor Badge, was created. Prior to this change, the Scuba Diver Insignia/Badge was the same for all of the U.S. armed forces. The new design includes sharks, symbolizing speed, stealth, and lethal efficiency, and two Fairbairn-Sykes fighting knives in saltire, representing the heritage of OSS operational swimmers during World War II. The Army Combat Diver Qualification Course and Army Combat Diving Supervisors Course are taught by Company C, 2nd Battalion, 1st Special Warfare Training Group at the Special Forces Underwater Operations School, Naval Air Station Key West.

== United States Air Force ==
US Air Force dive badges

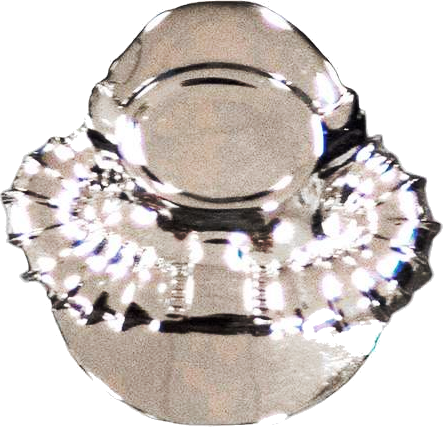
Former Air Force scuba diver badge

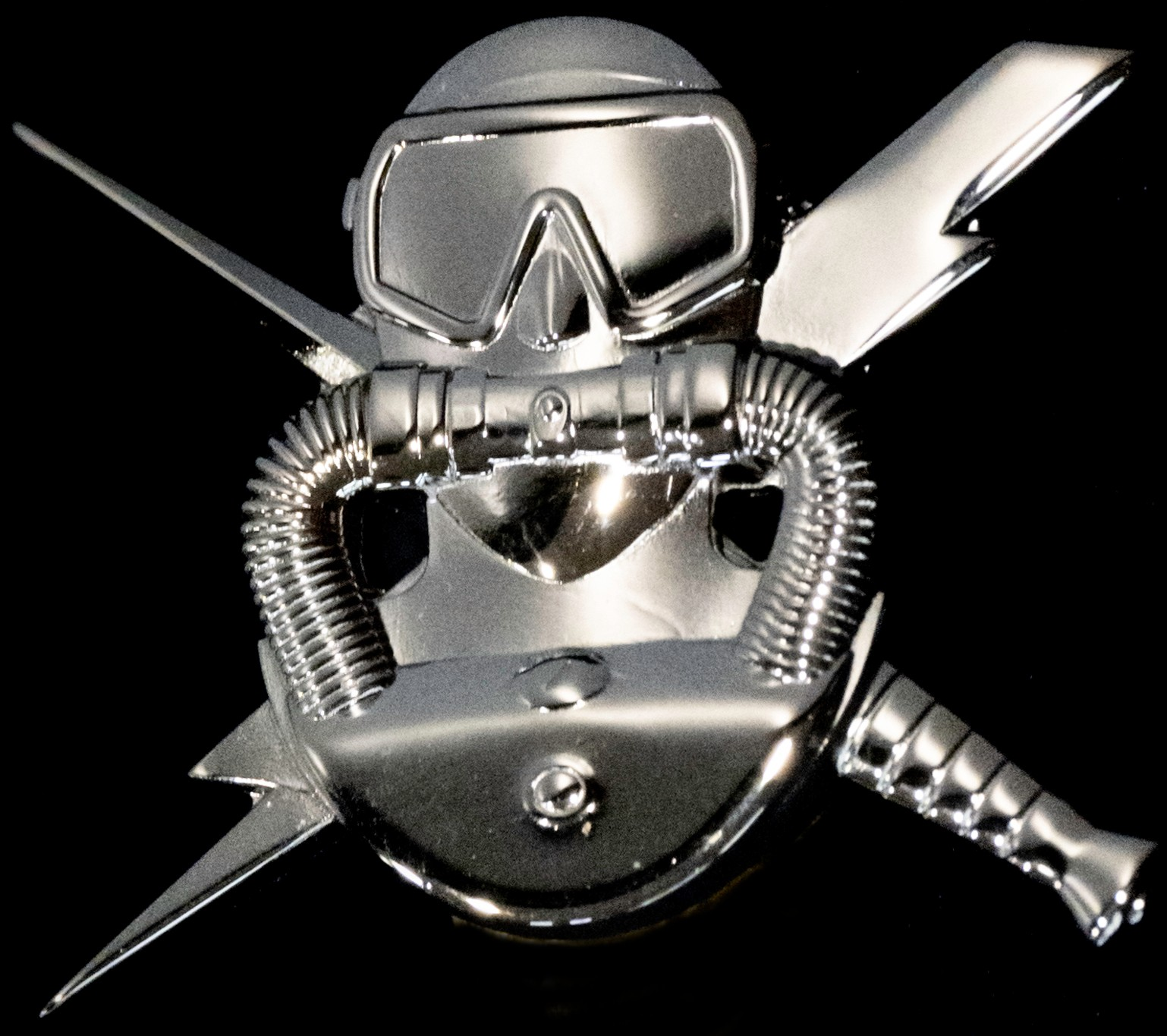
Current Air Force combat dive badge

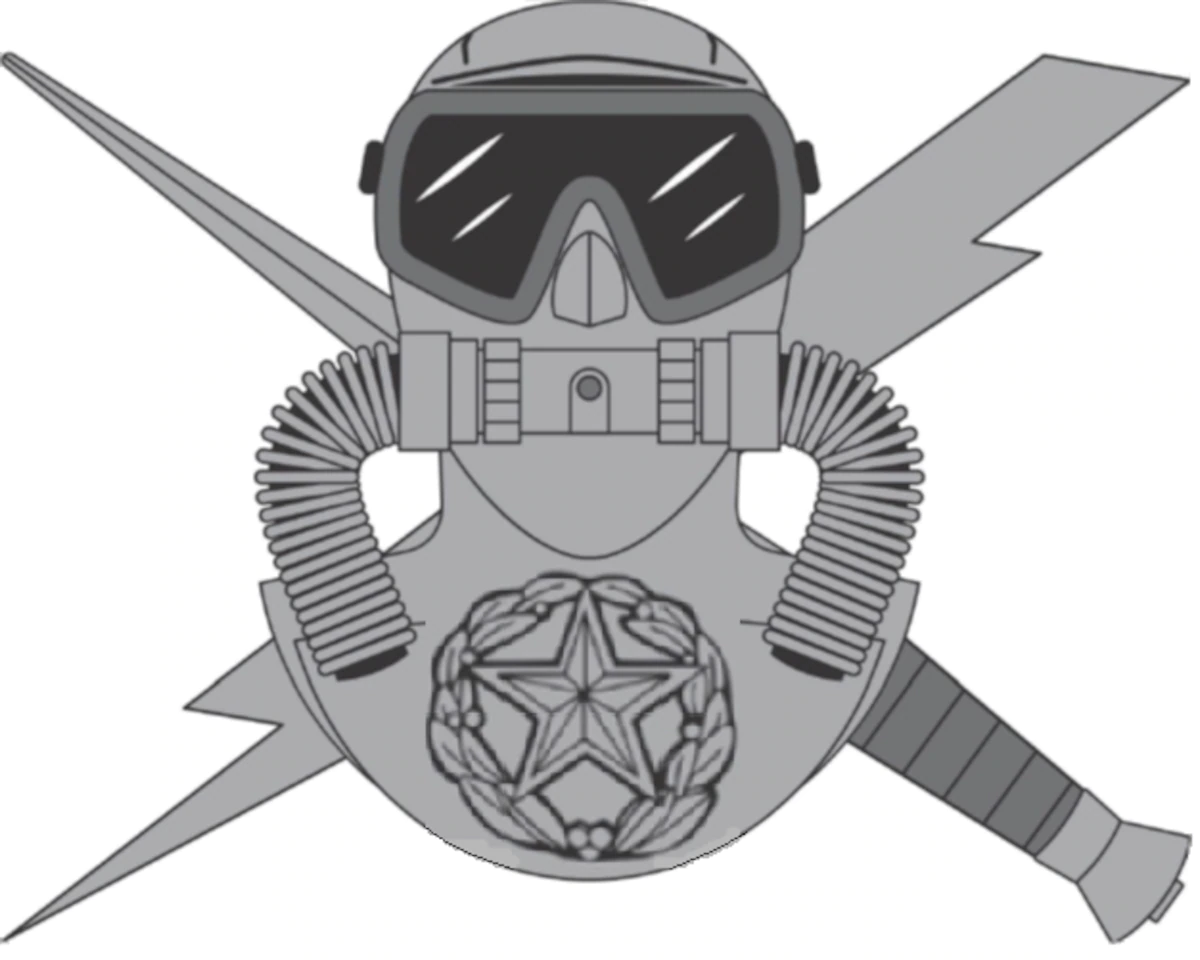
Current Air Force combat dive supervisor badge

The United States Air Force issues the Air Force combat dive badges to graduates of the Air Force Combat Dive Course at the Navy Diving Salvage and Training Center, Naval Support Activity Panama City.

Until the establishment of the US Air Force Combat Dive Course in 2006, special operations Airmen attended either the U.S. Army Combat Diver Qualification Course, or the U.S. Marine Corps Combatant Diver Course. Airmen attending such courses were awarded the U.S. Navy's basic scuba diver insignia. The USAF Combat Dive Course would award the same basic scuba diver insignia until 2022. Badges awarded from sister-service combat diver courses, as well as other U.S. Navy dive courses (Diving Medical Officer, etc.) are authorized for wear on U.S. Air Force uniforms.

In October 2022, the United States Air Force approved the new Air Force specific diver badges for graduates of the Air Force Combat Dive Course, replacing their previous use of the U.S. Navy's basic scuba diver insignia.

== See also ==
- United States aircrew badges
- United States astronaut badges
- United States aviator badges
- United States balloon pilot badges
- United States recruiter awards
- United States military divers – Underwater divers employed by the US armed forces
- Badges of the United States Air Force – Military badges of the U.S. Air Force
- Badges of the United States Army – Military decorations issued by the United States Department of the Army
- Badges of the United States Coast Guard
- Badges of the United States Marine Corps – Military badges of the U.S. Marine Corps
- Badges of the United States Navy – Military badges of the US Navy
- Military badges of the United States
- Awards and decorations of the National Oceanic and Atmospheric Administration
- Obsolete badges of the United States military
