= Center for Explosive Ordnance Disposal & Diving =

One of eleven learning centers of U.S. Naval Education and Training Command

Center for Explosive Ordnance Disposal and Diving (CENEODDIVE)
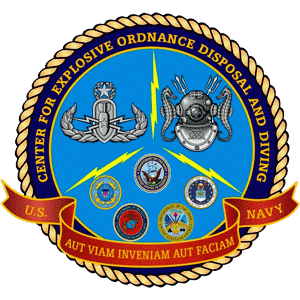
- Active: November 2001 - present
- Country: United States
- Branch: United States Navy
- Type: NETC Learning Center
- Role: oversight and control of the career progression of Navy EOD Technicians and Divers
- Part of: Navy Installations Command
- HQ: Naval Support Activity Panama City, Panama City, Florida
- Mottos: Aut viam inveniam aut faciam I will find a way, or make one
- Website: www.netc.navy.mil/centers/csf

Commanders
- Commanding Officer: CAPT Jim Turner
- Executive Director: Mr. George Delano, SES
- Command Master Chief: CMDCM (SW/DSW) Stephen J. Mulholland

The United States Navy Center for Explosive Ordnance Disposal and Diving (CENEODDIVE) is one of the eleven learning centers responsible for training explosive ordnance disposal technicians and divers in the United States. CENEODDIVE is stationed on Naval Support Activity Panama City (NSA PC) in Florida and forms a part of the Naval Education and Training Command. With the exception of the Great Lakes learning site, CENEODDIVE is the only inter-service learning center.

== Naval Diving and Salvage Training Center (NDSTC) ==
The Naval Diving and Salvage Training Center (NDSTC) located at NSA Panama City is the largest diving facility in the world and trains military divers from all services. It trains more than 1200 students each year in 23 different courses. Students include candidates for submarine SCUBA, U.S. Navy Deep Sea Divers, Seabee Underwater Construction Divers, Joint Service Diving Officers, Explosive Ordnance Disposal (EOD) Technicians and Officers, Diving Medical Technicians, Diving Medical Officers, U.S. Army Engineer Divers, U.S. Marine Corps combatant divers, U.S. Coast Guard Divers, and U.S. Air Force Pararescue Operators and Combat Controllers. A limited number of U.S. law enforcement, U.S. government agencies, and students from allied and coalition nations also train at NDSTC.

NDSTC houses 23 certified diver life support systems, which include 6 hyperbaric recompression chambers, 2 diving simulation facilities capable to 300 feet (91 m), an aquatics training facility which is the second-largest pool in the U.S., a submarine lock-out trunk and two 133 feet (41 m) Yard Diving Tenders (YDT) for open ocean diving support (with recompression chambers and mixed gas diving capabilities).

== Naval School Explosive Ordnance Disposal (NAVSCOLEOD) ==
Naval School Explosive Ordnance Disposal (NAVSCOLEOD) is located at Eglin Air Force Base in Okaloosa County, Florida. It is a Navy-led, jointly staffed (Army, Navy, Air Force, Marine Corps) school that provides the high-risk specialized, basic and advanced EOD training to United States, partner nations and selected US Government civilian personnel.

=== History ===
Before World War II, the US Navy had no formal Explosive Ordnance Disposal (EOD) program. Incidents and accidents were handled by the best-qualified ordnance personnel available. Early in World War II, because of the high casualty rate, it became obvious to the British that a need existed for a corps of skilled technicians to render safe or dispose of an increasing number of unexploded ordnance items which presented hazards to their people and operations.

Shortly before the United States' entry into World War II, an agreement was reached with the British government whereby a nucleus of U.S. Naval officers and enlisted personnel would work with the British units in the field and subsequently bring the skills back home. When this group returned, the decision was made to provide formal Explosive Ordnance Disposal training in the United States. In June 1941, the first Mine Disposal Class was convened at the Naval Gun Factory, Washington, DC. In December of the same year, the Bomb Disposal School was also established at the Naval Gun Factory. The Bomb Disposal School was later moved to American University. The Advanced Mine School stayed at the Gun Factory (Washington Navy Yard) until it moved to the Naval Receiving Station, Anacostia, in 1942. The school was renamed the Mine Disposal School on October 21, 1943. In November 1945, the two schools were combined and established at the Naval Powder Factory, Indian Head, Maryland.

In 1947, responsibility for Explosive Ordnance Disposal training for all services was delegated to the United States Navy, and officers and enlisted of all services were added to the staff. This relationship flourished, and as the performance of the newly formed Explosive Ordnance Disposal Technicians improved, the demand for their unique talents increased. By 1958, facilities required to meet these increased requirements were met by the dedication of Surface and Nuclear Training Buildings. Subsequently, a half-million-gallon diving pool (underwater training facility) was constructed expanding the capability of the school to train naval officers and enlisted personnel in the peculiarities of EOD diving. In late 1971, the Department of Defense consolidated the EOD Training and Technology Programs under the single managership of the Navy. This action, along with improving the training of the EOD technicians, resulted in the establishment of district organizations by the other services at NAVSCOLEOD and the creation of the DOD EOD Technical Training Acceptance Board.

To meet increased requirements for trained Explosive Ordnance Disposal technicians, as well as to support expanding curriculum requirements, the chief of naval operations Admiral James D. Watkins, on 1 October 1985, established the Naval School, Explosive Ordnance Disposal Detachment at Eglin Air Force Base, Florida. Construction of these facilities began in October 1986 and was officially opened for business on 24 June 1988. On 15 November 1996, a groundbreaking ceremony was conducted at Eglin AFB. Construction began on the $16.2 million military construction project which, on completion, would provide the facilities for all the basic EOD training at Eglin.

Today the consolidated Explosive Ordnance Disposal (EOD) Training Facility supports the Department of Defense Joint Service EOD training mission. This military construction project centralizes all basic EOD training at Eglin AFB, Florida. The consolidation saves the DoD $4.3 million in annual recurring costs. The project provided for five new buildings totaling 117,000 square feet at a cost of $16.2 million. In addition, a current Chief of Naval Education and Training (CNET) Technology Infusion Project is underway which will upgrade our curriculum delivery technology with state-of-the-art computer-based hardware and software.

=== Training requirements ===
Prospective Navy EOD techs undergo screening while in recruit training. Candidates who pass basic eligibility screening will advance to preparatory training at Naval Station Great Lakes where swimming and physical conditioning will occur. Candidates will then continue to NDSTC in Panama City for nine weeks of dive training, before beginning EOD training at NAVSCHOLEOD.
