= Coast Guard Station Panama City =

US Coast Guard station in Florida

- Part of 8th District
- Naval Support Activity Panama City in Panama City, Florida.

Site information
- Type: Coast Guard Station

Location
- Coordinates: 30.16984°N 85.75667°W

Site history
- In use: October 1971 – present

United States Coast Guard Station Panama City is a United States Coast Guard station located on Naval Support Activity Panama City in Panama City, Florida. It is the home port for the United States Coast Guard Cutter Coho.

History

United States Coast Guard (USCG) Station Panama City is co-located on Naval Support Activity Panama City in Panama City Beach, Florida. It is the home port for the USCG Cutter Coho. USCG Station Panama City is a medium-sized search and rescue station in the USCG's 8th District. The 8th District is headquartered in New Orleans and is responsible for USCG operations spanning 26 states, including the Gulf of Mexico coastline from Florida to Mexico, the adjacent offshore waters and outer continental shelf, as well as the inland waterways of the Mississippi, Ohio, Missouri, Illinois, and Tennessee River systems.

The station was established in 1933 at St. Andrew's Marina, was later moved to Alligator Bayou in October 1971 and was moved again to its present location in November 1990. The station has two 45’ Response Boat Medium vessels, one 29’ Response Boat Small II, and one 24’ Special Purpose Craft Shallow Water to carry out its search and rescue, law enforcement, and environmental protection missions. The USCG Station's specific duties include controlling traffic in illegal drugs, enhancing the safety of commercial shipping and associated port facilities and waterways, and maintaining maritime aids to navigation in the area. Other duties include protecting coastal waters from the threat of pollution, maintaining abundant fisheries in our waters, and promoting boating safety.

The station's area of responsibility extends 50 mi (80 km) offshore and stretches 168 mi (270 km) of coastline from Lake Powell in the west, to St. Marks River in the east. This large area also incorporates 40 bayous, 18 rivers, 16 bays, 3 sounds, 2 lakes, and 107.5 statute miles of Intra-coastal Waterway. The station is billeted for 28 active-duty USCG personnel, 21 reservists and seven Coast Guard auxiliary flotillas.

The station is also the host command for Aids to Navigation Team Panama City, a marine safety and an electronic support detachment.

Eastern Shipbuilding Group, Inc.

The station has two 45’ Response Boat Medium vessels, one 29’ Response Boat Small II (RBS), and one 24’ Special Purpose Craft Shallow Water (SPC-SW). On September 15, 2016, Eastern Shipbuilding Group, Inc., landed a $10.5 billion contract to build two dozen new U.S. Coast Guard cutters. At a cost of around $484 million per ship, it's the largest contract the Coast Guard has ever awarded in its 226-year history. Eastern Shipbuilding was selected to finalize its design and construct the first series of nine Offshore Patrol Cutters to replace the Medium Endurance Cutters currently in service. The contract is initially for nine vessels with options for two additional vessels.

The Coast Guard program goal is to build 25 Offshore Patrol Cutters having a potential total contract value in excess of $10 billion. Since 2008, Eastern has spent more than $75 million in upgrading and expanding its facilities and shipbuilding capabilities to continue growing and meeting the needs of its commercial and government customers. Eastern Shipbuilding was awarded this contract because of their past success of building 149 out of 150 ships on time and on budget since 2002, Eastern's performance record is unmatched. Eastern Shipbuilding also went through a bidding process to receive this contract and they out bid their competitors, Eastern's design includes the following features: Length 360 ft (110 m); Width 54 ft (16 m); Speed in excess of 22 kn (41 km/h; 25 mph); Capable of carrying an MH-60R or MH-65 Helicopter; Capable of carrying three OTH small boats. The vessel also includes a highly sophisticated combat system and C4ISR communication suite which will allow the Coast Guard to continue to support and execute the Coast Guard's missions.

The significance of the Eastern Shipbuilding contract comes from the fact that Eastern Shipbuilding Group is a shipbuilder based in Panama City, Florida that operates facilities in the Florida Panhandle in Panama City, Allanton, and Port St. Joe. This leads to a drastic positive effect on the economy of Panama City and puts the Panama City coast guard as the closest coast guard station to the Eastern Shipbuilding factories.

Hurricane Michael

Hurricane Michael was the first Category 5 hurricane to strike the contiguous United States since Andrew in 1992. In addition, it was the third-most intense Atlantic hurricane to make landfall in the contiguous United States in terms of pressure, behind the 1935 Labor Day hurricane and Hurricane Camille of 1969.

Facts of Hurricane Michael

Michael was the first Category 4 storm on record to make landfall in the Florida Panhandle. It was also the first major hurricane (Category 3 or above) to strike the Florida Panhandle since Hurricane Dennis in 2005. After Michael was downgraded Wednesday afternoon, it became the first Category 3 hurricane to hit Georgia since 1898. A wind gust of 130 mph was reported near Tyndall AFB, close to Panama City, before the instrument failed. Only three major hurricanes made landfall in the Panhandle since 1950 before this: Eloise in 1975, Opal in 1995 and Dennis in 2005. Hurricane Michael, with 155 mph (249 km/h) winds at landfall, is the strongest storm to make landfall in the continental US since Hurricane Andrew in 1992. The "forecast cone" for Michael (the storm's projected path) stretched from Florida all the way north to Maryland. Before Michael made landfall, about 30 million people were under a hurricane watch or warning, or tropical storm watch or warning, across six states (Florida, Alabama, Mississippi, Georgia, South Carolina and North Carolina). Michael is the seventh hurricane of the year in the Atlantic Basin. On average, the Atlantic has about five hurricanes by October 8. Its tropical-storm-force wind speeds stretch for more than 320 miles—equal to the distance between New York City and Pittsburgh.Florida has had more hurricanes in October than in any other month. Hurricane Michael rapidly intensified by 45 mph (72 km/h) in the 24 hours leading up to landfall.

Panama City Coast Guard Damage

Although this compact, 86-year-old facility was able to resume essential operations within 24 hours of Hurricane Michael's landfall, the installation and its small staff of 100 Coast Guardsmen and women still face a long-term struggle to fully recover from the storm. Preliminary inspections had found that 50 percent of the structures had been destroyed or damaged beyond repair. 4 Months later that had risen to 80 percent. Several buildings that appeared structurally sound had sustained serious water damage and mold, to the point that engineers determined it more efficient and less costly to demolish and rebuild.

Engineers have estimated it will cost tens of millions to replace the destroyed buildings and lost equipment at the Coast Guard station, which is still a tiny fraction of the anticipated $3 billion cost to rebuild Tyndall Air Force Base.

As of May 1 the infrastructure loss is estimated at 85 percent, with just 15 percent left standing. Cement slabs are now all that remains where buildings once stood and trailers take the place of offices.
