= Underwater demolition =

Deliberate destruction of underwater obstacles

Underwater demolition is the deliberate destruction or neutralization of man-made or natural underwater obstacles, both for military and civilian purposes.

== History ==
=== Charles Pasley ===
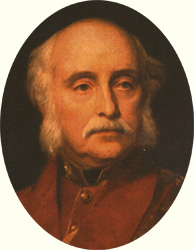
Sir Charles Pasley

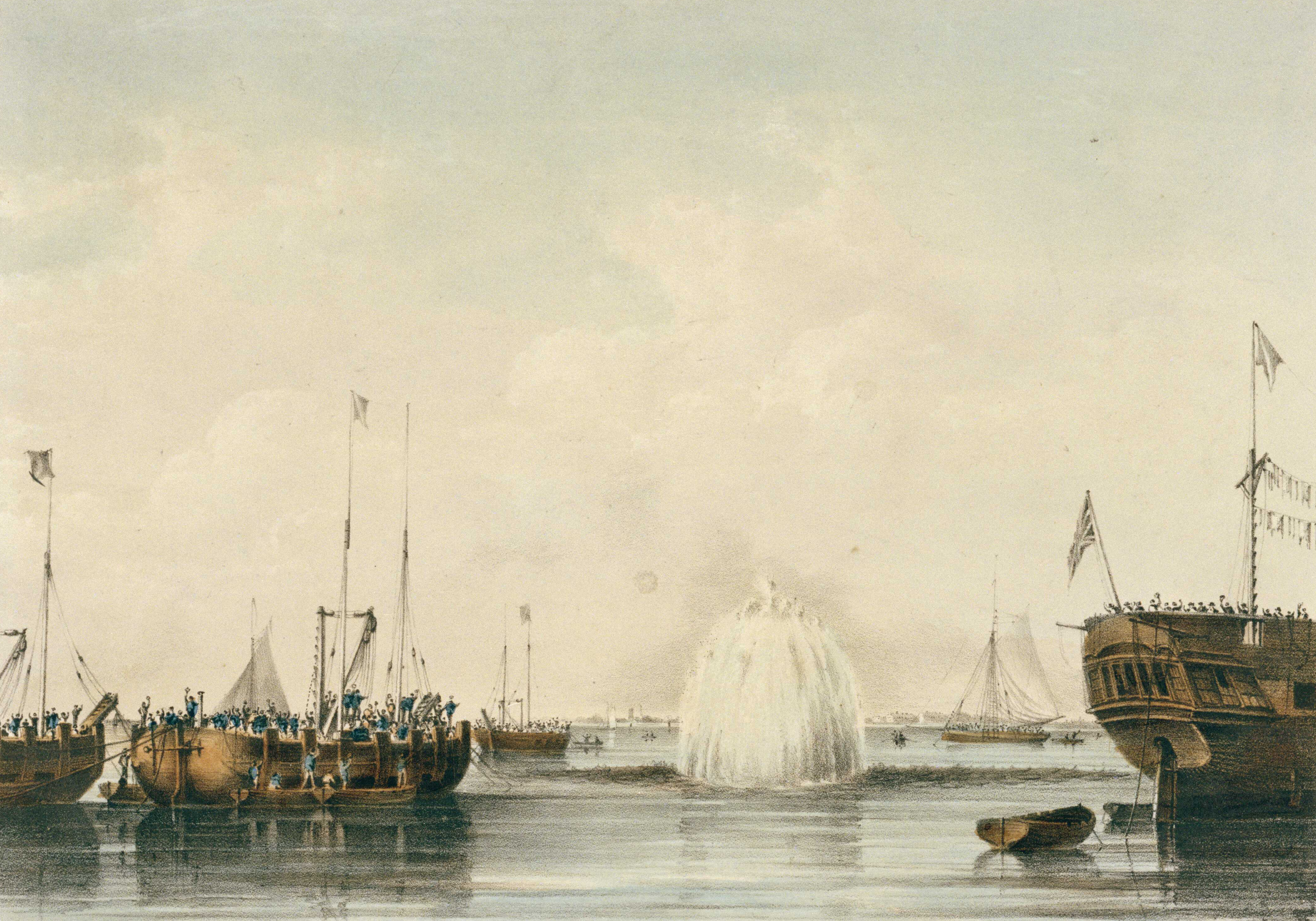
The underwater explosion of a large cylinder of gunpowder against HMS Royal George's wreck on 23 September 1839

In 1839 Charles Pasley, at the time a colonel of the Royal Engineers, started operations to break up the wreck of HMS Royal George, a 100-gun first rate launched in 1756, which sank at moorings at Spithead in 1782, and then salvage as much as possible using divers. Pasley had previously destroyed some old wrecks in the Thames to clear a channel using gunpowder charges. The charges used were made from oak barrels filled with gunpowder and covered with lead. They were initially detonated using chemical fuses, but this was later changed to an electrical system using a resistance-heated platinum wire to detonate the gunpowder.

Pasley's operation set many diving milestones, including the first recorded use of the buddy system in diving, when he ordered that his divers operate in pairs. In addition, a Corporal Jones made the first emergency swimming ascent after his air line became tangled and he had to cut it free. A less fortunate milestone was the first medical account of a diver squeeze suffered by a Private Williams. The early diving helmets used had no non-return valves, which meant that if a hose was severed near the surface, the high-pressure air around the diver's head rapidly evacuated the helmet, causing a large pressure difference between the surrounding water and the remaining gas, with extreme and sometimes life-threatening effects. At the British Association for the Advancement of Science meeting in 1842, Sir John Richardson described the diving apparatus and treatment of diver Roderick Cameron following an injury that occurred on 14 October 1841 during the salvage operations.

In 1840, the use of controlled explosions to destroy the wreck continued through to September. On an occasion that year the Royal Engineers set off a huge controlled explosion which shattered windows as far away as Portsmouth and Gosport.

Meanwhile, Pasley had recovered 12 guns in 1839, 11 more in 1840, and 6 in 1841. In 1842 he recovered only one iron 12-pounder, because he ordered the divers to concentrate on removing the hull timbers rather than search for guns. By 1843 the whole of the keel and the bottom timbers had been raised and the site was declared clear.

Benjamin Maillefert and Julius H. Kroehl were active in underwater demolition in the US around the time of the civil war.

=== John G. Foster ===
Shortly after the American Civil War, Brevet Maj. Gen. John G. Foster, a West Point trained engineer, became one of the first acknowledged experts in underwater demolition. In 1869, he wrote a definitive treatise on the topic and became widely recognized as the authority on underwater demolition. Many of his theories and techniques were still in practice during the Spanish–American War and World War I.

=== Christian J. Lambertsen ===
In 1940, Christian J. Lambertsen demonstrated his semi-closed circuit rebreather, the Lambertsen Amphibious Respiratory Unit (LARU), for the U.S. Navy in connection with his proposal for the formation of military teams of underwater swimmers.

Major Lambertsen served in the U.S. Army Medical Corps from 1944 to 1946 where he did a detached service in underwater operations with the Office of Strategic Services (OSS). After joining OSS, he was vital in establishing the first cadres of U.S. military operational combat swimmers during late World War II.

His responsibilities included training and developing methods of combining self-contained diving and swimmer delivery for the OSS "Operational Swimmer Group". Following World War II, he trained U.S. forces in methods for submerged operations, including composite fleet submarine / operational swimmers activity.

=== Draper L. Kauffman ===
In June 1943, Draper L. Kauffman organized the first U.S. Navy Demolition Teams. The original purpose of these teams was to map and record conditions in amphibious landing zones and to demolish obstacles in water which would prevent vehicles from landing during invasions.

Underwater demolition specialists may still be referred to as underwater demolition teams. Various special operations units use aspects of demolition diving. Most prominently carried out by Navy SEALs and UCT divers.

== Methods ==
The methods used for dismantling and clearing structures underwater include hydraulic cutting, oxy-arc cutting, oxyacetylene cutting, Jackhammers, hydraulic breakers, explosives, non-explosive demolition agents (expanding grout), submersible diamond wire saws and ultra high pressure water jetting.

Expanding grout is a cement that expands on curing, producing extremely high pressure, in the order of 18,000 pounds per square inch (120 MPa) when confined in a hole drilled in a brittle material such as concrete or rock, causing it to crack without large movements, noise, dust or major shock waves.

== Applications ==
Underwater demolition has similar civilian and military applications. Piecemeal wrecking of a shipwreck, also called wrecking in place, is the dismantling of the whole or parts of a wreck in situ, usually when it is not possible or economically viable to salvage it, and it is a navigational hazard or must be removed for some other reason. Removal and disposal of the ship's contents, such as cargo, stores, and equipment may be required before the structure is demolished.

The usual methods for underwater wrecking in place are manual flame cutting by divers and surface workers, mechanical demolition using heavy lift cranes, explosive sectioning, dispersal, or flattening, and burial or settling by hydraulic dredging.

Demolition of damaged or otherwise redundant coastal structures, such as bridges, jetties, breakwaters or harbours, and clearing of natural or artificial obstructions to waterways, may include underwater demolition.

== Environmental impact and safety ==
Bubble screens can be used to keep large marine animals away from blasting and other sources of loud noise. The bubbles will also absorb some of the blast energy and sound, but their effectiveness is unproven.

== Research ==
Research into diver safety related to underwater blast continues at the US Naval Submarine Medical Research Laboratory.

== See also ==
- Underwater Demolition Team – US Navy special operations group
- Underwater Construction Teams – Navy construction battalion underwater construction units
- Clearance diver – Navy diver specialised in explosives
- Frogman – Tactical scuba diver
- Defense against swimmer incursions – Methods of protection from incursions by divers and swimmers
