= Diving salvage warfare specialist =

Diving salvage warfare specialist is a United States Navy special warfare rating.

The diving salvage warfare specialist program is for active and reserve fleet diving communities. The program designation signifies a United States Navy diver has excelled in competency and professionalism, and formally recognizes initiative, technical competence, and readiness for increased responsibility.

== See also ==
- List of United States Navy ratings
