= Army engineer diver =

Armed forces occupation

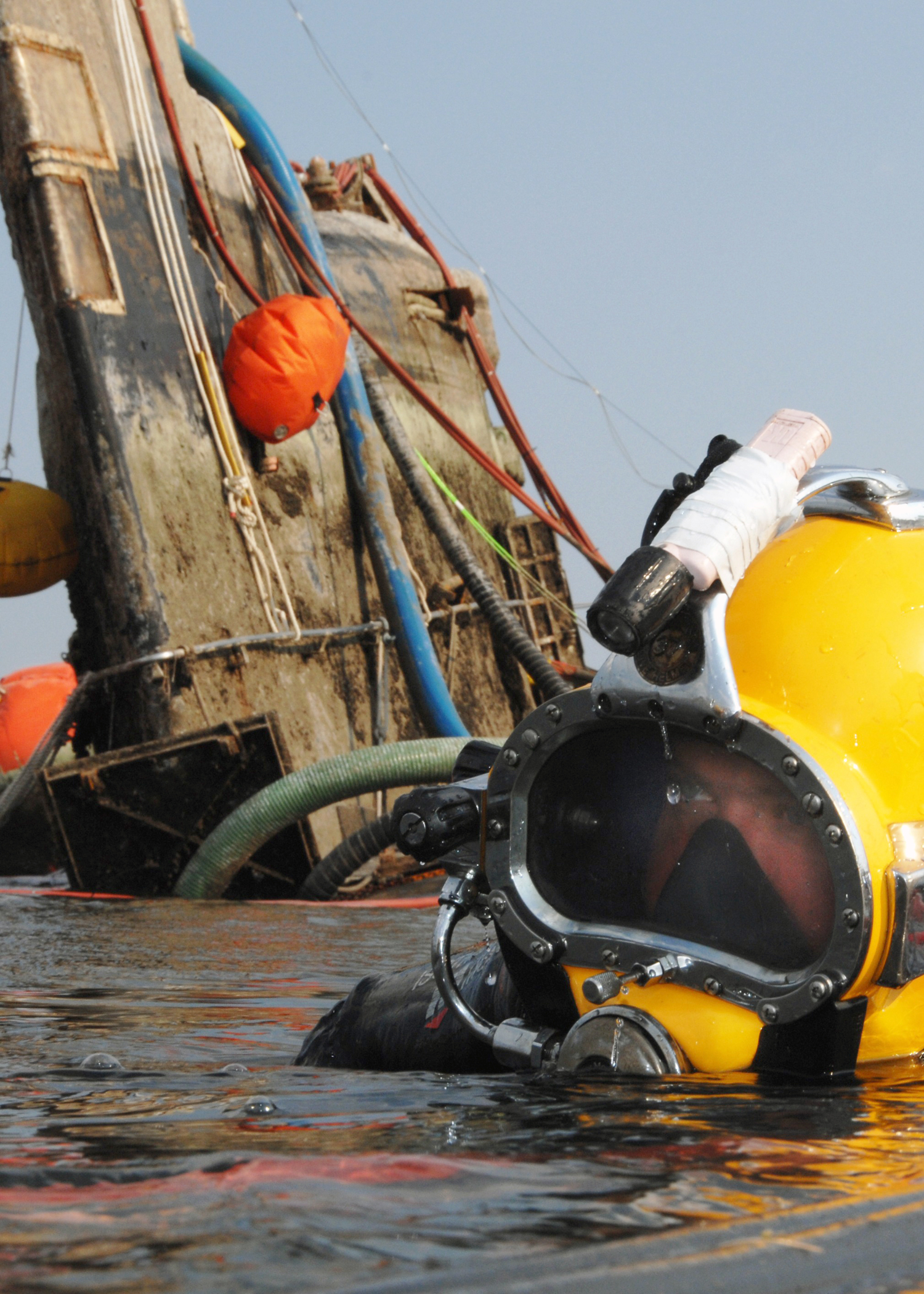
A U.S. Army Diver surveys the "sail" of a Soviet era submarine during a joint Army/Navy submarine salvage operation in the Providence River, Providence, RI, July 26, 2008.

Army engineer divers are members of national armies who are trained to undertake tasks underwater, including reconnaissance, demolition, and salvage. These divers have similar skills and qualifications as professional divers. Army divers use both surface supplied "Hard hat" and SCUBA to perform their missions. In the United States Army, they are members of the Corps of Engineers. In the British Army, they may be Royal Engineer Divers or Commando Engineer Divers.

== Description ==
Army's 7th Engineer Dive Detachment

Army engineer divers are members of national armies. Army engineer divers are trained in underwater construction, salvage, demolitions, hydrographic survey, hyperbaric chamber operation, beach and river recon, bridge recon, underwater cutting and welding, side scan sonar operations, mine and countermine operations, and search and recovery operations. They are also training in ships husbandry operations. These divers have similar skills and qualifications as professional divers.

== Notable operations ==
=== Port-au-Prince, Haiti, 2010 ===
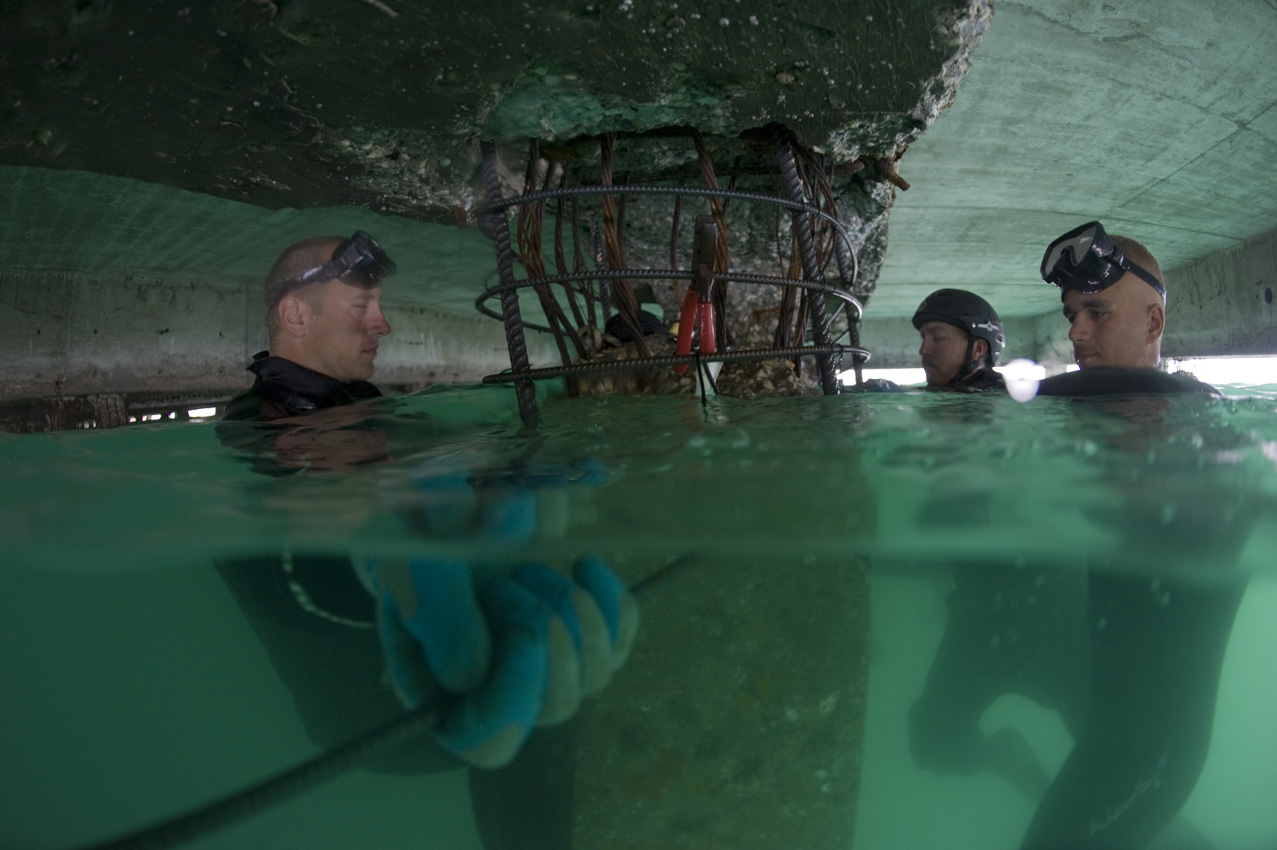
Army Divers work to repair a portion of the main port in Haiti.

The earthquake of January 12, 2010, that left thousands of Haitians dead or homeless and hungry, rocked Haiti's main port of Port-au-Prince. Shockwaves sent the port's busy northern pier and its two massive cargo cranes sinking into the sea. The harbor was littered with toppled shipping containers. The southern pier was sheared from its concrete support pilings. The U.S. military worked with Haitian authorities to offload seaborne humanitarian aid and commercial cargo as it helped run the port. At the heart of its plans was an effort to repair the remains of the southern pier, leaving Haiti with a vital avenue for humanitarian aid and commerce.

== Equipment ==
Depending on situation they may use: Diving helmets used for surface-supplied diving, or Full-face diving masks used with surface supplied and scuba equipment or Scuba diving equipment is generally used for dives requiring high mobility.

== Physical fitness test ==
Diving medical personnel evaluate the fitness of divers before operations begin and are prepared to handle any emergencies which might arise. They also observe the condition of other support personnel and are alert for signs of fatigue, overexposure, and heat exhaustion.

== Common duties ==
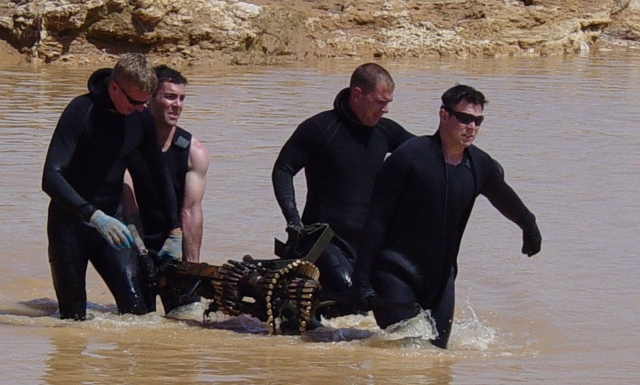
Equipment Recovery

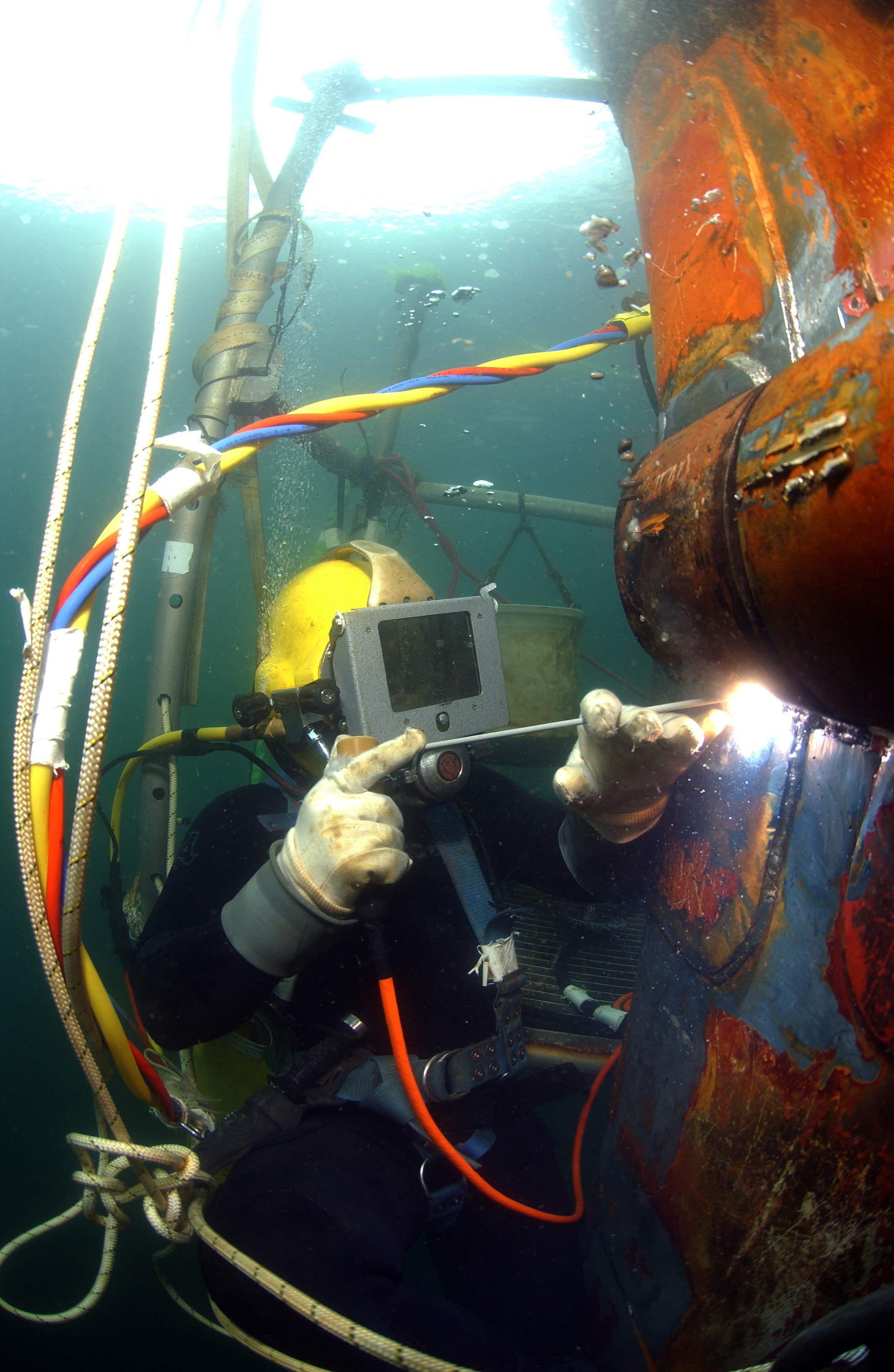
Underwater Welding

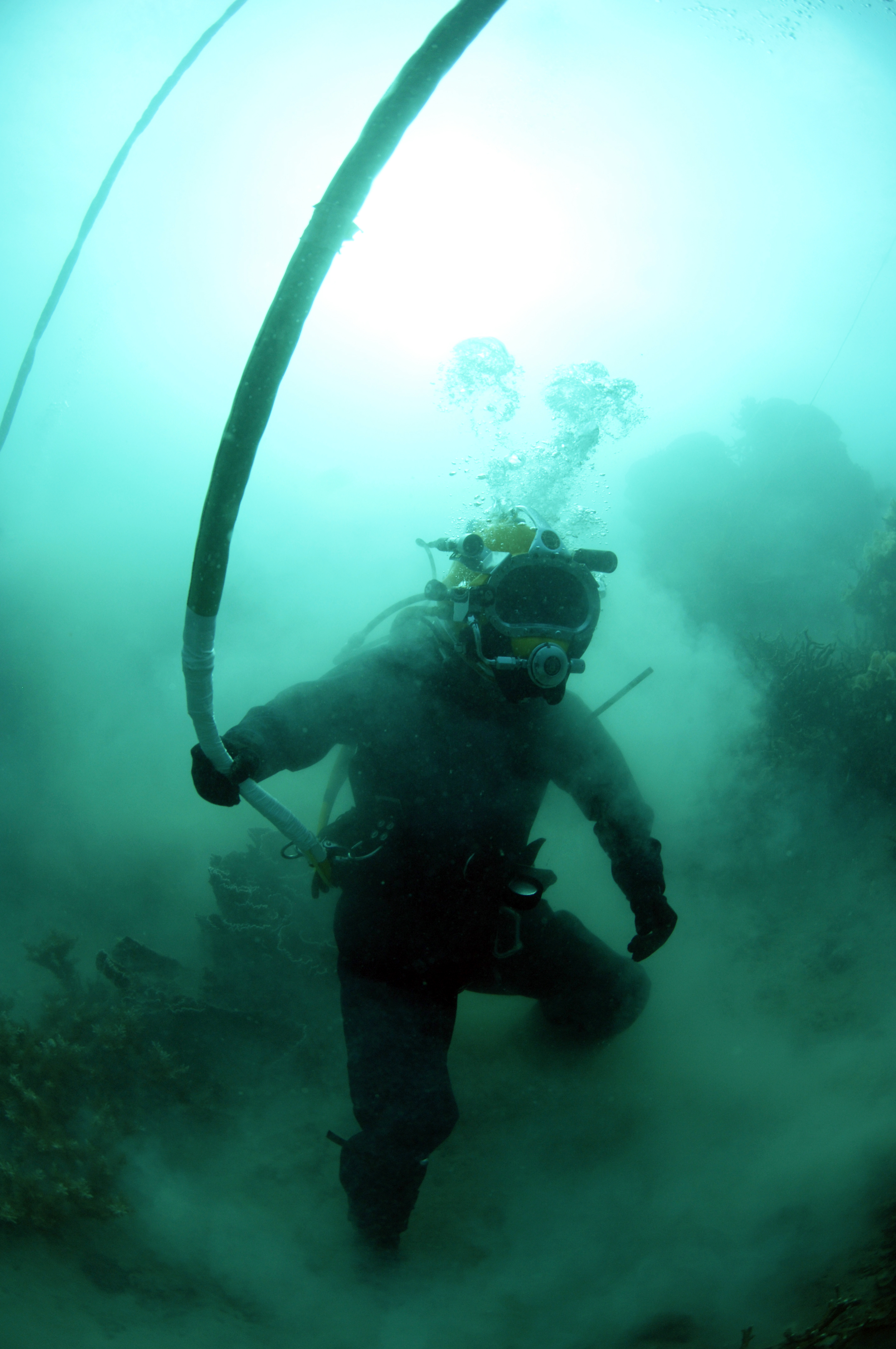
Harbor Clearance

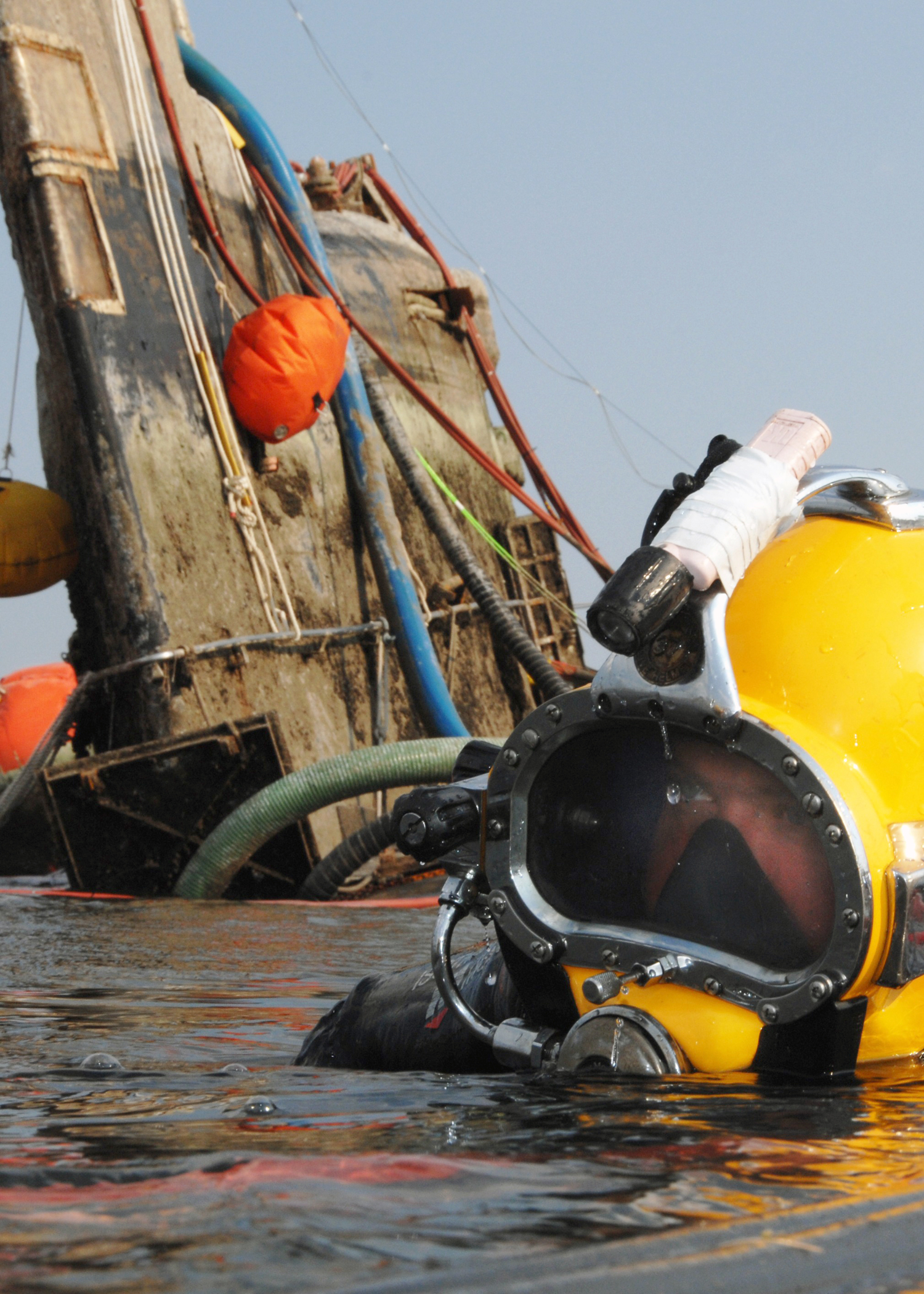
Salvage Operations

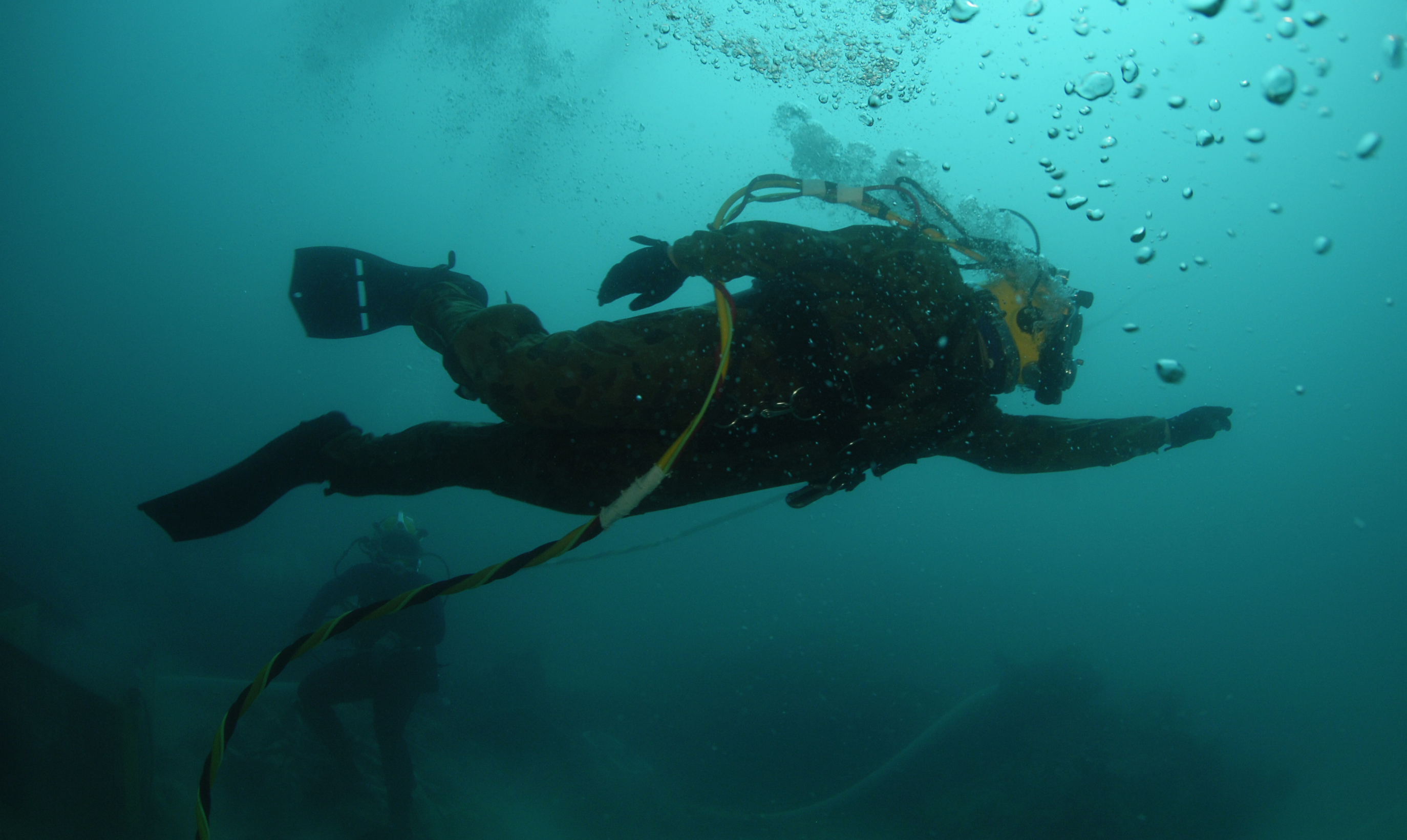
Diver Swimming

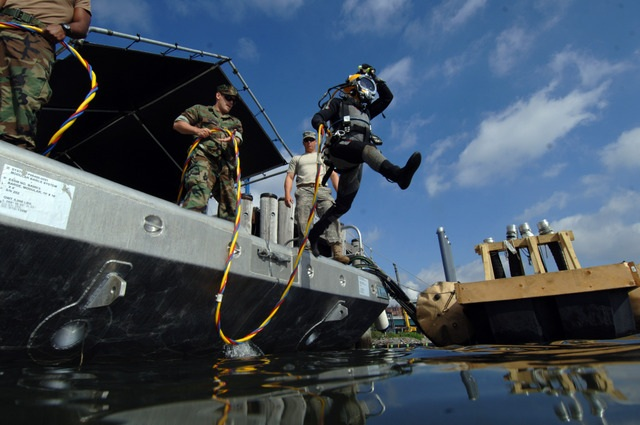
Rapidly deployed Surface Supplied Dive Missions

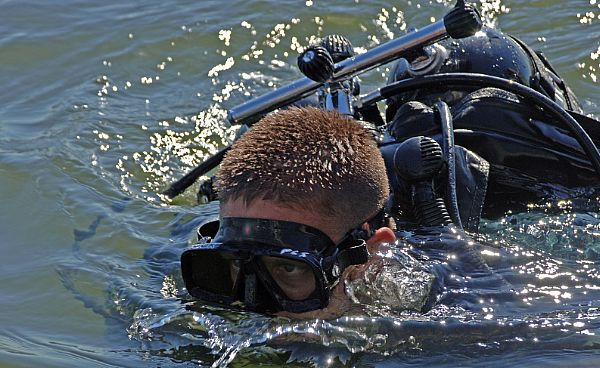
SCUBA

== Affiliations ==
In the United States Army, engineer divers are members of the Corps of Engineers. In the British Army, they may be Royal Engineer Divers or Commando Engineer Divers.

=== Royal Engineers and Commandos ===
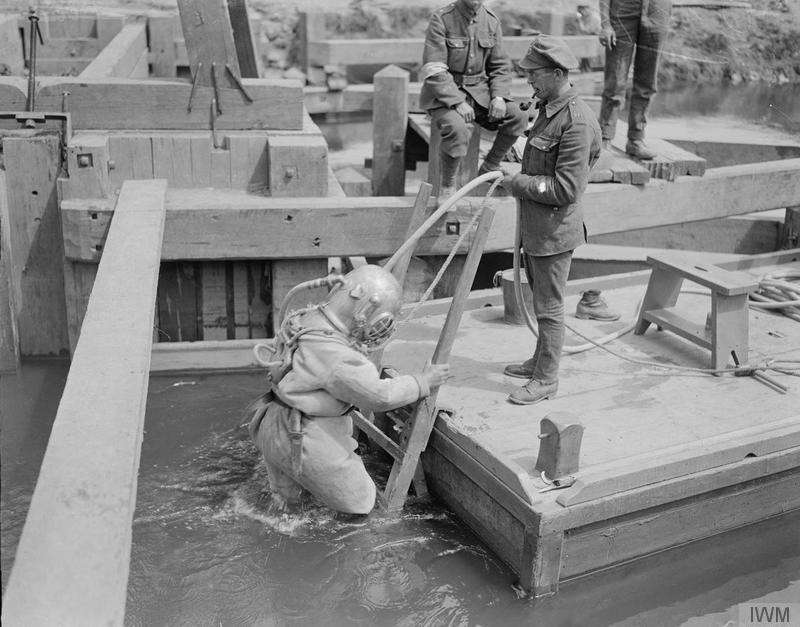
Diver of the Royal Engineers descending to repair the foundation of a bridge on the canal at Watten, 8 June 1918.

In the British Army, the Corps of Royal Engineers has a specialist role of Royal Engineer Diver dating back to 1838 under Colonel Charles William Pasley. They are trained at Horsea Island alongside Royal Navy divers for the tasks required of an engineer diver, such as underwater thermic lance cutting, concreting and demolition. In addition, the reserve Commando Engineer Divers of 131 Commando Squadron Royal Engineers, a part of the 24 Commando Engineer Regiment Dive Team, are trained as divers to the same standards.

=== US Army ===
Deep sea divers have been a part of the United States Army since the Spanish–American War. In 1898, they constructed a cofferdam around the USS Maine (ACR-1) to facilitate the ship's inspection and determine the cause of its sinking. Later, during World War I, Army divers built and inspected bridges, tunnels, and port facilities.

As part of the U.S. Army Port Construction and Repair Groups, U.S. Army divers operated throughout the European and Pacific theaters during World War II. Divers performed salvage, demolition, pier construction, and bridging support. As part of the Normandy landings, U.S. Army divers participated in operations at Utah Beach. They were also employed in rebuilding the port of Cherbourg following its capture. Later they were employed to reopen the Albert Canal from Liège to Antwerp, and assisted in the construction of the first Allied railroad bridge across the Rhine River, while in the Philippines, they undertook salvage operations in various ports and rivers.

During the Korean War, Army engineer divers worked with Port Construction Companies to build and maintain pipelines in the ports of Inchon and Pohang, and reconstruct the locks in the port of Inchon. Later, during the Vietnam War, Army divers constructed ship-to-shore petroleum distribution and port facilities in Cam Rahn Bay and Qui Nhon; they also constructed ammunition piers, and conducted body, helicopter and vehicle recoveries throughout the theater.

In 1989 during Operation Just Cause, U.S. Army divers from the 536th Engineer Battalion 7th Dive Detachment performed base security at Howard Air Force Base and conducted body recover of MIA pilots and aircraft OH-58 salvage operations in the Panama Canal.

In 1991 during Operation Desert Storm, divers deployed to Kuwait to engage in recovery operations after the ground war, clearing the Kuwaiti port of Shuaibah by removing debris and damaged Kuwaiti and Iraqi boats from the port.

Since then, U.S. Army divers have also supported port opening and reconstruction efforts in military operations in Somalia and Haiti. After 2002, U.S. Army divers have been continuously deployed foreword to the CENTCOM area of operations, including Iraq, Afghanistan, Qatar, Oman, United Arab Emirates, Bahrain, and Jordan. In these areas, U.S. Army divers have provided commanders on the battlefield with maneuver support, conducting operations such as search and recovery, river reconnaissance, construction and repair, demolition, salvage, port clearance and security, ships husbandry, and hydrographic surveys.

Army engineer divers continue to represent the vast capabilities of the U.S. Army Engineer Regiment by providing expeditionary engineer diving capabilities in support of combat, general, and geo-spatial engineer across the full spectrum of U.S. military operations worldwide. Throughout the history of their employment in the U.S. Army, divers have been organized under various commands and units, ranging from Engineer Port Construction to Transportation Support Commands. Currently, they are organized into five detachments (74th Engineer Dive Detachment, 86th Engineer Dive Detachment, 511th Engineer Dive Detachment, 569th Engineer Dive Detachment) at Joint Base Langley–Eustis, Virginia, and one detachment (7th Engineer Dive Detachment) at Joint Base Pearl Harbor–Hickam, Hawaii. Throughout the various conflicts in which Army divers have been employed, they have trained and fought alongside counterparts from the US Navy. Therefore, the co-location at the Naval Diving and Salvage Training Center is a fitting representation of their intertwined and storied history.

==== US Army training facilities ====
Army Divers are trained at the Naval Diving and Salvage Training Center (NDSTC) in Panama City, Florida.

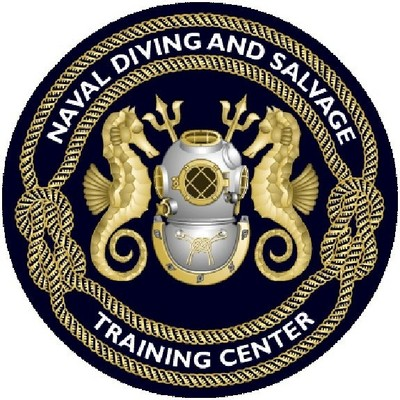
The school logo for the Naval Diving and Salvage Training Center (NDSTC) at "Naval Support Activity Panama City" in "Panama City, FL".

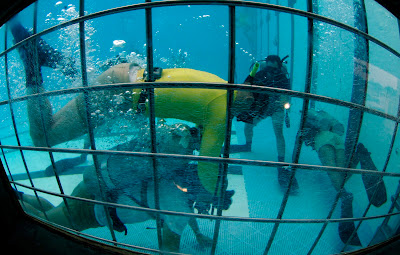
An instructor imposes an underwater problem on a student to assess their confidence level in the water when deprived of air.

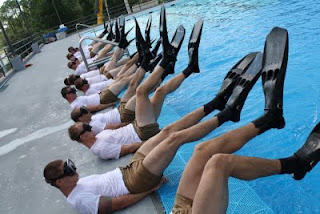
Students perform physical training on the pool deck.

==== US Army qualifications and badges ====
2nd Class Diver Badge

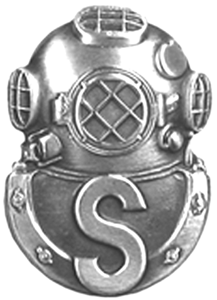
Army Salvage Diver Badge

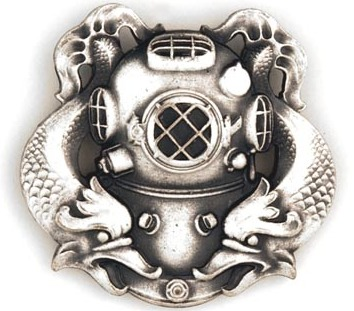
1st Class Diver Badge/Insignia

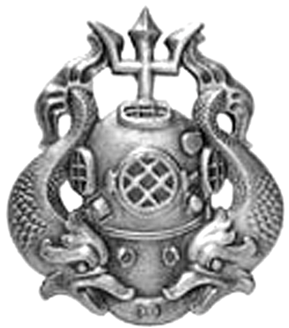
Army Master Diver Badge

Badges are awarded according to Humans Resource Command (HRC) and the Diver insignia regulations.

- 2nd Class Diver: E-1 to E-4 personnel. This is the basic diving qualification awarded upon completion of AIT School (pin awarded after the 6-month course) at NDSTC. Primary duties are to serve as in-water operators during various missions.
- Salvage Diver: E-5 to E-6 personnel. This is awarded upon the completion of the 2nd Class Diver checklist for Salvage Diver. Primary duties are to act as a more experienced 2nd Class Divers during difficult diving operations.
- 1st Class Diver: E-6 to E-7 personnel. This is awarded upon completion of 1st Class Diver school at NDSTC and completion of command qualification. Primary duties are to act as the diving supervisor on missions. They take care of all basic diver needs and mission requirements.
- Master Diver: E-7 and Above personnel. This is awarded upon the completion of the academic course and "Master Diver Evaluations" at NDSTC. Primary duties are to act as on-site subject matter experts for all diving related issues. This is the highest, and most respected, level of diving an enlisted soldier can attain.
- Marine Engineer Dive Officer: O-1 to O-3 personnel. This is awarded upon the completion of the Marine Engineer Dive Officer course at NDSTC. This is run simultaneously with the 2nd Class Diver course. Primary duties are to act as the final approving position for missions and to facilitate all administrative needs for the detachment and the mission. The Army does not issue officer or medical diver badges; however, Navy-awarded Diving Officer, Diving Medical Officer, and Diving Medical Technician Badges are authorized for wear on Army uniforms with written approval from the United States Army Human Resources Command.

Note: While Special Operations Diver Badges are considered dive badges, they are not associated with Army Engineer Divers.

==== US Army physical fitness test ====
The physical fitness test consists of the following carried out in the order given:

1. Swim 500 yards (457 m) within 12:30 minutes. (Candidates are allowed to push off the sides when turning. Only the breaststroke and side stroke are authorized.)
2. 10-minute rest period.
3. Perform 50 push-ups within 2 minutes (chest touches ground).
4. 2-minute rest period.
5. Perform 50 sit-ups within 2 minutes.
6. 2-minute rest period.
7. Perform 6 pull-ups. (Palms away from you. No kipping or swinging is allowed and the chin must clear the top of the bar on each repetition.)
8. 10-minute rest period.
9. Run 1.5 miles (2.414 km) within 12 minutes 30 seconds.

== See also ==
- Underwater Construction Teams
- Uniform Service Diver Insignia (United States) – Qualification badges of the uniformed services of the U.S.
- Military diving – Underwater diving in a military context by members of an armed force

== Bibliography ==
- Supervisor of Diving, Naval Sea Systems Command, 2007. US Navy Diving Manual. (UK): AquaPress Publishing. ISBN 1-905492-06-5. Revision 5. Hardback. The complete manual for equipment, procedures and operations established by the Department of Navy.
