= Underwater Construction Teams =

Navy construction battalion underwater construction units

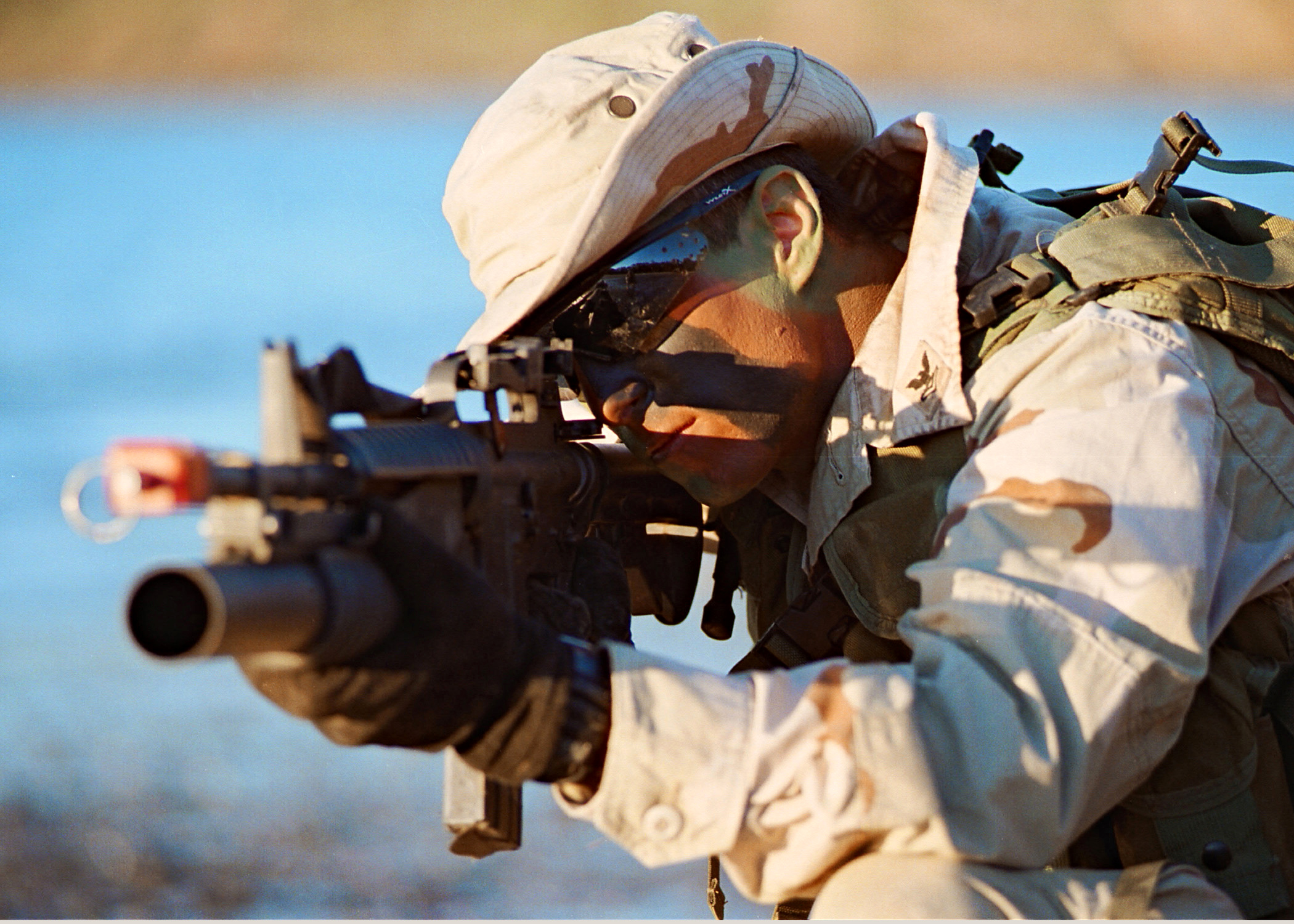
Underwater Construction Team Two (UCT-2) conduct training

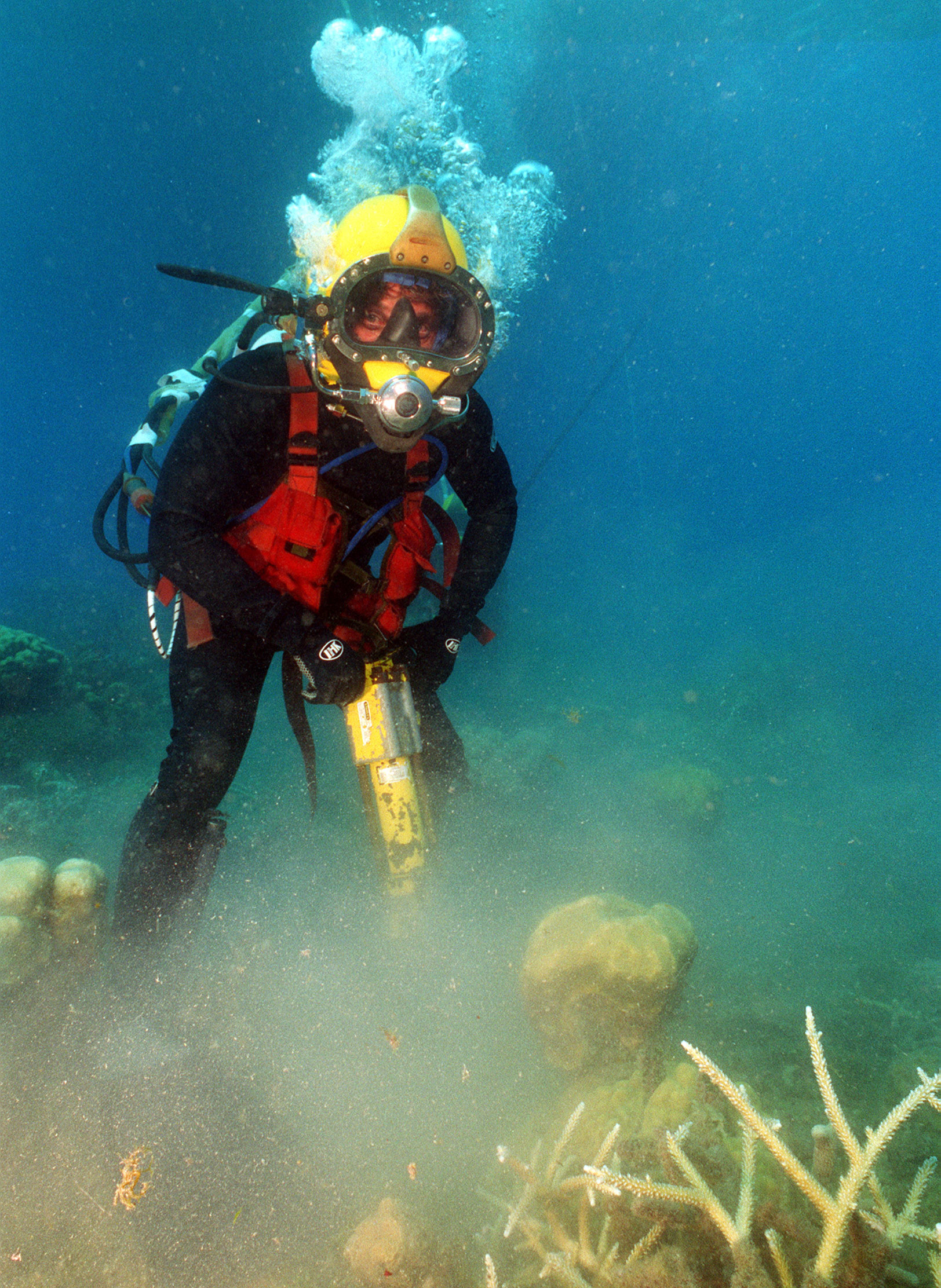
Underwater Construction

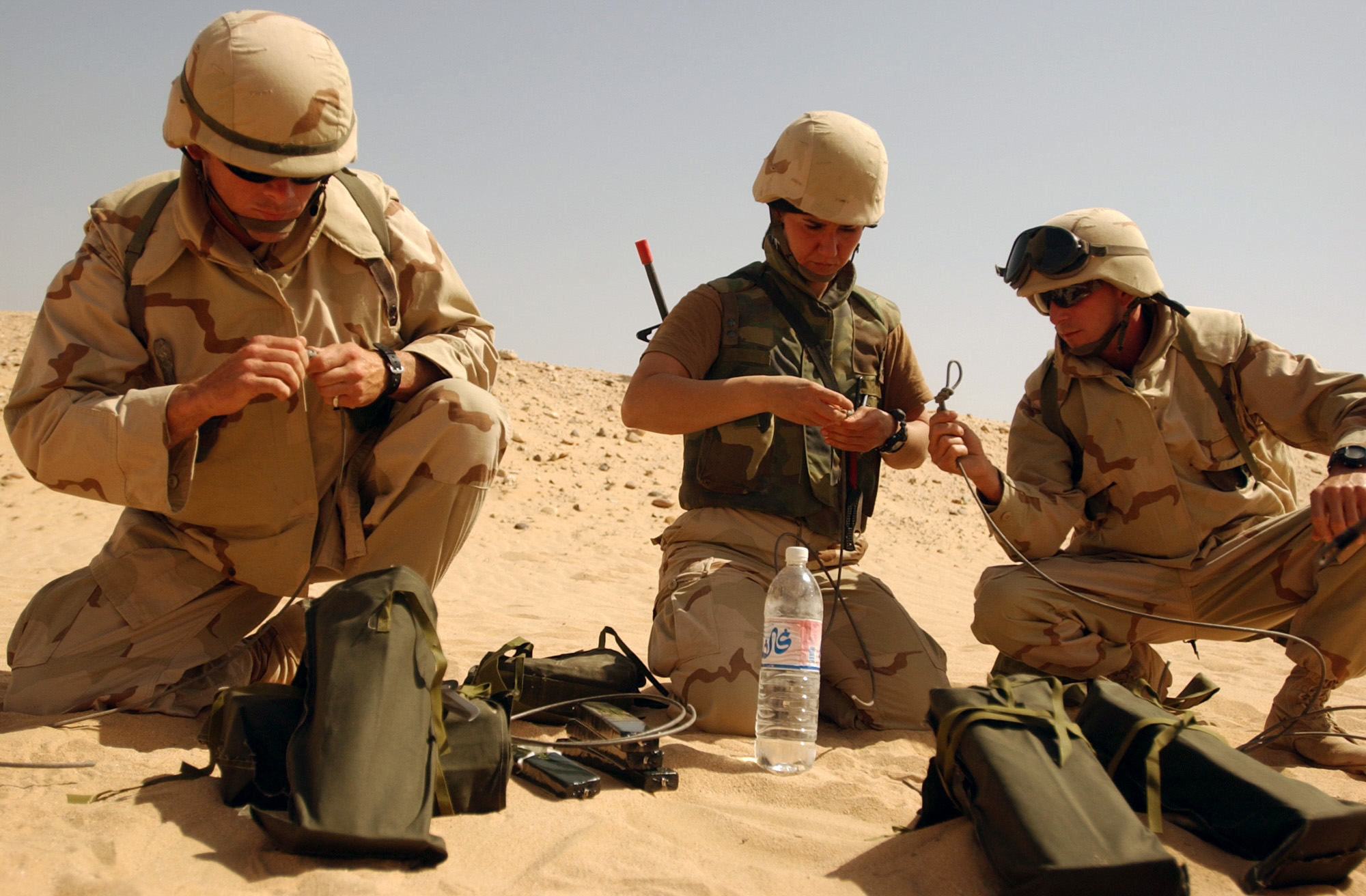
US Navy members of Underwater Construction Team 2 prepare explosives

Underwater Construction Teams (UCT) are the United States Navy Seabees' underwater construction units numbered 1 and 2 that were created in 1974. A team is composed of divers qualified in both underwater construction and underwater demolition. Possible tasks can be: battle damage repairs, structural inspections and assessments, demolition of waterline facilities or submerged obstructions, installation of submerged surveillance systems, or harbor and channel clearance. As needed, teams may test and or evaluate new or existing aquatic systems or equipment. Extending construction, whether vertical or horizontal, beyond the shoreline and waterline is their specialty. Reflecting Seabee tradition, teams are expected to execute underwater construction anywhere, anytime, under any conditions.

== History ==
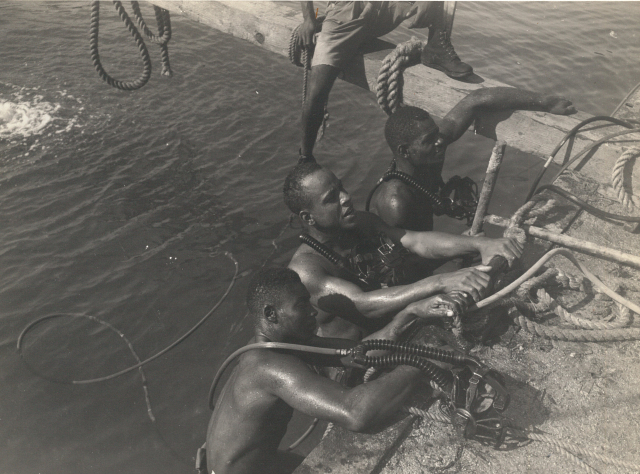
Seabees at Gavutu, Solomon Islands November 8, 1943 installing a marine railway utilizing field fabricated diving gear.

Almost as soon as Naval Construction Battalions were created submerged construction tasks were being brought to the Seabees. In 1942 a second class divers school was created at Camp Peary and Seabees have fielded divers ever since. Naval Combat Demolition Units selected Seabee divers to support specialized U.S. Marines and Army units. WWII battalions typically had a complement of 4 qualified divers. In the field, CBs would tap other battalions for additional divers to get the job done as needed. It was common for battalions to not have organic diving gear. Divers were taught in diving school how to fabricate a breathing apparatus from Navy MK-III gas masks for surface support. Most of the work was in less than 60' of water, but the WWII cruisebooks indicate men pushed the limits of what they could do with what they had. Divers in the 301st CB placed as much as 50 tons of explosives a day to keep their dredges productive. However, the divers of CB 96 used 1,727,250 lbs of dynamite to blast 423,300 cubic yards of coral for the ship repair facility on Manicani Island, as an element of the Naval Operating Base Leyte-Samar. Their primary diving gear was modified Navy Mk III and Navy Mk IV gas masks.

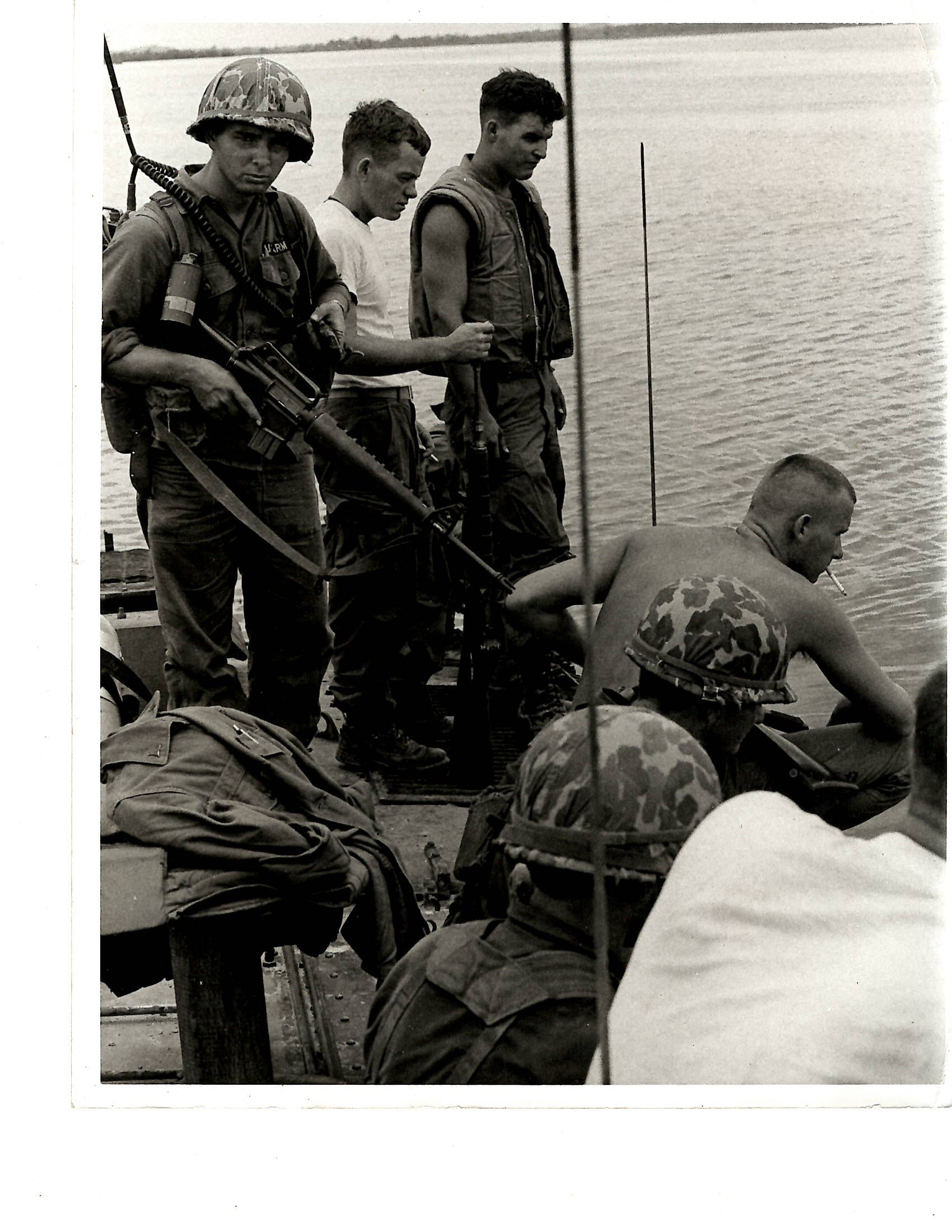
MCB 71 Underwater Construction Team surface support on the Tra Bong River

During the Vietnam War at Chu Lai in 1967 MCB 71 had an Under Water Construction Team search the Tra Bong River for a missing Squad of Marines. Their efforts made publication in Stars and Stripes. In 1974, several Underwater Demolition Team divers, primarily from UDT-13, helped establish the first independent UCT teams 1 and 2.

== Diving Commands ==
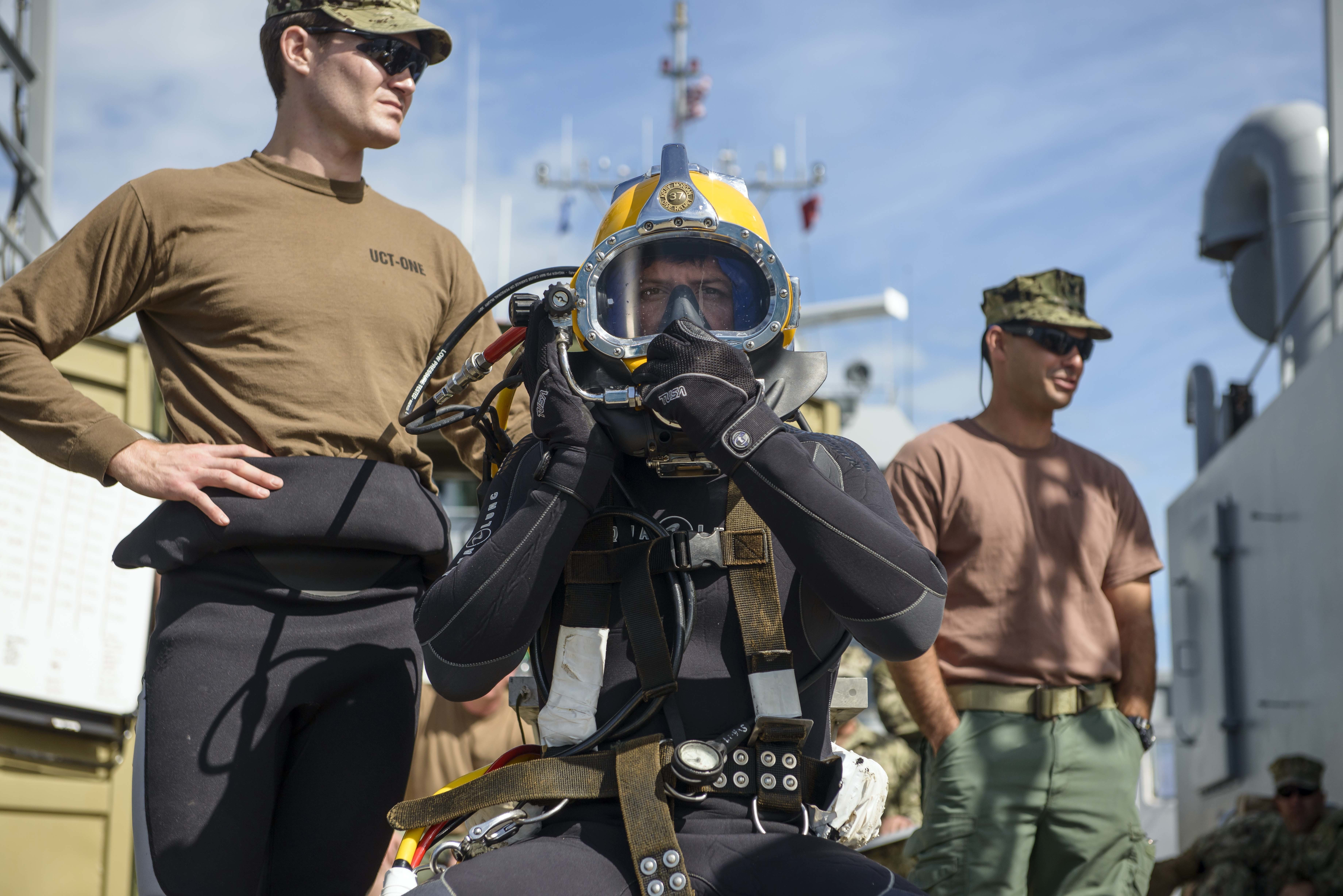
Joint UCT-1 and UCT-2 training exercise off the USAV Matomoros

UCT divers are attached to five principal commands outside the NCF:

- UCT 1, Gulfport, MS.
- UCT 2, Port Hueneme, CA.
- Naval Facilities Engineering Service Center (NFESC) dets at Port Hueneme, CA, and at the Washington Navy Yard, DC. CEC officer billets only. Those at Port Hueneme are with the highly technical NFESC "Dive Locker Team".
- NAVFAC EXWC det San Diego, CA
- Navy System Commands, e.g., NAVSEA or NAVAIR. These are CEC officer billets only.
- NEDU/NDSTC (Navy Experimental Diving Unit – Navy Diving & Salvage Training Center)

The UCTs have a Shore Duty component and a Sea Duty component. Sea Duty personnel are divided into three Air Detachments that deploy worldwide in support of both peacetime or combat missions as needed. The Shore Duty component contains all of the staff and support functions such as Administration, Supply, Logistics, Table of Allowance Maintenance, and Training.

== Underwater Construction Technicians ==
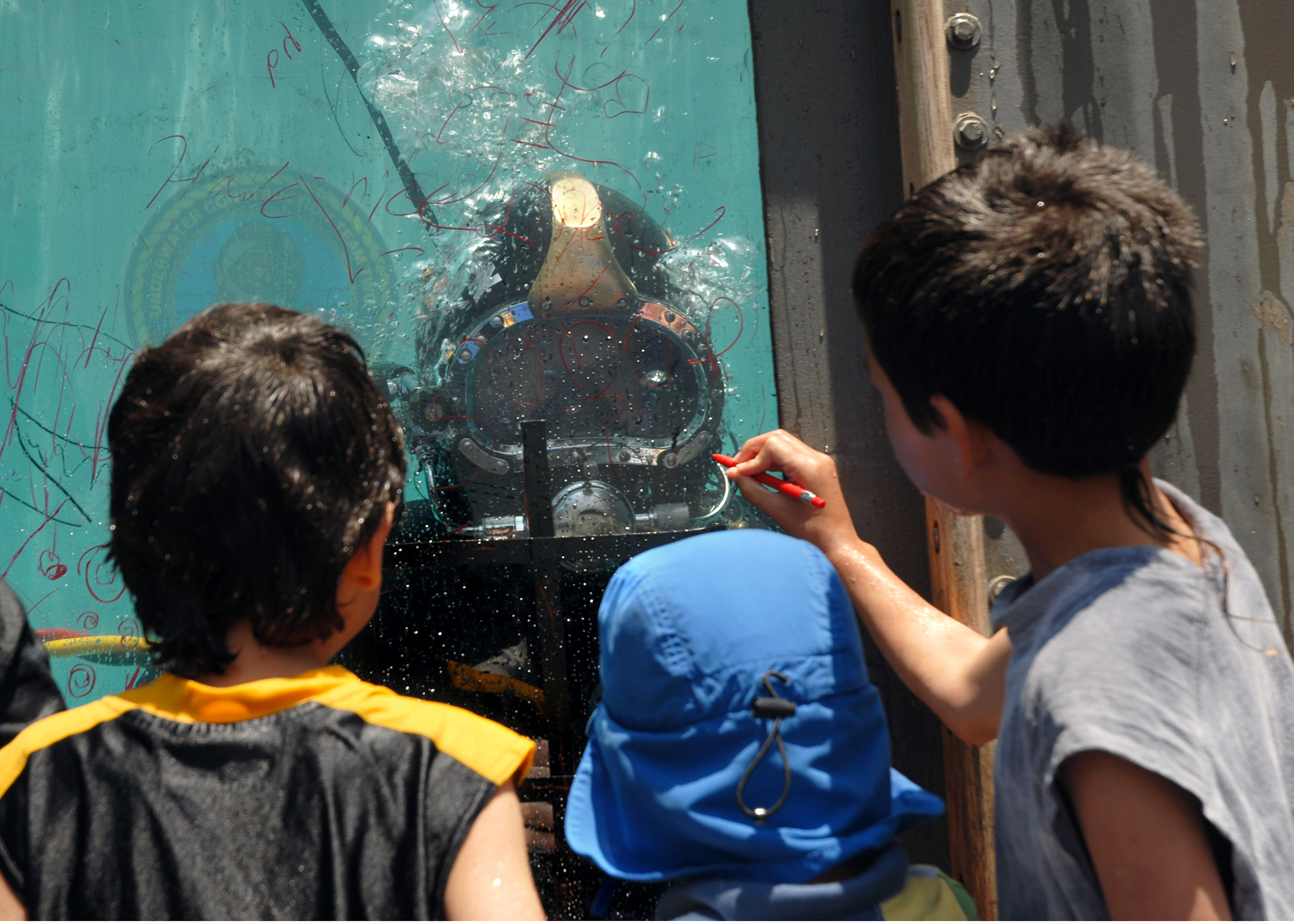
A U.S. Navy Seabee diver from Underwater Construction Team 2 plays tic-tac-toe with children from the inside of a water tank during Seabee Days

UCT training is 26 weeks at Dive school in Panama City, Florida. There is a tactical training phase for advanced expeditionary combat skills and demolitions.

After Basic Underwater Construction Technician training a diver is qualified as a (2nd Class Diver). UCTs are members of the Naval Special Operations (NSO) community.

With their skills sets UCTs can deploy to support a Naval Special Warfare Command, either with SEAL teams, Special Boat Teams, Navy EOD Teams, or other dive elements. They also can apply for selection to support Naval Special Warfare Development Group.

== Diver Qualification Insignia ==
Seabee Underwater Construction Technicians Insignia

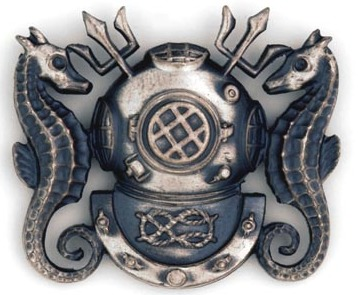
Master Diver

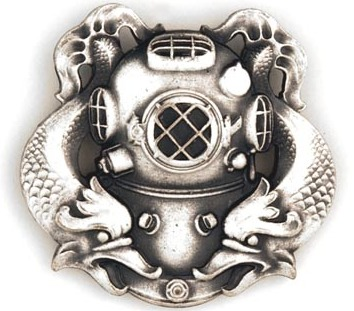
1st Class Diver

2nd Class Diver

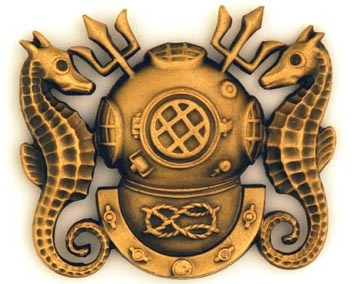
Diving Officer

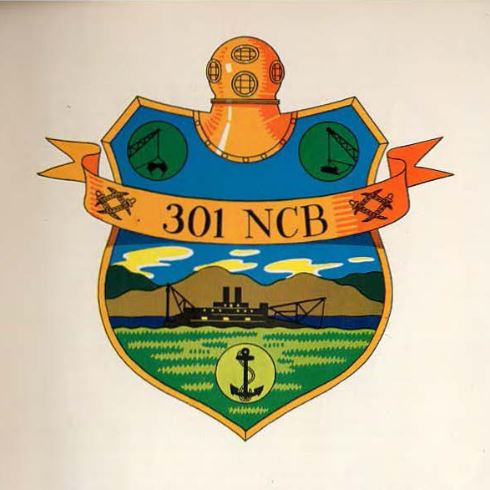
The 301st CB was unique in WWII for recognizing Seabee divers with the unit insignia. The battalion diving officer was Carp Chief Achenson CEC, the first UDT swimmer.

Diver : is a qualification that the various rates can obtain with three grades: Basic Underwater Construction Technician/ NEC 5932 (2nd Class Diver), Advanced Underwater Construction Technician/ NEC 5931 (1st Class Diver), and Master Underwater Construction Technician/ NEC 5933 (Master diver).

== See also ==
- Amphibious Construction Battalion 1
- Amphibious Construction Battalion 2
- Army engineer diver
- Civil Engineer Corps
- Clearance diver
- United States special operations forces
- List of former United States special operations units
- List of military diving units
- Naval Mobile Construction Battalion 1
- Naval Mobile Construction Battalion 3
- Naval Mobile Construction Battalion 4
- Naval Mobile Construction Battalion 5
- Naval Mobile Construction Battalion 11
- Naval Mobile Construction Battalion 133
- Seabee
- Seabees in World War II
- Underwater demolition
- United States Naval Special Warfare Command
