= United States Marine Corps Combatant Diver Course =

Military diver training for the US Marines

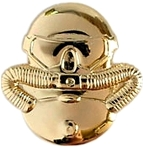
USMC Combatant Diving Badge, 2002–present

The USMC Combatant Diver Course is taught at the Navy Diving and Salvage Training Center, Naval Support Activity Panama City, Panama City, Florida. Both of the Marine Air-Ground Task Force reconnaissance assets, FMF Recon and MarDiv Recon, widely use combatant diving. During this eight-week course, trainees are introduced to open and closed-circuit diving (using the Dräger LAR-V rebreather), diving physics and medical aid. Most of the training in combatant diving is done at night.

The course provides underwater tactical training and the skills needed to successfully conduct underwater navigation for infiltration and exfiltration. The candidates negotiate long distances in open water, infiltrating by surface and sub-surface, learning to deal with the hazards of a surf zone tangle and simulated equipment malfunctions.

The combatant divers course combines lecture, demonstration, and practical application in oxygen charging procedures using the USMC Oxygen Transfer Pump System, or USMC OTPS. Upon the completion of this course, the Marines (of any MOS that attends) are given the Special "B" MOS 0324 Reconnaissance Man, Combatant Diver Qualified (NMOS) [formerly 8653].

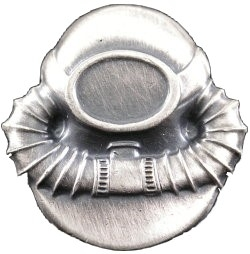
USN SCUBA Diver Badge, 1980–2006

== History ==
The Combat Swimmers Course was previously taught at the United States Navy's Amphibious Reconnaissance School, Troop Training Units (TTU)s at either Expeditionary Warfare Training Group (EWTG); Pacific (EWTGPAC) or Atlantic (EWTGLANT). It was first formed during World War II to teach selected reconnaissance Marines and sailors the fundamentals of advanced swimming. They were located on both of the United States' coasts, at the naval amphibious bases NAB Little Creek and NAB Coronado.

By the late 1980s, some combatant swimming courses were taught using the Marine Corps's own infrastructure, by experienced Marine combat divers. Because of the lack of facilities on Marine Corps bases, the Navy continued to provide the necessary training grounds for such training activities. The USMC Combatant Divers Course was established in 1993 at the Navy Diving and Salvage Training Center (NDSTC) in Panama City, FL.
