= Naval Support Activity Panama City =

Naval Support Activity Florida

- Part of Navy Region Southeast
- Bay County, near Panama City, Florida
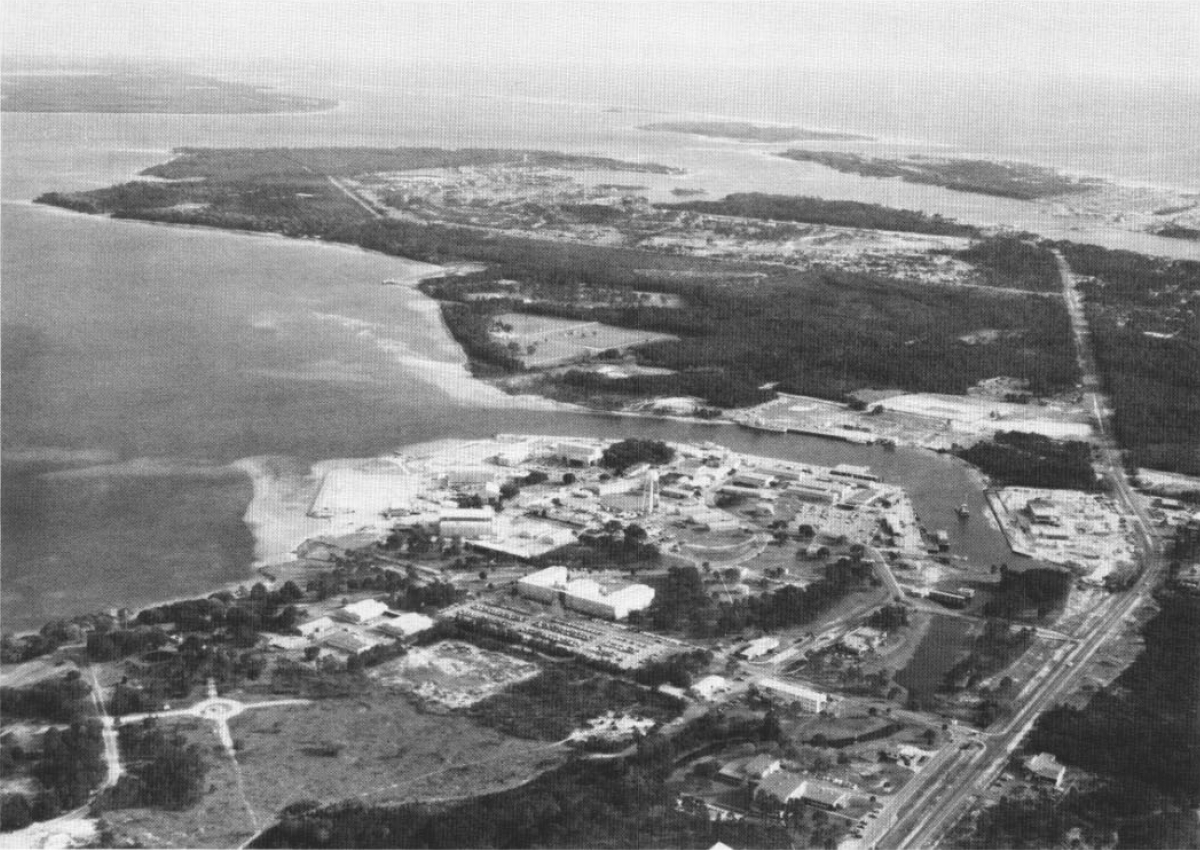
- Naval Support Activity Panama City in 1980

Site information
- Controlled by: United States Navy

Location
- Coordinates: 30°10′24″N 85°45′00″W

Site history
- In use: 20 July 1945 - present

Garrison information
- Past commanders: CDR Jessica M. Pfefferkorn, USN
- Occupants: Naval Surface Warfare Center Panama City Division, Navy Experimental Diving Unit, Navy Diving and Salvage Training Center, United States Coast Guard

Naval Support Activity Panama City (NSA PC), is a military shore installation of the United States Navy located in Panama City, Florida. Among its various tenant commands, it houses the Naval Surface Warfare Center Panama City Division (NSWC PCD), the Center for Explosive Ordnance Disposal & Diving (CENEODDIVE), the Navy Experimental Diving Unit (NEDU), and Coast Guard Station Panama City.

== History ==
The NSA PC was founded as the U.S. Navy Mine Countermeasures Station on 20 July 1945, as a result of the transfer of the test station from Solomons, Maryland, but was renamed ca. 1955 to the U.S. Navy Mine Defense Laboratory. In 1972, it was renamed the Naval Coastal Systems Laboratory which changed to Naval Coastal Systems Center in 1981. The base has been a subsidiary of several other commands in the past including Naval Surface Warfare Center Carderock Division, and Naval Surface Warfare Center Dahlgren Division, under which it was designated Naval Surface Warfare Center: Coastal Systems Station. It obtained its current name in 2007 after changing from the prior command structure to the tenant command structure used by the Navy today in its command of research and development centers.

In addition to waterfront port facilities, the installation also contains a hangar and a paved heliport facility approximately 300 feet by 400 feet in size to accommodate naval helicopters up to and including the MH-53E Sea Dragon. The Navy airfield identifier is NBV.

== Tenant commands ==
NSAPC consists of several tenant command organizations:

- Naval Surface Warfare Center: Panama City Division (NSWC PCD): This is the largest tenant command and the Research and Development arm of the base. It is part of the NAVSEA System of Naval Surface Warfare Centers.
- Center for Explosive Ordnance Disposal & Diving (CENEODDIVE)
- Navy Experimental Diving Unit (NEDU): The Experimental Diving Unit is the evaluation facility for Navy Diving.
- Navy Diving Salvage and Training Center: The Navy Diving Salvage Training Center is the training facility for Navy Diving, Reconnaissance Marines, Army engineer divers, Air Force pararescue and special tactics, and Coast Guard diving. These divers are trained for such missions as wreckage recovery, mine defusing, and reconnaissance.
- Deployable Joint Command and Control System
- Explosive Ordnance Disposal Detachment
- Coastal Operations Institute
- Coast Guard Station Panama City

== Research ==
NSWC PCD conducts research on littoral warfare and its disciplines include optics, acoustics, mine warfare and robotics. NSWC PCD employs approximately 1,100 scientists and engineers within NSWC PCD. The newest facility on the base is the Littoral Warfare Research Facility, a $10 million research and development facility dedicated to littoral warfare research; it was completed in 2006.

Engineering projects of historical note include the Swimmer Delivery Vehicle, Joint Architecture for Unmanned Systems (JAUS) and Landing Craft Air Cushioned (LCAC). Current projects include the majority of U.S. research into hovercraft technology and weapons integration for the Littoral Combat Ship (LCS).

== Geography ==
NSWC PCD Heliport
- IATA: none; ICAO: KNBV; FAA LID: NBV

Summary
- Airport type: Military
- Owner: United States Navy
- Location: Panama City, Florida, USA
- Elevation AMSL: 10 ft (3.0 m)
- Interactive map of NSWC PCD Heliport

Helipads
Number	Length		Surface
Number	ft	m	Surface
H1	390	119	Concrete

Statistics
- Based Aircraft: 2 to 4

NSA PC totals 657 acres (2.66 km^{2}) and houses 221 buildings. Additionally, NSA PC operates several miles of inter coastal waterways for a direct connection to the Gulf of Mexico.

== Economic impact ==
NSWC PCD is a major research, development, test, and evaluation laboratories of the Naval Sea Systems Command (NAVSEA). It is one of the largest employers in Bay County, Florida with an annual payroll of about $117 million. NSA PC employs approximately 2800 civilian and military personnel, for an annual payroll of over $150 million. NSA PC contracts services buys local goods, and maintains an active construction program. Its economic impact on Bay County is about $400 million annually.

== See also ==
- Naval Surface Warfare Center Dahlgren Division
- Naval Surface Warfare Center
