= 22nd Special Tactics Squadron =

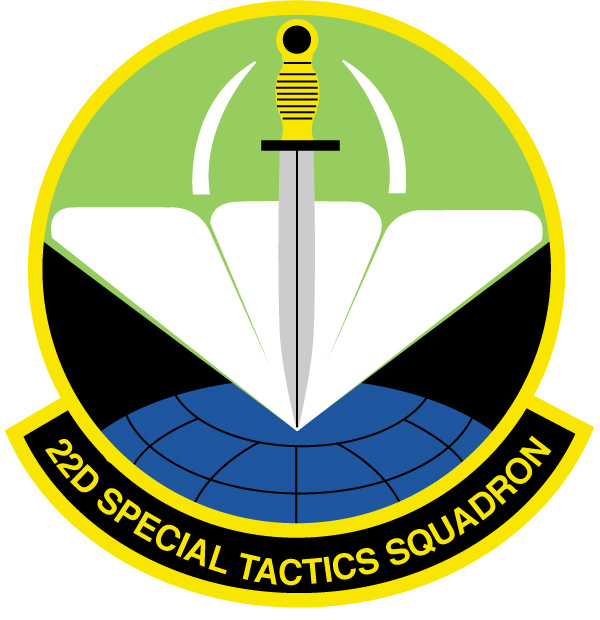
- 22nd Special Tactics Squadron emblem.
- Founded: 1984-present
- Country: United States
- Branch: United States Air Force
- Type: Special Operations Force
- Role: Special Operations, CCTs, and PJs
- Part of: 24th Special Operations Wing; 720th Special Tactics Group
- Garrison/HQ: Joint Base Lewis–McChord (McChord Air Force Base)
- Engagements: Operation Just Cause; Gulf War; War in Afghanistan; Iraq War
- Decorations: Gallant Unit Citation; Air Force Meritorious Unit Award; Air Force Outstanding Unit Award with Combat "V" Device; Air Force Outstanding Unit Award

Insignia
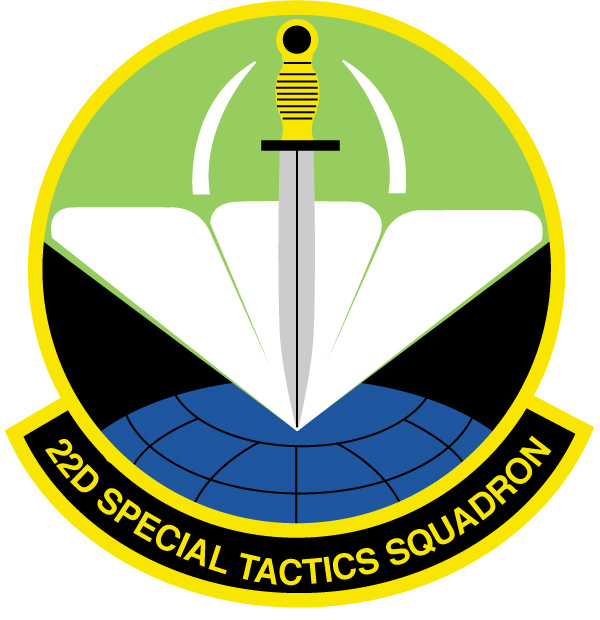
- 22nd Special Tactics Squadron emblem (approved 16 July 1999)

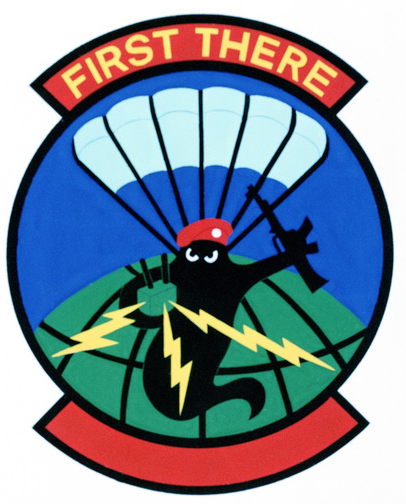
- 1722nd Combat Control Squadron emblem (approved c. December 1986)

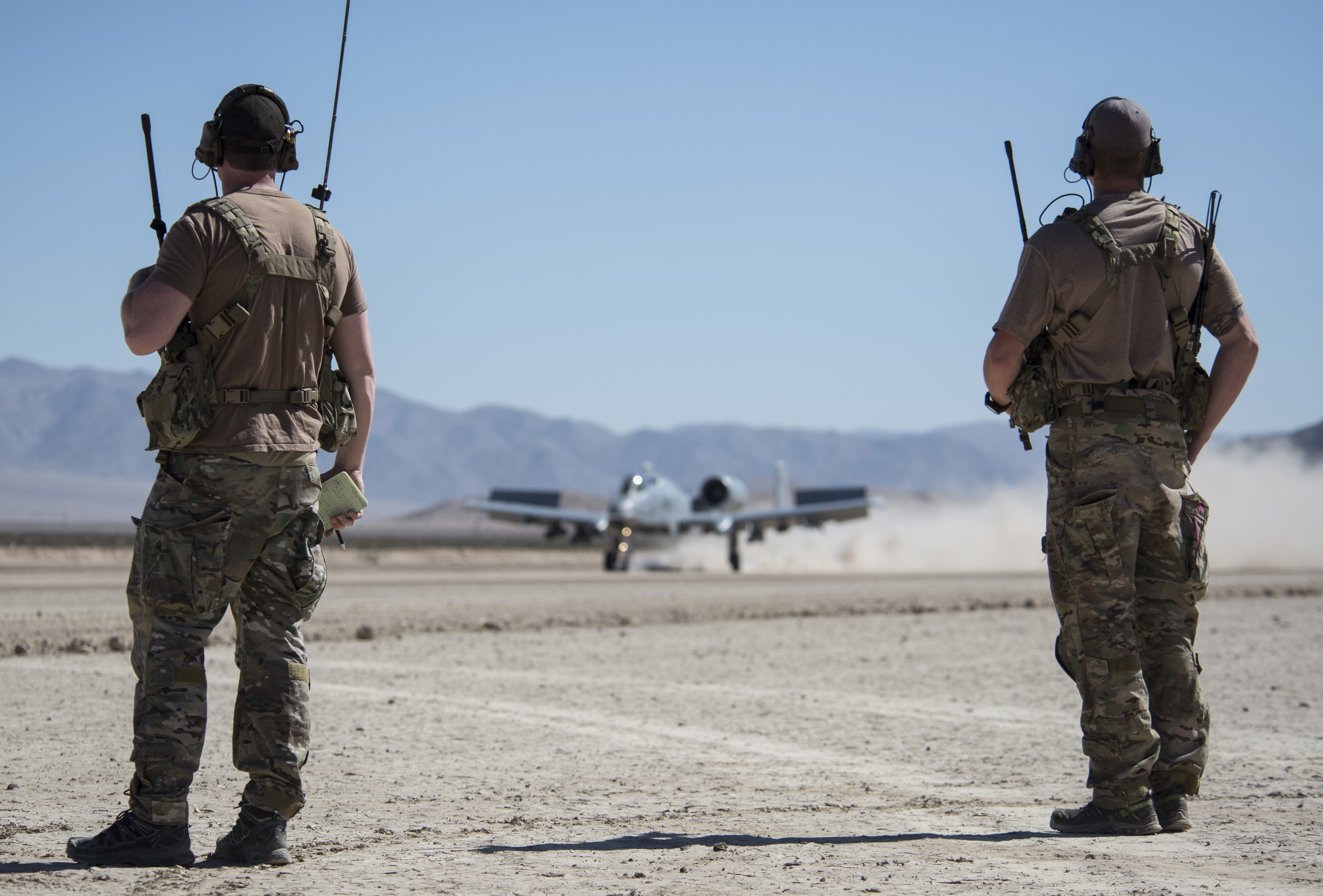
Airmen assigned to the 22nd Special Tactics Squadron, Joint Base Lewis–McChord, watch as an A-10 Thunderbolt II lands in support of Green Flag West 15-08.5 on the National Training Center at Fort Irwin National Training Center July 16, 2015. As Combat Controllers, part of their job is to operate in remote and sometimes hostile areas helping the Air Force accomplish its mission by directing air traffic and alerting pilots and command of the location of hostile forces on the ground.

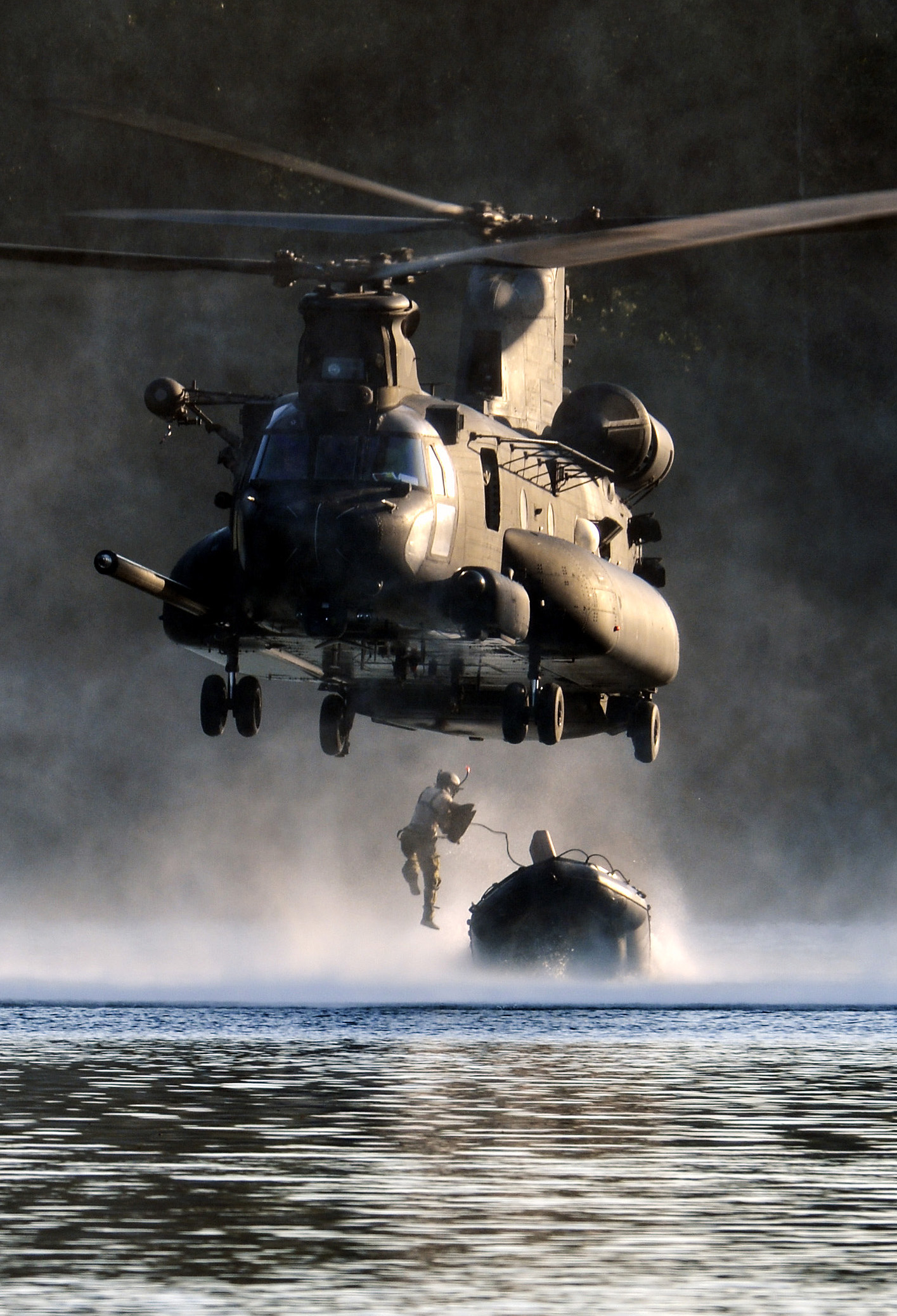
A MH-47G Chinook crew from the 160th Special Operations Aviation Regiment (Airborne) and airmen from the 22nd Special Tactics Squadron (Red Team) conduct helocast alternate insertion and extraction training at American Lake on Joint Base Lewis-McChord

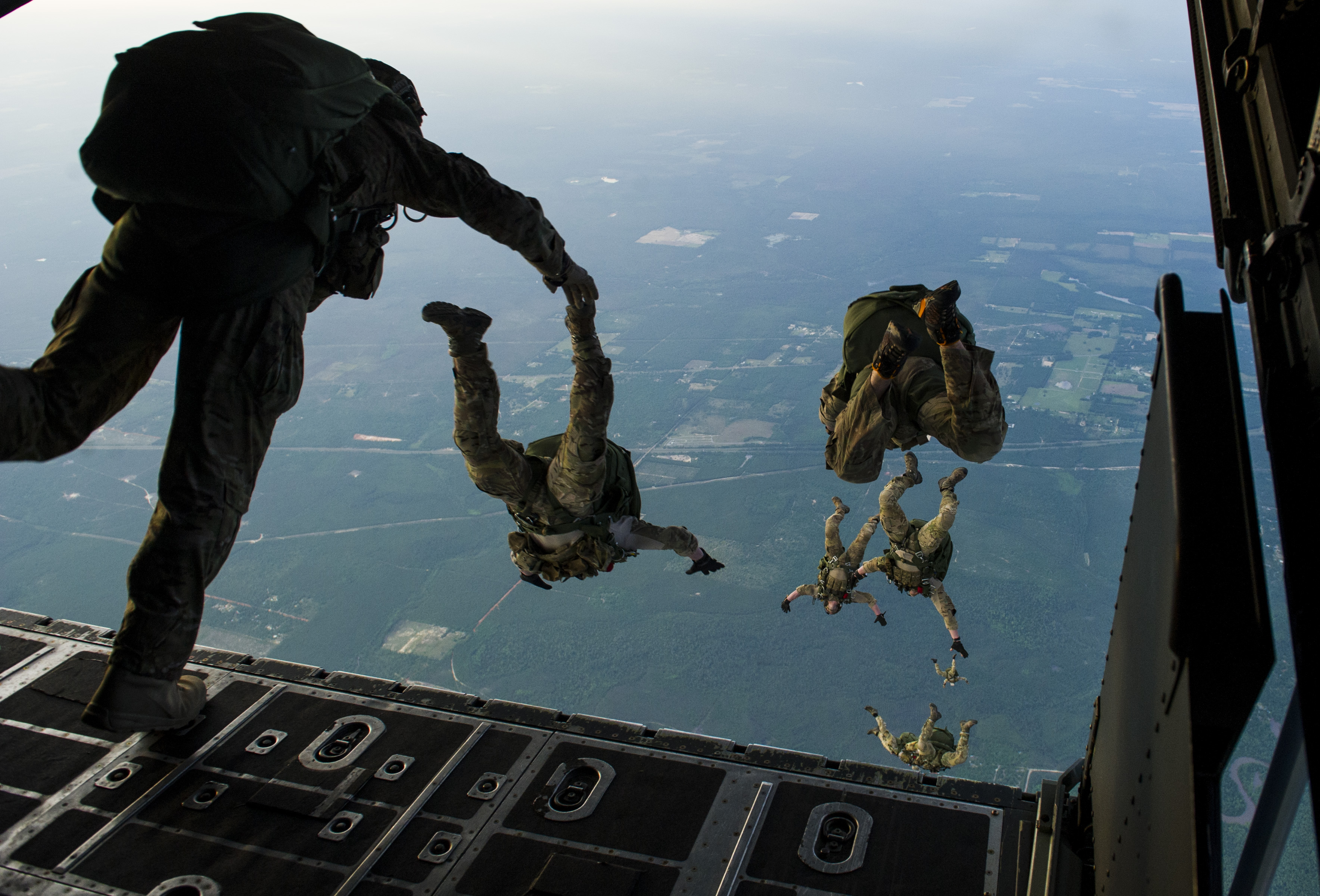
Members of the 22nd Special Tactics Squadron jump from an MC-130H Combat Talon II May 2, 2014, during Emerald Warrior over Hurlburt Field, Fla. Emerald Warrior is an annual joint exercise to train special operations, conventional and partner nation forces in combat scenarios designed to hone special operations air and ground combat skills, and is the Department of Defense's only irregular warfare exercise.

The 22nd Special Tactics Squadron is a Special Tactics unit of the United States Air Force Special Operations Command, based at the McChord Air Force Base facility of Joint Base Lewis–McChord.

Constituted and activated in 1984 as the 1722nd Combat Control Squadron at McChord Air Force Base (now part of Joint Base Lewis–McChord), it participated in Operation Just Cause and the Gulf War. The squadron was redesignated the 62nd Combat Control Squadron in 1992 and the 22nd Special Tactics Squadron in 1996, when it became part of the 720th Special Tactics Group in 1996. The 22nd STS has fought in the War in Afghanistan and the Iraq War.

== History ==
The 1722d Combat Control Squadron was constituted and activated on 1 July 1984 at McChord Air Force Base, assigned to the Twenty-Second Air Force. It fought in Operation Just Cause, the United States invasion of Panama, in December 1989 and January 1990. From 17 January to 11 April 1991, the 1722d fought in Operation Desert Storm, the liberation of Kuwait during the Gulf War. On 1 March it became part of the 1725th Combat Control Group. The squadron became part of the 62d Operations Group on 1 June 1992 and was redesignated the 62d Combat Control Squadron.

On 1 May 1996, the squadron was redesignated the 22d Special Tactics Squadron and became part of the 720th Special Tactics Group. The squadron fought in the War in Afghanistan and the Iraq War. For actions in deployments to Afghanistan in 2006 and 2007, Combat Controllers Technical Sergeant Scott Innis and Staff Sergeants Sean Harvell and Evan Jones were awarded the Silver Star. On 23 January 2013, Combat Controller Staff Sergeant Adam Krueger was awarded the Silver Star for calling in airstrikes on insurgents in Afghanistan while under fire.

In June 2014, Lieutenant Colonel Michael Evancic took command of the squadron, replacing Colonel Thad Allen. Between 14 and 15 July it participated in exercises with the 160th Special Operations Aviation Regiment. Combat Controller Technical Sergeant Matthew McKenna was awarded the Silver Star on 18 August for coordinating airstrikes on insurgents in Afghanistan while under fire. On 17 December pararescueman Master Sergeant Ivan Ruiz was awarded the Air Force Cross for saving the lives of two wounded Army Special Forces teammates on 10 December 2013 while deployed to Kandahar Province in Afghanistan with the 22nd STS. In 2015 the squadron was involved in airfield assessment missions in Africa. On 16 November 2016, Combat Controller Staff Sergeant Keaton Thiem was awarded the Silver Star for coordinating airstrikes under enemy fire on 22 February of that year in Parwan Province. As of August 2017 it was commanded by Lieutenant Colonel Daniel Magruder.

== Lineage ==
- Constituted as 1722d Combat Control Squadron and activated on 1 July 1984

Redesignated 62d Combat Control Squadron on 1 June 1992
Redesignated 22d Special Tactics Squadron on 1 May 1996

=== Assignments ===
- Twenty-Second Air Force, 1 July 1984
- 1725th Combat Control Group, 1 March 1991
- 62d Operations Group, 1 June 1992
- 720th Special Tactics Group, 1 May 1996–present

=== Stations ===
- McChord Air Force Base, now part of (Joint Base Lewis–McChord), 1 July 1984–present

=== Awards and campaigns ===
Award streamer	Award	Dates	Notes
	Gallant Unit Citation	1 January 2006 – 31 December 2007	22d Special Tactics Squadron
	Air Force Meritorious Unit Award	1 January 2008 – 30 September 2009	22d Special Tactics Squadron
	Air Force Meritorious Unit Award	1 October 2009–30 September 2011	22d Special Tactics Squadron
	Air Force Outstanding Unit Award w/Combat "V" Device	1 September 2001 – 31 August 2003	22nd Special Tactics Squadron
	Air Force Outstanding Unit Award	1 July 1986 – 30 June 1988	1722d Combat Control Squadron
	Air Force Outstanding Unit Award	14 June – 3 July 1991	1722d Combat Control Squadron
	Air Force Outstanding Unit Award	1 August 1995 – 31 July 1997	22d Special Tactics Squadron
	Air Force Outstanding Unit Award	1 August 1997 – 31 July 1999	22d Special Tactics Squadron
	Air Force Outstanding Unit Award	1 September 1999 – 31 August 2001	22d Special Tactics Squadron
	Air Force Outstanding Unit Award	1 October 2012 – 30 September 2014	22d Special Tactics Squadron

Armed Forces Expeditionary Streamer	Campaign	Dates	Notes
	Panama	20 December 1989 – 31 January 1990	1722d Combat Control Squadron

Campaign Streamer	Campaign	Dates	Notes
	Liberation and Defense of Kuwait	17 January 1991 – 11 April 1991	1722d Combat Control Squadron
	Consolidation II	1 October 2006 – 30 November 2009	22d Special Tactics Squadron
	Consolidation III	1 December 2009 – 30 June 2011	22d Special Tactics Squadron
	Iraqi Sovereignty	1 January 2009 – 31 August 2010	22d Special Tactics Squadron
	Iraqi New Dawn	1 September 2010 – 15 December 2011	22d Special Tactics Squadron
