= 720th Special Tactics Group =

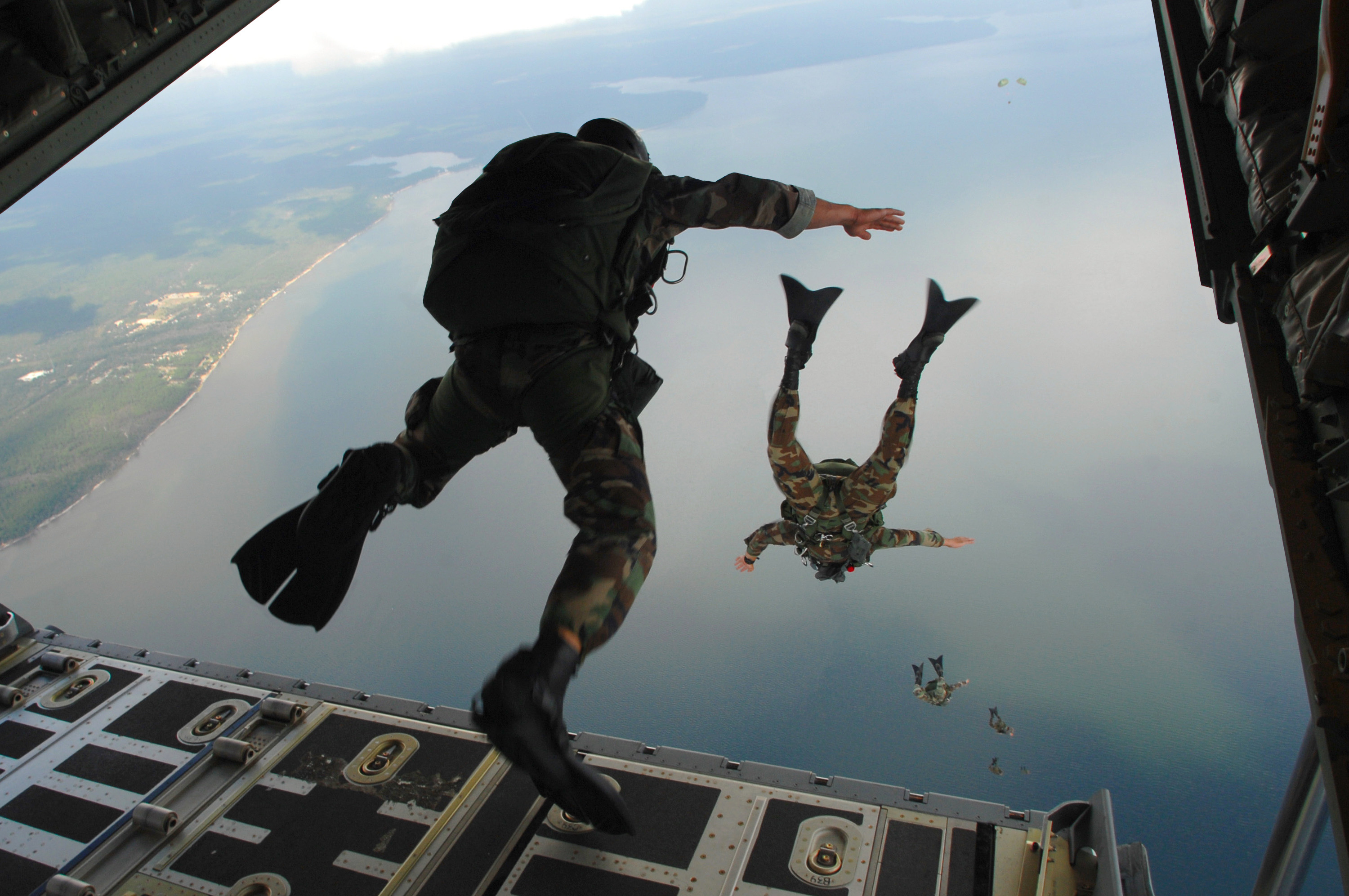
- 720th Special Tactics Group airmen jump from a C-130J Hercules
- Active: 1987 – present
- Country: United States
- Branch: United States Air Force
- Type: Special Operations Forces
- Role: Organize, train and equip special tactics forces
- Size: 800
- Part of: U.S. Special Operations Command; Air Force Special Operations Command; 24th Special Operations Wing
- Garrison/HQ: Hurlburt Field
- Engagements: Persian Gulf War; War in Afghanistan; Iraq War
- Decorations: Gallant Unit Citation; Meritorious Unit Award; Air Force Outstanding Unit Award with "V" Device

Insignia
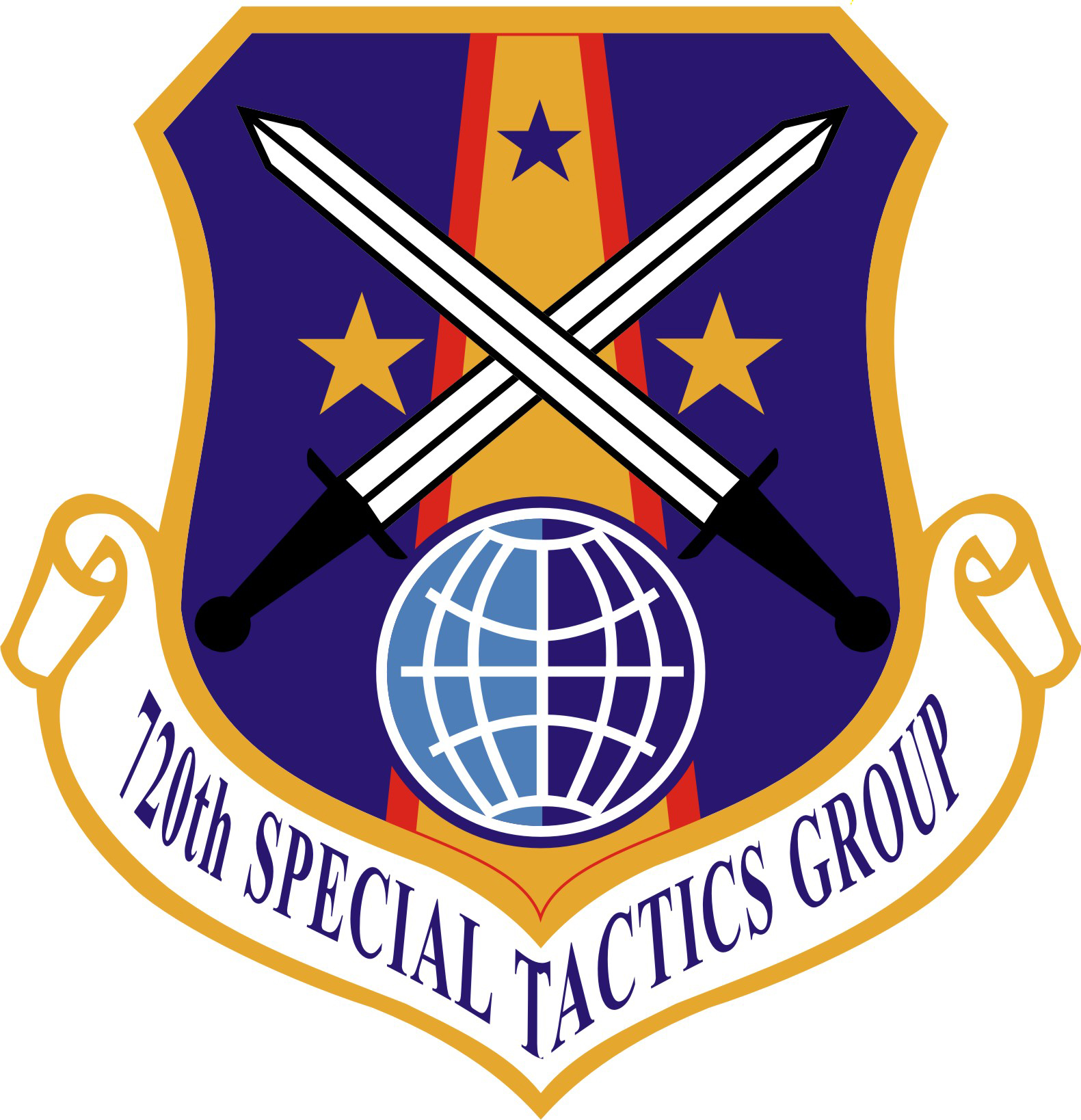
- 720th Special Tactics Group emblem (Note: Approved 9 June 1988. Significance: Blue and yellow are the Air Force colors. Blue alludes to the sky, the primary theater of Air Force operations. Yellow refers to the sun and the excellence required of Air Force personnel. The swords symbolize the elite forces merged to form the group. They are crossed above the globe, in a protective gesture signifying strength and unity. The globe stands for the worldwide mission of the group. The division of the globe stands for day and night readiness. The three stars and the three parts of the shield reflect the insertion methods of the forces---land, sea and air.)

The 720th Special Tactics Group is one of the special operations ground components of the 24th Special Operations Wing, assigned to Air Force Special Operations Command (AFSOC) of the United States Air Force. The group is headquartered at Hurlburt Field, Florida. The group is composed of geographically separated squadrons in four separate states; Florida, New Mexico, North Carolina and Washington.

== Overview ==
The Group's Special Tactics Squadrons are made up of Special Tactics Officers, Combat Controllers, Combat Rescue Officers, Pararescuemen, Special Reconnaissance, Air Liaison Officers, Tactical Air Control Party personnel, and a number of combat support airmen which comprise 58 Air Force specialties.

Special Tactics Squadrons are organized, trained and equipped specifically for various special operations missions facilitating air operations on the battlefield. They conduct combat search and rescue missions, perform battlefield surgery, collect intelligence, as well as call in close air support or airstrikes against enemy combatants and are often partnered with other U.S. special operations forces overseas.

== Subordinate units ==
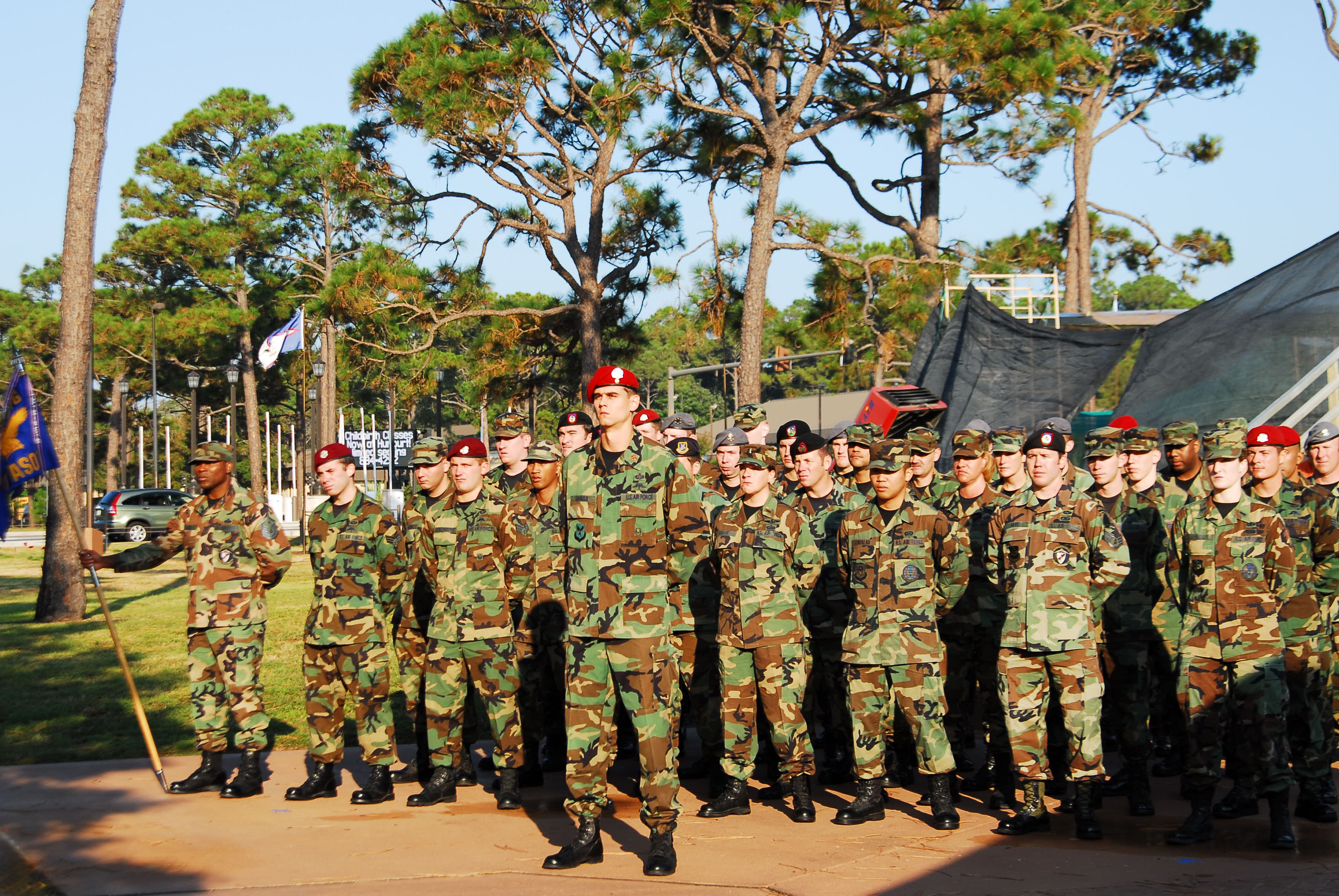
720th airmen during the transition ceremony of the 17th Air Support Operations Squadron from Air Combat Command to Air Force Special Operations Command.

The 720th Special Tactics Group is assigned four special tactics squadrons and a support squadron.

- 21st Special Tactics Squadron at Pope Field, North Carolina
- 22nd Special Tactics Squadron at Joint Base Lewis-McChord (McChord Air Force Base), Washington
- 23rd Special Tactics Squadron at Hurlburt Field, Florida
- 26th Special Tactics Squadron at Cannon Air Force Base, New Mexico
- 720th Operations Support Squadron at Hurlburt Field, Florida

== Other missions ==
The 720th also serves as the functional manager for two special tactics squadrons stationed outside the United States, the 320th Special Tactics Squadron under the 353d Special Operations Group at Kadena Air Base, Japan, and the 321st Special Tactics Squadron under the 352d Special Operations Wing at RAF Mildenhall, England.

There are two Air National Guard units that augments the 720th for training and deployments, the Kentucky Air National Guard's 123rd Special Tactics Squadron, based at Standiford Field, and the Oregon Air National Guard's 125th Special Tactics Squadron, based at Portland International Airport.

== History ==
Prior to May 2014, special operations weather technicians were assigned to the 10th Combat Weather Squadron. The decision was made to integrate these technicians with the other special operators serving in the special tactics squadrons and the squadron was inactivated upon their transfer.

Chief Master Sergeant Aaron deployed from the group's 22d Special Tactics Squadron to Kandahar Province Afghanistan, was awarded the Air Force Cross for his actions on 10 December 2013. CMSgt Aaron and two Army Special Forces teammates had become separated from the main friendly body of troops while infiltrating enemy territory. The three were trapped in a courtyard by intense enemy fire that wounded CMSgt Aaron's two companions. CMSgt Aaron sprinted from his position to the exposed position of the two wounded teammates to defend them. Aaron continued to fight the enemy alone until reinforcements arrived. Once they did, he dragged his teammates to a nearby position of concealment and administered life-saving trauma care.

== Lineage ==
- Designated as the 1720th Special Tactics Group and activated on 1 October 1987
- Redesignated 720th Special Tactics Group on 31 March 1992.

=== Assignments ===
- Twenty-Third Air Force (later Air Force Special Operations Command): 1 October 1987 – 12 June 2012
- 24th Special Operations Wing: 12 June 2012
- Air Force Special Operations Command: 16 May 2025 – present

=== Components ===
- 10th Combat Weather Squadron: 1 August 1996 – 7 May 2014 (Note: Unless indicated, group components are stationed with the group headquarters.)
- 17th Air Support Operations Squadron (later 17th Special Tactics Squadron): 1 October 2008 – present

Ft. Benning, Georgia

- 21st Special Tactics Squadron: 21 May 1996 – present

Pope Air Force Base (later Pope Field, North Carolina

- 22d Special Tactics Squadron, 1 May 1996 – present

Joint Base Lewis-McChord, (McChord Air Force Base), Washington

- 1723rd Combat Control Squadron (later 1723rd Special Tactics Squadron, 23rd Special Tactics Squadron): 1 October 1987 – present
- 1724th Combat Control Squadron (later 1724th Special Tactics Squadron, 24th Special Tactics Squadron): 1 October 1987 – 29 April 2011

Pope Air Force Base (later Pope Field), North Carolina26th Special Tactics Squadron: 28 February 2014 – present
Kirtland Air Force Base, New Mexico

- 720th Operations Support Squadron: 29 November 2004 – present
- Special Tactics Training Squadron, 1 June 2008 – 1 October 2008

=== Stations ===
- Hurlburt Field, Florida 1 Oct 1987 – present

=== Awards ===
Award streamer	Award	Dates	Notes
	Gallant Unit Citation	1 January 2008–30 September 2009	
	Air Force Meritorious Unit Award	1 January 2008–30 September 2009	
	Air Force Outstanding Unit Award w/Combat "V" Device	1 September 2001–31 August 2003	
	Air Force Outstanding Unit Award	1 August 1991-31 July 1993	
	Air Force Outstanding Unit Award	1 August 1993-31 July 1995	
	Air Force Outstanding Unit Award	1 August 1995-31 July 1997	
	Air Force Outstanding Unit Award	1 September 1999-31 August 2001	
	Air Force Outstanding Unit Award	1 August 1997-31 July 1999	

== Commanders ==
- October 1987 – May 1991, Col. John T. Carney
- May 1991 – 1995, Col. Robert W. Neumann
- 1995 – 1997, Col. Craig F. Brotchie
- 1997 – July 1999, Col. James L. Oeser
- July 1999 – July 2001, Col. Jeffrey Buckmelter
- July 2001 – July 2002, Col. Robert H. Holmes
- July 2002 – July 2004, Col. Craig D. Rith
- July 2004 – August 2006, Col. Kenneth F. Rodriguez
- August 2006 – July 2008, Col. Marc F. Stratton
- July 2008 – June 2010, Col. Bradley P. Thompson
- June 2010 – June 2012, Col. Robert G. Armfield
- June 2012 – July 2014, Col. Kurt Buller
