= 26th Special Tactics Squadron =

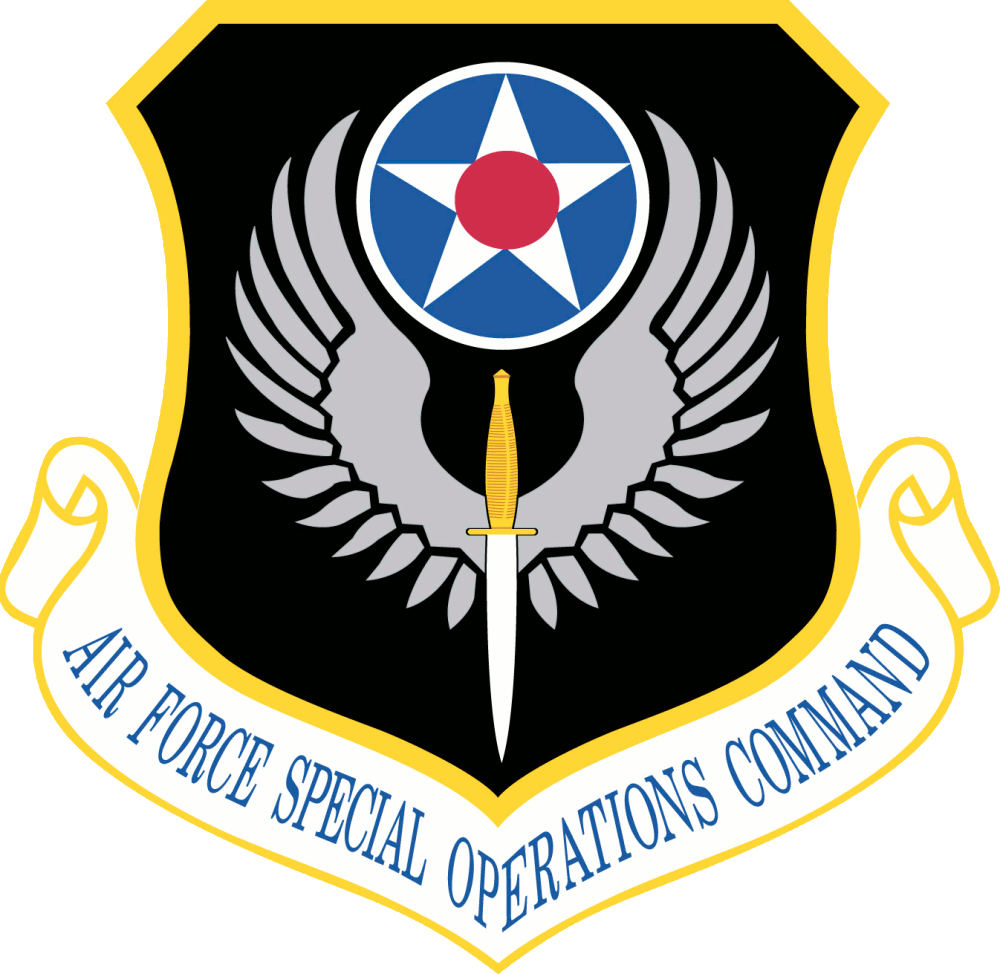
26th Special Tactics Squadron

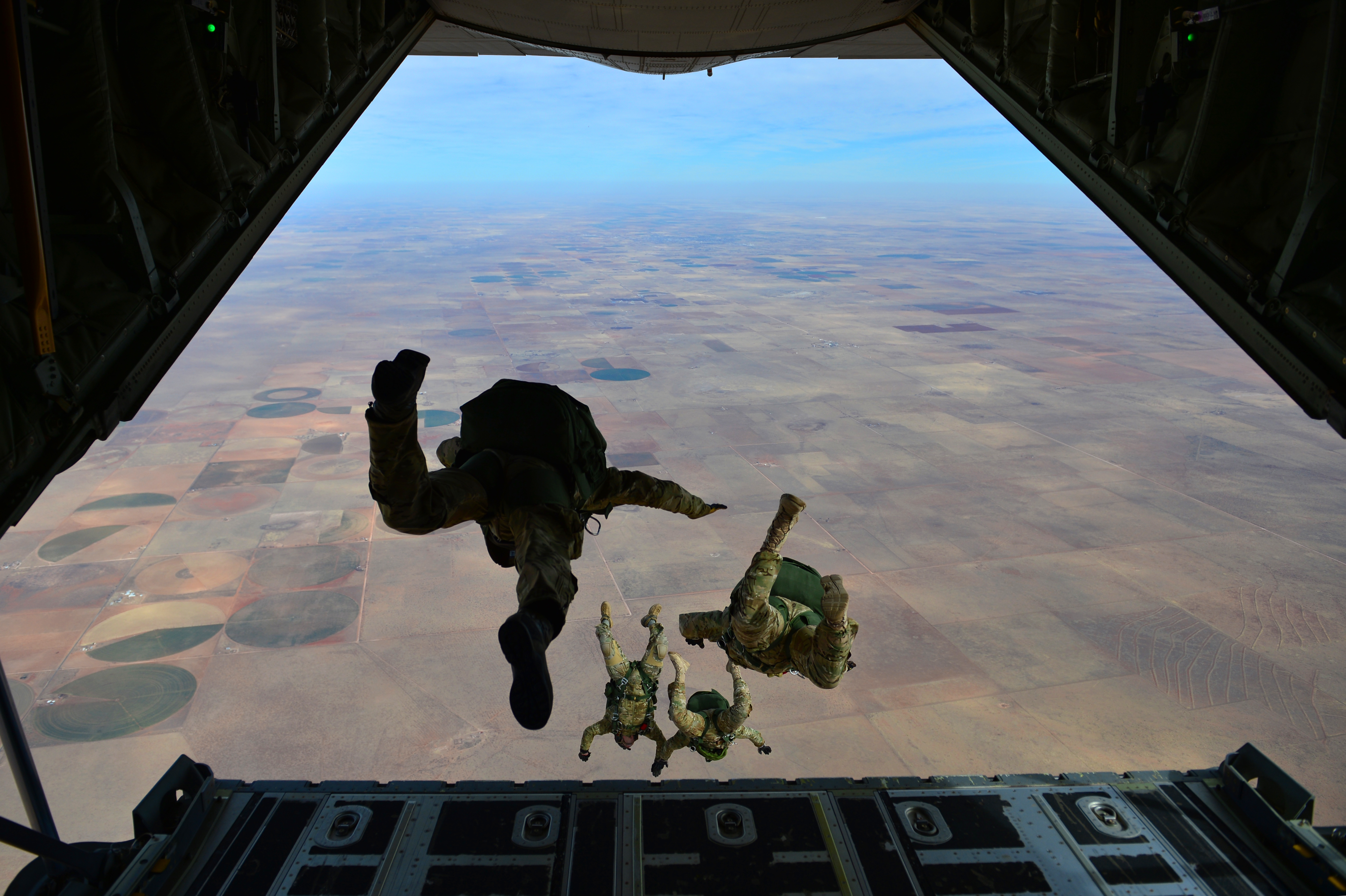
- Members from the 26th Special Tactics Squadron in a free fall jump from an MC-130J Commando II
- Active: 1991–1992; 2014–present
- Country: United States of America
- Branch: United States Air Force
- Type: Special Operations Forces
- Part of: Air Force Special Operations Command; 720th Special Tactics Group
- Garrison/HQ: Cannon AFB
- Motto: Victory or Death
- Decorations: Air Force Meritorious Unit Award Air Force Outstanding Unit Award

Insignia
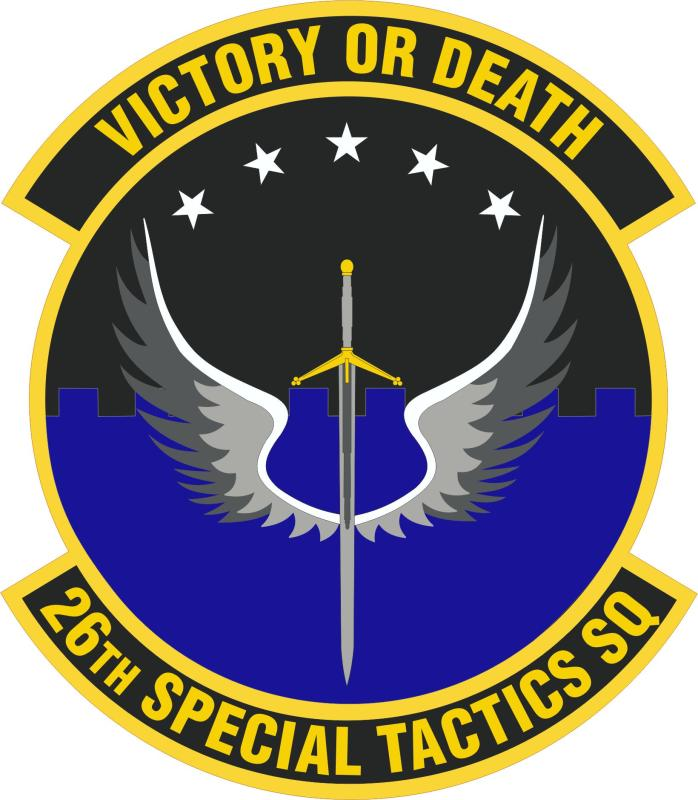
- 26th Special Tactics Squadron emblem (Note: Approved 23 April 2914.)

The 26th Special Tactics Squadron is one of the special tactics units of the United States Air Force Special Operations Command. It is stationed at Cannon Air Force Base, New Mexico. From 1991 to 1992, the squadron's predecessor, the 7026th Special Activities Squadron was stationed in Germany.

== Overview ==
The Squadron is made up of Special Tactics Officers, Combat Controllers, Combat Rescue Officers, Pararescuemen, Special Reconnaissance, Tactical Air Control Party Officers, Tactical Air Control Party Specialists, and a number of combat support airmen which comprise 58 Air Force specialties.

Special Tactics Squadrons are organized, trained and equipped specifically for various special operations missions facilitating air operations on the battlefield. They conduct combat search and rescue missions, collect intelligence, as well as call in close air support or airstrikes against enemy combatants and are often partnered with other U.S. special operations forces overseas.

The squadron absorbed the personnel and equipment of Detachment 1, 720th Special Tactics Group when it was activated in 2014.

== Lineage ==
- Designated and activated as the 7026 Special Activities Squadron on 1 Aug 1991

Inactivated on 1 May 1992
Redesignated as the 26th Special Tactics Squadron
Activated on 28 February 2014

=== Assignments ===
- 86th Fighter Wing (later 86th Wing): 1 August 1991 – 1 May 1992
- 720th Special Tactics Group, 28 February 2014 – present

=== Stations ===
- Zweibruecken Air Base, Germany, 1 August 1991 – 1 May 1992
- Cannon Air Force Base, New Mexico, 28 February 2014 – present
