= 23rd Special Tactics Squadron =

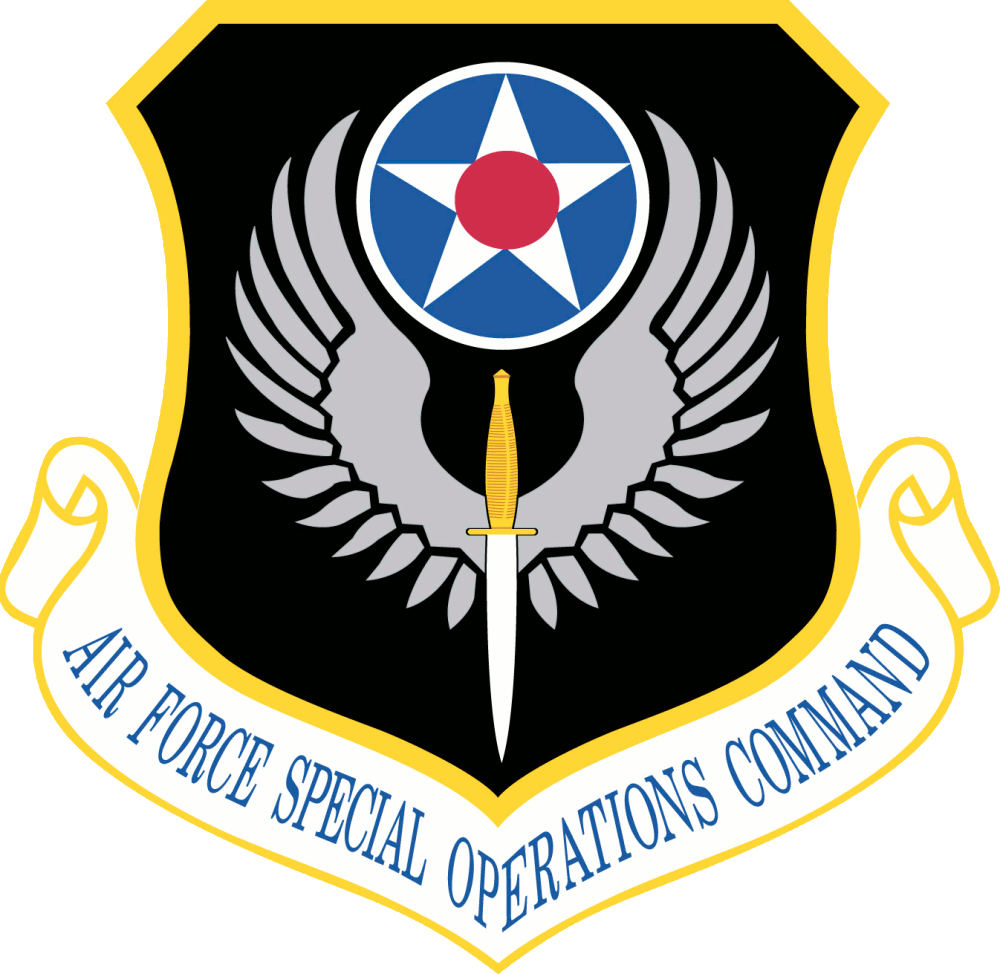
23rd Special Tactics Squadron

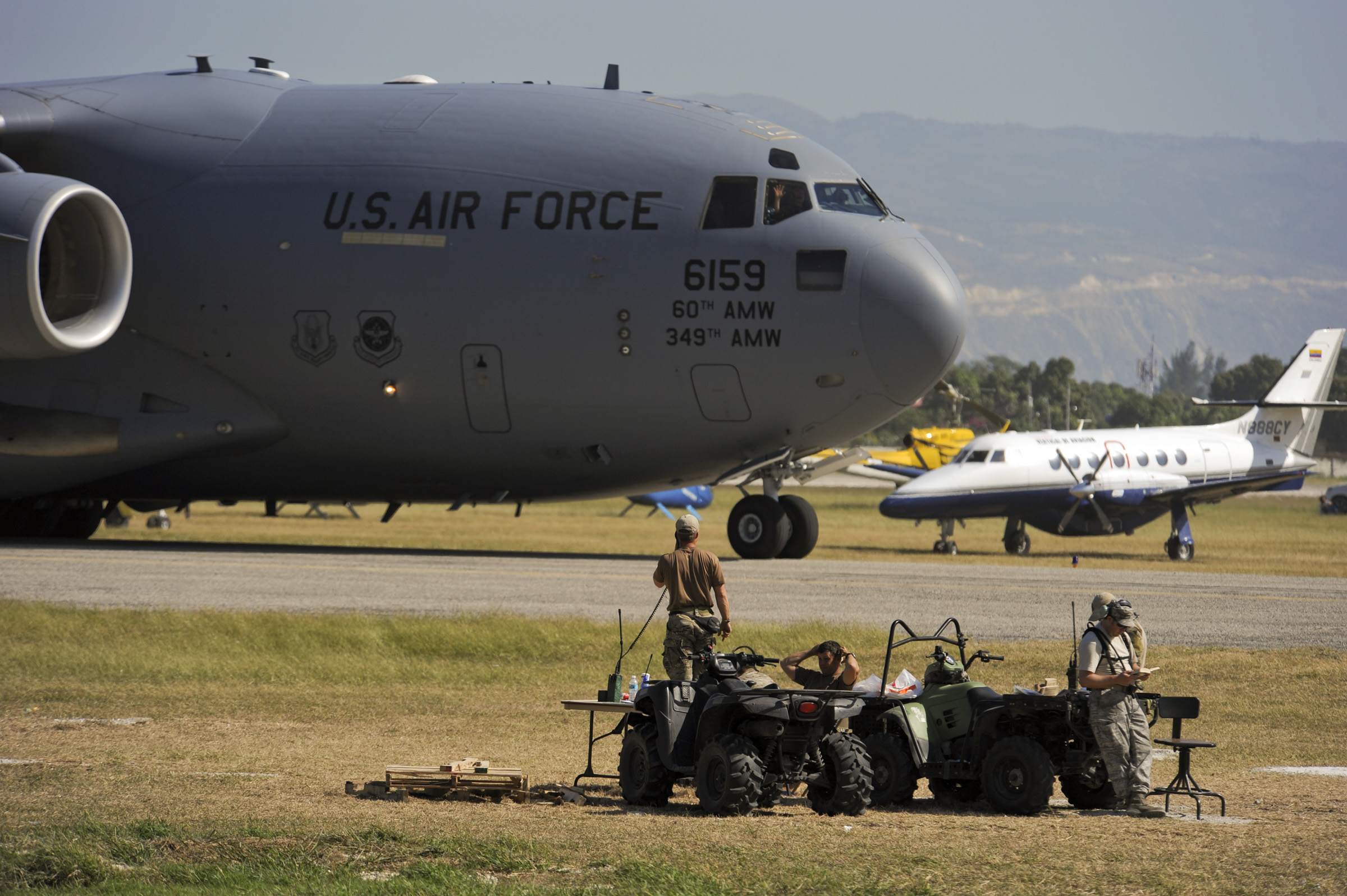
- Airmen of 23rd STS during the Haiti earthquake relief at Toussaint L'Ouverture Airport
- Active: 1943–1945; 1984–present
- Country: United States
- Branch: United States Air Force
- Type: Special operations forces
- Role: Organize, train and equip special tactics forces
- Part of: Air Force Special Operations Command
- Garrison/HQ: Hurlburt Field, FL
- Motto: We Who Dare
- Engagements: War in Afghanistan; Iraq War

Insignia
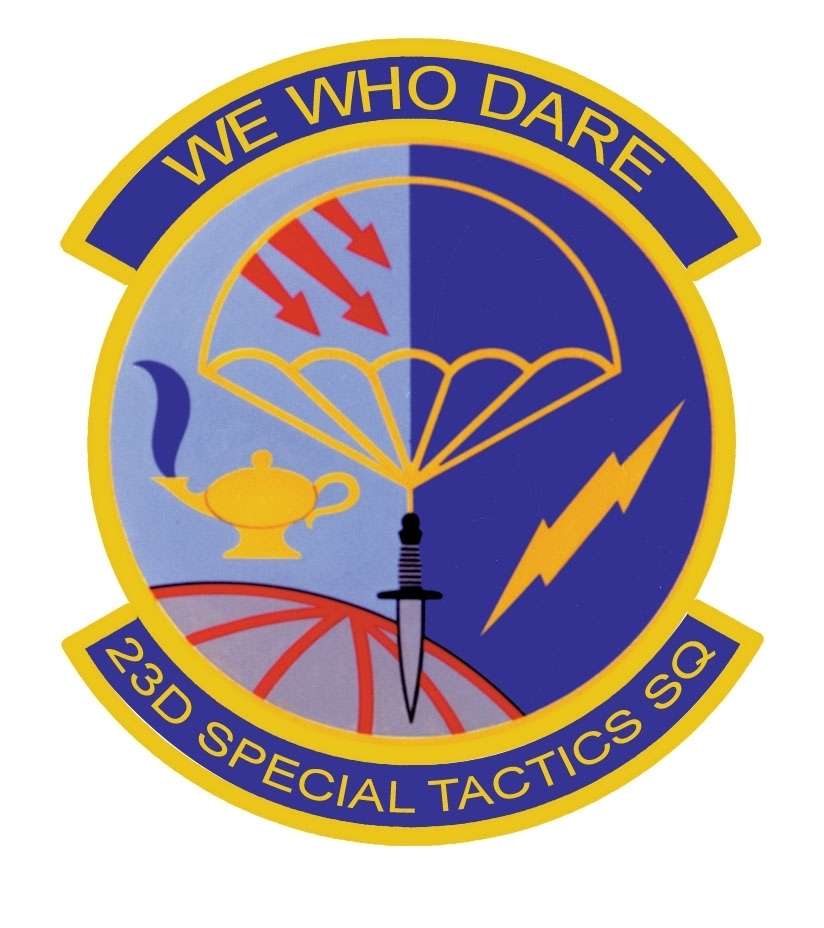
- 23rd Special Tactics Squadron emblem (Note: Approved 1 July 1987.)

The 23rd Special Tactics Squadron is an active ground unit, within the 24th Special Operations Wing United States Air Force Special Operations Command. It is garrisoned at Hurlburt Field, Florida. The squadron was designated the 1723rd Special Tactics Squadron prior to 1992.

== Overview ==
The Squadron is made up of Special Tactics Officers, Combat Controllers, Combat Rescue Officers, Pararescuemen, Special Reconnaissance, Tactical Air Control Party Officers, and Tactical Air Control Party Specialists.

Special tactics squadrons are organized, trained, and equipped specifically for various special operations missions facilitating air operations on the battlefield. They conduct combat search and rescue missions, collect intelligence, as well as call in close air support or airstrikes against enemy combatants and are often partnered with other U.S. special operations forces overseas.

== History ==
The unit was originally established as the 23rd Fighter Control Squadron (Special) on January 10, 1943, and officially activated on February 6, 1943. It was renamed the 23rd Fighter Control Squadron on September 16, 1943. The squadron was inactivated on October 29, 1945, and later disbanded on October 8, 1948. It was reconstituted and consolidated on March 1, 1992, with the 1723rd Combat Control Squadron. Prior to this consolidation, the 1723rd Combat Control Squadron had been redesignated as the 1723rd Special Tactics Squadron on April 1, 1990, and then as the 23rd Special Tactics Squadron on March 31, 1992.

Staff Sergeant Richard Hunter, a combat controller with the 23rd Special Tactics Squadron, received the Air Force Cross for his actions during a battle in Kunduz Province, Afghanistan on 2 November 2016. Hunter was embedded in a joint US Special Forces/Afghan unit that was engaged in a fierce firefight in a village near Kunduz Province, Afghanistan, 2 November 2016. During the eight-hour firefight, He called in 31 danger-close air strikes on enemy forces.

== Operations ==
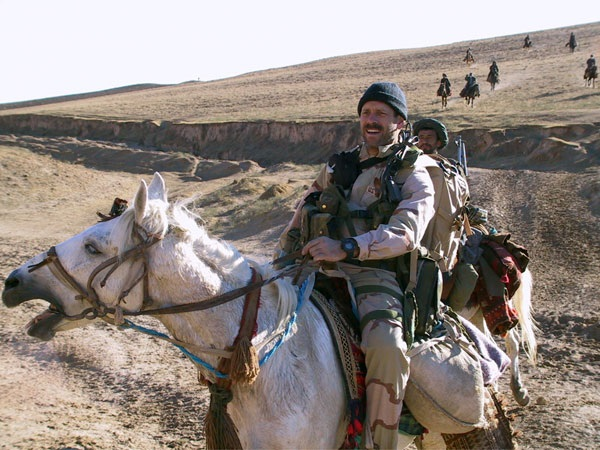
Then-MSgt Bart Decker from the 23rd STS, on horseback in the Balkh valley, during the initial days of the U.S. invasion of Afghanistan in 2001.

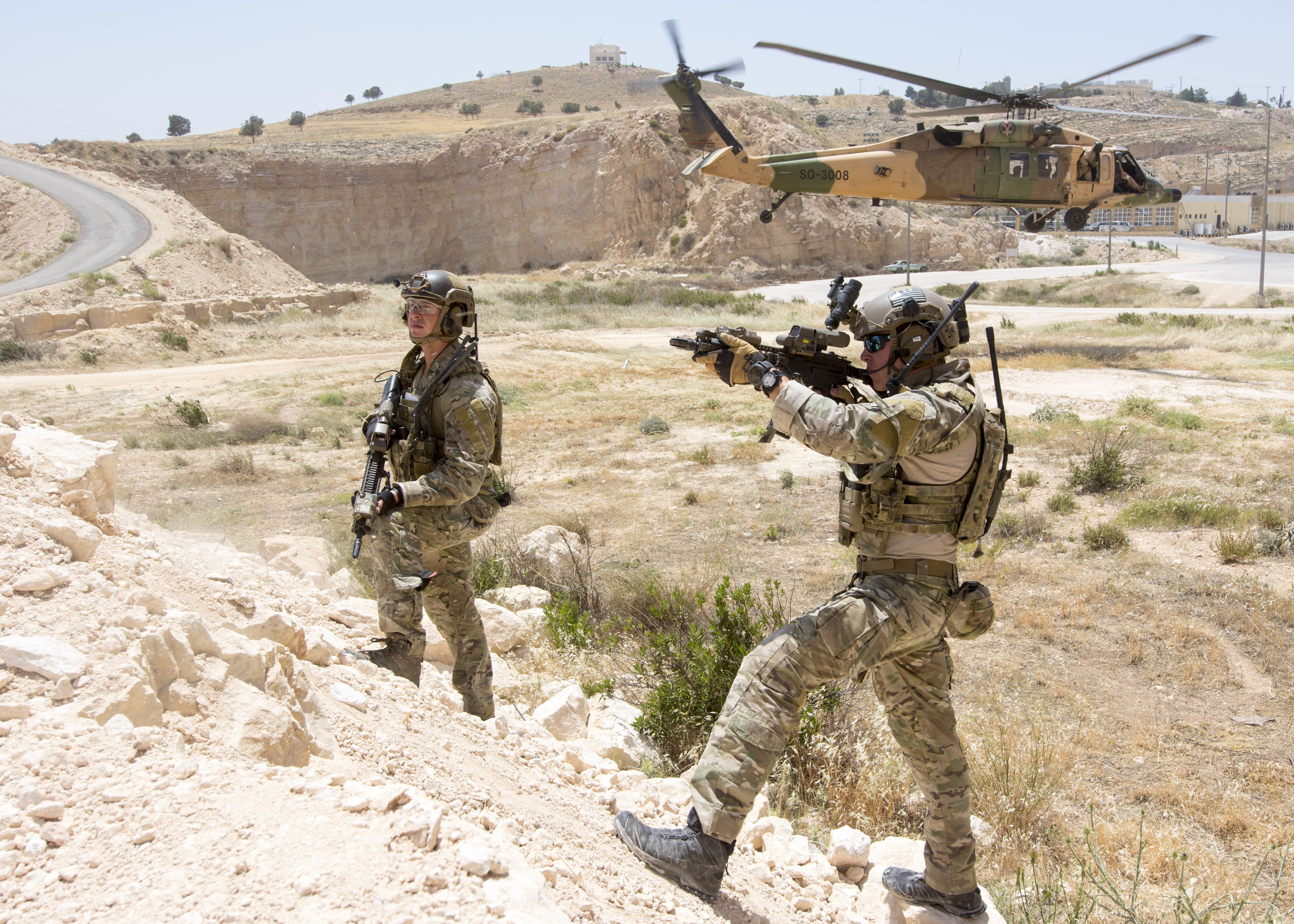
U.S. Air Force Special Tactics Commandos from the 23rd Special Tactics Squadron training in Jordan

Members of the unit have participated in Operation Just Cause (1989), Operation Desert Shield and Operation Desert Storm (1990–1991), Operation Provide Comfort (1991), Operation Allied Force, Kosovo in 1999, and have been engaged in combat since October 2001 in Operation Enduring Freedom (Afghanistan) and Operation Iraqi Freedom. Members of the U.S. Air Force's 23rd Special Tactics Squadron took part in Haiti earthquake relief operations by providing air traffic control operations at Haiti's Toussaint Louverture International Airport. In the aftermath of Hurricane Michael in 2018, the 23rd came to clear and establish the runway at Tyndall Air Force Base.

== Lineage ==
23rd Fighter Control Squadron

- Constituted as the 23rd Fighter Control Squadron (Special) on 10 January 1943

Activated on 6 February 1943
Redesignated 23rd Fighter Control Squadron on 16 September 1943
Inactivated on 29 October 1945
Disbanded on 8 October 1948
Reconstituted and consolidated with the 1723rd Combat Control Squadron on 1 March 1992

23rd Special Tactics Squadron

- Designated as the 1723rd Combat Control Squadron and activated on 1 Jul 1984

Redesignated 1723rd Special Tactics Squadron on 1 April 1990
Consolidated with the 23rd Fighter Control Squadron on 1 March 1992
Redesignated 23rd Special Tactics Squadron on 31 March 1992

=== Assignments ===
- 23rd Fighter Group, 6 February 1943
- Fourteenth Air Force, by December 1943
- 68th Composite Wing, 16 Mar 1945
- Tenth Air Force, 1 August 1945
- Fourteenth Air Force, October 1945 – 29 October 1945
- Twenty-Third Air Force, 1 July 1984
- 1720th Special Tactics Group (later 720 Special Tactics Group), 1 October 1987 – present

=== Stations ===
- Kunming, China, 6 February 1943
- Kweilin, China 21 April 1944
- Liuchow, China, September 1944
- Kunming, China, September 1944
- China, 6 January–October 1945
- Camp Kilmer, New Jersey, 27-28 October 1945
- Eglin Auxiliary Airfield #9 (later Hurlburt Field), Florida, 1 July 1984 – present

== See also ==
- List of United States Air Force special tactics squadrons
