= List of United States Air Force special tactics squadrons =

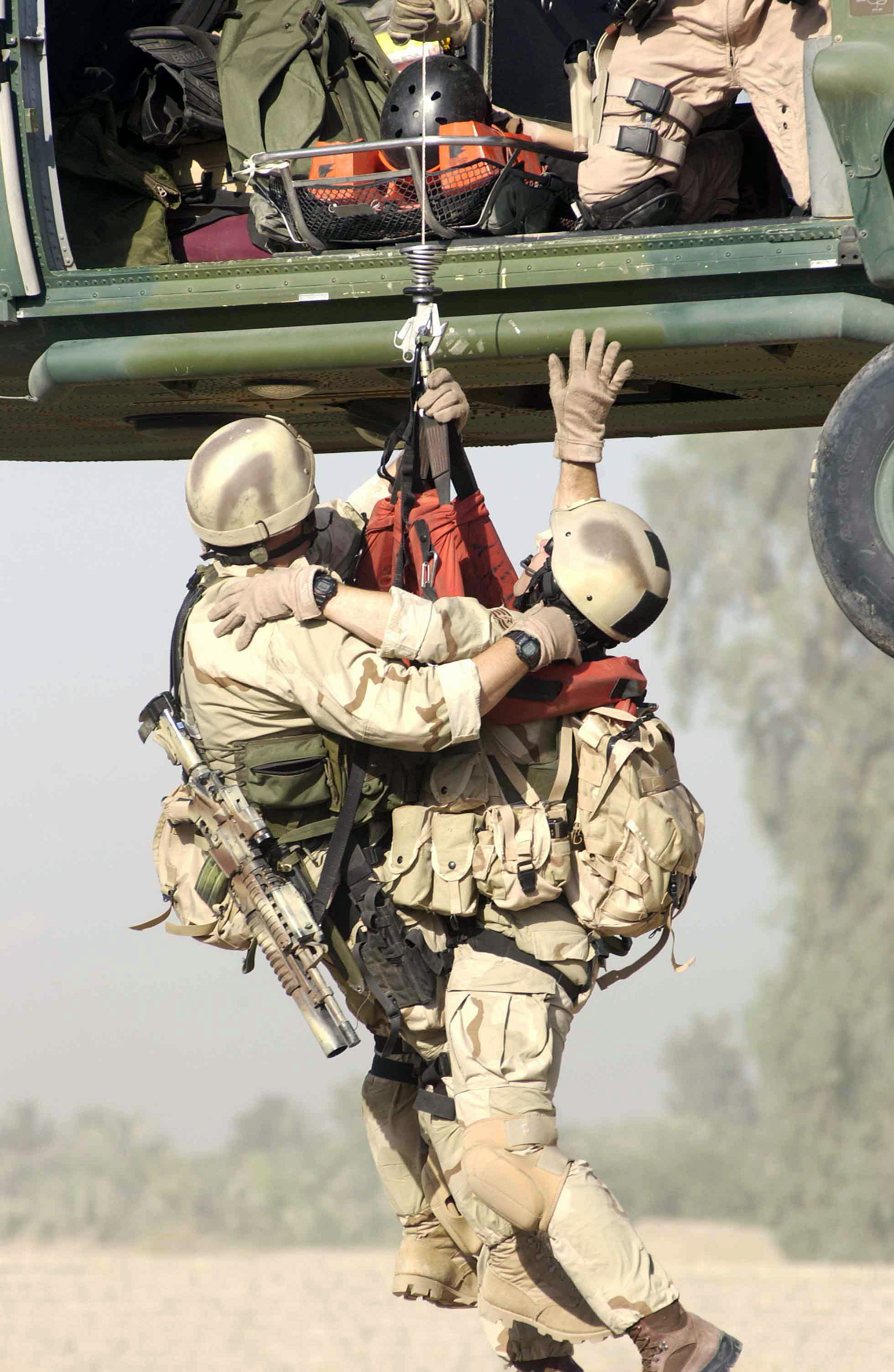
Pararescuemen performing a hoist extraction during a training exercise

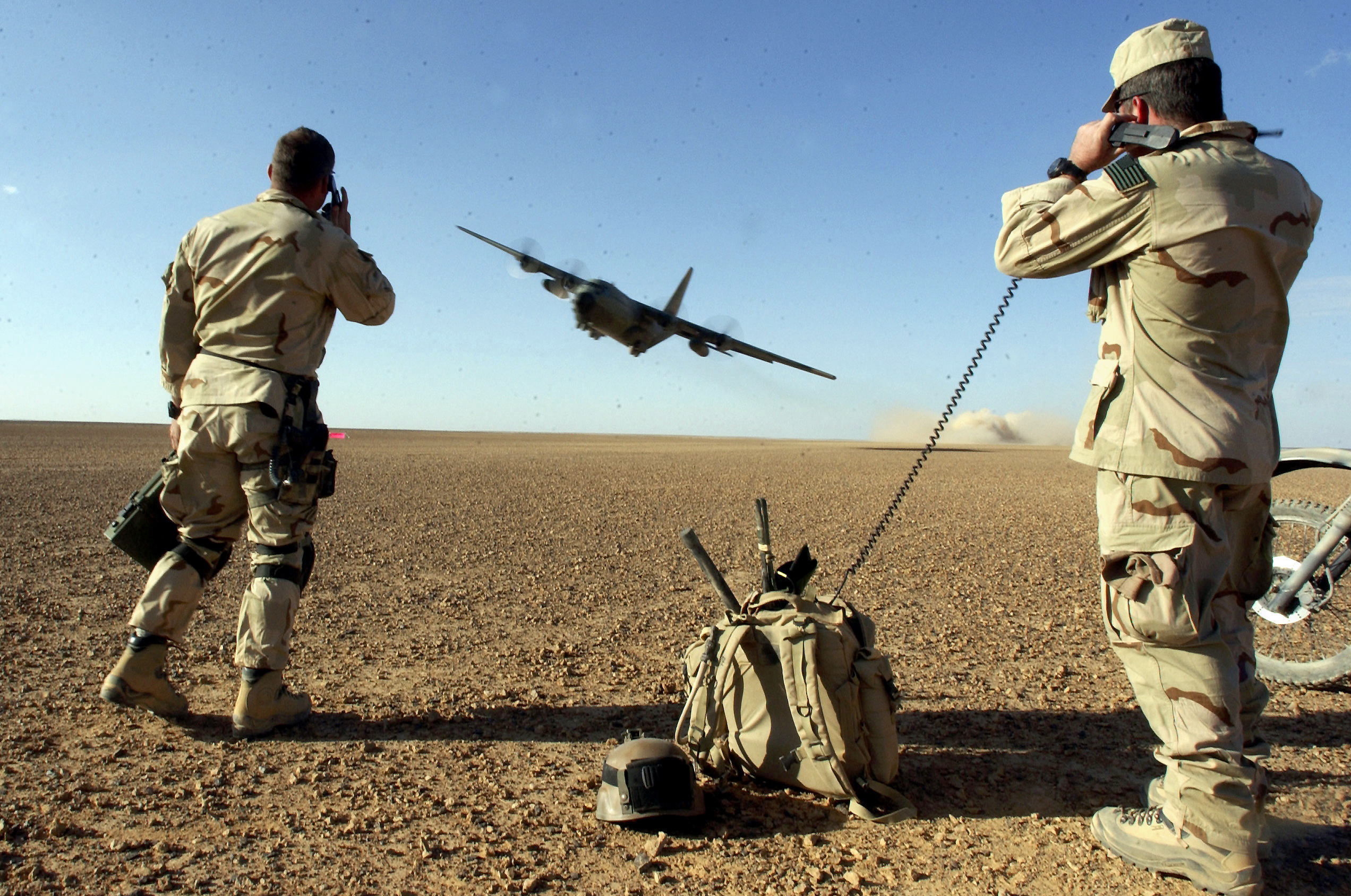
Combat Controllers guiding a C-130 while taking off at a remote airfield

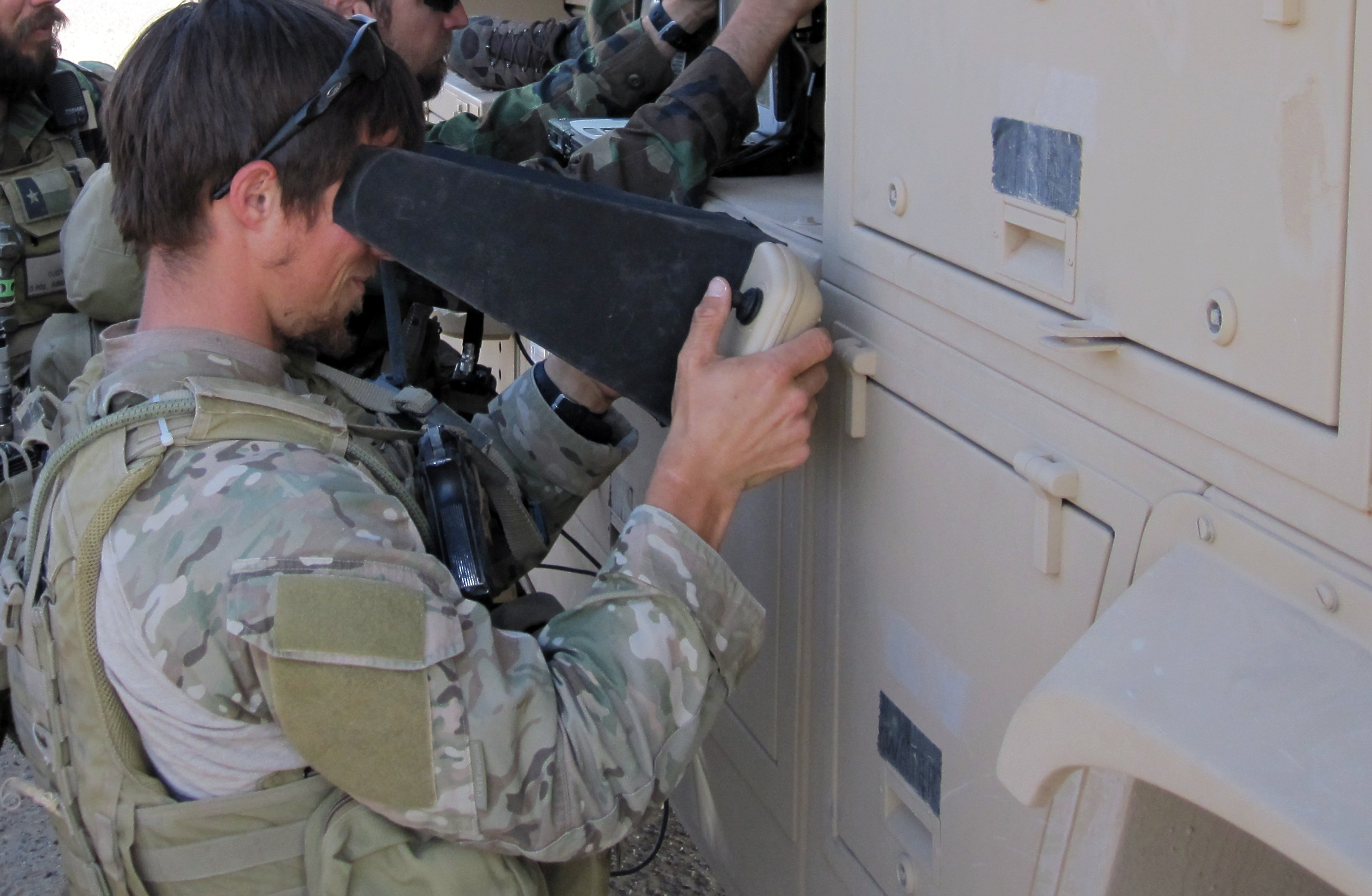
A Special Operations Weather Tech pilots an RQ-11B UAV in Afghanistan

This is a list of United States Air Force special tactics squadrons. It covers special operations forces units assigned to Air Force Special Operations Command in the United States Air Force.

Special Tactics Squadrons consist of Special Tactics Officers, Combat Controllers, Combat Rescue Officers, Pararescuemen, Special Reconnaissance, Tactical Air Control Party operators, and a number of combat support airmen which comprise 58 Air Force specialties.

== Special Tactics Squadrons ==
Squadron	Emblem	Location	Wing	Status	Notes:
17th Special Tactics Squadron		Fort Benning, Georgia	24 SOW	Active	
21st Special Tactics Squadron		Pope Field, North Carolina	24 SOW	Active	
22nd Special Tactics Squadron		McChord Air Force Base, Washington	24 SOW	Active	
23rd Special Tactics Squadron		Hurlburt Field, Florida	24 SOW	Active	
24th Special Tactics Squadron		Pope Field, North Carolina	24 SOW	Active	
26th Special Tactics Squadron		Cannon AFB, New Mexico	24 SOW	Active	
123rd Special Tactics Squadron		Louisville IAP, Kentucky	123 AW	Kentucky; ANG	
125th Special Tactics Squadron		Portland IAP, Oregon	142 WG	Oregon; ANG	
320th Special Tactics Squadron		Kadena AB, Japan	353 SOW	Active	
321st Special Tactics Squadron		RAF Mildenhall, England	352 SOW	Active	

== See also ==
- List of United States Air Force squadrons
- List of United States Air Force special operations squadrons
