= Valorous Unit Award =

United States military award

- Valorous Unit Award Emblem
- Type: Unit award
- Awarded for: Extraordinary heroism in action against an armed enemy of the United States.
- Presented by: United States Department of the Army
- Eligibility: Units of the United States Armed Forces and cobelligerent nations.
- Status: Currently awarded
- Established: 1966
- Final award: On going
- Valorous Unit Award Streamer

Precedence
- Next (higher): Joint Meritorious Unit Award
- Equivalent: Naval Service: Navy Unit Commendation; Air and Space Forces: Gallant Unit Citation; Coast Guard: Coast Guard Unit Commendation; Department of Transportation: Secretary of Transportation Outstanding Unit Award
- Next (lower): Meritorious Unit Commendation

The Valorous Unit Award (VUA) is the second highest United States Army unit decoration which may be bestowed upon an Army unit after the Presidential Unit Citation (PUC). The VUA is awarded by the United States Army to units of the United States Armed Forces or cobelligerent nations which display extraordinary heroism in action against an armed enemy of the United States on or after 3 August 1963. The unit degree of heroism required is considered the equivalent of the individual degree of heroism required for the Silver Star which is awarded for gallantry in action.

== Background ==
As a result of a request from the Commander, USMACV, to expand the scope of the Meritorious Unit Commendation to include acts of valor, a review of the unit awards program was conducted in 1965. The study concluded that a gap did exist in the awards program. The Distinguished Unit Citation (renamed Army Presidential Unit Citation on November 3, 1966) was awarded for gallantry in action for heroism that would warrant the Distinguished Service Cross for an individual. There was no lesser unit award for heroism. Based on the study, it was recommended the scope of the Meritorious Unit Commendation be expanded to include acts of heroism. The CSPER disapproved the recommendation and in a memorandum to the CSA, dated 7 January 1966, it recommended a Valorous Unit Award be adopted to signify unit gallantry in combat to a degree equivalent to that required for award of a Silver Star to an individual. The recommendation with the proposed design was approved by the Chief of Staff, Army, on 12 January 1966.

The Valorous Unit Award Emblem is awarded and worn by all members of the cited unit. The emblem is considered an individual decoration, and those members of the unit awarded the VUA continue to wear the emblem after they leave the unit. Other personnel assigned to the unit awarded the VUA who were not members of the unit during the time of action for the award, may wear the emblem to indicate the unit they serve in has received the VUA, but these members of the unit can no longer wear the emblem once they leave the unit.

== Criteria ==
The Valorous Unit Award (VUA) is to be awarded to units of the United States Armed Forces for extraordinary heroism in action against an armed enemy of the United States while engaged in military operations involving conflict with an opposing foreign force or while serving with friendly foreign forces engaged in an armed conflict against an opposing armed force in which the United States is not a belligerent part for actions occurring on or after 3 August 1963. The VUA requires a lesser degree of gallantry, determination, and esprit de corps than that required for the Presidential Unit Citation (PUC). Nevertheless, the unit must have performed with marked distinction under difficult and hazardous conditions in accomplishing its mission so as to set it apart from the other units participating in the same conflict. The degree of heroism required is the same as that which would warrant award of the Silver Star to an individual. Extended periods of combat duty or participation in a large number of operational missions, either ground or air, is not sufficient. This award will normally be earned by units that have participated in single or successive actions covering relatively brief time spans. It is not reasonable to presume that entire units can sustain Silver Star performance for extended time periods under the most unusual circumstances. Only on rare occasions will a unit larger than a battalion qualify for this award.

== Description and components ==
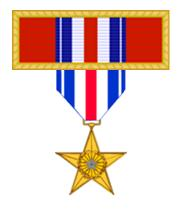
Comparison of the Valorous Unit Award with the Silver Star.

The ribbon worn to represent award of the Valorous Unit Award is 1 7/16 inches wide and 9/16 inch in height. The emblem consists of a 1/16 inch wide Gold frame with laurel leaves which encloses a ribbon of the pattern of the Silver Star Medal ribbon centered on a Red ribbon. The stripe dimensions of the ribbon are: 3/8 inch Old Glory Red 67156; 1/16 inch Ultramarine Blue 67118; 1/64 inch White 67101; 3/32 inch Ultramarine Blue; 3/32 inch White; center 3/32 inch Old Glory Red; 3/32 inch White; 3/32 inch Ultramarine Blue; 1/64 inch White; 1/16 inch Ultramarine Blue; and 3/8 inch Old Glory Red. The streamers are the same pattern as the Silver Star Medal ribbon. The current components of the award are the VUA emblems, certificates, and citations awarded to the members of the unit, and the VUA streamer for display on the unit flag/guidon.

- Valorous Unit Award: MIL-D-3943/32 (frame) and MIL-R-11589/154 (ribbon). NSN-8455-00-964-4296.
- Streamer: MIL-S-14650/5. Manual requisition in accordance with Chapter 9, Army Regulation (AR) 840–10.

== See also ==
- Awards and decorations of the United States military
- Awards and decorations of the United States Army
- List of military decorations
