= Meritorious Unit Commendation =

Mid-level unit award of the United States Armed Forces

- Army Meritorious Unit Commendation Navy Meritorious Unit Commendation Coast Guard Meritorious Unit Commendation
- Type: Service Ribbon (unit decoration)
- Awarded for: Valorous or meritorious achievement or service, or exceptionally meritorious conduct and outstanding achievement or service, in combat or non-combat.
- Presented by: the United States Department of the Army; United States Department of the Navy; United States Department of Homeland Security
- Eligibility: Military Unit
- Status: Currently awarded
- First award: 1944
- Final award: Ongoing
- Streamers: Army MUC, Navy MUC, and Coast Guard MUC

Precedence
- Next (higher): Army: Valorous Unit Award; Naval: Navy Unit Commendation; Air and Space Forces: Gallant Unit Citation; Coast Guard: Coast Guard Unit Commendation; Department of Transportation: Secretary of Transportation Outstanding Unit Award
- Equivalent: Air and Space Forces: Meritorious Unit Award
- Next (lower): Army: Superior Unit Award; Naval Service: Navy "E" Ribbon; Air and Space Forces: Air and Space Outstanding Unit Award; Coast Guard: Meritorious Team Commendation

The Meritorious Unit Commendation (MUC; pronounced muck) is a mid-level unit award of the United States Armed Forces. The U.S. Army awards units the Army MUC for exceptionally meritorious conduct in performance of outstanding achievement or service in combat or non-combat, the U.S. Navy and U.S. Marine Corps award units the Navy MUC for valorous or meritorious achievement or service in combat or non-combat, and the U.S. Coast Guard awards units the Coast Guard MUC for valorous or meritorious achievement or service not involving combat.

== Army ==
Army Meritorious Unit Commendation

The Army MUC emblem worn to represent award of the MUC is 1 7/16 inches wide and 9/16 inches in height. The emblem consists of a 1/16 inch wide gold frame with laurel leaves which encloses a scarlet 67111 ribbon. The previously authorized emblem was a gold color embroidered laurel wreath, 1 5/8 inches in diameter on a 2 inches square of olive drab cloth.

The Army MUC (previously called the Meritorious Service Unit Plaque) is awarded to units for exceptionally meritorious conduct in performance of outstanding services for at least six continuous months during the period of military operations against an armed enemy occurring on or after 1 January 1944. Service in a combat zone is not required, but must be directly related to the combat effort. Units based in CONUS are excluded from this award, as are other units outside the area of operation. The unit must display such outstanding devotion and superior performance of exceptionally difficult tasks as to set it apart and above other units with similar missions. The degree of achievement required is the same as that which would warrant award of the Legion of Merit (LOM) to an individual. Recommendations for units larger than a brigade will not be submitted. For services performed during World War II, awards will be made only to service units and only for services performed between 1 January 1944 and 15 September 1946.

The Meritorious Service Unit Plaque was originally established by War Department Circular No. 345 on 23 August 1944. The circular provided that members of units which received the Plaque were entitled to wear the Meritorious Service Unit Insignia, a two-inch square olive drab patch with an image of a golden wreath on the right sleeves of their service coats and shirts, four inches from the end of the sleeve. A gold star placed inside the wreath on the insignia represented additional awards, until War Department Circular No. 54, 1946, provided that additional awards would be shown by placing a gold numeral on the inside of the wreath. In December 1946, the Meritorious Service Unit Plaque was eliminated, replaced with the issue of the Meritorious Unit Commendation.

A new design of the Meritorious Service Unit Emblem, a solid red ribbon bordered by a golden wreath to be worn on the right breast of the service coat immediately above the pocket, was approved in April 1947. This replaced the sleeve insignia and was to be effective 1 January 1949. On 16 May 1947, Army Regulation 260-15 announced the MUC, granted the wear of the MUC emblem, and provided for the display of the scarlet MUC streamer, with the name of the applicable theater of operations in white letters. On 11 April 1949, The Adjutant General advised D/PA that the stock position was such that the sleeve patch would not be exhausted prior to 1959. By Comment 2, 1 March 1960, Deputy Chief of Staff, Personnel (G-1) stated that for planning purposes, the new Meritorious Service Unit emblem would be authorized for wear on or after 1 January 1961, with wear of the old one prohibited after 30 June 1962. However, the stock level was still so high that the ribbon was not introduced into the supply system until 14 July 1966.

Effective 1 March 1961, the MUC was authorized for units or detachments of the armed forces of the United States for exceptionally meritorious conduct in performance of outstanding services for at least six continuous months (a month is considered 30 calendar days) during military operations against an armed enemy without regard to duties performed or the type of unit performing the duties. Such service is interpreted to relate to combat service support type activities and not to the type of activities performed by senior headquarters, combat, or combat support units.

Effective 11 September 2001, the MUC is authorized for units and/or detachments of the Armed Forces of the United States for exceptionally meritorious performance for at least six continuous months (a month is considered 30 calendar days) during military operations against an armed enemy without regard to type of duties performed or the type of unit performing the duties.

All members of the unit cited for the award are approved to wear the emblem of the MUC. The emblem is thought of as an individual decoration for those in connection with the cited acts and is approved to be worn if they continue as members with the unit or not. Other personnel serving with the unit are approved to wear the emblem to show that the unit is a recipient of the MUC.

The Army Meritorious Unit Commendation is worn after the Valorous Unit Award and before the Superior Unit Award. Additional awards of the Army MUC are denoted by bronze oak leaf clusters.

Permanent Orders 194-13

Permanent Orders 032-0001

== Navy and Marine Corps ==
Navy Meritorious Unit Commendation

The Navy MUC was authorized by SECNAV Notice 1650 on 17 July 1967 and is awarded by the Secretary of the Navy, Chief of Naval Operations, or Commandant of the Marine Corps to any unit of the Navy or Marine Corps that has distinguished itself, under combat or non-combat conditions, by either valorous or meritorious achievement, which renders the unit outstanding compared to other units performing similar service, but not sufficient to justify award of the Navy Unit Commendation. This award may also be conferred upon units of the other branches of the U.S. Armed Forces, and the armed forces of friendly foreign nations serving with U.S. Armed Forces, provided such units meet the standards established for Navy and Marine Corps units. To justify this award, the unit must have performed service of a character comparable to that which would merit the award of a Bronze Star Medal, or achievement of like caliber in a non-combat situation, to an individual. Normal performance of duty or participation in many combat missions does not, in itself, justify the award. An award will not be made to a unit for actions of one or more of its component parts, unless the unit performed uniformly as a team in a manner fully justifying collective recognition.

The Navy Meritorious Unit Commendation is worn after the Navy Unit Commendation and before the Navy "E" Ribbon. Additional awards of the Navy MUC are denoted by 3/16 inch bronze stars.

== Coast Guard ==
Coast Guard Meritorious Unit Commendation

The Coast Guard MUC was established in November 1973, and is awarded in the name of the Commandant of the Coast Guard. The MUC may be awarded to any unit of the Coast Guard that has distinguished itself by either valorous or meritorious achievement or service in support of Coast Guard operations not involving combat. The Commandant may also bestow the award upon a unit of another branch of the Armed Forces of the United States, provided the unit meets the standards established for Coast Guard units. To justify the award, the service performed as a unit must be comparable to that which would meet the award of a Coast Guard Achievement Medal (CGAM) to an individual. Normal performance of duty or participation in a large number of operational missions does not in itself justify the award. A Coast Guard MUC will not be awarded to a large unit for actions of one or more of its sub-units unless the entire unit performed as a team.

The Coast Guard MUC is worn after the Coast Guard Unit Commendation and before the Coast Guard Meritorious Team Commendation. Additional awards of the Coast Guard MUC are denoted by 5/16 inch gold stars. The MUC may also be awarded with the Operational Distinguishing Device, denoted by a 1/4 inch silver letter "O" centered on the ribbon.

== See also ==
- Awards and decorations of the United States military
