= United States Air Force Special Tactics Officer =

U.S. Air Force special tactics officer (STO)
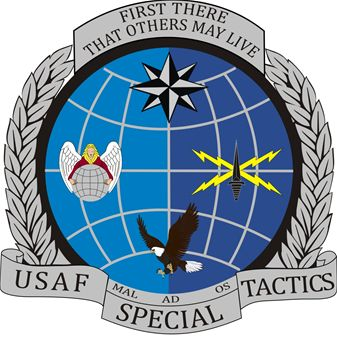
- Country: United States of America
- Branch: United States Air Force
- Type: Special operations
- Part of: Air Force Special Operations Command (AFSOC)
- Nicknames: STO, Air Commando
- Motto: ""First There... That Others May Live""

Insignia
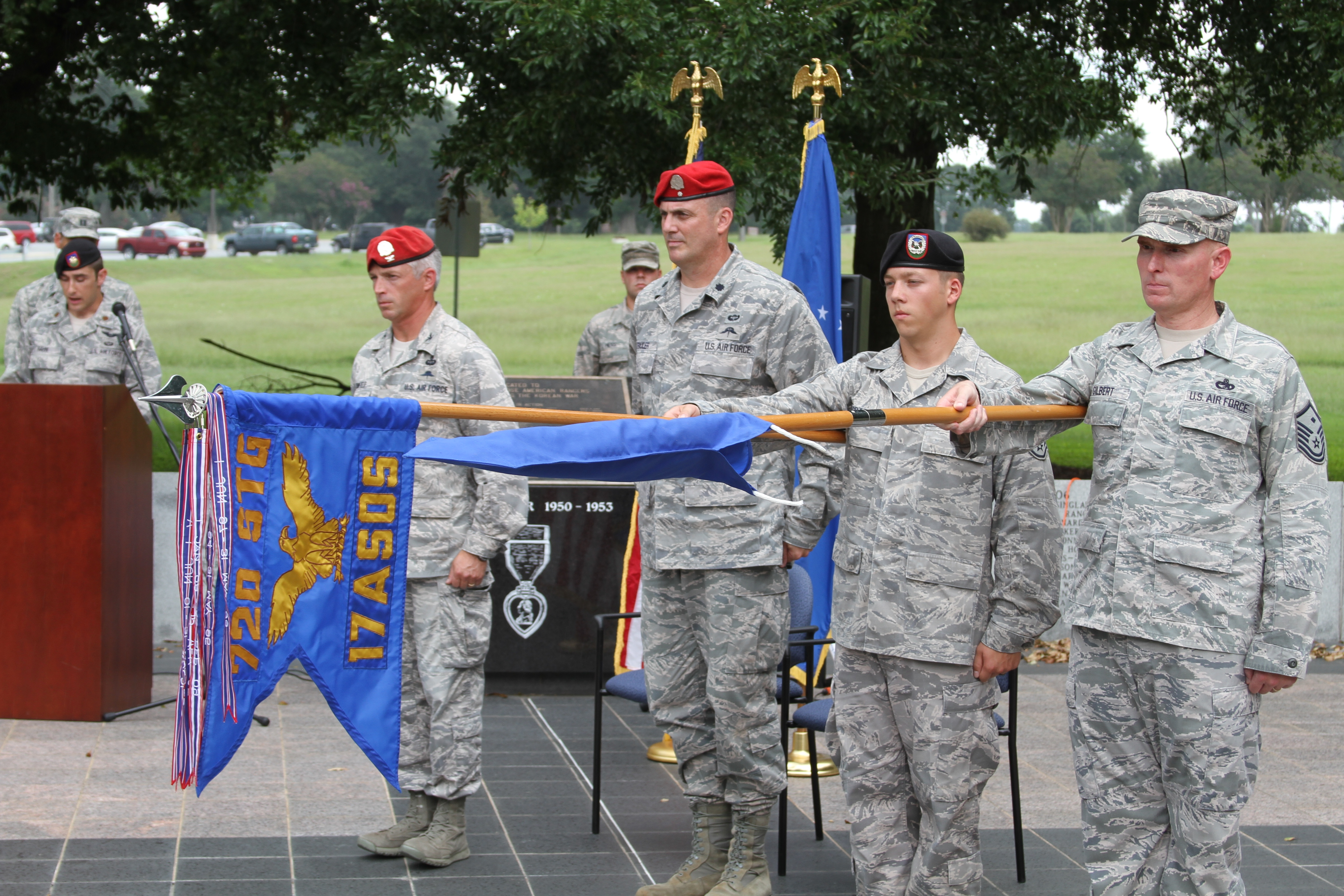
- Scarlet beret worn by both USAF special tactics officers and combat controllers: A STO wearing scarlet beret with STO Crest and miniature rank insignia

A United States Air Force Special Tactics Officer (AFSC 19ZXA) is a United States Air Force Special Operations Command (AFSOC) special warfare officer who manages the training and equipping of U.S. Air Force ground special operations. Special Tactics Officers deploy as team leaders or mission commanders in combat, seizing and controlling airstrips, combat search and rescue, guiding airstrikes and fire support using air assets for special operations and tactical weather observations and forecasting. Special Tactics Officers are not pararescuemen, combat controllers, or special reconnaissance, but they lead the Special Tactics Squadrons and Groups and thoroughly understand how to conduct, manage, and provide these special operations missions to both conventional and joint special operations missions needed within Joint Special Operations Command (JSOC) and United States Special Operations Command (SOCOM).

== Training ==
Special Tactics Officers lead U.S. Air Force pararescuemen, U.S. Air Force combat controllers and U.S. Air Force special reconnaissance. They do not have their own training course, instead they go through the Combat Control training while Combat Rescue Officers attend Pararescue training. Many attain qualifications as Joint terminal attack controllers. Their 35-week initial training and unique mission skills earn them the right to wear the scarlet beret akin to Combat Controllers. From that point they attend a 12-15 month advanced skill training course. Air Force Times reported that an Air Force captain became the first female Special Tactics Officer (STOs) of Special Tactics Teams (STTs) on 23 June 2022.

=== Initial training ===
- Combat Control Selection Course, Lackland Air Force Base, Texas (2 weeks)

This selection course focuses on sports physiology, nutrition, basic exercises, combat control history and fundamentals.

- Combat Control Operator Course, Keesler Air Force Base, Mississippi (15.5 weeks)

This course teaches aircraft recognition and performance, air navigation aids, weather, airport traffic control, flight assistance service, communication procedures, conventional approach control, radar procedures and air traffic rules. All air traffic controllers in the Air Force attend this course.

- Air Force Basic Survival School, Fairchild Air Force Base, Washington (3 weeks)

This course teaches techniques for survival in remote areas. Instruction includes principles, procedures, equipment and techniques that enable individuals to survive, regardless of climatic conditions or unfriendly environments, and return home.

- Army Airborne School, Fort Benning, Georgia (3 weeks)

Trainees learn the basic parachuting skills required to infiltrate an objective area by static line airdrop.

- Combat Control School, Pope Air Force Base, North Carolina (13 weeks)

This course provides final Combat Controller qualifications. Training includes physical training, small unit tactics, land navigation, communications, assault zones, demolitions, fire support and field operations including parachuting. Graduates of the course are awarded the 3-skill level (Apprentice), scarlet beret and CCT flash. The Combat Control School Heritage Foundation (CCSHF) funding drive supports education and training at the Combat Control School.

=== Advanced training ===
- Special Tactics Advanced Skills Training, Hurlburt Field, Florida (12 to 15 months)

Advanced Skills Training is a program for newly assigned Air Force Special Tactics operators. AST produces mission-ready operators for the Air Force, Joint Special Operations Command and United States Special Operations Command. The AST schedule is broken down into four phases: water, ground, employment and full mission profile. The course tests the trainee's personal limits through demanding mental and physical training. Special Tactics Officers also attend the following schools during AST:

- Army Military Free Fall Parachutist School, Fort Bragg, North Carolina, and Yuma Proving Ground, Arizona (5 weeks)

This course instructs free fall parachuting procedures. The course provides wind tunnel training, in-air instruction focusing on student stability, aerial maneuvers, air sense, parachute opening procedures and parachute canopy control.

- Air Force Combat Diver School, Navy Diving and Salvage Training Center, Naval Support Activity Panama City, Florida (6 weeks)

Trainees become combat divers, learning to use scuba and closed circuit diving equipment to covertly infiltrate denied areas. The course provides training to depths of 130 feet, stressing development of maximum underwater mobility under various operating conditions.

== Notable Special Tactics Officers ==
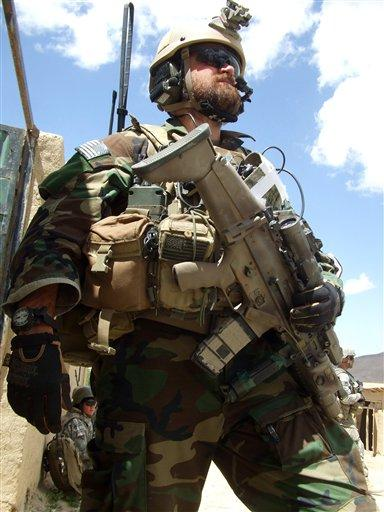
Captain Barry Crawford in Afghanistan, 2010.

In 2010 Captain Barry Crawford, a Special Tactics Officer, was awarded the Air Force Cross for heroism during a 14-hour battle near Laghman Province, Afghanistan, on 4 May 2010. Captain Crawford was the joint terminal attack controller attached to an Army Special Forces team along with Afghan commandos. The team conducted a night time helicopter assault into a village to gather intelligence. After sunrise they came under attack from enemy combatants and several Afghan soldiers were wounded. After calling for a medical evacuation Captain Crawford exposed himself to enemy gunfire by running out into the open in order to guide the helicopter to the landing zone. While he was guiding the helicopter in, one of his radio antennae was shot off of his back. After the helicopter took off, Captain Crawford and the Special Forces team managed to exfiltrate the area without American casualties. During the battle Captain Crawford coordinated close air support, calling in over 40 airstrikes from 33 different aircraft. The AH-64 helicopters and F-15E fighters which were called in eliminated enemy positions and combatants utilizing strafing runs, along with 500- to 2,000-pound bombs and Hellfire missile strikes. The special operations team suffered two Afghan commando casualties, but more than 80 insurgents were believed to have been killed during the engagement, including three high-ranking enemy commanders.

== See also ==
- List of United States Air Force special tactics squadrons
