= Gallant Unit Citation =

- Type: Ribbon
- Awarded for: Extraordinary heroism while engaged in armed combat with an enemy of the United States
- Presented by: the Department of the Air Force
- Eligibility: Military Unit
- Status: Currently awarded
- First award: 2005
- Final award: Ongoing

Highlights
- Total recipients: 7
- Gallant Unit Citation Streamer

Precedence
- Next (higher): Joint Meritorious Unit Award
- Equivalent: Army: Valorous Unit Award; Naval Service: Navy Unit Commendation; Coast Guard: Coast Guard Unit Commendation; Department of Transportation: Secretary of Transportation Outstanding Unit Award
- Individual equivalent: Silver Star
- Next (lower): Meritorious Unit Award

The Gallant Unit Citation (GUC) is a United States Air Force and United States Space Force unit award. It was approved in March 2004 and is awarded to any Air Force or Space Force unit which distinguishes itself by extraordinary heroism while engaged in armed combat with an enemy force on or after 11 September 2001.

== Award description ==
The GUC requires a lesser degree of gallantry, determination and esprit de corps than that required for the Presidential Unit Citation (PUC). The unit must have performed with marked distinction under difficult and hazardous conditions in accomplishing its mission so as to set it apart from and above other units participating in the same conflict. The degree of heroism required is the same as that which would warrant award of the Silver Star to an individual. The GUC will normally be earned by units that have participated in single or successive actions covering relatively brief time spans. Only on rare occasions will a unit larger than a group qualify for the GUC. Extended periods of combat duty or participation in a large number of operational missions, either air or ground, is not sufficient. Additional awards of the Gallant Unit Citation are denoted by oak leaf clusters.

== Cited units ==
The only units to date that have received this award are the 621st Contingency Response Wing, 385th Air Expeditionary Group,352d Special Operations Group, the 332d Air Expeditionary Group, the 379th Air Expeditionary Wing, the 16th Operations Group (redesignated as the 1st Special Operations Group in 2006), the 720th Special Tactics Group, 74th Fighter Squadron and the 79th Fighter Generation Squadron, as well as units subordinate to each during the cited time frame. As of July 7th, 2026 the 40th Airlift Squadron was awarded.

Subordinate units to the 16th Operations Group receiving the award

- 4th Special Operations Squadron
- 6th Special Operations Squadron
- 8th Special Operations Squadron
- 9th Special Operations Squadron
- 15th Special Operations Squadron
- 16th Special Operations Squadron
- 19th Special Operations Squadron
- 20th Special Operations Squadron
- 16th Operations Support Squadron
- 16th Operations Group, Operating Location D
- 919th Special Operations Group
- 711th Special Operations Squadron
- 919th Operations Support Squadron
- 5th Special Operations Squadron
- AFSOC Air Operations
- Operating Location JM1 Air Force Element Medical
- Air Force Element Medical DoD, Operating Location Special Operations Squadron

816th Expeditionary Airlift Squadron and 385th Expeditionary Airlift Group in support of Operation ALLIES REFUGE.
