= Meritorious Unit Award (U.S. Air and Space Forces) =

Mid-level unit award of the United States Air Force

- Meritorious Unit Award ribbon
- Type: Unit award
- Awarded for: Exceptionally meritorious conduct in the performance of outstanding achievement or service in direct support of combat operations for at least 90 continuous days during the period of military operations against an armed enemy of the United States on or after 11 September 2001.
- Presented by: the Department of the Air Force
- Eligibility: Air Force and Space Force squadrons, groups, wings, and deltas
- Status: Currently awarded
- First award: 2004
- Final award: On going
- MUA Streamer

Precedence
- Next (higher): Army: Valorous Unit Award; Naval Service: Navy Unit Commendation; Air and Space Forces: Gallant Unit Citation; Coast Guard: Coast Guard Unit Commendation
- Equivalent: Army, Naval Service, and Coast Guard: Meritorious Unit Commendation, Meritorious Team Commendation
- Next (lower): Army: Superior Unit Award; Naval Service: Navy "E" Ribbon; Air and Space Forces: Air and Space Outstanding Unit Award; Coast Guard "E" Ribbon

The Meritorious Unit Award or MUA is a mid level unit award of the United States Air Force and United States Space Force. Established in 2004, the award recognizes those units who demonstrate exceptionally meritorious conduct in direct support of combat operations. Eligible service is retroactive to 11 September 2001.

== Criteria ==
Approved in March 2004 by the Secretary of the Air Force, the Meritorious Unit Award is awarded in the name of the Secretary to recognize squadrons, groups, or wings for exceptionally meritorious conduct in the performance of outstanding achievement or service in direct support of combat operations for at least 90 continuous days during the period of military operations against an armed enemy of the United States on or after 11 September 2001. The recommended unit must display such outstanding devotion and superior performance of exceptionally difficult tasks as to set it apart and above other units with similar missions. The degree of achievement required is the same as that which would warrant award of the Legion of Merit to an individual. Superior performance of the normal mission alone does not justify award of the MUC. Service in a combat zone is not required, but service must be directly related to the combat effort.

The MUA is worn immediately after the Gallant Unit Citation (GUC) and before the Air and Space Outstanding Unit Award (ASOUA). Additional awards of the MUA are denoted by bronze oak leaf clusters.

The MUA is not awarded to any unit or unit component that was previously awarded the Air and Space Outstanding Unit Award, the Air and Space Organizational Excellence Award (ASOEA), or unit awards from other service components for the same act, achievement, or service. The component commander will automatically consider all disapproved Meritorious Unit Awards for the Air and Space Outstanding Unit Award.
