= United States Air Force Special Reconnaissance =

U.S. Air Force special operations career field

U.S. Air Force Special Reconnaissance
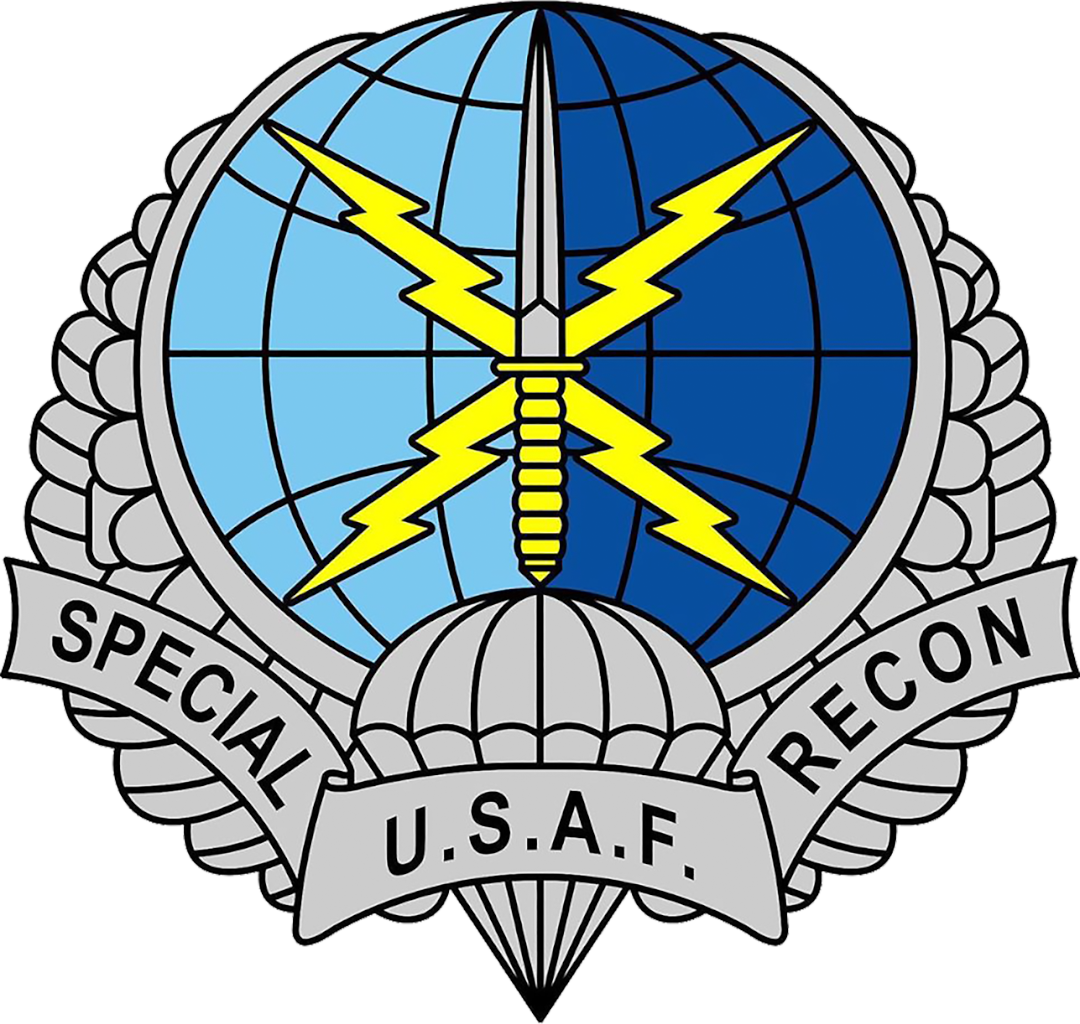
- Special Reconnaissance crest
- Active: Jun 15 1942 – present
- Country: United States of America
- Branch: United States Air Force
- Type: Special operations force
- Role: Special reconnaissance
- Part of: United States Special Operations Command; Air Force Special Operations Command
- Nickname: SR
- Color of Beret: Pewter Grey

Insignia
- Pewter grey beret with badge

Special Reconnaissance (SR), formerly Special Operations Weather Technician or Team (SOWT), is conducted by trained Air Force personnel assigned to Special Tactics Squadrons of the United States Air Force Special Operations Command who operate deep behind enemy lines to conduct covert direction of air and missile attacks, place remotely monitored sensors, and support other special operation units. Like other special operations units, SR units may also carry out direct action (DA) and unconventional warfare (UW), including guerrilla operations. As SOWTs they were tactical observer/forecasters with ground combat capabilities and fell under the Air Force Special Tactics within the Air Force Special Operations Command (AFSOC).

The mission of a Special Operations Weather Technician is to deploy by the most feasible means available into combat and non-permissive environments by collecting and interpreting meteorological data and providing air and ground forces commanders with timely and accurate intelligence. They collect data, assist mission planning, generate accurate and mission-tailored target and route forecasts in support of global special operations, conduct special weather reconnaissance and train foreign national forces. SOWTs provided vital intelligence and deployed with joint air and ground forces in support of direct action, counter-terrorism, foreign internal defense, humanitarian assistance, special reconnaissance, austere airfield, and combat search and rescue.

An article in the May 13, 2019 Air Force Times announced changes to the career field and stated in part:

Special operations weather team airmen, known as SOWTs, are getting a new name and mission.

The SOWT battlefield airman career field was renamed special reconnaissance on 30 April in order to bolster the Air Force Special Tactics teams—which consist of combat control, pararescue and tactical air control party airmen—as they prepare for an era of great power competition.

The new career field and training plan will not be signed and published until the fall, Air Force Special Operations Command officials told Air Force Times Monday. However, the changes in the pipeline will include adding reconnaissance-specific training, military free-fall and combat diver course.

SOWT's new role as special reconnaissance, or SR, will shift from a specialized weather analysis focus to one of multi-domain reconnaissance and surveillance, AFSOC officials said.

== History ==
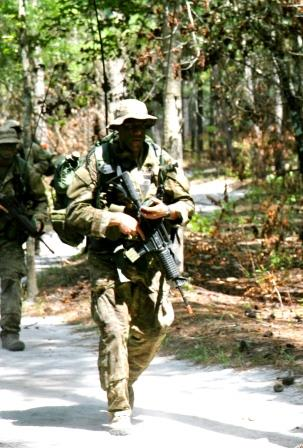
Fort Bragg, North Carolina, SOWT trainee at the Combat Controller School/Special Operations Weather Apprentice Course (CCS/SOWAC) (U.S. Air Force photo).

During World War II, Army Air Forces combat weathermen supported the American effort against the Japanese in the China-Burma-India theater of operations. They also participated in the European theater at Normandy Beach, France; and in the Netherlands and Yugoslavia.

However most of the special operations weather lineage, honors, and heraldry origins of WWII are attributed to the 10th Weather Squadron, at New Delhi, India under the 10th Air Force. The 10th Weather Squadron was constituted 10th Weather on 15 Jun 1942 and activated on 24 Jun 1942 (New Delhi, India). Inactivated on 3 Jul 1946 the 10th Weather Squadron was subsequently activated on 1 June 1948, inactivated on 20 May 1952, activated on 16 Jun 1966, organized on 8 Jul 1966, inactivated on 30 Sep 1975, designated 10th Combat Weather Squadron and activated on 1 Apr 1996, and finally inactivated 7 May 2014. The inactivation of the 10th Combat Weather Squadron resulted in special operations weathermen from the unit being integrated into 720th STG.

The various regional conflicts escalating in Southeast Asia during the years 1961 through 1975 were causal for reactivating the 10th Weather Squadron on 8 July 1966 at Udorn Royal Thai Air Force Base in Thailand, to conduct combat weather operations in Southeast Asia. The 10th subsequently relocated to Long Bình AI, RVN, 3 Aug 1967 and then to Nakhon Phanom, Thailand, 18 February 1974 before being inactivated 30 June 1972. The squadron trained indigenous weather personnel and set up clandestine weather observation networks throughout Southeast Asia. The 10th Weather Squadron played an important part in the raid on the Son Tay POW camp (a.k.a. Operation Ivory Coast) of 1970. The weather forecasting for this mission primarily relied upon images obtained from Defense Meteorological Satellite Program (DMSP) satellites, data obtained by weather aircraft reconnaissance sorties, and extensive climatic analysis data. Weather forecaster Major Keith R. Grimes who as Lt Col became the commander of the 10th during the period from 7 July 1974 to 15 Jul 1975 was weather advisor to the Joint Task Force Commander planning Operation Ivory Coast. It is Major Grimes' extensive work with climatological data and forecasts prepared by Air Weather Service personnel credited by Air Weather Service historians as setting raid's general date.

Previously, during 1963 and 1964, Captain Keith R. Grimes organized the first ad-hoc Air Weather Service Unconventional Warfare Detachment at Hurlburt Field, FL. These, few in-member numbers, special warfare weathermen began deploying to Laos with the primary mission of training friendly forces to take and report weather observation. It was this group of weathermen who worked clandestinely in Laos, under dangerous conditions and on a nearly uninterrupted basis, to establish and maintain weather observing and reporting net essential to combat air operations. Posing as civilians with varying cover stories, and carrying only civilian identification, they functioned not only as weathermen and advisors, but as forward air controllers, intelligence gatherers, and fighters. By 1972 the Air Weather Service had twenty-seven jump qualified combat weather team weathermen. Most were assigned in support of the XVIII Airborne Corps, or the 82nd and 101st Airborne Divisions, but others were assigned with the 7th Weather Squadron in Germany and eight were assigned with the 5th Weather Wing's Detachment 75 at Eglin AFB's Hurlburt Field in support of Air Force and Army Special Forces. From 1972 to about 1985 parachutist qualified combat weather teams and special operations weather teams were considered nonessential. The prevailing senior leadership attitude during this period was expressed by a question AWS chief of staff, Colonel Edwin E. Carmell hypothetically asked in December 1972 of "If you look at it objectively, what kinds of weather [data] do you get out of those guys?" in referring to Detachment 75. "I think the answer is pretty clear," he continued: "they aren't needed."

The decisive origins of Special Operations Weather becoming a unique separate career weather Air Force Specialty Code having a specialty description is the 1 October 1996 reactivation of the 10th Air Weather Squadron as the 10th Combat Weather Squadron (10th CWS) and assigned to the 720th Special Tactics Group (720th STG) of the Air Force Special Operations Command (AFSOC). On 5 May 2008, the Air Force approved the establishment of a new Air Force Specialty Code for Special Operations Weather, formally recognizing their commitment to deploy into restricted environments by air, land or sea to conduct weather operations, observe and analyze all environmental data. The 10th Combat Weather Squadron was inactivated 7 May 2014 with special operations weathermen from the unit being integrated into the Special Tactics Group, Wing and Squadrons.

Special operations weathermen were not included in the failed US embassy hostage rescue attempt in Iran in 1980, known as Operation Eagle Claw. A review group composed of six senior military officials (Admiral James L. Holloway III, United States Navy, Retired; Lieutenant General Samuel V. Wilson, United States Army, Retired; Lieutenant General Leroy J. Manor, United States Air Force Retired; Major General James C. Smith, United States Army; Major General John L. Piotrowski, United States Air Force, and Major General Alfred M. Gray Jr., United States Marine Corps) released a report titled "Rescue Mission Report, August 1980" on Saturday, 23 August 1980. Issue 15 "Weather Reconnaissance" (pp. 40 and 41) of the report discusses the ability of the Joint Task Force's weather team (the AWS team was assigned to the JTP J-2 section) to accurately and reliably forecast Iranian weather, particularly along the 200 nautical mile helicopter route is discussed. The report asserts "in hindsight" that more timely and accurate weather data could and should have been obtained from a WC-130 reconnaissance sortie scouting the route ahead of the helicopters, which would have encountered the dust phenomena before the helicopters and forwarded this info to the helicopters. However immediately following the "hindsight" suggestion is disclosure of the OPSEC risks of such a WC-130 pathfinder reconnaissance, potentially causing mission compromise, was considered to override any advantages gained. Regardless, this working group's assessment for direct weather causals for mission abort and the Desert One tragedy was insufficient and inadequate command and control combined with lack of precise weather abort criteria being determined during mission planning for mission aircrews to rely on in the absence of positive command and control.

Special operations weathermen have directly participated in the majority of modern special operations contingency operations since Operation Urgent Fury, the U.S. invasion of Grenada working with other special operations and conventional forces. These recent successes include operations Just Cause in Panama, Desert Shield/Desert Storm, Task Force Ranger operations in Somalia, Uphold Democracy in Haiti, operations in Bosnia and counter narcotics operations in South America, as well as ongoing operations in support of Enduring Freedom and Iraqi Freedom.

- 15 May 1942: Parachute School is established at Fort Benning, Georgia. It is a three-week course students attend en route to their duty assignment.
- 24 June 1942: Combat weathermen support the American effort against the Japanese in the China-Burma-India theater of operations.
- June 1944: Combat weathermen see action during World War II at Normandy Beach, France; and, in the Netherlands and Yugoslavia.
- 16 June 1966: The inactivated (20 May 1952) 10th Weather Squadron is reactivated. It is reconstituted and assigned on 8 July 1966 at Udon Airfield, Thailand to conduct combat weather operations in Southeast Asia. The squadron is responsible for training indigenous weather personnel and setting up the clandestine weather observation networks throughout Southeast Asia.
- November 1971: Timing for the Son Tay Raid was based on the three-day forecast. However much of the preliminary weather planning deciding when to best make the raid was accomplished in the United States by Major, subsequently Lt Col, Keith R. Grimes on a temporary duty assignment basis from May 1970 until January 1971. During this period he was a faculty member of the Air Command and Staff College. He arrived in Southeast Asia at Tan Son Nhut on 10 November 1970. He subsequently personally selected and obtained two 1st Weather Group weather forecasters (Senior Master Sergeant Van Houdt and Master Sergeant Ralston) to perform the mission forecasting. The weather forecasting for the actual raid mostly relied on weather satellite data and data from numerous aerial weather reconnaissance sorties that were flown daily, including the day of the raid. The weather support personnel successfully used data from weather satellites (DMSP products) and data from aircraft weather reconnaissance sorties to forecast the only 12 hours of "go" conditions during a 38-day period.

== Status in the 21st century ==
The Air Force refers to all its ground element as Battlefield Airmen (BA). This designation includes both the Special Operations career fields of AFSOC – Pararescue (PJ), Combat Control (CCT), Special Reconnaissance (SR), and Tactical Air Control Party (TACP) – but also other career fields that often train and support AFSOC elements. The latter include the Explosive Ordnance Disposal (EOD), Survival Evasion Resistance Escape (SERE), Security Forces (SF), and Special Missions Aviation (SMA) career fields. However, a major overhaul of the SOF career fields is underway.

== Initial pipeline ==
SR selection and training has among the highest attrition rate in US SOF, hovering around 93%.

Following are the initial training courses that the candidates will have to make it through to become a Special Reconnaissance operator shown in a chronological order:

- USAF Basic Military Training (BMT), Lackland Air Force Base, Texas (7.5 weeks). The first course in the Air Force for all non-prior service enlisted personnel. This is where candidates will learn how to be an Airman, and the basics of the USAF. Special Warfare candidates will meet with cadre every week to perform preprogrammed exercises in an effort to optimize their performance for the pipeline. SW candidates will make their first impressions on the instructors as well as on their future teammates.
- Special Warfare Preparatory Course (SW PREP), Lackland Air Force Base, Texas (8 weeks). SW Prep is designed to give the candidates the best possible chance of getting through the selection. Collegiate level strength/conditioning coaches, running coaches, swimming coaches, nutritionists, physical therapists, among other specialties use their combined expertise to maximize the candidates' level of fitness and prepare them for the rigors of selection, both mentally and physically. Candidates will be exposed to sleep deprivation, extended training days, and the importance of performing as a team.
- Special Warfare Assessment and Selection (SW A&S), Lackland Air Force Base, Texas (4 weeks). Entire length of the A&S, candidates will be thoroughly evaluated by both the psychologists and cadre in extremely demanding scenarios. A&S is divided into two segments: Field Phase and Selection Phase. In Field Phase (2.5 weeks) candidates can expect to be in a field-like setting, sleeping in makeshift lodging in cots with sleeping bags. Training is continuous with zero down days, often experiencing continuous sleep deprivation. Training consists of surface swimming, water confidence, Grass & Guerilla drills, running, rucking, calisthenics, Team events and extended training days (ETD). Selection Phase (1.5 weeks): Following the field phase, candidates will begin clean up of the facilities and will be administered academic and psychological tests, surveys, critiques and interviews. Instructors will compile all relevant information and select only those candidates that meet the desired career field attributes.
- Special Warfare Pre-Dive (SW Pre-Dive): This course is designed to prepare the candidates for Special Warfare Combat Dive school. Candidates will be subjected to more technical and difficult water confidence training. As of mid 2019, this course eliminated up to 30% of the A&S graduates. Lackland Air Force Base, Texas (4 weeks).
- U.S. Army Airborne School, Fort Benning, Georgia (3 weeks). Airborne school teaches basic parachuting skills required to infiltrate an objective area by static line airdrop. This course includes ground operations week, tower week, and jump week where students will make five parachute jumps. Candidates will be awarded the basic parachutist rating upon graduation.
- Military Freefall School, Yuma Proving Ground, Arizona (4 weeks). Week one of the four-week course focuses on vertical wind tunnel body stabilization training, parachute packing, and an introduction to military freefall operations. The remaining weeks focuses training on varying jump profiles using three airborne operations per training iteration, totaling 30 military freefall operations (HALO/HAHO) per course encompassing various conditions and equipment loads. Upon graduation of the course, students are awarded the Military Freefall Parachutist Badge.
- USAF SERE (Survival, Evasion, Resistance and Escape) School, Fairchild Air Force Base, Washington (3 weeks). Students will spend extended time out in the field learning navigation and survival techniques. These survival techniques include food/water procurement, shelter and bivouac selection/construction, map and compass techniques, and emergency signaling/radio procedures. Additionally, students will learn how to properly respond during a myriad of interrogation techniques and how to resist in the event that they are captured by the enemy.
- Underwater Egress, Fairchild Air Force Base, Washington (2 days). During this training students will learn how to escape a submerged and rotated helicopter utilizing an environment tank which can simulate the experience of being submerged in a real world open ocean scenario.
- Special Reconnaissance Apprentice Course, (6 months). During the Special Reconnaissance Apprentice course, candidates will gain experience in reconnaissance, surveillance, long-range precision engagement and target interdiction, and combat enabling tasks. Other skills will include demolition, communication and signalling, human intelligence gathering, operational preparation of the environment and tactical cyber applications. Upon graduation, candidates will be awarded the SR beret and crest and the 3 level AFSC rating.
- Special Tactics Advanced Skills Training, Hurlburt Field, Florida (6–12 months). This training typically lasts between six months and one year. 3 level SR operators will undergo comprehensive and advanced training on weapons, demolition training, advanced surveillance and reconnaissance – to include multi-domain electronic warfare, small unmanned aircraft systems, long-range marksmanship, all-terrain vehicles, maritime operations, and alternate infiltration/exfiltration tactics, techniques, and procedures. Upon graduation, 3 level SR operators are awarded the 5 level AFSC rating and are world-wide deployable.

== Mission ==
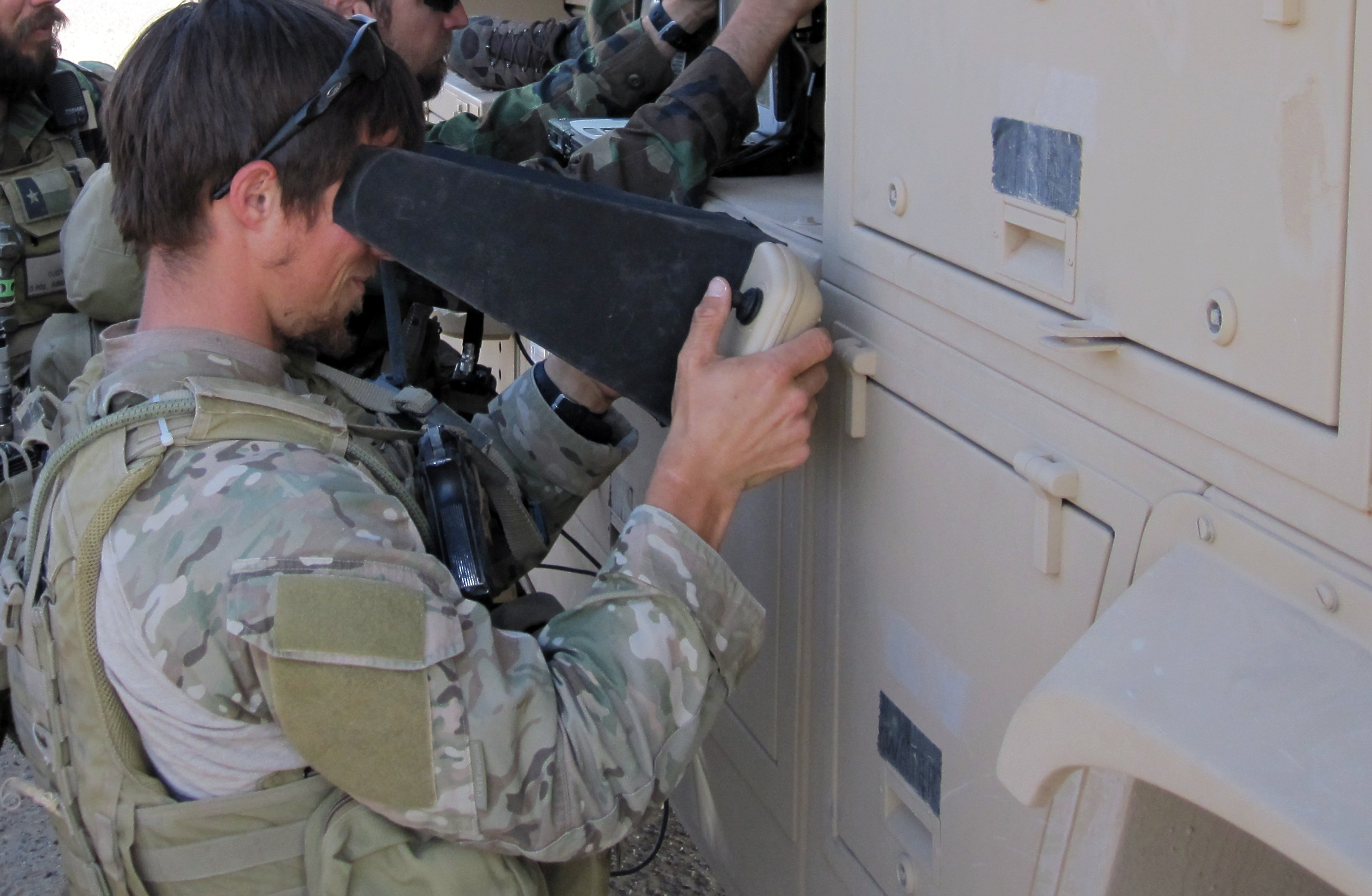
A Special Operations Weather Team Specialist pilots an RQ-11B unmanned aerial vehicle in Afghanistan.

Special Operations Weathermen were U.S. Air Force meteorologists with unique training to operate in hostile or denied territory. They gathered, assessed, and interpreted weather and environmental intelligence from forward deployed locations, working primarily with Air Force and Army Special Operations Forces. SOWT's could also have been attached to Marine MARSOC and Navy SEAL teams, to collect weather, ocean, river, snow and terrain intelligence, assist mission planning, generate accurate mission-tailored target and route forecasts in support of global special operations and train joint force members and coalition partners to take and communicate limited weather observations.

They operated on 2-3-man Environmental Reconnaissance Teams (ERT). ERT's which were attached to 8-9-man Special Tactics Teams (STT) alongside Combat Control (CCT) and Pararescue (PJ) personnel. Together they provide SOCOM a unique capability to establish and control austere airfields in permissive and non-permissive environments. Additionally, Special Operations Weathermen conducted special reconnaissance, fly small Unmanned aerial systems (SUAS), collected upper air data, organized, established and maintained weather data reporting networks, determined host nation meteorological capabilities and trained foreign national forces.

The mission of their successor, Special Reconnaissance, other than multi-domain reconnaissance and surveillance, is not yet publicly available.

== Formations and units ==
=== Air Force Special Operations Command (AFSOC) ===
- 21 STS, Pope Army Airfield, Fort Bragg, NC
- 22 STS, Joint Base Lewis - McChord, WA
- 23 STS, Hurlburt Field, FL
- 24 STS Pope Army Airfield, Fort Bragg, NC
- 321 STS, RAF Mildenhall, UK
- 320 STS, Kadena AB, Japan

=== Air National Guard (ANG) ===
- 123d Special Tactics Sq, Louisville, KY
- 125th Special Tactics Sq, Portland, OR

== See also ==
- List of United States Air Force special tactics squadrons
- United States Special Operations Forces

=== Similar foreign units ===
- Special Reconnaissance Regiment—United Kingdom
- 13th Parachute Dragoon Regiment—France
