= United States Air Force Combat Rescue Officer =

US Air Force officer specializing in combat search and rescue

U.S. Air Force Combat Rescue Officer
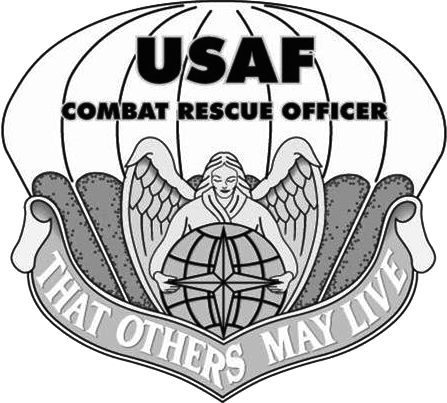
- Combat Rescue Officer beret flash
- Active: December 2000 – present
- Country: United States of America
- Branch: United States Air Force
- Type: Special Operations Force
- Role: Combat search and rescue
- Part of: United States Special Operations Command; Air Force Special Operations Command or Air Combat Command (Unit dependent)
- Nicknames: CRO, Air Commando
- Motto: "That Others May Live"
- Color of Beret: Maroon

Insignia
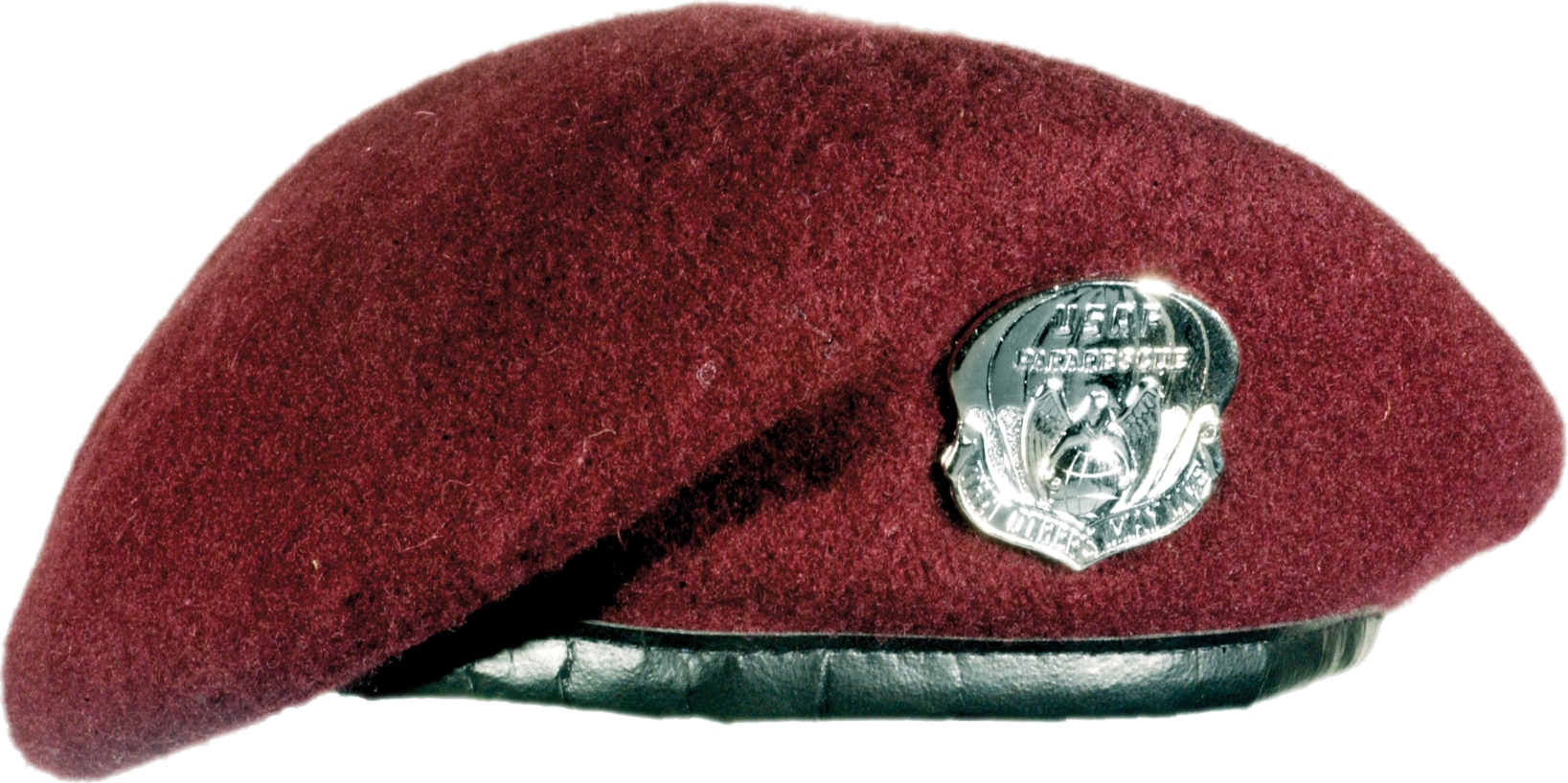
- Maroon beret worn by Combat Rescue Officers and Pararescuemen alike

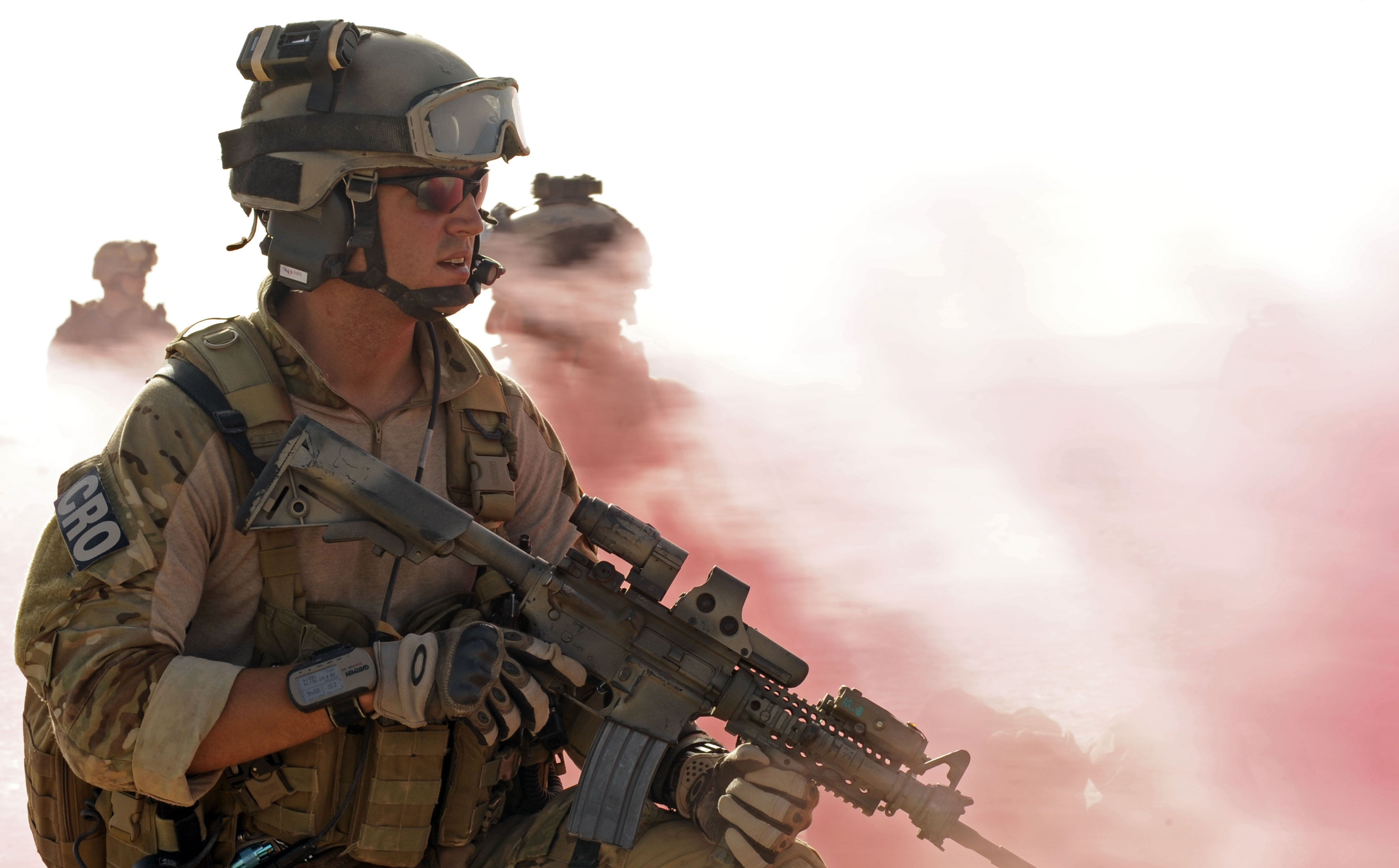
A Combat Rescue Officer during a mass casualty exercise at Camp Lemonier, Djibouti

Combat Rescue Officer (CRO) is a Special Warfare Officer career field in the United States Air Force. Its Air Force Specialty Code (AFSC) is 19ZXC and it was created to strengthen USAF Special Warfare personnel recovery capabilities by providing commissioned officer leadership that possessed an operational skillset paralleling that of the enlisted pararescuemen (PJ). The CRO specialty includes direct combatant command and control of Combat Search and Rescue (CSAR) operations. They plan, manage and execute the six tasks of CSAR: prepare, report, locate, support, recover, and reintegrate isolated personnel and materiel. CROs conduct strategic, operational and tactical level planning, provide battle staff expertise, manage theater personnel recovery operations, and conduct combat special operations.

== History ==
The CRO specialty was created on 8 December 2000. In 2001, the first three Combat Rescue Officers were assigned, including Col. (as of 2010) Vincent Savino, first commander of the 38th Rescue Squadron, activated that year.

== Overview ==
CROs command day-to-day activities to organize, train and equip assigned personnel to conduct Personnel Recovery operations. They deploy as a direct combatant commander of operations. CROs provide subject matter expertise to command battle staffs and theater command and control structure.

CRO duties and responsibilities include:

- Planning missions and leading CSAR assets, pararescue and Survival, Evasion, Resistance and Escape operations, including aerospace interface in the recovery objective area
- Supporting joint and combined forces engaged in conventional and special operations air, ground, and/or maritime personnel recovery operations
- Advising on readiness of forces based on force status reports, inspections, training exercise and evaluation results
- Developing plans and coordinating activities to report, locate and support isolated personnel or materiel
- Planning and conducting missions to recover personnel and materiel, coordinating evacuation of isolated personnel to friendly control
- Developing plans and executing the debriefing and reintegration of recovered personnel
- Ensuring CSAR activities are organized, and teams/units are trained and equipped to perform the full military spectrum of CSAR and Coalition/Joint PR
- Inspecting and evaluating CSAR activities, functions, and personnel

== Training and selection process ==
The selection process is broken into two phases. Phase I requires an in depth application that summarizes the professional history and qualifications of the individual applying. Heavy consideration is given to prior military service, academic achievement, and leadership abilities. A board of field grade officers review the applications and select the group that will go on to Phase II of selection.

Phase II takes place at Fairchild Air Force Base, Washington. This phase includes three mile running sessions, 1,500 meter swims, and rucksack marches up to six miles. The goal of Phase II is to place the candidates under extreme fatigue and constant stress to see how they think and act under circumstances that are similar to the real world battlefront. Many young officers going into Phase II drop out or are eliminated, leaving a fraction of the original class.

CRO training consists of the following:

- Combat Rescue Officer (CRO) / Pararescue (PJ) Indoctrination Course, Lackland Air Force Base, Texas (9 weeks)

The mission of the Indoctrination Course is to select and train future CRO and PJs. At this school, participants undergo extensive physical conditioning with swimming, running, functional weight training and calisthenics. This course helps prepare students for the rigors of training and the demands of these lifestyles. Other training includes water confidence training, obstacle courses, rucksack marches, and academics to prepare the candidates for follow-on training courses (e.g. diving physics/dive tables). Graduation of this course allows the individual to begin learning the special skills that make CROs and PJs highly regarded rescue operators throughout the joint community.

- Army Airborne School, Fort Benning, Georgia (3 weeks)

Students learn the basic parachuting skills required to infiltrate an objective area by static line airdrop. This course includes ground operations week, tower week, and "jump week" when participants make five parachute jumps. Personnel who complete this training are awarded the basic parachutist rating and are allowed to wear the Parachutist Badge.

- Air Force Combat Diver School, Navy Diving and Salvage Training Center, Naval Support Activity Panama City, Florida (5.5 weeks)

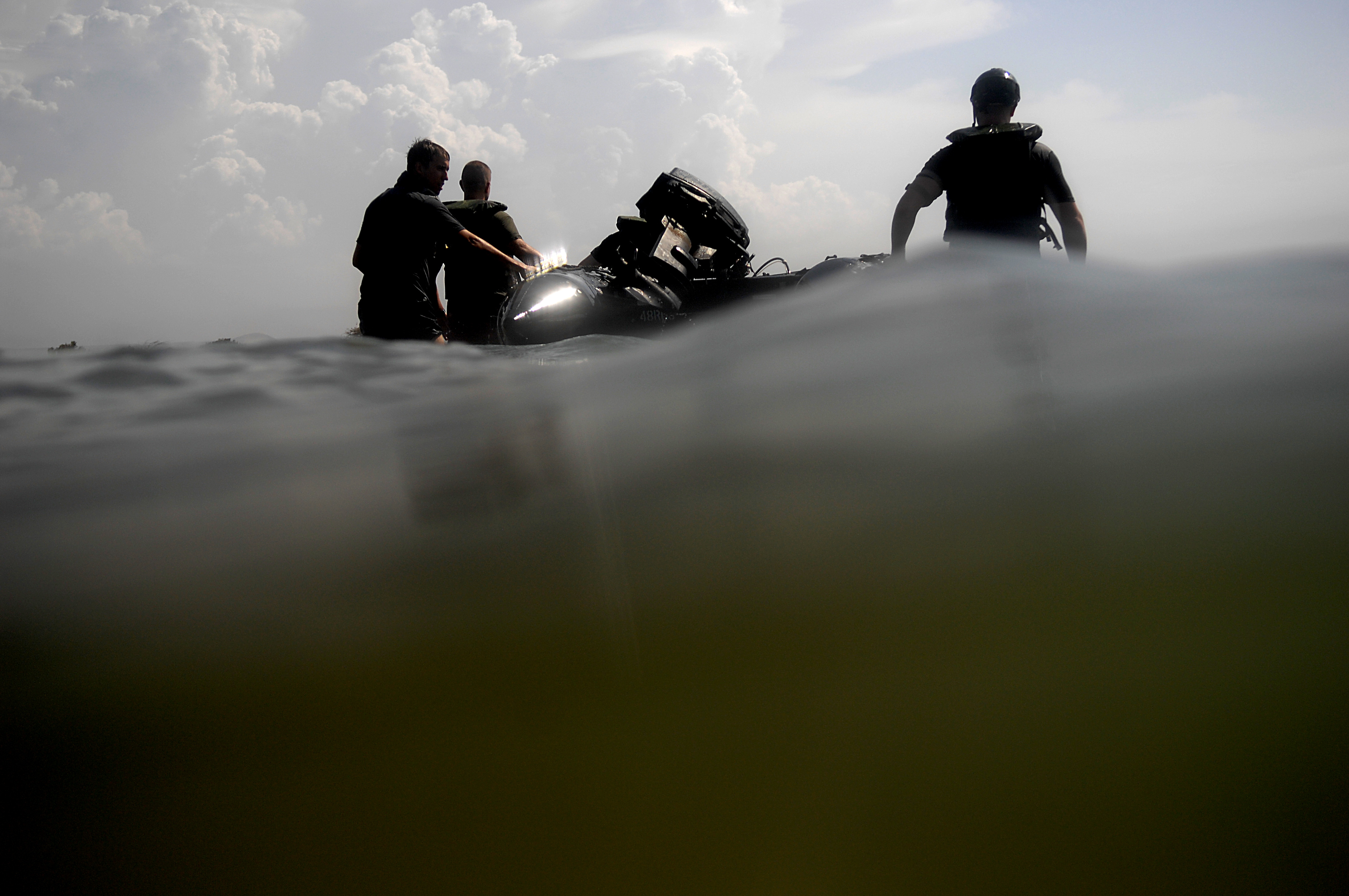
U.S. Air Force Rescue Operators (CRO/PJ) inserted via USMC CH-53E Super Stallion helicopter.

The course is divided into four blocks of instruction: (1) Diving Theory, (2) Infiltration/Exfiltration Methods, (3) Open Circuit Diving Operations, and (4) Closed Circuit Diving Operations. The primary focus of AFCDC is to develop Pararescuemen/Combat Rescue Officers and Combat Controller/Special Tactics Officers into competent, capable and safe combat divers/swimmers. The course provides commanders with divers/swimmers capable of undertaking personnel recovery and special operations waterborne missions. AFCDC provides diver training through classroom instruction, extensive physical training, surface and sub-surface water confidence pool exercises, pool familiarization dives, day/night tactical open water surface/sub-surface infiltration swims, open/closed circuit diving procedures and underwater search and recovery procedures. The session culminates with a waterborne field training exercise.

- Navy Underwater Egress Training, Naval Air Station Pensacola, Florida (1 day)

This course teaches how to safely escape from an aircraft that has landed in the water. Instruction includes principles, procedures and techniques necessary to escape a sinking aircraft.

- Air Force Basic Survival School, Fairchild Air Force Base, Washington (2.5 weeks)

This course teaches basic survival techniques for remote areas using minimal equipment. This includes instruction of principles, procedures, equipment and techniques that help individuals to survive, regardless of climatic conditions or unfriendly environments, and return home.

- Army Military Free Fall Parachutist School, Yuma Proving Ground, Arizona (4 weeks)

This course instructs free fall parachuting (HALO) using a high performance parafoil. The course provides wind tunnel training, in-air instruction focusing on student stability, aerial maneuvers, air sense and parachute opening procedures. Each student receives a minimum of 30 free fall jumps including two day and two night jumps with supplemental oxygen, rucksack and load-bearing equipment.

- Advanced Survival, Evasion, Resistance and Escape (SERE) course, Fairchild Air Force Base, Washington (4 weeks)

This course teaches advanced SERE skills associated with the tactical PR planning for report, locate, support, recovery and reintegration tasks of the personnel recovery mission. Additionally, this course provides the CRO with knowledge in Joint Personnel Recovery program management and the AF SERE activities.

- Air Force Combat Rescue Officer Entry Level Course, Kirtland Air Force Base, New Mexico (17 weeks)

Initial qualification course to instruct the CRO candidate on Ground Force Commander competencies to include terminal area operations and tactical employment of rescue forces. The CRO candidate is evaluated on his ability to command and control ground and aviation support assets during dynamic rescue and recovery operations.

- Ground skills include: leadership, weapons, small unit tactics, ground mobility, communications, technical rescue, and other field craft skills.

- Employment skills include: fast rope, rope ladder, hoist, rappelling, amphibious operations (surface & subsurface), precision aerial operations (static-line and military free-fall parachuting).

CRO candidates graduate as non-rated officer aircrew on HH-60 and HC-130 aircraft. Application includes academics, practical training, testing, and evaluation in academics and field environments, flying training, and flight aircraft.

- Introduction to Personnel Recovery (PR 101), Fort Belvoir, Virginia (3 days)

PR 101 is conducted by the Joint Personnel Recovery Agency (JPRA) and is an introduction to the DoD Personnel Recovery system.

- Joint Aerospace Command and Control Course, Hurlburt Field, Florida (3 weeks)

Teaches the application of joint air operations.

== See also ==
- List of United States Air Force rescue squadrons
- List of United States Air Force special tactics squadrons
- United States Air Force Pararescue
