= Ramón Colón-López =

4th Senior Enlisted Advisor to the Chairman

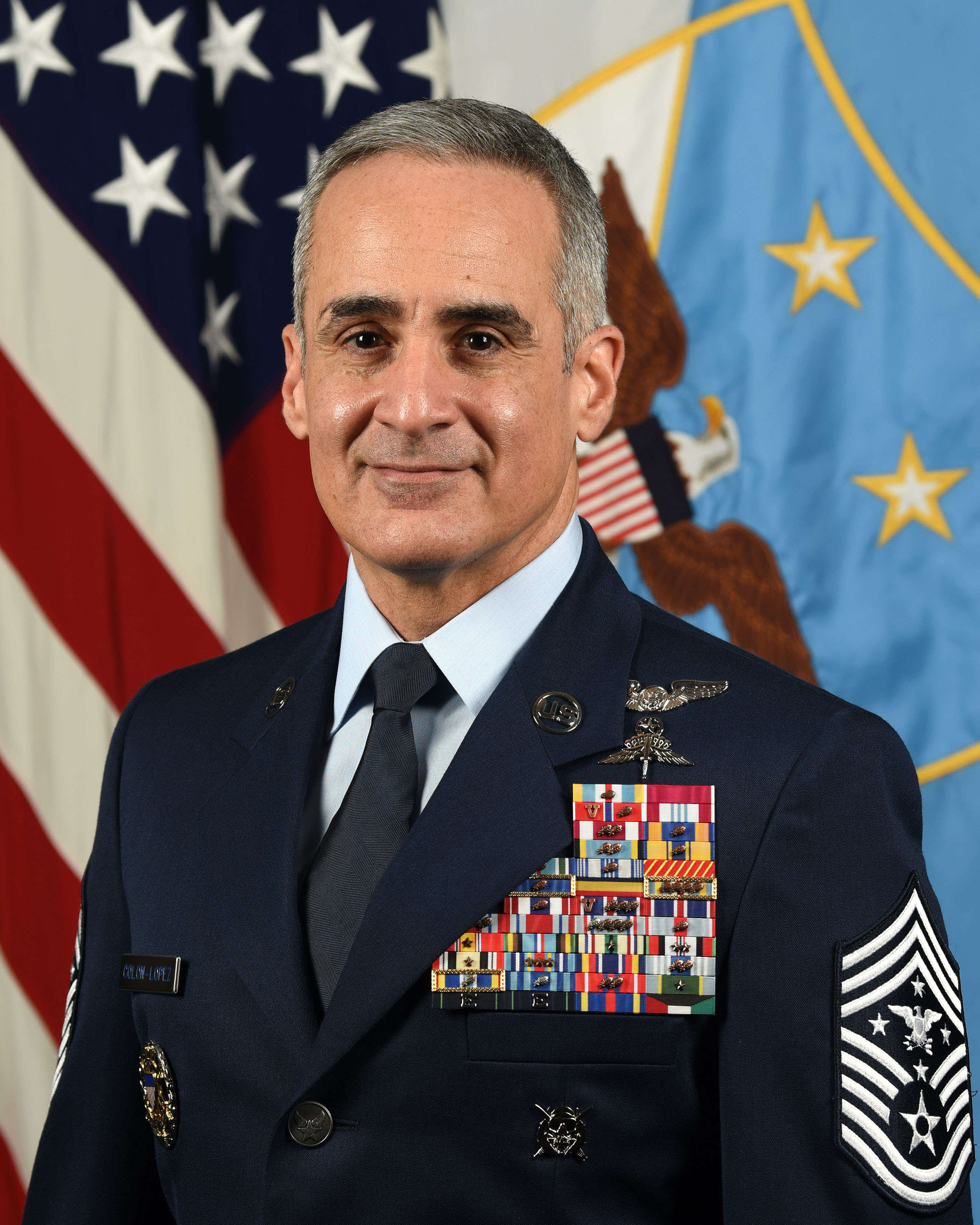
- SEAC Colón-López in December 2019
- Born: October 21, 1971 (age 55); Ponce, Puerto Rico
- Military career
- Allegiance: United States
- Branch: United States Air Force
- Service years: 1990–2023
- Rank: Senior Enlisted Advisor to the Chairman
- Nicknames: "Chief C-Z" "C-Lo"
- Unit: 24th Special Tactics Squadron 48th Rescue Squadron
- Conflicts: Gulf War; Iraqi no-fly zones conflict; Operation Southern Watch; Operation Northern Watch; War in Afghanistan; Iraq War
- Awards: Defense Distinguished Service Medal (2); Defense Superior Service Medal (2); Legion of Merit; Bronze Star Medal (2)

Ramón Colón-López (born October 21, 1971) is a retired senior non-commissioned officer of the United States Air Force and a former pararescueman, and served as the 4th Senior Enlisted Advisor to the Chairman (SEAC) from December 13, 2019 to November 3, 2023. In his role as SEAC, Colón-López was the most senior enlisted member of the United States military. In 2007 he was the only Hispanic American among the first six airmen to be awarded the newly created Air Force Combat Action Medal. He served as the Senior Enlisted Leader of United States Africa Command from September 2016 to November 2019.

== Early life and family ==
Colón-López was born to Vilma López and Ramon Colon-Torres in the city of Ponce, Puerto Rico, located in the southern coast of the island. His family moved to Bridgeport, Connecticut and in 1989, he graduated from Kolbe Cathedral High School. Colón-López wanted to pursue a degree in the field of biology and attended Sacred Heart University. However, after two semesters, on 10 December 1990, he enlisted in the United States Air Force and trained as a Transportation Specialist.

== Military career ==
After graduating basic military training as a Transportation Specialist at Lackland Air Force Base, Texas, Colón-López was stationed at Iraklion Air Station in Crete. He was deployed during the Gulf War. In 1994, he volunteered for Pararescue duty training and completed his training in 1996 with 12 of his original 113 PJ candidates. After completing the PJ "pipeline" he was assigned to the 48th Rescue Squadron out of Holloman Air Force Base, New Mexico. While a member of the 48th RQS he participated in various assignments, among which were Operation Southern Watch and Operation Northern Watch as Combat Search and Rescue Team Leader. He left the 48th RQS in January 1999 to join the 24th Special Tactics Squadron, located at Pope Air Force Base, North Carolina.

=== 24th Special Tactics Squadron ===
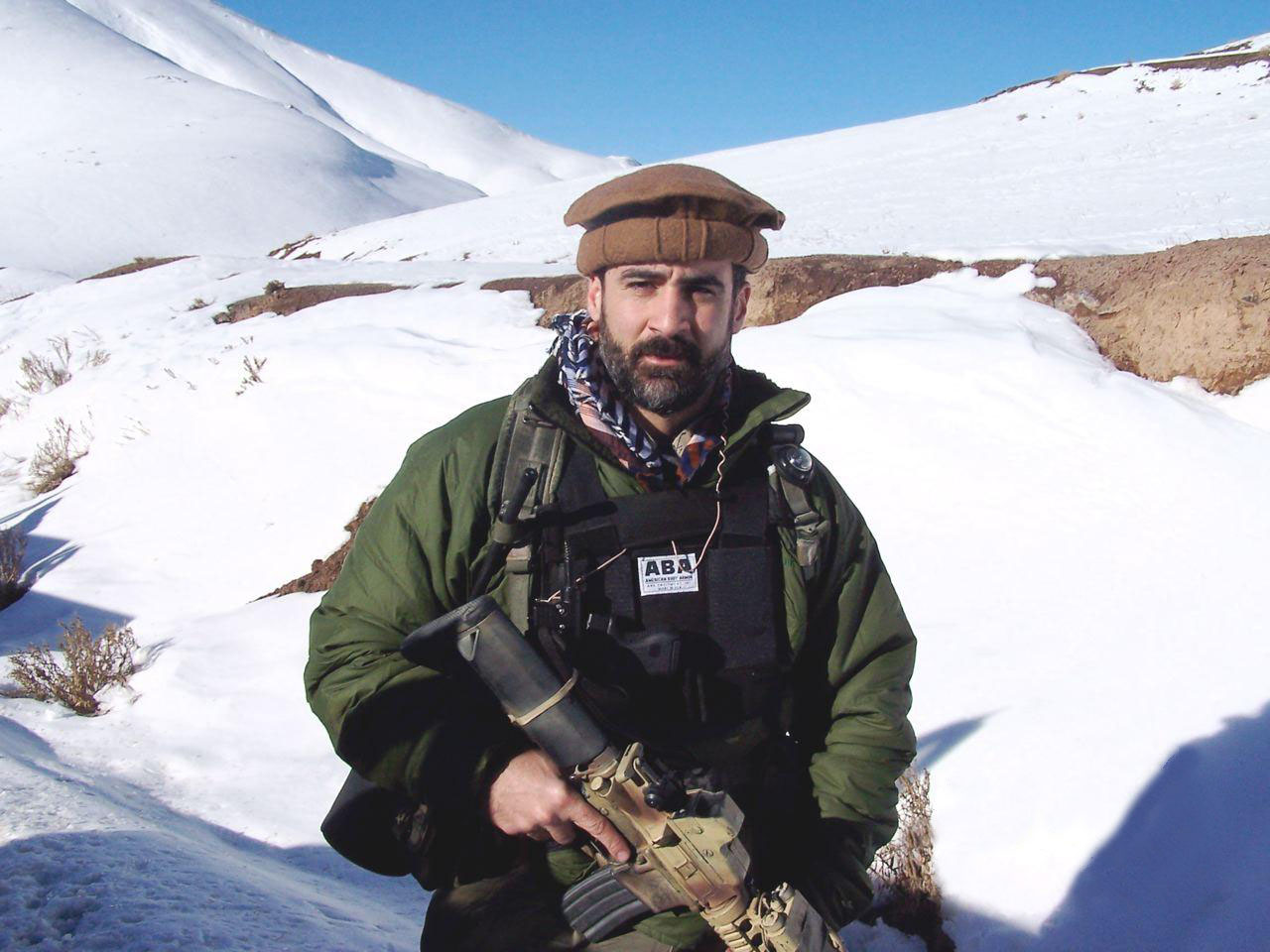
Colón-López in Afghanistan in 2004.

From 1999 to 2005 Colón-López was a member of the 24th Special Tactics Squadron as a Special Tactics Element Leader. While a member of the 24th STS, from July 2002 to September 2004, Colón-López was deployed four times to Afghanistan as part of a joint task force to several classified locations in support of Operation Enduring Freedom. While deployed he participated in a series of joint operations, including direct assaults and combat search and rescue missions. During this time he also protected future Afghanistan president, Hamid Karzai, and received his first Bronze Star Medal with valor for his actions under fire while supporting Karzai's security detail. His second Bronze Star Medal was for his actions after his helicopter was shot down during a mission in Afghanistan. After the helicopter crash landed, two Navy SEALs and Colón-López assaulted fortified enemy positions, killing five combatants and ensuring the safety of the remaining crew. He was selected to create and implement the unit's compartmented Personnel Recovery Advance Force Operations team, which serviced the entire Joint Special Operations arena.

On March 11, 2004, Colón-López, together with his Advance Force Operations Team and elements of the Afghan National Strike Unit, participated in an operation which required the capture of a high level target and a follow-on site exploitation with the intention of preventing the proliferation of chemical weapons. His helicopter drew hostile enemy fire yet Colón-López continued on his mission, which resulted in two enemy kills, the capture of 10 enemy troops and the destruction of multiple rocket propelled grenades and small caliber weapons. In January 2005, after Colón-López returned to the United States, he was named Superintendent of Training and later as interim Commandant of the Pararescue and Combat Rescue Officer School.

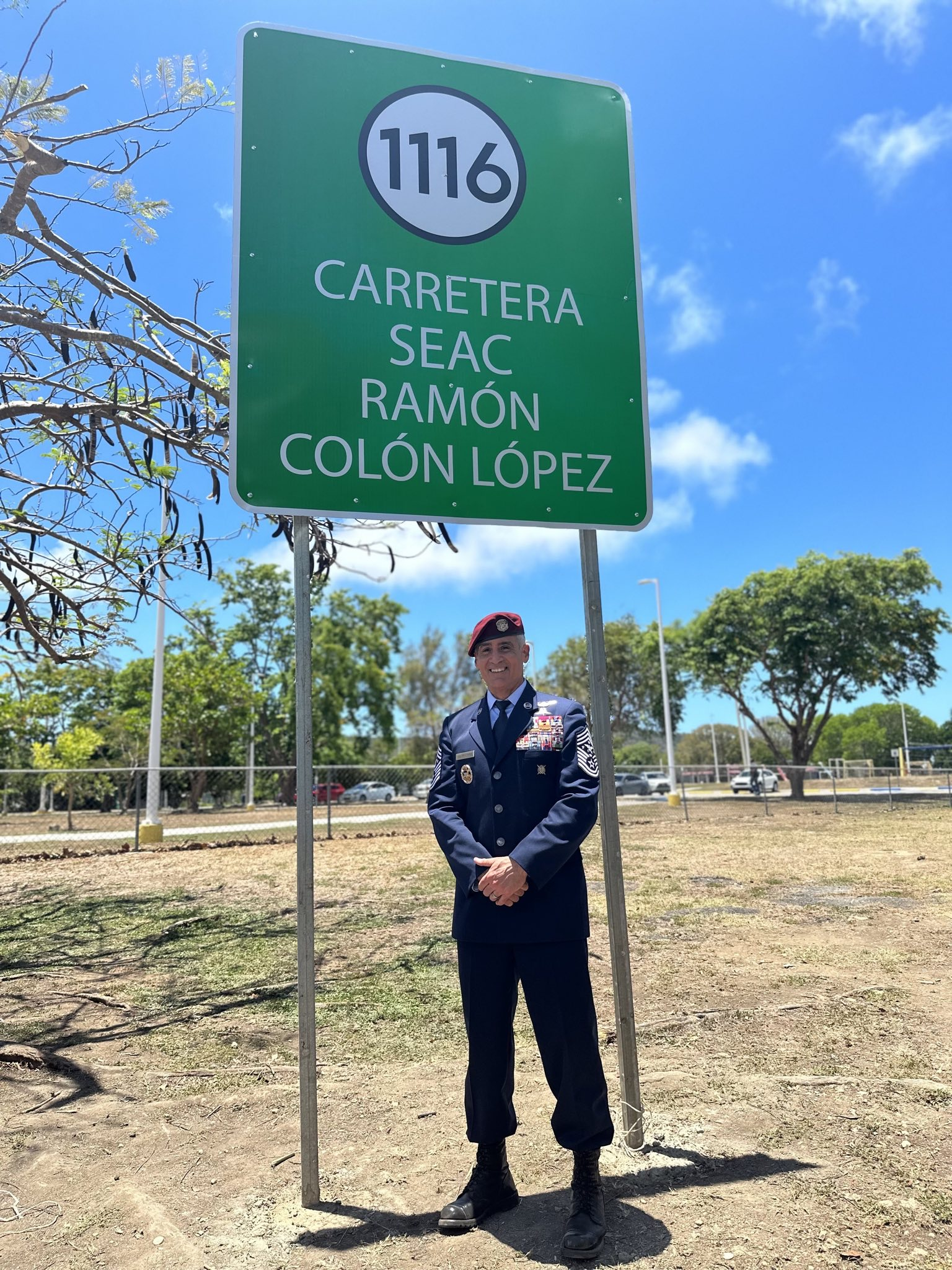
HWY1116, Carretera SEAC Ramon Colon-Lopez in Guanica, Puerto Rico.

=== Later career ===
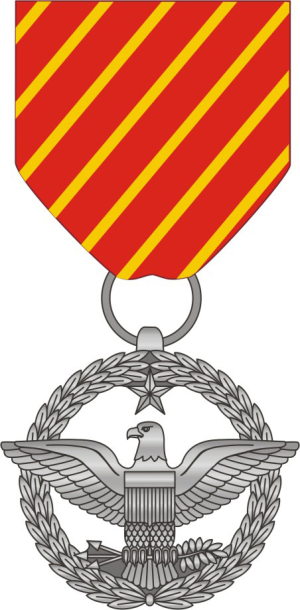
Air Force Combat Action Medal

On June 13, 2007, Colón-López became the first Hispanic, and one of the first six airmen, to be awarded the newly created Air Force Combat Action Medal. It was bestowed upon him by Air Force Chief of Staff General T. Michael Moseley at the Air Force Memorial, in Washington, D.C. The medal was created to recognize Air Force members who are engaged in air or ground combat "outside the wire" in combat zones. Airmen who are under direct and hostile fire, or who personally engaged hostile forces with direct and lethal fire are eligible to receive the award. The other five airmen to receive the award were Major Steve Raspet; Master Sergeant Byron P. Allen; Master Sergeant Charlie Peterson; Staff Sergeant Daniel Paxton; and Captain Allison K. Black.

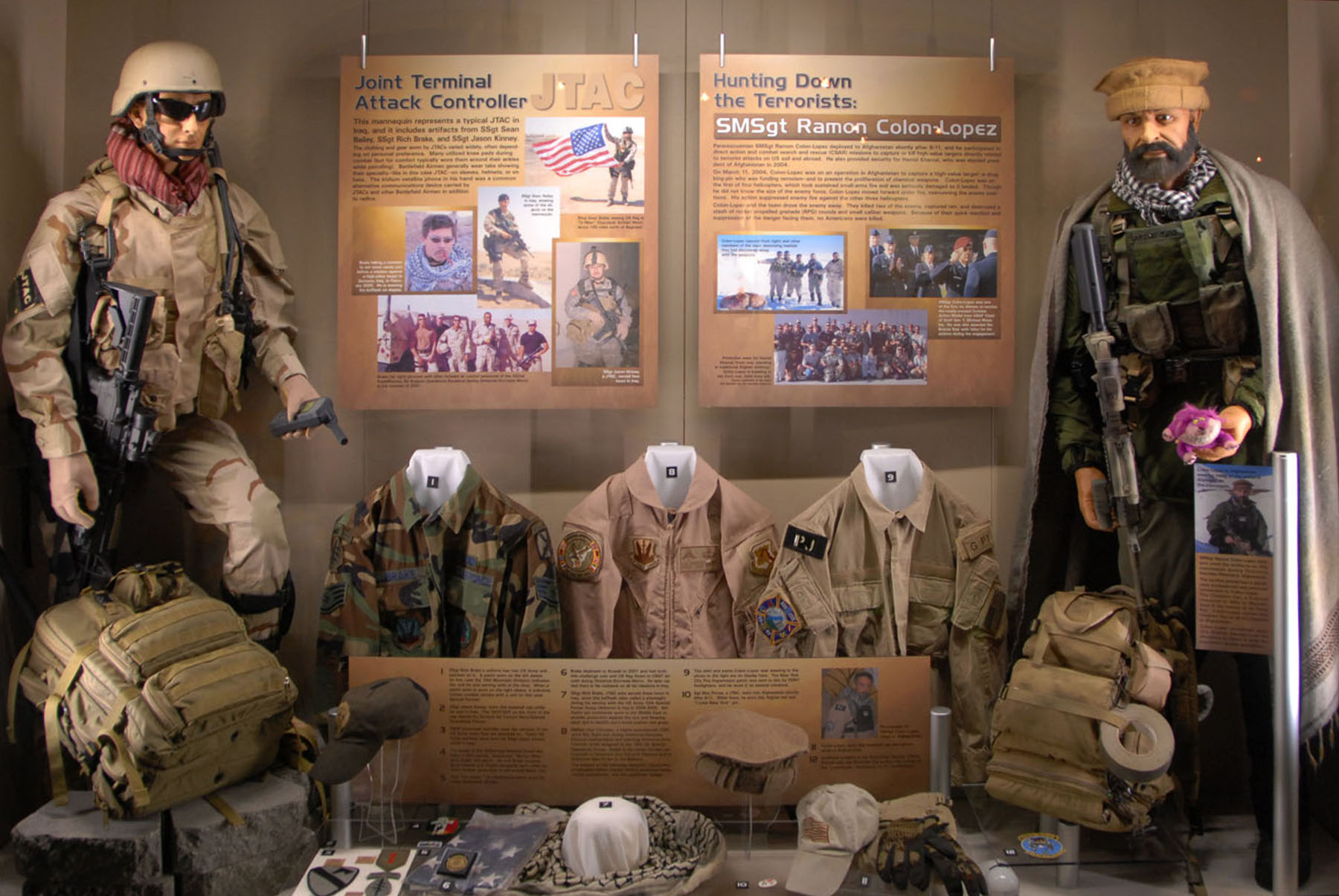
The "Warrior Airmen" exhibit at the U.S. Air Force Museum with a mannequin of Colón-López on the right

After leaving the PJ/CRO Schoolhouse Colón-López returned to Pope Field and the 24th Special Tactics Squadron as the unit's Senior Enlisted Advisor from April 2009 to April 2011. As of 2009 a mannequin of Colón-López is featured at the United States Air Force Museum located in Dayton, Ohio, in the museum's "Warrior Airmen" exhibit.

After serving as the SEA for the 24th STS for two years, Colón-López then served as the inaugural Group Superintendent of the 724th Special Tactics Group at Pope Field, which was activated on 30 April 2011. However, he only held the position for six months before becoming the Command Chief Master Sergeant of the 1st Special Operations Wing at Hurlburt Field on November 30, 2011. In January 2013 Colón-López was reassigned to the 18th Wing at Kadena AB, Japan where he served as the wing's Command Chief. In addition to his traditional duties as a wing's Command Chief he also served as Kadena Air Base's senior enlisted liaison between the 18th Wing and enlisted personnel from other Department of Defense branches on Okinawa.

In 2013 the Air Force Professional Development Guide (PDG) featured an excerpt regarding Colón-López added in the "Enlisted Heritage" chapter, in which it refers to his actions in Afghanistan that led to him receiving the Air Force Combat Action Medal. The PDG is studied by airmen for the Promotion Fitness Examination portion of the Weighted Airman Promotion System which overall determines promotions to the ranks of Staff Sergeant (E-5) through Technical Sergeant (E-6) Air Force-wide.

In June 2014, Colon-Lopez was selected to replace Chief Master Sergeant Shelina Frey as the command chief for United States Air Forces Central Command.

In May 2022, Colon-Lopez received an honorary rank of master chief by the Master Chief Petty Officer of the Coast Guard, MCPOCG Heath B. Jones.

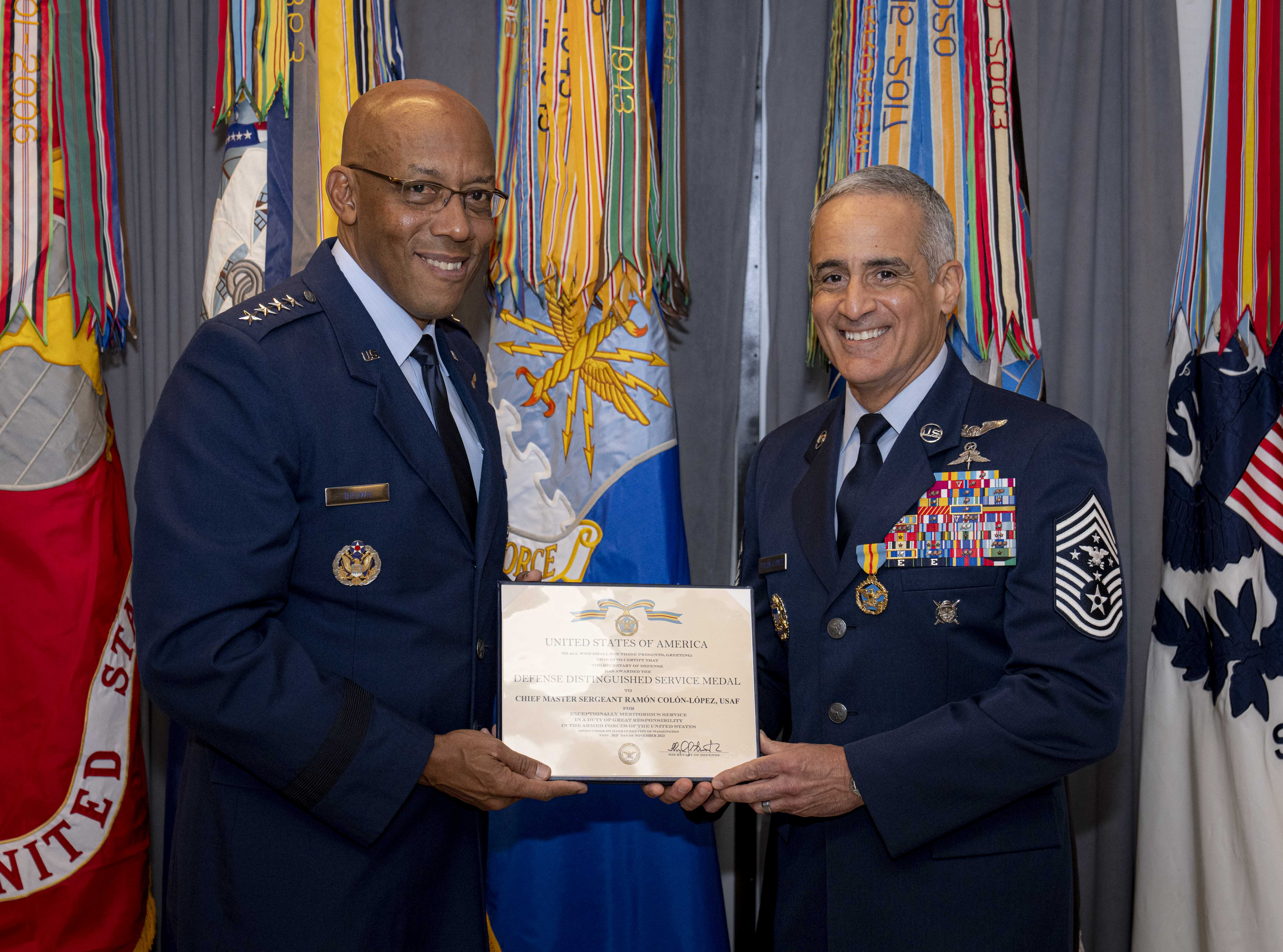
SEAC Colon-Lopez is awarded the DDSM by CJCS General CQ Brown

In 2023, he was honored in his hometown of Guánica, Puerto Rico with a road named after him as "Carretera SEAC Ramon Colon Lopez" on HWY 1116, and on October 24, 2023, he was the inaugural recipient of the Euripides Rubio Medal, presented by the Commonwealth of Puerto Rico for an accomplished military career with significant valorous combat actions and honor. As the SEAC, Colon-Lopez became the first enlisted member of the United States Armed Forces to be awarded the Defense Distinguished Service Medal for outstanding contributions to national security in a position of great responsibility. The Defense Distinguished Service Medal is the United States Department of Defense's highest non-combat related military award and it is the highest joint service decoration.

== Education ==
- 1991 USAF Traffic Management School, Sheppard AFB, TX
- 1994 USAF Pararescue Selection Course (OL-H), Lackland AFB, TX
- 1995 Special Forces Underwater Operations (SFUWO) Combat Diver Course, NAS Key West, FL
- 1996 Pararescue Apprentice Course, Kirtland AFB, NM
- 1997 Airman Leadership School, Holloman AFB, NM
- 2000 SFUWO Dive Medical Technician Course, NAS Key West, FL
- 2001 Airborne Jumpmaster Course, Little Creek NAS, VA
- 2003 Military Freefall Jumpmaster Course, Yuma PG, AZ
- 2003 Noncommissioned Officer Academy, Maxwell-Gunter AFB, AL
- 2005 Basic Instructor Course, Lackland AFB, TX
- 2005 Associate degree in Survival and Rescue Operations, Community College of the Air Force
- 2005 USAF Senior Noncommissioned Officer Academy (correspondence)
- 2007 USAF Senior Noncommissioned Officer Academy, Maxwell-Gunter AFB, AL
- 2009 Chief Leadership Course, Maxwell-Gunter AFB, AL
- 2011 Senior Enlisted Joint PME (correspondence)
- 2011 Keystone – National Defense University, Ft. McNair, Washington DC
- 2012 Gettysburg Leadership Experience, Gettysburg, PA
- 2012 USAF Leadership Enhancement Program, Center for Creative Leadership, Greensboro NC
- 2012 Latin America: A Political-Economic Conflict Seminar, Washington DC
- 2015 Enterprise Leadership Seminar, University of North Carolina, Chapel Hill, N.C.
- 2017 National and International Security Leadership Seminar, Washington D.C.
- 2017 Associate degree in Management Studies, University of Maryland, Md
- 2017 Bachelor of Science degree in Management Studies (cum laude), University of Maryland, Md..
- 2017 Professional Manager's Certification, University of Maryland, Md.
- 2019 Executive Education Program (Meta-Leadership), Harvard University, Cambridge MA

== Assignments ==
1. April 1991 – October 1992, Traffic Management Specialist, 7276th Air Base Group, Iraklion Air Station, Crete, Greece
2. October 1992 – September 1994, Traffic Management Journeyman, 12th Transportation Squadron, Randolph Air Force Base, Texas
3. September 1994 – October 1996, Pararescue student, Det 1 342nd Training Squadron, Kirtland Air Force Base, New Mexico
4. October 1996 – February 1999, Pararescue Journeyman, 48th Rescue Squadron, Holloman Air Force Base, New Mexico
5. February 1999 – January 2005, Special Tactics Element Leader, 24th Special Tactics Squadron, Pope Air Force Base, North Carolina
6. January 2005 – November 2006, Superintendent of Training/Chief Enlisted Manager, USAF PJ/CRO School, Kirtland Air Force Base, New Mexico
7. November 2006 – April 2009, Commandant, USAF PJ/CRO School, Kirtland Air Force Base, New Mexico
8. April 2009 – April 2011, Senior Enlisted Adviser, 24th Special Tactics Squadron, Pope Air Force Base, North Carolina
9. April 2011 – November 2011, Group Superintendent, 724th Special Tactics Group, Pope Field, North Carolina
10. November 2011 – January 2013, Command Chief, 1st Special Operations Wing, Hurlburt Field, Florida
11. January 2013 – June 2014, Command Chief, 18th Wing, Kadena Air Base, Okinawa, Japan
12. June 2014 – June 2016, Command Chief, United States Air Forces Central Command, Southwest Asia
13. June 2016 – September 2016, Senior Enlisted Advisor, Assistant Secretary of the Air Force, Manpower and Reserve Affairs, Headquarters United States Air Force, Pentagon, Washington, D.C.
14. September 2016 – November 2019, Senior Enlisted Leader, United States Africa Command, Kelley Barracks, Stuttgart, Germany
15. December 2019 – November 2023, Senior Enlisted Advisor to the Chairman of the Joint Chiefs of Staff, The Pentagon, Washington, DC

== Awards, decorations and honors ==
Colón-López' military decorations and badges are the following:

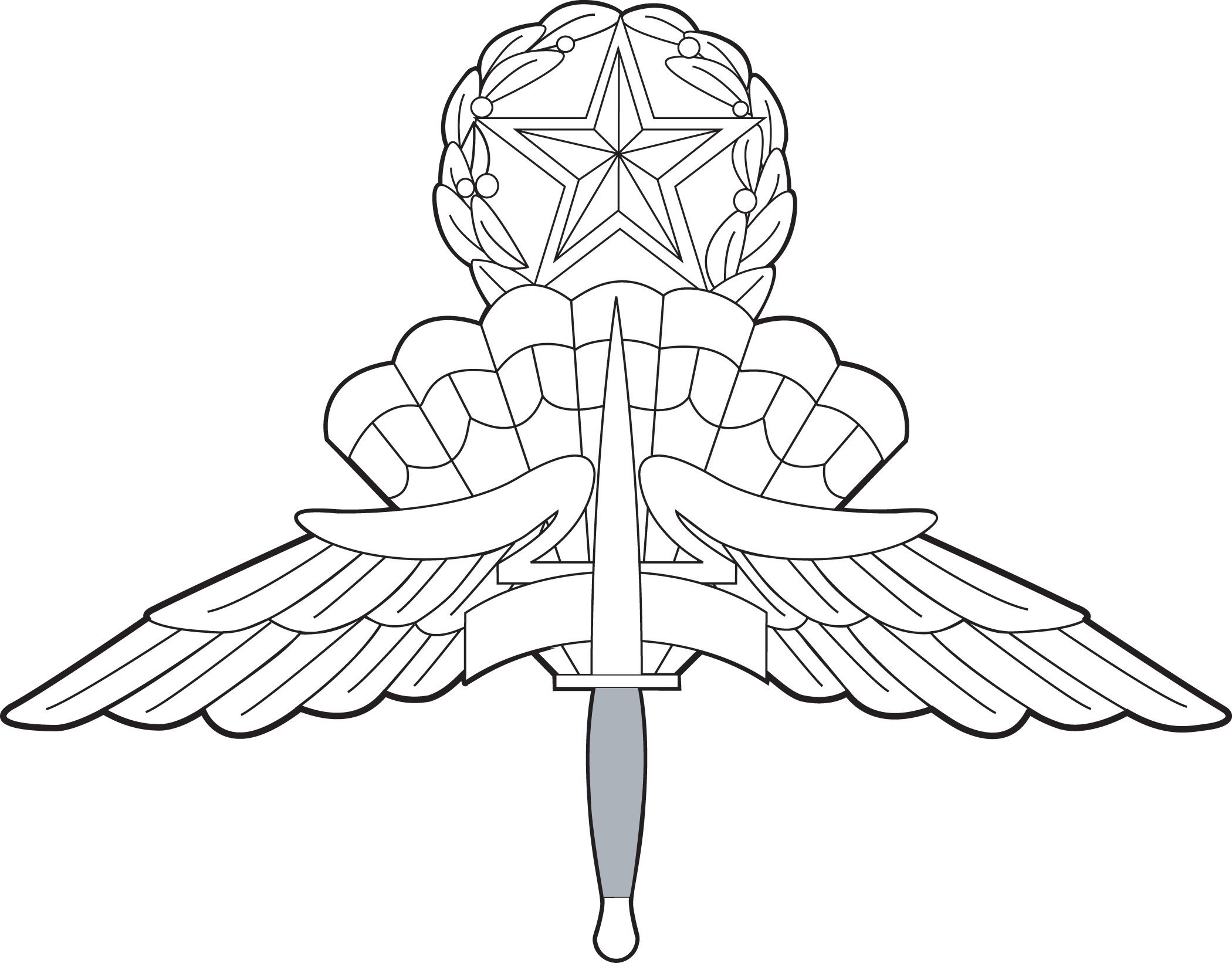

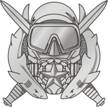

Badge	Basic US Air Force Enlisted Aircrew Badge		
Badge	Master Parachutist Badge		
Badge	Military Freefall Jumpmaster Badge		
1st row	Defense Distinguished Service Medal with one bronze oak leaf cluster		Defense Superior Service Medal with one bronze oak leaf cluster
2nd row	Legion of Merit	Bronze Star Medal with Valor device and oak leaf cluster	Defense Meritorious Service Medal
3rd row	Meritorious Service Medal with two bronze oak leaf clusters	Air Medal with bronze oak leaf cluster	Aerial Achievement Medal with two bronze oak leaf clusters
4th row	Air Force Commendation Medal with bronze oak leaf cluster	Joint Service Achievement Medal with bronze oak leaf cluster	Air Force Achievement Medal with bronze oak leaf cluster
5th row	Air Force Combat Action Medal	Air Force Presidential Unit Citation with bronze oak leaf cluster	Navy Presidential Unit Citation
6th row	Joint Meritorious Unit Award with four bronze oak leaf clusters	Air Force Meritorious Unit Award with one bronze oak leaf cluster	Air Force Outstanding Unit Award with Valor device and three bronze oak leaf clusters
7th row	Air Force Outstanding Unit Award (second ribbon to denote fifth award)	Combat Readiness Medal with silver oak leaf cluster and three bronze oak leaf clusters	Combat Readiness Medal (second ribbon to denote tenth award)
8th row	Air Force Good Conduct Medal with two silver oak leaf clusters	Air Force Recognition Ribbon with bronze oak leaf cluster	National Defense Service Medal with bronze service star
9th row	Armed Forces Expeditionary Medal	Southwest Asia Service Medal with bronze service star	Afghanistan Campaign Medal with two bronze service stars
10th row	Iraq Campaign Medal with one bronze service star	Global War on Terrorism Expeditionary Medal with three bronze service stars	Global War on Terrorism Service Medal
11th row	Air Force Overseas Long Tour Service Ribbon with two bronze oak leaf clusters	Air Force Expeditionary Service Ribbon with gold frame and silver oak leaf cluster	Air Force Longevity Service Award with one silver and one bronze oak leaf clusters
12th row	Non-Commissioned Officer Professional Development Ribbon with two bronze oak leaf clusters	Small Arms Expert Marksmanship Ribbon with bronze service star	Navy Expert Rifleman Medal
13th row	Navy Expert Pistol Shot Medal	Air Force Training Ribbon	Kuwait Liberation Medal (Kuwait)
Badges (chest pocket)	Joint Chiefs of Staff Identification Badge		Special Operations Diving Supervisor Badge

Other awards

- 1994 Senior Airman below the zone
- 1997 Leadership Award, Airman Leadership School
- 1998 Air Combat Command (ACC) Pararescue Noncommissioned Officer of the Year
- 2003 Commandant's Award and Distinguished Graduate, Gunter NCO Academy
- 2004 Air Force Pararescue Senior Noncommissioned Officer of the Year
- 2005 Air Force Lance P. Sijan Leadership Award recipient, Senior Noncommissioned Officer
- 2005 Team Kirtland Senior Noncommissioned Officer of the Year
- 2006 Jaycee's Ten Outstanding Young Americans USAF nominee to U.S. Chamber of Commerce
- 2013 Gathering of Eagles Inductee, USAF Air Command and Staff College
- 2017 Induction, Distinguished Veteran's Hall of Fame, Puerto Rico.
- 2020 NDIA DeProspero Lifetime Achievement Award
- 2023 Namesake, "Carretera SEAC Ramon Colon-Lopez", HWY116 in Guanica, Puerto Rico
- 2023 Euripides Rubio Medal, Commonwealth of Puerto Rico
- 2025 Gathering of Eagles Inductee (Second Award), USAF Air Command and Staff College
- 2026 Distinguished Alumnus, University of Maryland Global Campus

== See also ==
- List of Puerto Ricans
- List of Puerto Rican military personnel
- Hispanics in the United States Air Force

== Notes ==
Military offices
Preceded by Darrin J. Bohn	Senior Enlisted Leader of the U.S. Africa Command; 2016–2019	Succeeded by Richard D. Thresher
Preceded by John W. Troxell	Senior Enlisted Advisor to the Chairman; 2019–2023	Succeeded by Troy E. Black
