= Aerial port squadron =

Squadron of the United States Air Force

U.S. Air Force Air Transportation
- Air Force Transportation Basic Badge
- Country: United States of America
- Branch: United States Air Force
- Type: Logistics and Transportation
- Role: Load planning, airdrop operations, passenger and cargo handling.
- Size: 2,200
- Garrison/HQ: List of Aerial Port Squadrons
- Nickname(s): Port Dawg

Aerial Port Squadron (APS) is a United States Air Force organization which operates and provides the military logistical functions assigned to aerial ports, including processing personnel and cargo, rigging for airdrop, packing parachutes, loading equipment, preparing air cargo and load plans, loading and securing aircraft, ejecting cargo for inflight delivery, and supervising units engaged in aircraft loading and unloading operations.

In the United States Air Force it may be referred to by several names including Air Mobility Support Squadron, Air Mobility Squadron, Small Air Terminal, Mobile Aerial Port Squadron, and others. Smaller units performing the same mission may also be called Aerial Port Flights or Aerial Port Elements. Members of these units are normally graded by the Air Force Specialty Code (AFSC) of 2T2X1,(formerly 605X1) Air Transportation. These "Air Transportation Specialists" tend to refer to themselves as "Aerial Porters," "Porters," or "Port Dawgs."

Aerial Ports are responsible for all management and movement of cargo and passengers transported in the Military Airlift System. Most Aerial Ports are divided into specific duty sections: Ramp Services, Cargo Processing, Passenger Service (PAX), Air Terminal Operations Center (ATOC), Special Handling and Fleet Service. Of these sections, the ATOC is the nerve center. In this section all flow of cargo and passengers being handled by the Aerial Port is managed, accounted for, and tracked by the In-Transit Visibility System. Some Aerial Ports also have an Aerial Delivery section that pack parachutes and rigs training loads for air drop missions. These training loads are designed to simulate cargo that is dropped to units in combat conditions by parachute over locations in which aircraft cannot land.

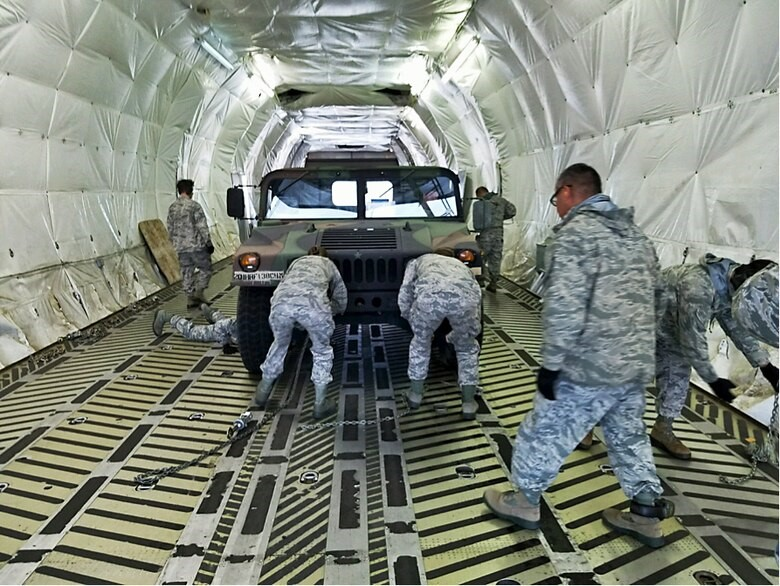
Members of the U.S. Air Force Reserve's 38th Aerial Port Squadron practice uploading cargo at Dobbins' Transportation Proficiency Center prior to the unit's 2017 deployment to Kuwait.

One of the most important functions performed by Aerial Porters is the Joint Inspection of hazardous cargo and equipment. When any customer requires the movement of these types of shipments certain requirements must be met under U.S. Department of Defense regulations. Joint Inspectors ensure that all of these requirements are met and that the shipment is safe for flight.

Because the logistical planning expertise they provide is so vital to the airlift mission, Aerial Porters may also be assigned or attached to other types of units that require their specific skills. Often these units are front line logistics units that have an Aerial Port function. Some of these units are Contingency Response Wings (CRW), Air Mobility Operations Groups (AMOG), and Tanker Airlift Control Elements (TALCE).

Official guidance on Aerial Port Squadrons can be found in Air Force Instruction (AFI) 24-101, Volume 18, Military Airlift - AMC Mobilized Aerial Port Forces and Aerial Delivery Flights and Back to Basics: A Handbook for Logistics Readiness and Aerial Port Squadron Commanders.

== See also ==
- List of United States Air Force aerial port squadrons
