= 724th Special Tactics Group =

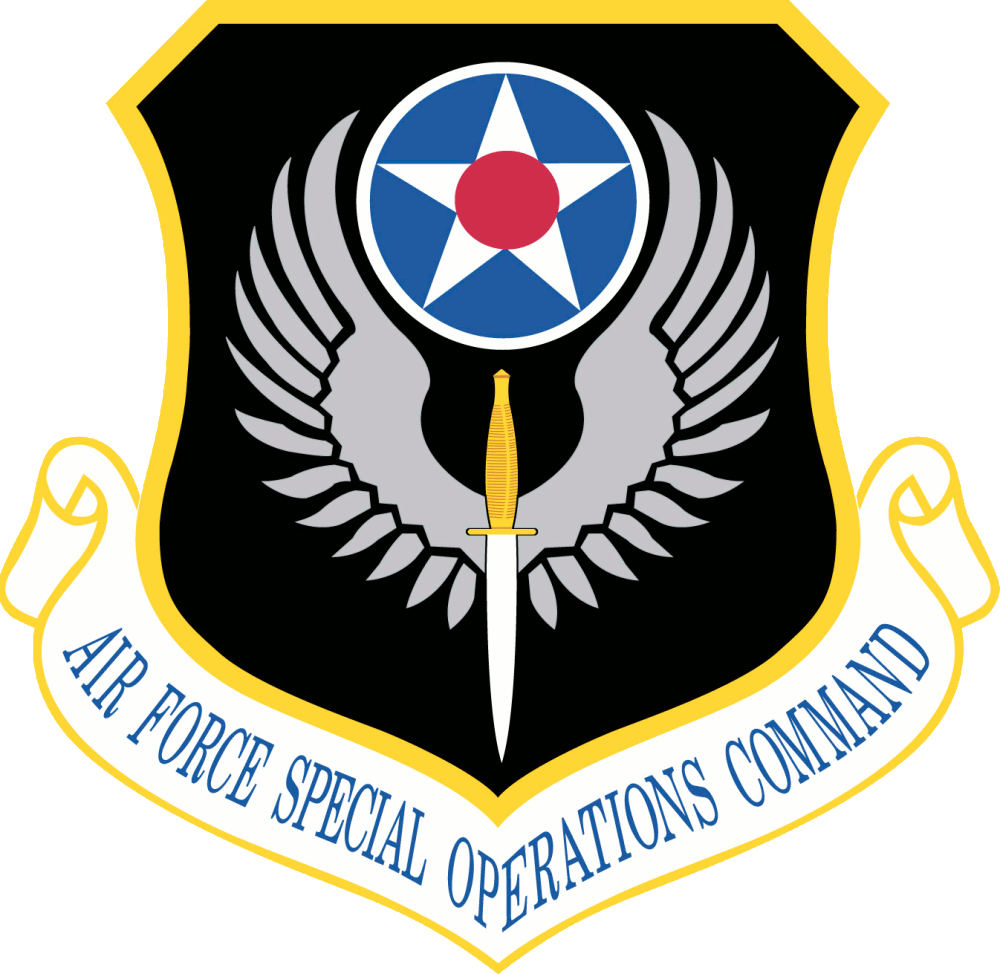
724th Special Tactics Group

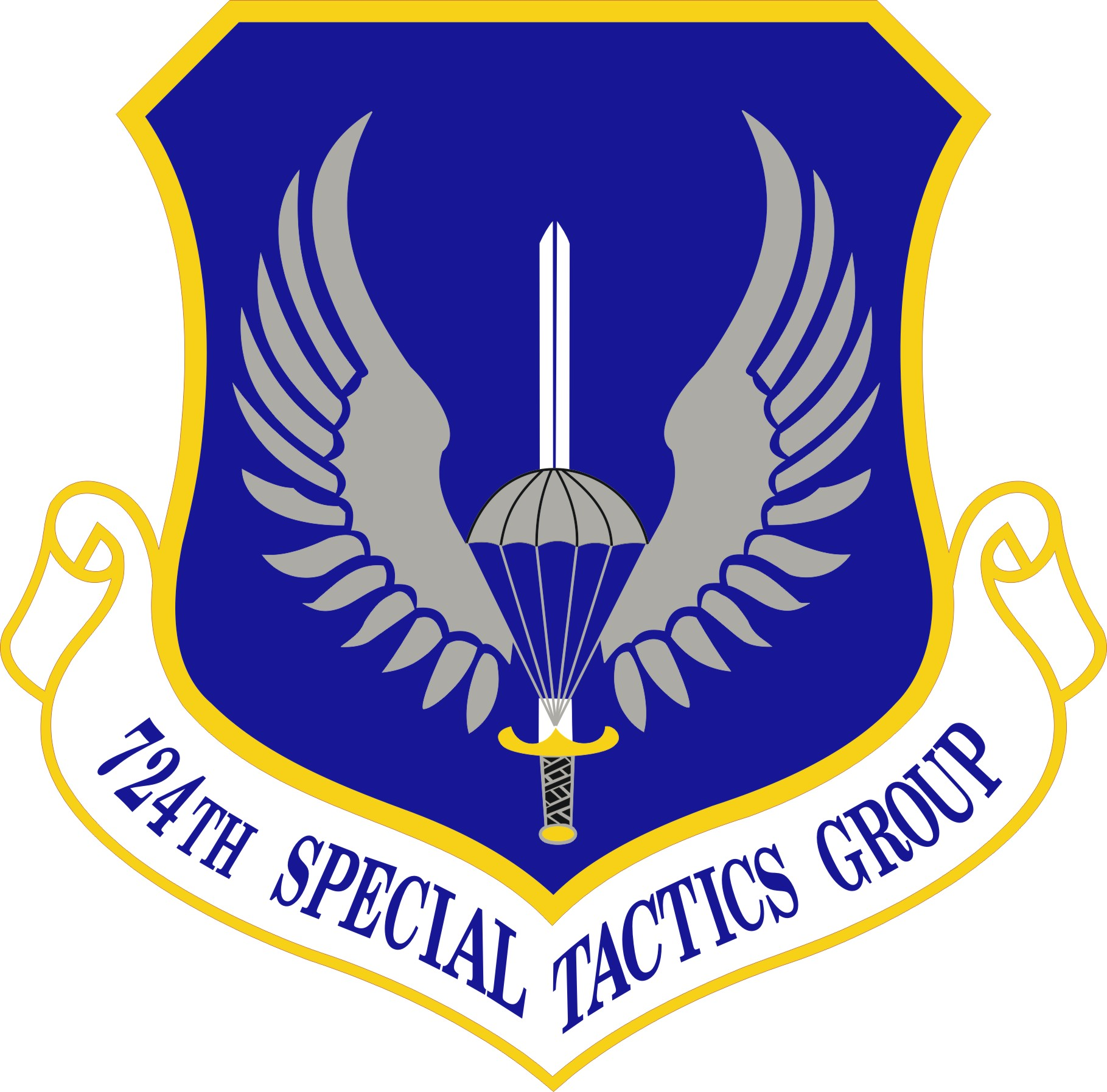
- 724th Special Tactics Group emblem (Note: Approved 19 April 2011.)
- Active: 1943–1944; 2011–present
- Country: United States
- Branch: United States Air Force
- Role: Special Operations Forces
- Part of: Air Force Special Operations Command
- Garrison/HQ: Pope Army Airfield
- Engagements: War in Afghanistan; Iraq War

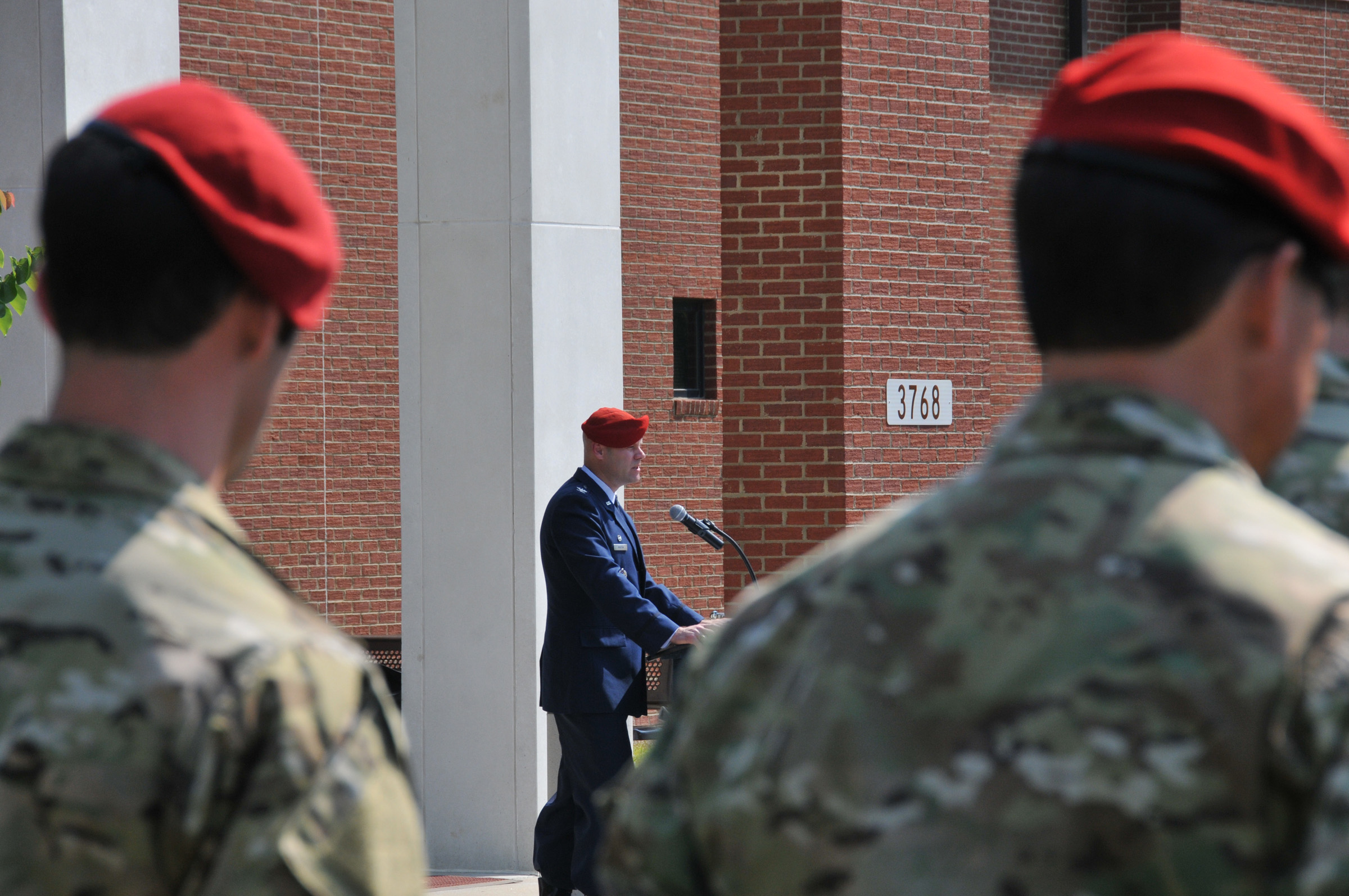
Then-Commander Colonel Michael Martin at a dedication ceremony honoring 24th STS Staff Sgt. Andrew Harvell who was killed in Afghanistan the previous year.

The 724th Special Tactics Group is one of the special operations ground components of the 24th Special Operations Wing, assigned to Air Force Special Operations Command. The group is headquartered at Pope Army Airfield, North Carolina. The group is composed of four squadrons, also located on Pope Field.

The group was initially created as the 724th Training Group on 22 January 1943 and activated on 28 February 1943. It was disbanded on 30 April 1944.

== Overview ==
The group's special tactics squadron is made up of Special Tactics Officers, Combat Controllers, Combat Rescue Officers, Pararescuemen, Special Reconnaissance, United States Air Force Tactical Air Control Party officers and enlisted personnel, and a number of combat support airmen which comprise 58 Air Force specialties.

Special tactics squadrons are organized, trained and equipped specifically for various special operations missions facilitating air operations on the battlefield. They conduct combat search and rescue missions, collect intelligence, as well as call in close air support or airstrikes against enemy combatants and are often partnered with other U.S. special operations forces overseas.

== Lineage ==
- Established as the 724th Training Group on 22 January 1943 and activated on 28 February 1943. Disbanded on 30 April 1944.
- Reestablished, and redesignated as 724th Special Tactics Group on 1 March 2011
- Activated on 29 April 2011

=== Subordinate units ===
- 17th Special Tactics Squadron, Fort Moore, Georgia, 1 October 2020 – Present
- 24th Special Tactics Squadron, Pope Army Airfield, North Carolina, 29 April 2011 – Present
- 724th Operations Support Squadron, Pope Army Airfield, North Carolina, 29 April 2011 – Present
- 724th Intelligence Squadron, Pope Army Airfield, North Carolina, 29 April 2011 – Present
- 724th Special Tactics Support Squadron, Pope Army Airfield, North Carolina, 29 April 2011 – Present

=== Assignments ===
- Army Air Forces Technical Training Command, 28 Feb 1943–25 September 1943
- 76th Training Wing, 25 September 1943 – 30 April 1944
- Air Force Special Operations Command, 29 April 2011 – present

=== Stations ===
- Army Air Force Training Center#7, Atlantic City, New Jersey, 28 February 1943 – 16 June 1943
- Seymour Johnson Field, North Carolina, 16 June 1943 – 30 April 1944
- Pope Air Force Base (later Pope Army Airfield), North Carolina 29 April 2011 – present

== Commanders ==
- April 2011 – June 2012, Col. Matthew 'Wolfe' Davidson
- June 2012 – July 2014, Col. Michael Martin

== Notes ==
Explanatory notes

Citations
