= United States Air Force Tactical Air Control Party =

U.S. Air Force Tactical Air Control Party
- United States Air Force TACP Flash with Crest
- Country: United States of America
- Branch: United States Air Force
- Size: approx. 1100
- Part of: Air Combat Command; U.S. Air Forces Europe; Pacific Air Forces; Air Force Special Warfare (AFSPECWAR)
- Mottos: Official: "The Strong Shall Stand, The Weak Will Fall by the Wayside"; Other mottos: "Death on Call"; "Wreak Havoc"; "Air to Mud"; "Advise, Assist, Control"
- Color of Beret: Black

Insignia
- TACP and TACP-O black beret

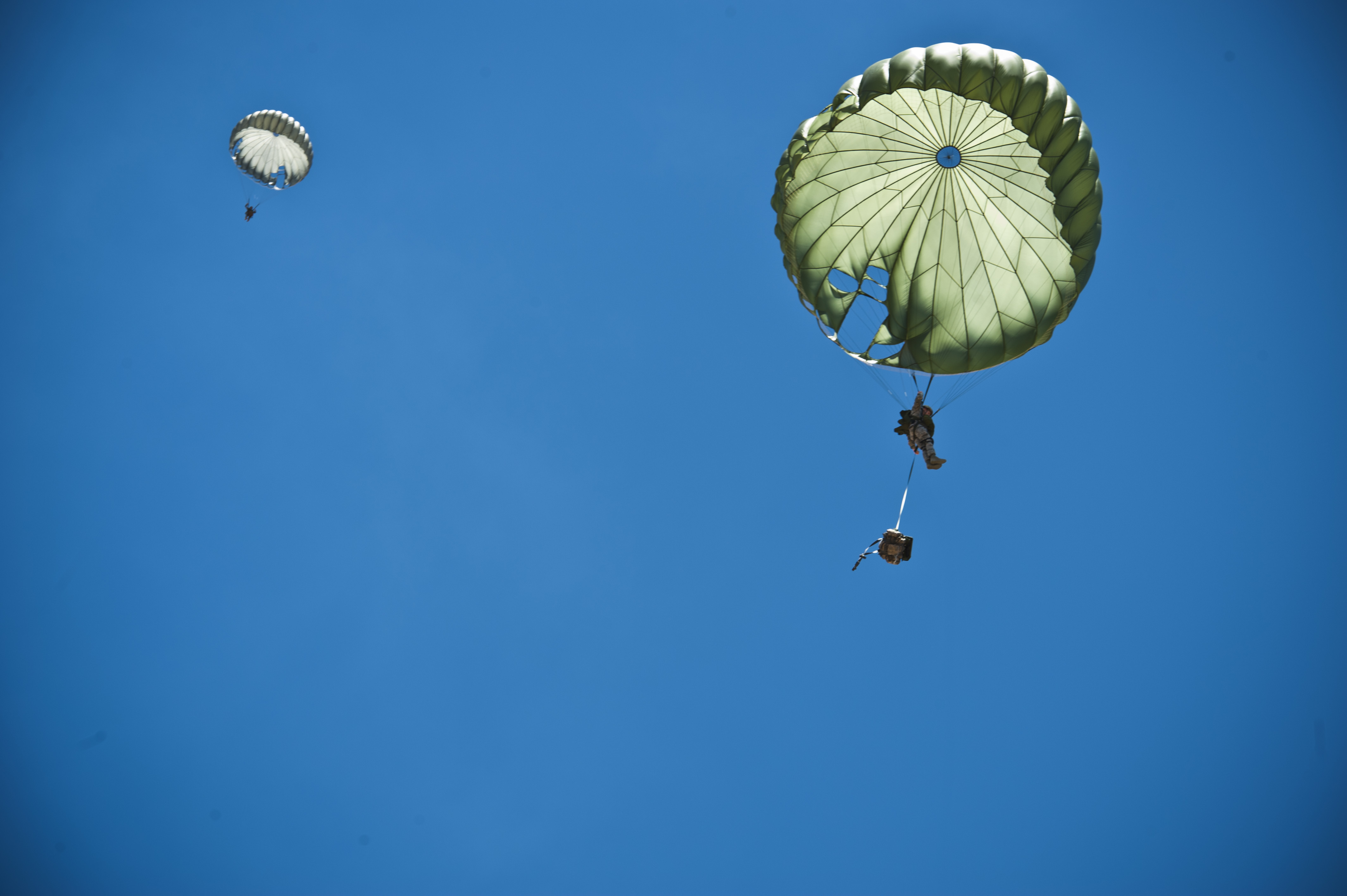
An Air Liaison Officer with the 14th Air Support Operations Squadron, parachutes to the ground during a joint forcible entry exercise 31 May 2013, at the Nevada Test and Training Range at Nellis Air Force Base, Nevada.

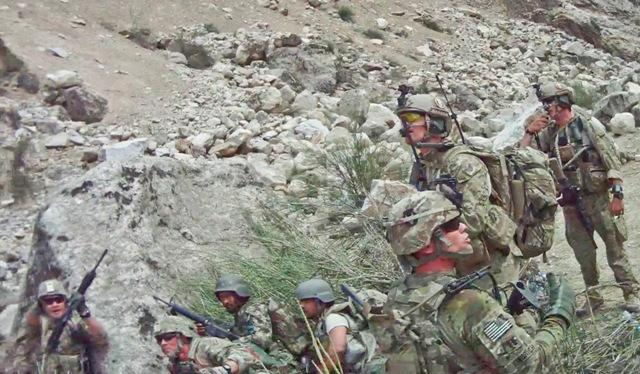
USAF TACPs in the Battle of Do Ab. In the battle, a scout platoon from the 1st Battalion, 133rd Infantry Regiment, United States Army, 20 Afghan soldiers, and two United States Air Force TACPs were ambushed by over 300 Taliban near the village of Do Ab. With assistance from close air support, the coalition forces repulsed the ambush, killing approximately 270 Taliban.

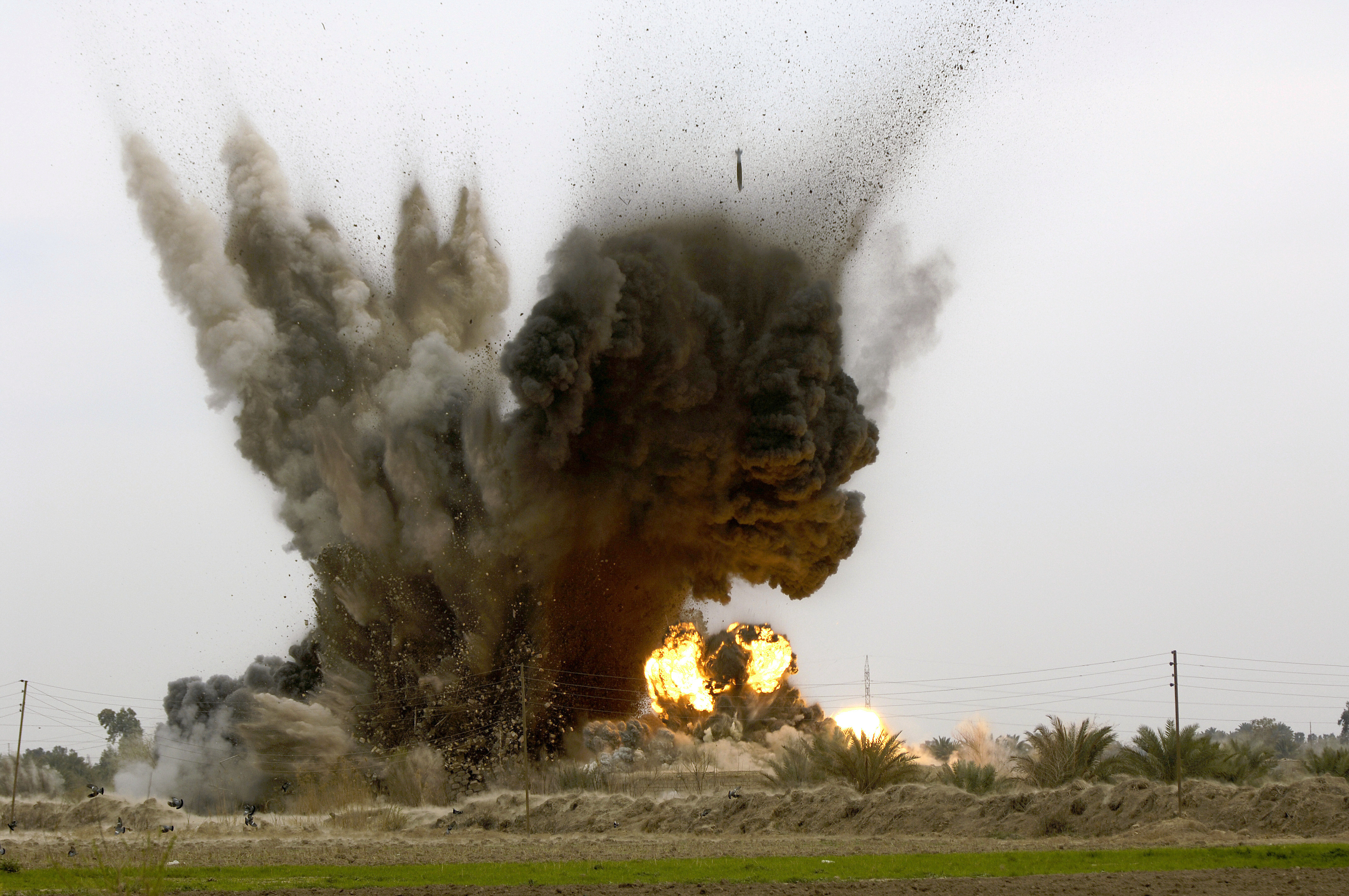
Six GBU-38 munitions are dropped by a B-1B Lancer aircraft onto an insurgent torture house and prison in Northern Zambraniyah, Iraq, 10 March 2008. The munitions drop was cleared by a USAF TACP from Fort Cavazos, Texas, and deployed with the 2nd Brigade Combat Team, 3rd Infantry Division.

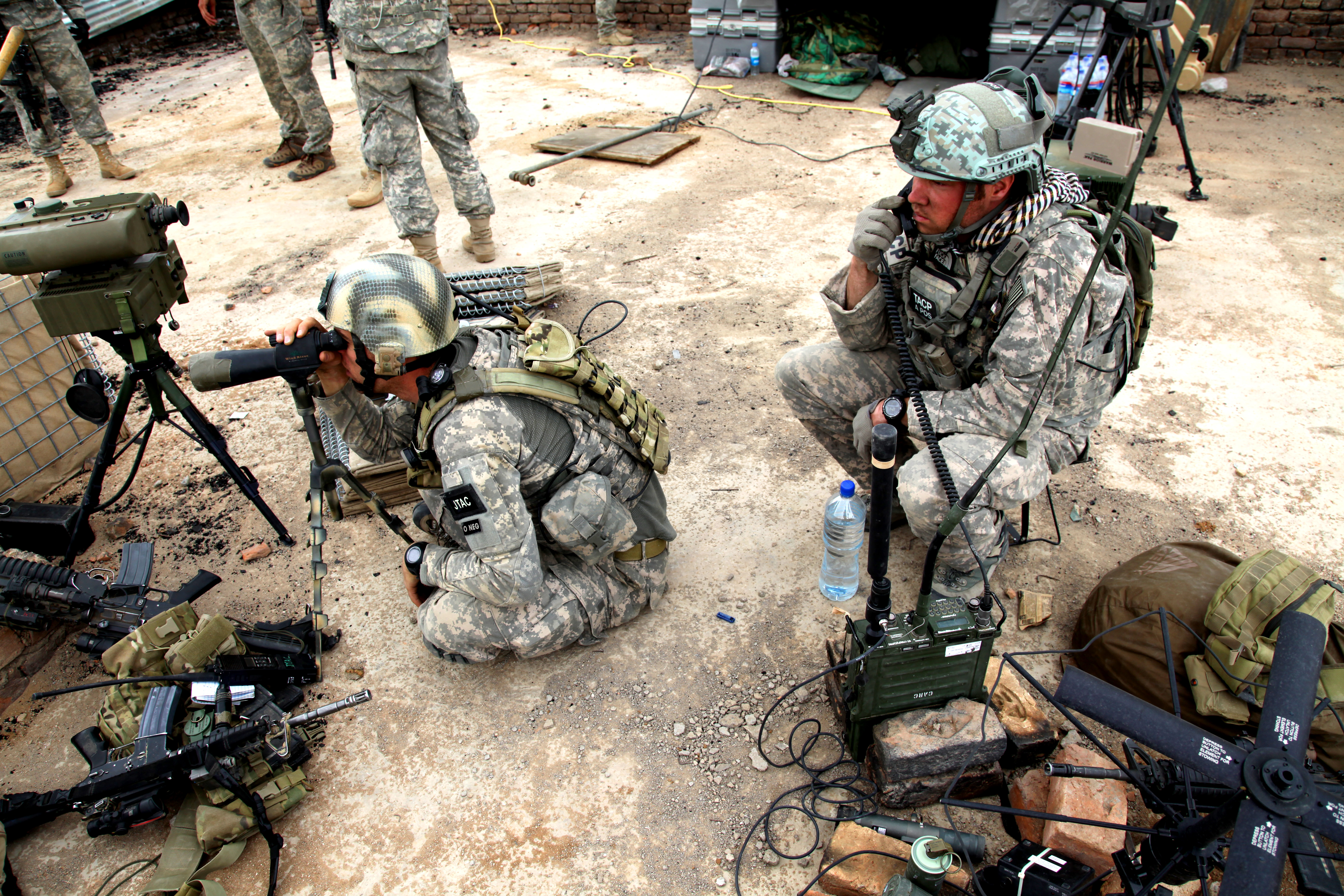
USAF 1Z3X1 TACPs providing over-watch and close air support in Jaghato, Afghanistan. Most USAF TACP teams consist of a junior 1Z3X1 and a 1Z3X1 certified as a Joint Terminal Attack Controller (JTAC) who provides terminal control of close air support missions.

A United States Air Force Tactical Air Control Party, commonly abbreviated TACP, is an individual or team of United States Air Force Special Warfare Airmen with AFSC 1Z3X1, who are aligned with conventional, Special Operation Forces, and Tier 1 combat maneuver units. They provide precision terminal attack control and terminal attack guidance of U.S. and coalition fixed- and rotary-wing close air support aircraft, artillery, and naval gunfire; establish and maintain command and control (C2) communications; and advise ground commanders on the best use of air power.

TACPs are Special Warfare airmen who operate in multiple contexts. Most commonly, TACPs serve as the principal Air Force liaison element to the United States Army (USA), where they align with combat maneuver echelons from Corps to Battalion level. The TACP provides its aligned Army unit with expertise in planning and executing airpower in support of the land component commander's scheme of maneuver. In special operations settings, TACPs deploy with "white" SOF units, including Air Force Special Tactics, Army Special Forces, and Navy SEAL teams, as well with Army Rangers and Joint Special Operations Command Special Mission Units, acting primarily as precision airstrike controllers, communications, and command-and-control experts.

== Overview ==
The USAF TACP, when operationally employed as an element of the Theater Air Control System (TACS), is subordinate to the Air Support Operations Center (ASOC), which in turn is subordinate to the Air Operations Center (AOC). The AOC is the senior TACS agency responsible for the centralized control and decentralized execution of airpower in support of the Joint Force Commander. The USAF/USA Memorandum requires the USAF to provide Air Liaison Officers, Battalion Air Liaison Officers, enlisted technicians (1Z3X1s) skilled in planning, requesting, and managing airpower resources, and 1Z3X1 Joint Terminal Attack Controllers (JTACs). JTACs are specially trained and certified airmen who provide terminal control of airpower, usually in the form of Close Air Support missions. The TACP also provides USAF Intelligence, Space, Electronic Warfare, Weather, and other liaisons to the Army. These liaisons serve as USAF subject-matter experts within their areas of expertise and assist in planning and integrating these functions with their aligned Army unit. All of these USAF liaison personnel are assigned to a USAF Air Support Operations Squadron. Operationally, liaisons serve within a TACP aligned with an Army Brigade Combat Team (BCT), Division, or Corps. 1Z3X1s and Air Liaison Officers serve in TACPs at Army echelons from battalion through corps.

== Overview of the AFSC ==
Until 2015, initial AFSC training for TACP Candidates took place at Hurlburt Field, Florida, an annex of Eglin Air Force Base and home to Air Force Special Operations Command. Training was subsequently moved to the Chapman Training Annex of Lackland Air Force Base in San Antonio, Texas, where the initial selection and training for all Air Force Special Warfare career fields now takes place. Graduates of the TACP schoolhouse (AFSC 1Z3X1) attend USAF Survival, Evasion, Resistance, and Escape (SERE) School at Fairchild AFB, Washington, and Basic Airborne School at Fort Benning, Georgia, and the Joint Terminal Attack Controller Qualification Course at Nellis AFB, Nevada, after which they are assigned to a TACP unit to undergo initial mission readiness training and skill level upgrade.

Most TACP personnel are assigned to Air Support Operations Squadrons (ASOS), which are organized, trained and equipped to perform one of two functions, that of a Tactical Air Control Party or an Air Support Operations Center (ASOC). 1Z3X1s are experts on man-portable, vehicle-mounted, and field-expedient communications and are trained in weapons and fieldcraft, including navigation, individual and crew-served weapons systems, small unit tactics, demolitions, and Close Air Support tactics, techniques, and procedures (TTPs).

=== Air Support Operations Squadrons ===
The USAF Air Support Operations Squadron (ASOS), which derives its name from the Close Air Support that TACPs specialize in, is usually located on an Army installation. An ASOS is commanded by an Air Force Lieutenant Colonel who also serves as the senior Air Liaison Officer for an Army Division. The TACP mission is to support the host Army division and its subordinate brigade combat teams (BCTs), which are the basic deployable unit in the US Army. TACPs are located on nearly all major Army installations, and 1Z3X1s are primarily assigned to various ASOSs on Army installations throughout the U.S. and overseas during their careers. As an unstated prerequisite to a career as a 1Z3X1, it is understood that 1Z3X1s live, train and deploy with U.S. Army combat units worldwide under some of the most demanding and difficult conditions in often very austere environments. Additionally, there are numerous ASOSs within the Air National Guard that have actively participated in combat operations worldwide supporting the Global War on Terror since 9/11.

When assigned to a TACP, the mission of the 1Z3X1 is to advise and assist Army ground commanders and fire support officers in planning and employing airpower in accordance with joint Army and Air Force doctrine and tactics, techniques, and procedures. Because of their position in the USAF, which places enlisted airmen in positions of authority and responsibility normally held by commissioned officers, 1Z3X1s must be thoroughly proficient in airpower and joint operations while also possessing the skills and training necessary to integrate into the joint-service units to which they are assigned. During a TACP assignment, 1Z3X1s must maintain a high degree of self-motivation, enthusiasm, and willingness to operate as the sole airman on a joint team. TACP assignments also provide opportunities for 1Z3X1s to increase their knowledge, skills, and operational capabilities by attending Military Freefall, Air Assault, Pathfinder, Ranger, and Special Forces Combat Diver schools.

=== Air Support Operations Center ===
The Air Support Operations Center (ASOC) is an element of the Theater Air Control System (TACS) aligned with the senior Army maneuver unit (Division or Corps/Corps equivalent) in theater and directly subordinate to the Air Operations Center, which is the senior TACS agency in a theater. Organizationally, ASOCs are also Air Support Operations Squadrons and named as such, but organized and equipped as an ASOC. ASOCs are commanded by an Air Force Lt Col. The ASOC manages allotted air resources and executes missions supporting its aligned Army units. 1Z3X1s assigned to an ASOC fill a vital role by receiving air support requests from forward deployed JTACs. Once an air support request is received, the air support request is either approved or disapproved by the ground commander's land component chain of command. If approved, immediate requests to support urgent, troops-in-contact situations may result in strike aircraft being sent by the ASOC to the JTACs location for terminal control of immediate close air support. Approved, but non-urgent, air support requests submitted after the cut-off time for inclusion on the next Air Tasking Order will become scheduled missions on the subsequent Air Tasking Order. If an air support request is disapproved, the disapproved request should be sent back to the requesting unit with reasons for disapproval. Approval and disapproval authority of air support requests is the responsibility of the Army / Land Component being supported.

=== Special Tactics TACP ===
The US Special Operations Command was established in 1987 at MacDill AFB, Florida. One MSgt. 1Z3X1 (then AFSC 275X0) was assigned to the command as a liaison, but the position was disestablished in approximately 1991. In 1997, two MSgt. JTAC-qualified 1Z3X1s assigned to the 17th ASOS at Fort Benning, Georgia were selected for assignment to two of the Air Force Special Operations Command's Special Tactics Squadrons. TACP flights have been co-located with each Army Special Forces Group, each of the 75th Ranger Regiment's three battalions, and the 160th Special Operations Aviation Regiment (Airborne). TACPs deployed with Operational Detachment Alpha teams from multiple Special Forces groups and with the 75th Ranger Regiment in both Operation Enduring Freedom (OEF) and Operation Iraqi Freedom (OIF). Additionally, in OIF, a small number of TACP personnel were assigned to the United States Air Force's 24th Special Tactics Squadron (STS), the Air Force's Joint Special Operations Command (JSOC) special mission unit, and to a time-sensitive targeting (TST) cell dedicated to prosecuting high-value targets and targets of opportunity in support of JSOC's special mission units and their objectives.

In 2008, following its transfer from Air Combat Command to Air Force Special Operations Command, the 17th ASOS (Ft. Benning, Georgia), which provided JTACs and ALOs to the 75th Ranger Regiment and its three line battalions, was redesignated the 17th Special Tactics Squadron. JTAC-qualified 1Z3X1s at the "5" or "Journeyman" skill level may apply for a Special Tactics assignment within Air Force Special Operations Command (AFSOC). TACP personnel at the 17th STS (and, in smaller numbers, at the four remaining active-duty CONUS Special Tactics Squadrons), provide terminal attack control and fire support expertise for the 75th Ranger Regiment's three Ranger Battalions and Regimental Reconnaissance Company, all seven Army Special Forces Groups, and multiple Navy SEAL Teams. Some TACPs who have successfully undergone screening and selection are currently serving with the 24th STS.

=== TACP Officer ===
The USAF TACP Officer or TACPO (formerly Air Liaison Officer) is assigned to an ASOS or ASOC as the USAF airpower advocate, subject-matter expert, and advisor to his or her aligned Army or Marine staff. Until 2009, this USAF officer was a rated officer. In 2005, then Captain Mark R. Wisher submitted an Innovative Development through Employee Awareness (IDEA) Report submission through the Air Force's IDEA program office based on his 2004 Master's Thesis which proposed the creation of a brand new non-rated ALO career field. The IDEA program submission was staffed at Headquarters AF (HAF/A3O) for consideration and ultimately resulted in a HAF-funded RAND Report that was completed in 2008. The RAND report relied heavily on the previous research of Wisher, John Olivero, and Raymond Knox. The RAND report ultimately concurred with Wisher's recommendation to create a non-rated ALO career field. The following year, the USAF created a new non-rated Air Liaison Officer AFSC, 13L, to form a career force of professional Air Liaison Officers and the AF began the first beta class of non-rated ALOs in the summer of 2009. Upon completion of initial qualification training, these non-rated officers are awarded the 13L AFSC. Sometime in 2019, the Air Force changed the name of the 13L AFSC from Air Liaison Officer to TACP Officer.

Potential 19ZBs will first attend a two phase assessment and selection process before attending their initial skills training. Phase I involves completing an application and PAST that is submitted to a review board of TACP Officers. If the review board sees potential in a candidate, they will invite the candidate to Phase II, also called TOPT (TACP Officer Phase Two). TOPT involves one week of extensive testing and evaluation by TACP Cadre to see if candidates are capable of operating in the rigorous TACPO career field. Events at TOPT include numerous written and psychological tests and interviews, Group Leadership Problems (GLPs), long distance runs and ruck marches with combat gear and rigorous physical training. If candidates are selected they will attend the TACP Officer Prep Course followed by the TACP Officer Basic Course based at Lackland AFB, Texas; the Joint Firepower Course (JFC) and Basic ALO Skills Course (BASC) at Nellis AFB, Nevada; and finally Air Force SERE School at Fairchild AFB, Washington.

The TACPO represents the Joint/Combined Forces Air Component Commander as a member of the Army commander's special staff at the Battalion through Corps echelons in a coalition, joint, or interagency force. He provides subject matter expertise to lead, plan, and manage Command-and-Control and terminal execution of Air, Space, and Cyber operations in direct support of land component forces. The TACPO assists in developing fire support coordination plans to include Close Air Support (CAS), Air Interdiction (AI), Intelligence, Surveillance and Reconnaissance (ISR), Electronic Warfare (EW), and Suppression/Destruction of Enemy Air Defenses (SEAD/DEAD). The TACPO may engage enemy forces using advanced technologies and weapon systems to direct lethal and non-lethal fires and effects in close proximity to friendly forces as a Joint Terminal Attack Controller (JTAC). Additional TACPO training may include, but are not limited to:

- US Army Airborne School – Three week course at Fort Benning where attendees learn the basics of static-line parachute operations.
- Joint Terminal Attack Controller Qualification Course – Four week course at Nellis AFB, Nevada where attendees qualify as JTACs.
- Air Force Special Tactics TACP Advance Skills Course – 12 week course put on by the Special Tactics Training Squadron at Hurlburt Field, Fla. where ST TACPO learn and enhance necessary skills required to operate within USSOCOM units.
- Ranger Assessment and Selection (RASP 2) – Three week selection course for senior NCOs, Officers, and Warrant Officers for leadership positions within the 75th Ranger Regiment. RASP 2 tests candidates on their physical and mental capabilities while learning the special tactics, techniques and procedures of the 75th Ranger Regiment (Note: TACPOs assigned to the 17th Special Tactics Squadron, the Air Force unit assigned to provide TACP and TACPO to the regiment, must attend RASP 2).

=== TACP Beret and history ===
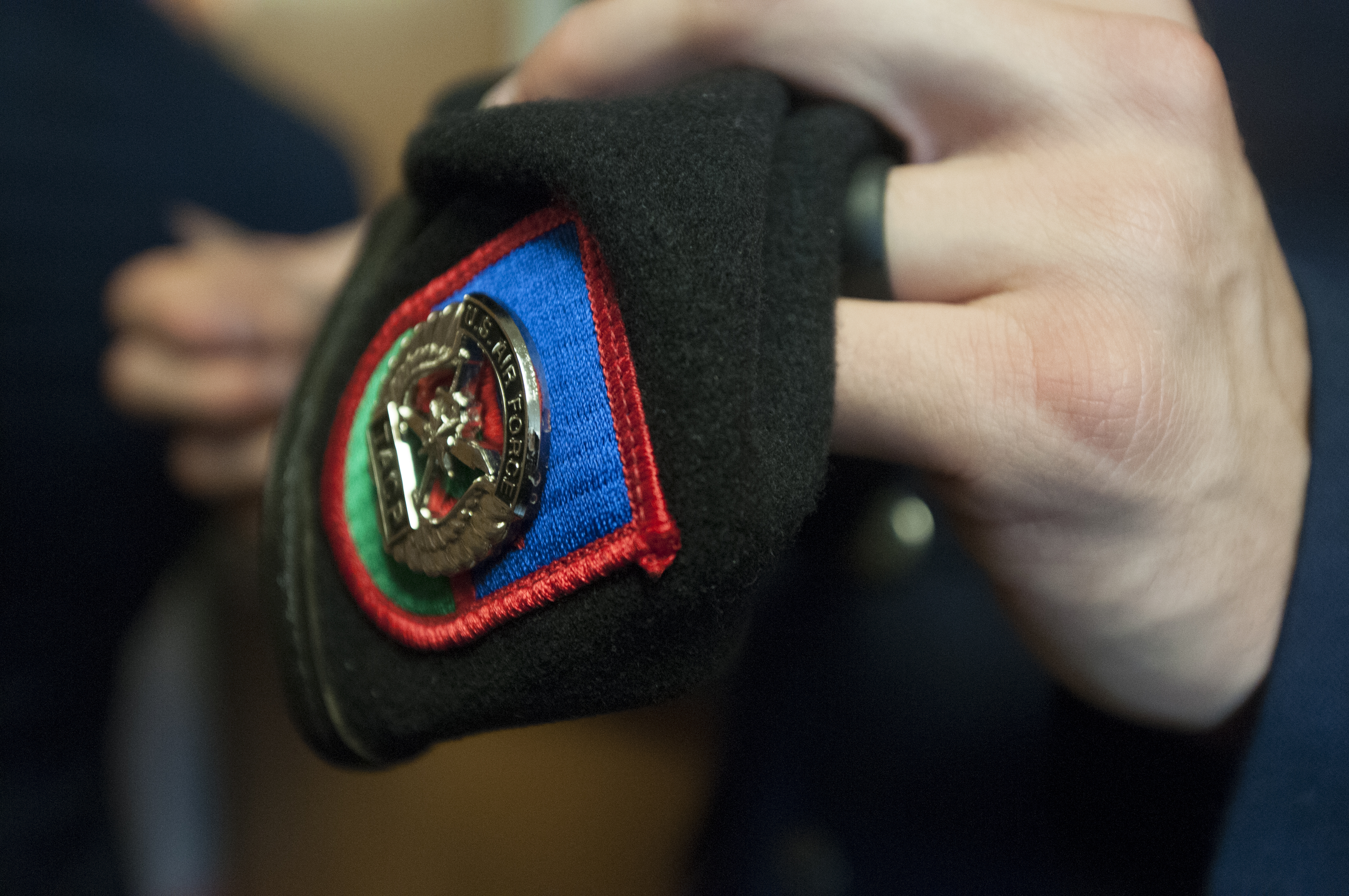
US Air Force's Tactical Air Control Party black beret, beret flash, and crest

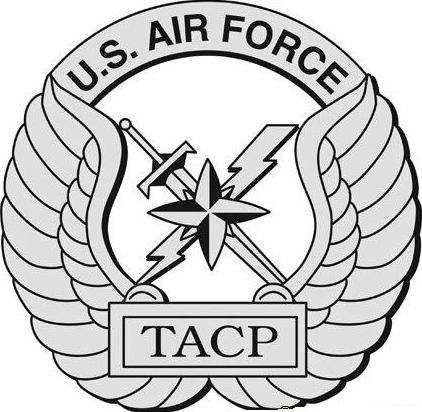
Tactical Air Control Party Crest

Tactical Air Control Party beret flash

In 1979, the black beret was authorized for wear by enlisted personnel in the Tactical Air Control Party. In 1984, two airmen from Pope Air Force Base, North Carolina submitted the current flash and crest design. It was approved for all TACP airmen in 1985. Tactical Air Control Party specialists (AFSC 1Z3X1) are currently the only United States Air Force specialty allowed to wear the coveted black beret as part of their daily duty uniform wear. TACP Officers (TACPOs) are also authorized to wear the black beret after they graduate from the Basic ALO Skills Course (BASC), conducted at Nellis Air Force Base, Nevada.

=== TACP Flash and Crest Heraldry ===
The US Air Force ordinary holds the position of honor at the top of the crest. It is supported by the erect wings, which symbolize the combat ready United States Air Force and the Theater Air Control System. At the bottom of the wings rests the TACP ordinary, representing the most forward element of the Theater Air Control System. The sword symbolizes the strength and firepower controlled by the TACP, while the lightning bolt represents a modern-day standard for communications, the backbone of the TACP. The eight-point omni-directional star symbolizes the worldwide mobility commitment of the TACP, as well as his ability to navigate over all terrain. The scarlet border of the cloth flash symbolizes the immense firepower that can be brought to bear when Air Force and Army assets are combined. The red dovetail divider symbolizes the strong interlocking relationship between the Army, the field of green, and the Air Force, the field of blue, created by the liaison functions of the TACP.

== 1Z3X1 Initial Qualification Training ==
After graduating Basic Military Training, all enlisted 1Z3X1 candidates are sent to Medina Annex of Lackland AFB, Texas to attend a five-day indoctrination course. Those candidates who successfully complete indoctrination attend the 85-day 1Z3X1 3-level (Apprentice) initial qualification training course at Lackland AFB, Texas. The 3-level course was held at Hurlburt Field, Florida for 36 years prior to the July 2015 move to Texas. Those who successfully complete the initial training course are awarded the "3" or "apprentice" skill level and then attend the USAF Survival School at Fairchild AFB, Washington. Not including the TACP Preparatory Course, the attrition rate of the 1Z3X1 3-level course has been approximately 70%, with some classes reaching a 90% attrition rate. This relatively high rate is primarily attributed to the constant physical demands students face throughout the entire length of the course, with the difficulty level increasing until graduation. The relentless physical demands combined with a challenging academic curriculum require constant focus on attention to detail. After completing initial training and arriving at the first duty station, training continues with the goal of obtaining Combat Mission Readiness. After one year of maintaining Combat Mission Ready (CMR) status and possessing the "5" or "journeyman" skill level, 1Z3X1s are eligible to attend the Joint Terminal Attack Controller qualification course at Nellis AFB, or if stationed in Germany or Italy, the USAFE Air-Ground Operations School. Course attendance is based on training NCO and commander recommendation and is not guaranteed.

=== TACP Preparatory Course ===
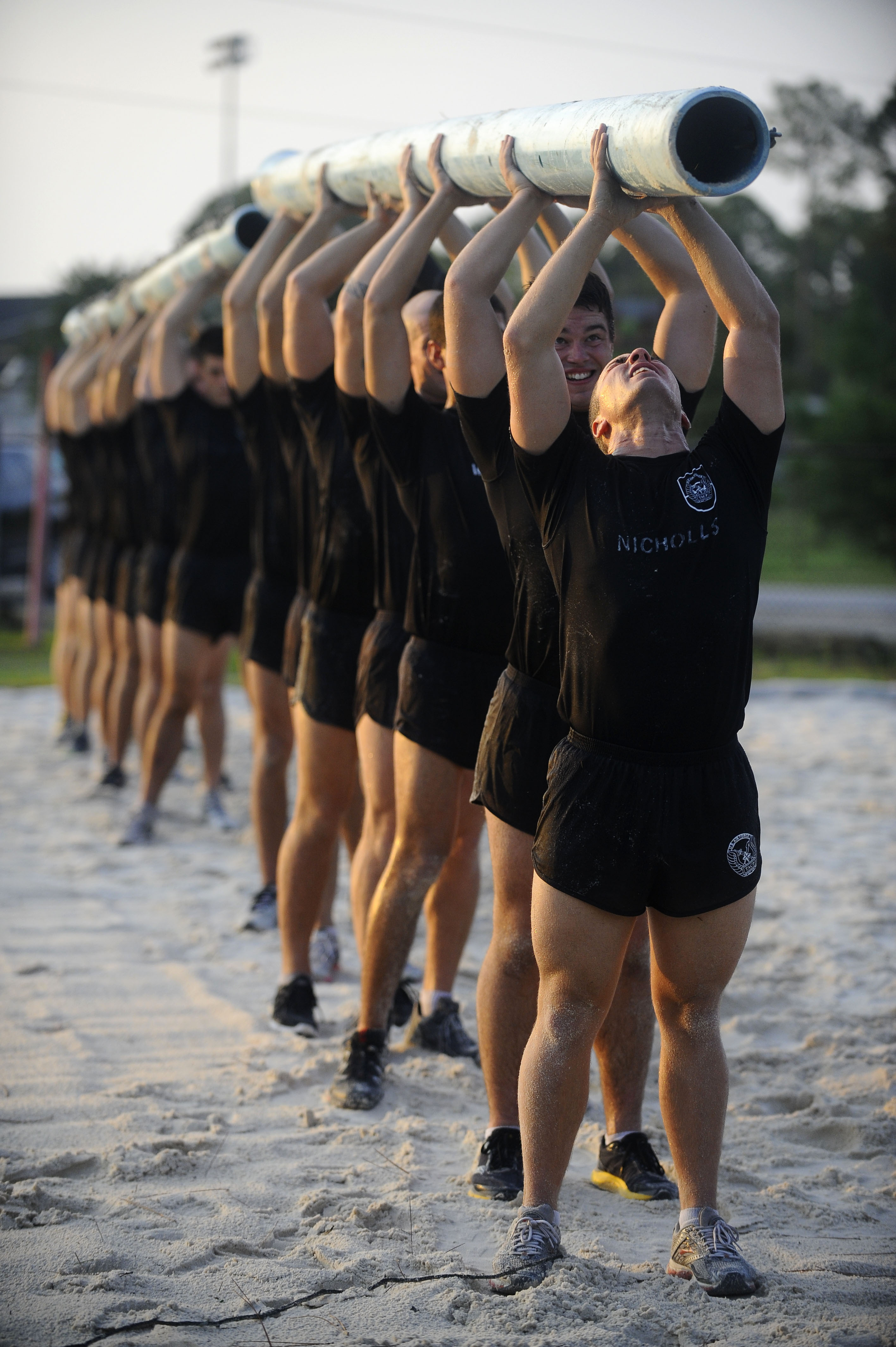
USAF TACP candidates raise a pole during a team building exercise at Hurlburt Field, Fla., 10 August 2011. The pole weighs approximately 300 pounds, therefore requiring all of the full strength of the candidates to complete such a rigorous task.

Enlisted 1Z3X1 candidates and 13L TACPO candidates will attend a 5-day indoctrination course at Medina Annex immediately following basic military training and completion of special warfare prep. The course educates candidates on the TACP career field and also identifies candidates unsuitable for the AFSC. An entry-level Physical Abilities and Stamina Test (PAST) test and a 4-mile timed ruck march must be successfully completed to pass the Indoctrination course and progress to the Initial Qualification Course at Lackland Air Force Base.

=== Initial Training ===
- Block I Basic Career Knowledge (30 Days)

Portable radio familiarization, basic career knowledge, and associated publications.

- Block II Ground Environment Training (30 Days)

Field training exercise, day and night land navigation, vehicle navigation, convoy training, and small unit tactics. Also including training in bivouac setup, site selection, and patrolling methods.

- Block III Air Support Coordination/Weapons Systems (25 Days)

Methods and means of requesting close air support, weapons effects and utilization, and other coordination procedures.

=== Advanced Training ===
- United States Air Force Combat Survival School – 3 weeks, Fairchild AFB, Washington

This course teaches basic survival techniques for remote areas using minimal equipment. This includes instruction of principles, procedures, equipment and techniques that help individuals to survive regardless of climatic conditions or unfriendly environments, and return with honor.

- United States Army Airborne School** – Basic Parachutist Course – 3 weeks, Fort Benning, Georgia

Students learn the basic parachuting skills required to infiltrate an objective area by static line airdrop. This course includes ground operations week, tower week, and "jump week" when participants make five parachute jumps. Personnel who complete this training are awarded the basic parachutist rating and are allowed to wear the Parachutist Badge.

**Note: Some of these courses are unit dependent and not all students may be selected.

=== Further Advanced Training ===
- Military Freefall Parachutist Course – 5 weeks – Yuma Proving Ground, Arizona.
- Static Line Jumpmaster School – 3 weeks – Ft. Benning, Georgia.
- Military Freefall Jumpmaster School – 3 weeks – Yuma Proving Ground, Arizona.
- Pathfinder School – 3 weeks – Ft. Benning, Georgia.
- Air Assault School – 2 weeks – Various Locations
- Ranger School – 61 Days, Ft. Benning, Georgia.
- Special Forces Combat Diver Qualification Course (Special Operations Diver Course) – 7 weeks – Special Forces Underwater Operations School, Key West, Florida.
- Special Tactics Advanced Skills Course – 12 weeks, Hurlburt Field, Florida.
- Combat Medic Course – 16 weeks, Fort Sam Houston, Texas.

== Notable 1Z3X1 TACPs ==
Silver Star Recipients:

- Achey, Stephen – For conspicuous gallantry and intrepidity in action with military operations against an armed enemy of the United States at the Shah-i-Kot Valley, Afghanistan, in support of Operation Enduring Freedom, on 2 March 2002.
- Brandenburg, Eric, Jr. – For conspicuous gallantry and intrepidity in action while serving with the 17th Air Support Operations Squadron, 18th Air Support Operations Group, in support of elements of the U.S. Army's 75th Ranger Regiment, during the opening stages of Operation Iraqi Freedom in late March and early April 2003.
- Case, Thomas – For conspicuous gallantry and intrepidity in action while serving with the 17th Air Support Operations Squadron, 18th Air Support Operations Group, in support of elements of the U.S. Army's 75th Ranger Regiment, during the opening stages of Operation Iraqi Freedom in late March and early April 2003. He was awarded a second Silver Star for actions in Afghanistan in the summer of 2009 becoming one of three Airmen in history to be awarded the SS twice for gallantry in combat.
- Covel, Earl – For gallantry in action on 18 to 19 June 2004 against an armed enemy, while serving as the Tactical Air Control Party from the 5th Air Support Operations Squadron, for Detachment Alpha 575, Company A, 3d Battalion, 5th Special Forces Group (Airborne).
- Crosby, Travis – For gallantry in connection with military operations against an armed enemy of the United States while serving with the 15th Air Support Operations Squadron, 18th Air Support Operations Group, in Support of Operation Iraqi Freedom, on 4 April 2005.
- Delaney, Tavis – For exceptional gallantry in action during a complex ambush while with the 116th Air Support Operations Squadron, in support of C Company, 1-133d Infantry Regiment, 2d Brigade Combat Team, 34th Infantry Division during Operation Enduring Freedom.
- Keehan, Michael L., III – For gallantry in connection with military operations against an armed enemy of the United States in the Republic of Iraq from 20 March 2003 to 5 April 2003. During this period, as the Battalion Air Liaison Officer, 15th Expeditionary Air Support Operations Squadron, Support 3d Squadron, 7th Cavalry Regiment.
- Kelsch, Dennis C. -17th Special Tactics Squadron, Red Team: Staff Sergeant Dennis C. Kelsch distinguished himself by gallantry in connection with military operations against an armed enemy of the United States, Combined Joint Special Operations Air Component-Afghanistan on 25 April 2018, during Operation FREEDOM’S SENTINEL in support of the RESOLUTE SUPPORT Mission.
- Lloyd, Sean W. – For conspicuous gallantry and intrepidity in action while serving with the 20th Air Support Operations Squadron in support of Operation Enduring Freedom in Afghanistan during February and March 2002.
- Mason, Eric, L. – For gallantry in action in connection with military operations against an armed enemy of the United States, while serving with the 17th Air Support Operations Squadron, during operation Enduring Freedom, in the Tangi Valley, Wardak Province, Afghanistan on 24 November 2011.
- Quesenberry, Jason – For conspicuous gallantry and intrepidity in action while serving with the 17th Air Support Operations Squadron, 18th Air Support Operations Group, in support of elements of the U.S. Army's 75th Ranger Regiment, during the opening stages of Operation Iraqi Freedom in late March and early April 2003.
- Shropshire, Michael – For gallantry in connection with military operations against an armed enemy of the United States at Abu Sukhayr, Iraq, from 20 March 2003 to 25 March 2003. During this period, as the Enlisted Terminal Attack Controller, 15th Expeditionary Air Support Operations Squadron, supporting 3d Squadron, 7th U.S. Cavalry, 3d Infantry Division Mechanized for Operation Iraqi Freedom.
- Smith, Bradley – (Posthumously) – For gallantry in connection with military operations against an armed enemy of the United States while serving with the 10th Air Support Operations Squadron, in action near Badvan village, Afghanistan, on 3 January 2010.
- Stamey, Timothy A. – For conspicuous gallantry and intrepidity in action while serving with the 18th Air Support Operations Group in support of Operation Enduring Freedom in Afghanistan, during the period 8 November 2001 to 5 January 2002.
- Vance, Kevin – For conspicuous gallantry and intrepidity in action while serving with the 17th Air Support Operations Squadron and while attached to the U.S. Army's 1st Battalion, 75th Ranger Regiment, in support of Operation Enduring Freedom in Afghanistan during Operation Anaconda on 4 March 2002.
- Whalen, Kevin – For gallantry in connection with military operations against an armed enemy of the United States while serving as a member of the Tactical Air Control Party, 116th Air Support Operations Squadron, in the Gayan Valley, Afghanistan, on 19 July 2003

== See also ==
- Tactical Air Control Party
- United States Air Force Combat Control Team
