= 24th Special Tactics Squadron =

U.S. Air Force's tier one special operations force

24th Special Tactics Squadron

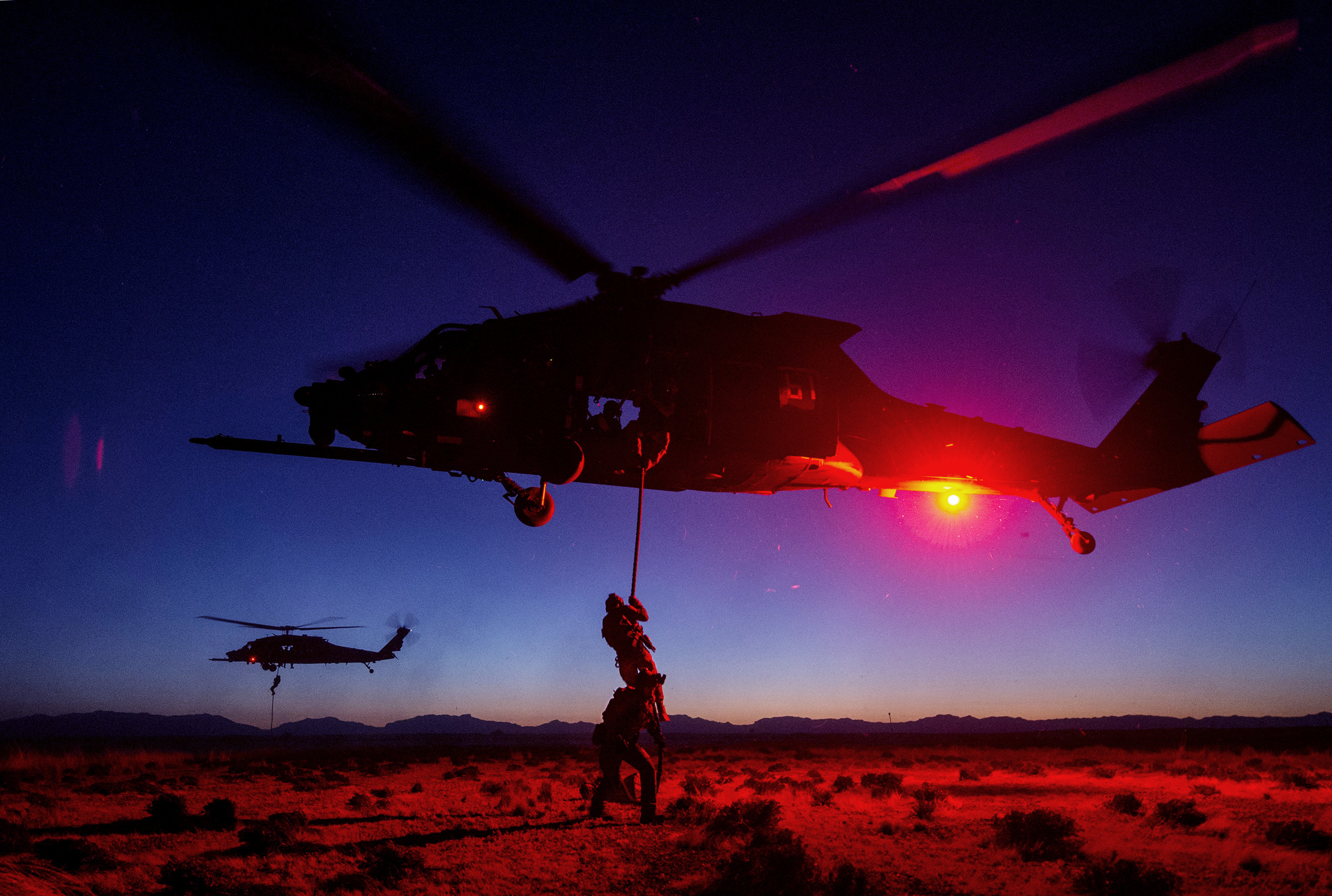
- 24th STS members complete fast rope and hoisting training during exercise Advanced Guard at Holloman Air Force Base, New Mexico, 2014
- Active: 1941–1944; 1977–present
- Country: United States
- Branch: United States Air Force
- Type: Special Mission Unit
- Part of: United States Special Operations Command; Joint Special Operations Command; Air Force Special Operations Command; 24th Special Operations Wing; 724th Special Tactics Group
- Garrison/HQ: Pope Field, North Carolina
- Engagements: Operation Eagle Claw; Operation Just Cause; Gulf War; Somali Civil War; Operation Restore Hope; Operation Gothic Serpent; Global War on Terrorism; Operation Enduring Freedom; Iraq War; Syrian Civil War; War on ISIS
- Decorations: Air Force Outstanding Unit Award with Combat "V" Device; Gallant Unit Citation; Air Force Outstanding Unit Award

Insignia
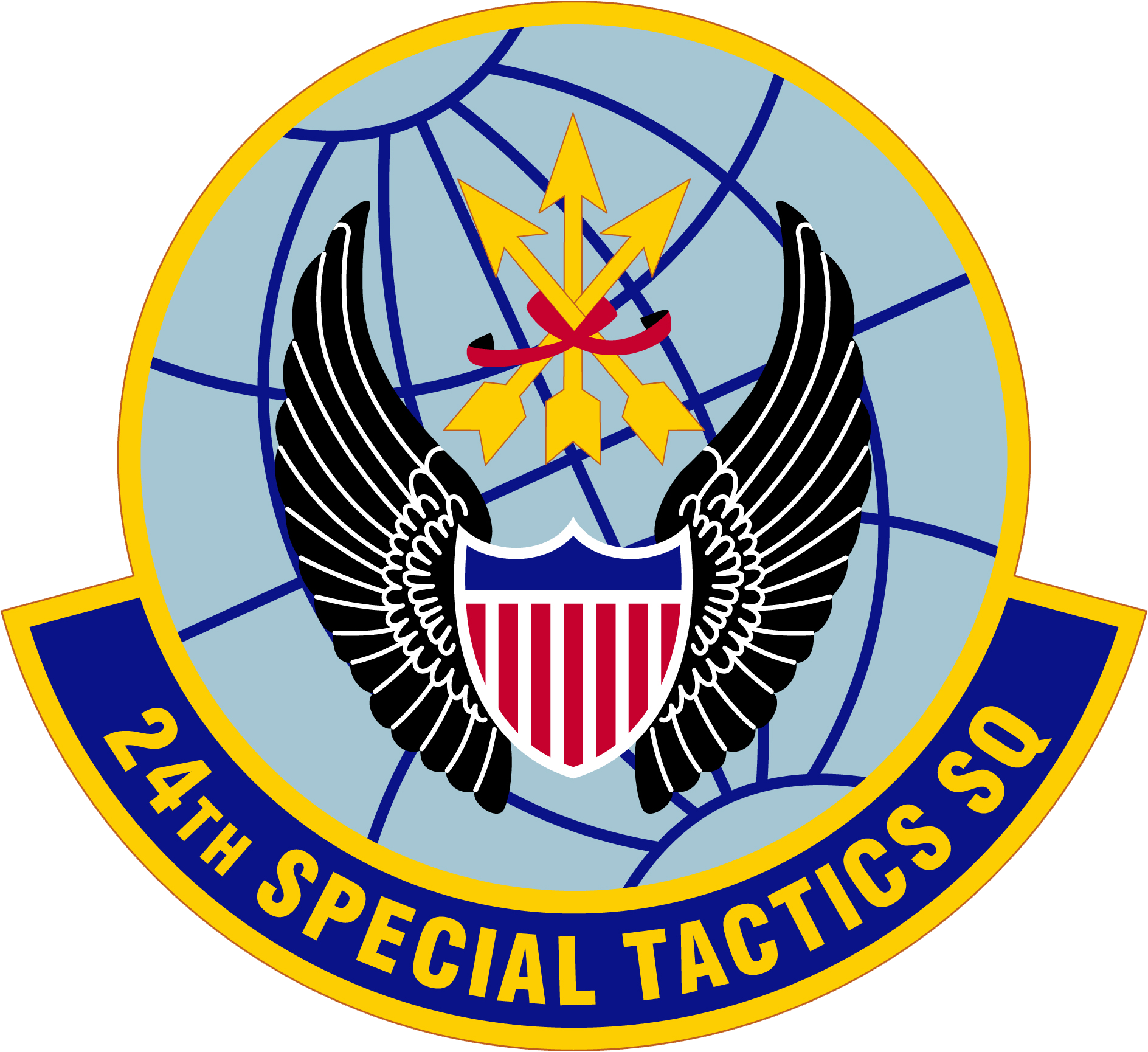
- 24th Special Tactics Squadron emblem (Approved 22 June 1990)

The 24th Special Tactics Squadron is a special tactics unit of the United States Air Force Special Operations Command (AFSOC). Garrisoned at Pope Field, North Carolina, it is the U.S. Air Force component of Joint Special Operations Command (JSOC). The unit's webpage describes it as "the Air Force's special operations ground force".

The 24th Special Tactics Squadron is one of the U.S. military's tier one special mission units that are tasked with performing the most complex, covert, and dangerous missions directed by the president of the United States and the secretary of defense.

== Organizational structure ==
- Blue Team
- Red Team
- Silver Team
- Gold Team
- Green Team (Training and Selection)

== Mission ==
As the Air Force's tier 1 unit, the 24th STS provides special operations airmen to the Joint Special Operations Command, including Pararescuemen, Combat Controllers, Special Reconnaissance, and Tactical Air Control Party personnel. 24th STS members are also trained to conduct classified and clandestine operations such as direct action, counter-terrorism, counter-insurgency, hostage rescue, and special reconnaissance.

24th STS members conduct some missions on their own, but are mostly known as enablers to the Army's 1st Special Forces Operational Detachment–Delta (a.k.a. Delta Force) and the Navy's Special Warfare Development Group, or DEVGRU (a.k.a. SEAL Team 6).

The Special Tactics Squadron is the oldest of the U.S. military's special forces groups, dating to World War II, before the U.S. military adopted a widespread special operations doctrine.

== History ==
=== World War II ===
The squadron traces its lineage to the 24th Air Corps Interceptor Control Squadron, formed in October 1941 at Hamilton Field, California. It was the director unit for the 24th Pursuit Group, which was formed simultaneously at Clark Field, Philippines, as the headquarters for pursuit squadrons of the Philippine Department Air Force.

After completing training, the squadron sailed for the Philippines on the USAT President Garfield on 6 December 1941. After the following day's Japanese attacks on Pearl Harbor and Clark Field, the President Garfield returned to port on 10 December and the squadron returned to Hamilton Field.

Although nominally assigned to the 24th Group from January to October 1942, the squadron served with air defense forces on the Pacific coast until it was disbanded on 31 March 1944, when the Army Air Forces converted its units in the United States from rigid table-of-organization units to more flexible base units. Its personnel and equipment were transferred to the 411th AAF Base Unit (Fighter Wing) at Berkeley, California.

=== Special operations ===
From 1977 to 1981, the 24th Special Tactics Squadron was called Brand X. Then it was called Det 1 MACOS (Detachment One, Military Airlift Command Operations Staff). In 1983, it was renamed Det 4 NAFCOS (Detachment Four, Numbered Air Force Combat Operations Staff). In 1987, it became 1724th Combat Control Squadron, and later in 1987, the 1724th Special Tactics Squadron. In 1992, it was renamed the 24th Special Tactics Squadron.

In 1989, the 1724th Special Tactics Squadron participated in the United States invasion of Panama. In 1993, the 24th STS deployed 11 personnel including the unit commander, Lt. Col. Jim Oeser, as part of JSOC's Task Force Ranger during Operation Restore Hope. Several airmen were decorated for providing lifesaving medical care to wounded soldiers in the 1993 Battle of Mogadishu: Pararescuemen Technical Sergeant Tim Wilkinson received the Air Force Cross and Master Sergeant Scott Fales the Silver Star. Combat Controller (CCT) SSgt. Jeffrey W. Bray received the Silver Star for coordinating helicopter attack runs throughout the night around their positions.

In September 2000, the 24th STS and the 23rd Special Tactics Squadron took part in the annual Canadian military exercise, Search and Rescue Exercise (SAREX). This was the first time Special Tactics units took part in SAREX.

The squadron was heavily involved in combat operations in Iraq and Afghanistan, where the unit was part of the JSOC groupings Task Force 121, Task Force 6-26 and Task Force 145. During Operation Rhino, two 24th STS operators were among the members of Task Force Sword that established a forward arming and refueling point (FARP) at Dalbandin, on the border with Pakistan. On November 13, an eight-man 24th STS element, supporting thirty-two Rangers from B Co., 3rd Ranger Battalion, executed a combat jump to seize a desert landing strip (LZ Bastogne). It was 24th STS's second combat jump of the war.

At LZ Bastogne, 24th STS was responsible for preparing the airstrip to receive two MC-130 Combat Talons, each ferrying two of Delta Force's AH-6 Little Bird gunships, which once unloaded, used LZ Bastogne as a FARP for their operations. 24th STS was so frequently tasked with the mission of using a penetrometer to ensure the soil could support the weight of the Combat Talons carrying Little Birds, that they did more HALO jumping than any other unit in JSOC, with at least 10 separate combat HALO jumps during the early days of the war.

In 2003, members of the unit made two combat jumps in the initial phases of the Iraq War alongside the 3rd Ranger Battalion. The first was on 24 March 2003 near the Syrian border in the Iraqi town of Al Qaim, where they secured a small desert landing strip to allow follow-on coalition forces into the area. The second combat jump was two days later near Haditha, Iraq, where they secured the Haditha Dam.

On 8 April 2003, Combat Controller Scott Sather, a member of the 24th STS, became the first airman killed in combat in Operation Iraqi Freedom, near Tikrit, Iraq. He was attached to a small team from the Regimental Reconnaissance Detachment (RRD). The RRD team and Sather were operating alongside Delta Force, under Lieutenant Colonel Pete Blaber, west of Baghdad. They were tasked with deceiving the Iraqi army into believing the main U.S. invasion was coming from the west in order to prevent Saddam Hussein from escaping into Syria. Sather Air Base was named after him.

The 24th STS was a part of JSOC's Task Force 145 which was a provisional grouping charged with hunting down high-value al-Qaeda and Iraqi leaders, including Al-Qaeda in Iraq leader Abu Musab al-Zarqawi, who was killed in June 2006.

In 2011, the squadron lost three members – PJs John Brown and Daniel Zerbe and CCT Andrew Harvell – when the Chinook in which they were flying was shot down in Afghanistan. To honor them, 18 members of AFSOC marched 800 miles from Lackland Air Force Base, San Antonio, Texas to Hurlburt Field, Florida.

== Notable members ==
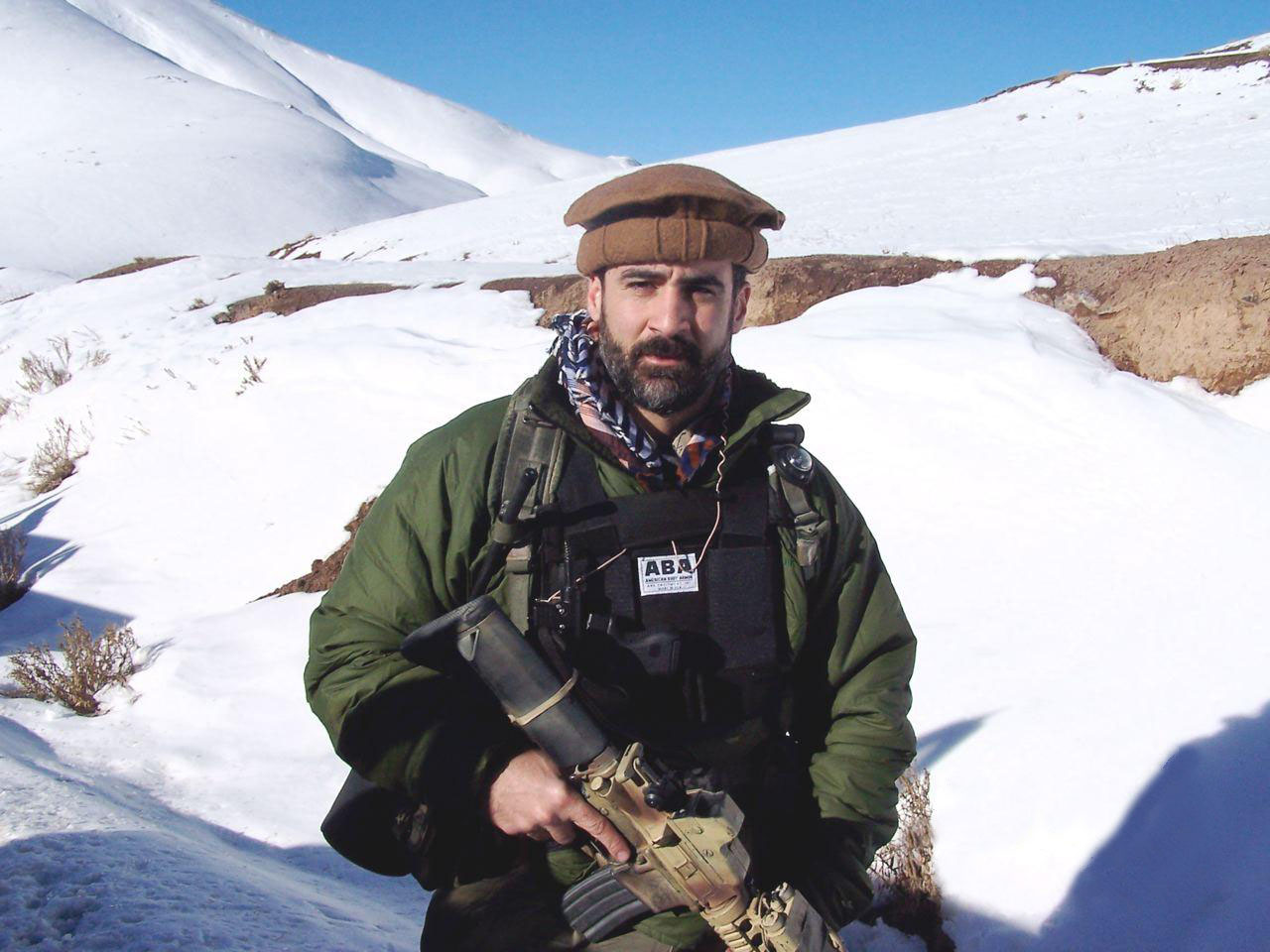
Ramón Colón-López in Afghanistan as a member of the 24th STS, 2004

- PJ Tim Wilkinson received the Air Force Cross for his actions during the 1993 Battle of Mogadishu. Wilkinson was portrayed by Ty Burrell in the 2001 film Black Hawk Down, which chronicled the events of the Battle of Mogadishu.
- CCT John Chapman was posthumously awarded the Air Force Cross, later upgraded to the Medal of Honor. He is the first US Air Force member to receive the Medal of Honor since the Vietnam Era, for his actions in the Battle of Takur Ghar during the War in Afghanistan. In 2005 a U.S. Navy Buffalo Soldier-class container ship was renamed the TSgt John A. Chapman in Chapman's honor. It took 16 years for him to be awarded one, due in large part to the Navy SEALs' attempts to block his Medal of Honor.
- PJ Ramón Colón-López, a former Senior Enlisted Advisor to the Chairman of the Joint Chiefs of Staff, was a member of the 24th STS twice. From February 1999 to January 2005, Colón-López was a Special Tactics Element Leader and from April 2009 to April 2011 he was the Squadron's Senior Enlisted Advisor. In 2007, Colón-López was one of the first six recipients of the newly created Air Force Combat Action Medal. He was awarded the AFCAM for a 2004 operation in Afghanistan during which he led an Advance Force Operations Team.

== Lineage ==
24th Fighter Control Squadron

- Constituted as the 24th Air Corps Interceptor Control Squadron on 14 October 1941

Activated on 21 October 1941

- Redesignated 24th Fighter Control Squadron on 15 May 1942
- Disbanded on 31 March 1944

24th Special Tactics Squadron

- Designated as the 1724th Combat Control Squadron on 1 May 1987
- Redesignated 1724th Special Tactics Squadron on 1 October 1987
- Reconstituted and consolidated with the 1724th Special Tactics Squadron on 1 March 1992
- Consolidated with the 24th Fighter Control Squadron on 1 March 1992
- Redesignated 24th Special Tactics Squadron on 31 March 1992

=== Assignments ===
- Fourth Air Force, 21 October 1941
- 24th Pursuit Group, 15 January 1942 (apparently attached to Fourth Air Force until 7 July 1942, then to IV Fighter Command)
- San Francisco Air Defense Wing (later San Francisco Fighter Wing), 15 October 1942 – 31 March 1944
- Twenty-Third Air Force, 1 May 1987
- 1720th Special Tactics Group (later 720th Special Tactics Group), 1 October 1987
- 724th Special Tactics Group, 29 April 2011 – present

=== Stations ===
- Hamilton Field, California, 21 October 1941 (aboard the USAT President Garfield, 6–10 December 1941)
- Berkeley, California, 7 October 1943 – 31 March 1944
- Pope Air Force Base (later Pope Field), North Carolina, 1 May 1987 – present

=== Unit Awards ===
Award streamer	Award	Dates	Notes
	Air Force Outstanding Unit Award with Combat "V" Device	18 December 1989 – 16 January 1990	Operation Just Cause
	Air Force Outstanding Unit Award with Combat "V" Device	16 August – 7 November 1993	Battle of Mogadishu
	Air Force Outstanding Unit Award with Combat "V" Device	1 September 2001 – 31 August 2003	
	Air Force Gallant Unit Citation	1 January 2006 – 31 December 2007	
	Air Force Outstanding Unit Award	8 November 1993 – 31 July 1995	
	Air Force Outstanding Unit Award	1 August 1995 – 31 July 1997	
	Air Force Outstanding Unit Award	5 August 1997 – 31 July 1999	
	Air Force Outstanding Unit Award	1 September 1999 – 31 August 2001	

Other

- Air Commando Association 2012 AFSOC Squadron of the Year

== Commanders ==
- July 2003 – July 2005, Lt. Col. Mark F. Stratton
- June 2005 – June 2007, Lt. Col. Robert G. Armfield – Previous 24th STS assignments: Director of Operations (January 1998 – July 2002)
- June 2009 – April 2011, Lt. Col. Matthew Wolfe Davidson – Previous 24th STS assignments: Flight Commander (August 1998 – January 2002), Deputy Commander (June 2008 – June 2009)

== See also ==
- List of United States Air Force special tactics squadrons
