= Battle of Do Ab =

War in Afghanistan event

- Part of the War in Afghanistan (2001–2021)
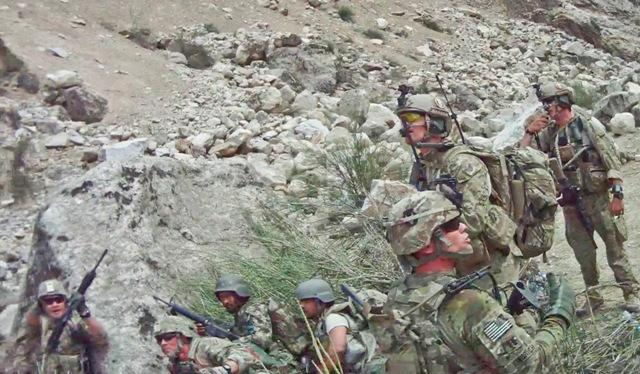
- US and Afghan troops during the battle
Date	25 May 2011
Location	Nuristan province, Afghanistan
Result	Coalition victory

Belligerents
Coalition forces, including: United States; Islamic Republic of Afghanistan	(Afghanistan) Taliban

Commanders and leaders
(United States) Major General John Campbell, Captain Garrett Gingrich C-133 INF, 1LT Justin Foote 133 INF, Major Heidi Lesh	Unknown

Strength
50 troops (approximate); 14 aircraft	300+ insurgents

Casualties and losses
None	270 killed (US estimate)

The Battle of Do Ab took place on Nuristan province, Afghanistan on 25 May 2011. In the battle, a scout platoon from the 1st Battalion, 133rd Infantry Regiment, United States Army, 6 MARSOC special forces officers, 20 Afghan soldiers, and two United States Air Force Tactical Air Control Party (TACP) operators and one Law Enforcement Professional (LEP) retired police officer were ambushed by an estimated 400-500 Taliban near the village of Do Ab. With assistance from close air support, the coalition forces repulsed the ambush, killing approximately 270 Taliban. The coalition forces suffered no casualties. Three Purple Hearts were awarded. Heidi Lesh, Toka Ohilips, Jake Miller. The JTACs (TACP) were awarded the Silver star (Delaney) and the Bronze Star with Valor (McCaffrey).

== Battle ==
After receiving reports of Taliban fighters massing to attack Forward Operating Base Kalagush, a scout platoon from the 1st Battalion, 133rd Infantry Regiment, plus 20 Afghan soldiers and two US Air Force TACPs, and one Law Enforcement Professional (LEP) were airlifted by a pair of Chinook helicopters to a small landing zone in a canyon near the village of Do Ab. Unknown to the coalition troops, several hundred Taliban had surrounded the small landing zone and prepared an ambush. That morning, as soon as the helicopters landed the troops were attacked from all sides.

The troops returned fire while the two TACPs radioed for air support. Throughout the day, airstrikes by US Air Force F-16s, F-15s, and AC-130 gunships, US Navy Super Hornets, and US Army AH-64 Apaches and OH-58 Kiowas prevented the Taliban from overrunning the coalition forces. An MC-12 aircraft provided command and control support and relayed the air support requests from the TACP, as the high canyon walls interfered with radio communications from the ground. Later in the day, Chinooks delivered a half team of U.S. special operations forces and Afghan commandos to support the surrounded Coalition troops.

When night fell, the surviving Taliban halted the attack and attempted to retire from the battlefield. Two AC-130s, equipped with infrared equipment, hunted the retreating Taliban and attempted to kill them all. In total, the United States estimated that 270 of the Taliban were killed.

== Aftermath ==
After the battle in May 2011, Afghan and Coalition forces did not attempt to regain control of Nuristan province, which remained under Taliban control. Instead, Coalition forces conducted periodic sweeps or raids in the province to cull the numbers of occupying Taliban militants. A joint Afghan/Coalition operation in the Barg-e-Matal district of Nuristan in September 2011, for example, killed an estimated 70 Taliban fighters.
