= List of United States Air Force aerial port squadrons =

This article lists the aerial port squadrons of the United States Air Force. The purpose of an aerial port squadron is to arrange and carry out Air Force logistical functions such as processing cargo, loading equipment, rigging for airdrop, and packing parachutes.

== Aerial port squadrons ==
Aerial Port Squadrons
Squadron	Emblem	Location	Note
1st Aerial Port Squadron		Dyess AFB	Activated in 1952 as 1st Aerial Port Operations Squadron
2nd Aerial Port Squadron		Little Rock AFB	Activated in 1952 as 2d Aerial Port Operations Squadron
3rd Aerial Port Squadron		Pope AFB	Activated in 1953 as 3d Aerial Port Operations Squadron
4th Aerial Port Squadron		Langley AFB	Activated in 1953 as 4th Aerial Port Operations Squadron
5th Aerial Port Squadron		Evreux AB, France	Activated in 1953 as 5th Aerial Port Operations Squadron
5th Aerial Port Squadron		RAF Mildenhall, United Kingdom	
6th Aerial Port Squadron		U-Tapao RTAFB, Thailand	Activated in 1954 as 6th Aerial Port Operations Squadron
7th Aerial Port Squadron		Ashiya AB, Japan; Tachikawa AB, Japan; Naha AB, Okinawa; Kunsan AB, Korea	Activated on 7 Feb 1955, replaced 6127th Air Terminal Group (FEAF). Stations: Ashiya AB, Japan, 7 Feb 1955; Tachikawa AB, Japan, 1 Jul 1956; Naha AB, Okinawa, 8 Mar 1966; Kunsan AB, Korea, 30 Jun 1971 – 1 Nov 1973. Six detachments in Southeast Asia were realigned under 8th Aerial Port Squadron in 1963. Inactivated on 1 Nov 1973.
8th Aerial Port Squadron		Tan Son Nhut AB, South Vietnam	
9th Aerial Port Squadron		Forbes AFB	
10th Aerial Port Squadron		Dyess AFB	
11th Aerial Port Squadron		Mitchel AFB	Activated in the reserves in 1954 as 11th Aerial Port Operations Squadron
12th Aerial Port Squadron		Pittsburgh, PA	Activated in the reserves in 1954 as 12th Aerial Port Operations Squadron
13th Aerial Port Squadron		O'Hare International Airport	Activated in the reserves in 1954 as 13th Aerial Port Operations Squadron
14th Aerial Port Squadron		Cam Ranh Bay AB, South Viet Nam	Activated in the reserves in 1954 as 14th Aerial Port Operations Squadron
15th Aerial Port Squadron		Da Nang AB, South Viet Nam	Activated in the reserves in 1954 as 15th Aerial Port Operations Squadron
16th Aerial Port Squadron		Bakalar AFB	Later 16th Mobile Aerial Port Flight at Elmendorf AFB
18th Aerial Port Squadron		Pope Field	
25th Aerial Port Squadron		Maxwell AFB	
26th Aerial Port Squadron		Kelly AFB	
27th Aerial Port Squadron		Minneapolis-Saint Paul ARS	
28th Aerial Port Squadron		O'Hare Air Reserve Forces Facility	
29th Mobile Aerial Port Squadron		Selfridge Air National Guard Base	(Later 29th Aerial Port Flight)
30th Aerial Port Squadron		Niagara Falls Air Reserve Station	
31st Aerial Port Squadron		NAS Willow Grove	
32d Aerial Port Squadron	32d Aerial Port Squadron patch	Pittsburgh IAP Air Reserve Station	
33d Aerial Port Squadron		Andrews AFB	
34th Aerial Port Squadron		General Mitchell ANGB	
35th Aerial Port Squadron		Joint Base McGuire-Dix-Lakehurst	
36th Aerial Port Squadron		McChord AFB	
37th Aerial Port Squadron		March AFB	
38th Aerial Port Squadron		Charleston AFB	U.S. Air Force Reserve Unit.
39th Aerial Port Squadron		Peterson AFB	
40th Aerial Port Squadron		Rickenbacker ANGB	Inactivated 1992
41st Aerial Port Squadron		Keesler AFB	
42d Aerial Port Squadron		Westover ARB	
43d Aerial Port Squadron		Bergstrom AFB	
43d Aerial Port Squadron		Kelly AFB	
43d Aerial Port Squadron		Pope AFB	(Later reorganized into the 43d Air Mobility Squadron)
44th Aerial Port Squadron		Andersen AFB	
45th Aerial Port Squadron		Travis AFB	
46th Aerial Port Squadron		Dover AFB	
47th Aerial Port Squadron		Travis AFB	
48th Aerial Port Squadron		Hickam AFB	
49th Aerial Port Squadron		Grissom ARB	
50th Aerial Port Squadron		March ARB	
51st Aerial Port Squadron		Charleston AFB	
52d Aerial Port Squadron		McChord AFB	
52d Aerial Port Squadron		McChord AFB	
53d Aerial Port Squadron		Pope AFB	
54th Aerial Port Squadron		Norton AFB	
55th Aerial Port Squadron		Travis AFB	
56th Aerial Port Squadron		March ARB	
57th Aerial Port Squadron		Hanscom AFB	
58th Aerial Port Squadron		Westover ARB	
59th Aerial Port Squadron		Westover ARB	
60th Aerial Port Squadron		Travis AFB	
61st Aerial Port Squadron		Norton AFB	
62d Aerial Port Squadron		McChord AFB	
63d Aerial Port Squadron		Norton AFB	
64th Aerial Port Squadron		Hamilton AFB Naval Station Treasure Island	
65th Aerial Port Squadron		McClellan AFB	
66th Aerial Port Squadron		McClellan AFB	
67th Aerial Port Squadron		Hill AFB	
68th Aerial Port Squadron		Hill AFB	
69th Aerial Port Squadron		Andrews AFB	
70th Aerial Port Squadron		Homestead ARB	
71st Aerial Port Squadron		Tinker AFB	
71st Aerial Port Squadron		Langley AFB	
72d Aerial Port Squadron		Tinker AFB	
73d Aerial Port Squadron		NAS JRB Fort Worth - Carswell Field	
74th Aerial Port Squadron		Lackland AFB/Kelly Field	
75th Aerial Port Squadron		Carswell AFB	
76th Aerial Port Squadron		Youngstown ARS	
77th Aerial Port Squadron		Richards-Gebaur AFB	
78th Aerial Port Squadron		Richards-Gebaur AFB	
79th Aerial Port Squadron		Dobbins ARB	
80th Aerial Port Squadron		Dobbins ARB	
81st Aerial Port Squadron		Charleston AFB	U.S. Air Force Reserve
82d Aerial Port Squadron		Travis AFB	
83d Aerial Port Squadron		Portland International Airport	
84th Aerial Port Squadron		Donaldson AFB	
85th Aerial Port Squadron		Hanscom AFB	
86th Aerial Port Squadron		McChord AFB	
87th Aerial Port Squadron		McClellan AFB	
87th Aerial Port Squadron		Wright-Patterson AFB	
88th Aerial Port Squadron		McGuire AFB	
89th Aerial Port Squadron		JB Andrews	
90th Aerial Port Squadron		Homestead AFB	
91st Aerial Port Squadron		O'Hare Air Reserve Forces Facility	
92d Aerial Port Squadron		Willow Grove ARS	
93d Aerial Port Squadron		Andrews AFB	
94th Aerial Port Squadron		Robins AFB	
95th Aerial Port Squadron		440th Airlift Wing	
96th Aerial Port Squadron		Richards-Gebaur AFB	
96th Aerial Port Squadron		Little Rock AFB	
105th Aerial Port Squadron		Stewart ANGB	
130th Mobile Aerial Port Squadron		Yeager ANGB	
136th Mobile Aerial Port Squadron		Carswell Field	
137th Aerial Port Squadron		Will Rogers World Airport	
143d Aerial Port Squadron		Quonset Point, RI	
164th Aerial Port Squadron		Memphis ANGB	
165th Aerial Port Squadron		Savannah Air National Guard Base	
167th Aerial Port Squadron		Eastern West Virginia Regional Airport	
176th Mobile Aerial Port Flight		Kulis ANGB	
305th Aerial Port Squadron		McGuire AFB	
313th Aerial Port Squadron		RAF Mildenhall	
314th Aerial Port Squadron		Little Rock AFB	
316th Aerial Port Squadron		Yokota AB	
374th Aerial Port Squadron		Clark AB	
435th Aerial Port Squadron		Rhein Main AB	
436th Aerial Port Squadron		Dover AFB	
437th Aerial Port Squadron		Charleston AFB	
438th Aerial Port Squadron		McGuire AFB	
603d Aerial Port Squadron		Kadena AB	
608th Aerial Port Squadron		Ramstein AB	
611th Aerial Port Squadron		Osan Air Base	Under the 611th Military Airlift Support Group, later the 731st Air Mobility Squadron
616th Aerial Port Squadron		Elmendorf AFB	
621st Aerial Port Squadron		McGuire AFB	
624th Aerial Port Squadron		Clark AB	
625th Aerial Port Squadron		Torrejon AB	
721st Aerial Port Squadron		Ramstein AB	

== See also ==
- List of United States Air Force squadrons
