= 17th Special Tactics Squadron =

Unit of the United States Air Force

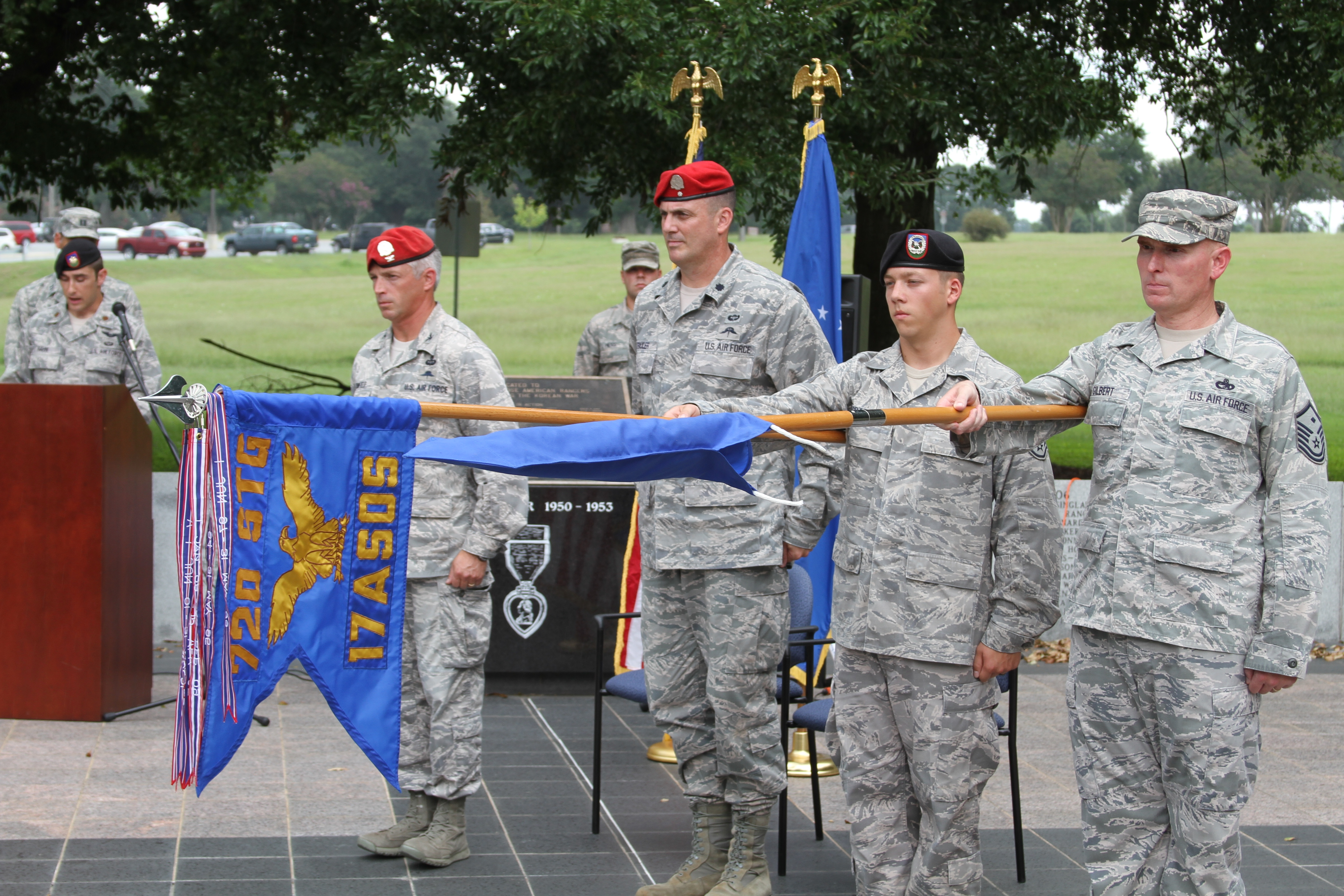
- Redesignation ceremony of the 17th ASOS as the 17th STS on 8 August 2013 at Fort Benning
- Active: 1994–present
- Country: United States of America
- Branch: United States Air Force
- Role: Special Operations
- Part of: Air Force Special Operations Command; 24th Special Operations Wing; 724th Special Tactics Group
- Garrison/HQ: Fort Benning, Georgia
- Motto: Ex Id Aer Pro Id Terra (Latin: "Of the Air for the Ground")
- Decorations: Air Force Outstanding Unit Award with Combat "V" Device; Gallant Unit Citation; Air Force Meritorious Unit Award; Air Force Outstanding unit Award

Insignia
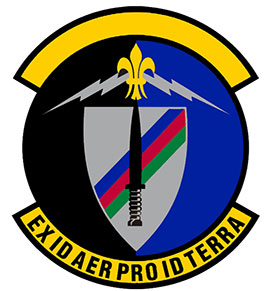
- 17th Special Tactics Squadron emblem (approved 6 June 1996)

The 17th Special Tactics Squadron is one of the ten Special Tactics Squadrons of United States Air Force Special Operations Command. It is garrisoned at Fort Benning, Georgia.

== Overview ==
Special Tactics operators with the 17th STS, 24th Special Operations Wing, Air Force Special Operations Command, deploy with special operations forces to provide joint terminal attack control and maximize the impact of air power by controlling and directing precise strikes to destroy the enemy. The squadron's primary mission is to provide special tactics Tactical Air Control Party Specialists (TACP) to the Army's 75th Ranger Regiment for unconventional operations.

== Organization ==
The 17th STS is made up of a headquarters unit and two operational detachments. The headquarters unit is stationed at Fort Benning, Georgia. Detachment 1 (Red Team) is stationed at Hunter Army Airfield, Georgia and is attached to 1st Battalion, 75th Ranger Regiment. Detachment 2 (Silver Team) is stationed at Fort Lewis, Washington and is attached to the 2d Battalion, 75th Ranger Regiment.

The squadron is primarily made up of TACP airmen. In addition to the TACPs in the unit, there are special reconnaissance airmen, combat controllers, special tactics officers, and combat mission support airmen.

Each detachment consists of 13 TACPs and one Tactical Air Control Party officer (TACP-O).

They have access to weaponry such as the MK46, M4, MK18, MK17, MK20, and sidearms such as the M9, Glock 19, and M17.

== Lineage ==
- Constituted as the 17th Air Support Operations Squadron on 24 June 1994

Activated on 1 July 1994

- Redesignated 17th Special Tactics Squadron on 8 August 2013

=== Assignments ===
- 18th Air Support Operations Group 1 July 1994
- 720th Special Tactics Group 1 October 2008 – 30 September 2020
- 724th Special Tactics Group 1 October 2020 – present

=== Stations ===
- Fort Benning, Georgia, 1 July 1994 – present

== See also ==
- List of United States Air Force special tactics squadrons
