= Air Transportation Specialist =

United States Air Force cargo service staff

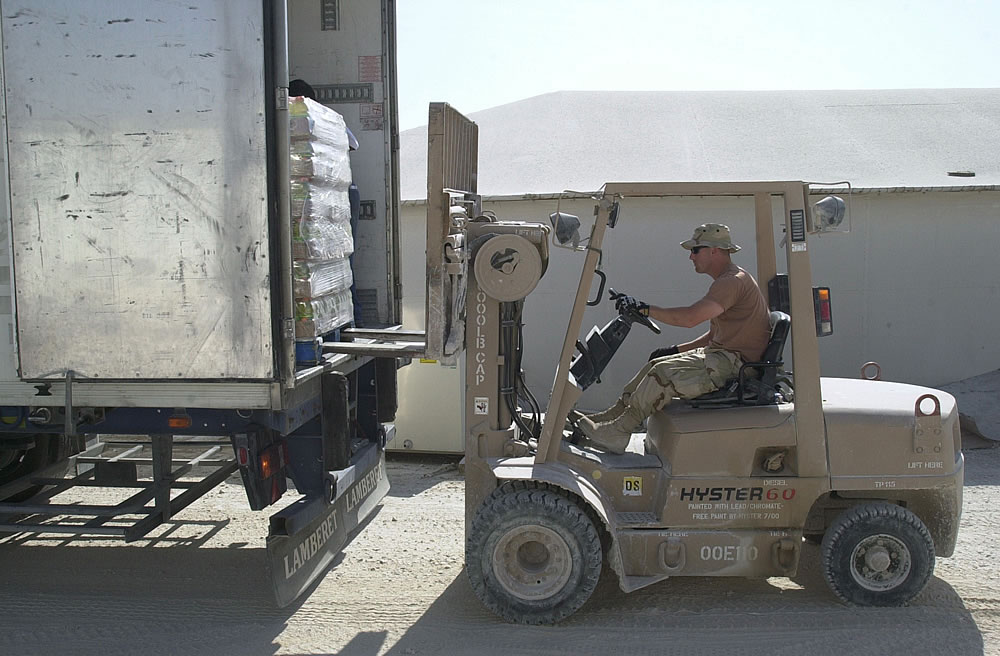
Airman unloading a truck with forklift.

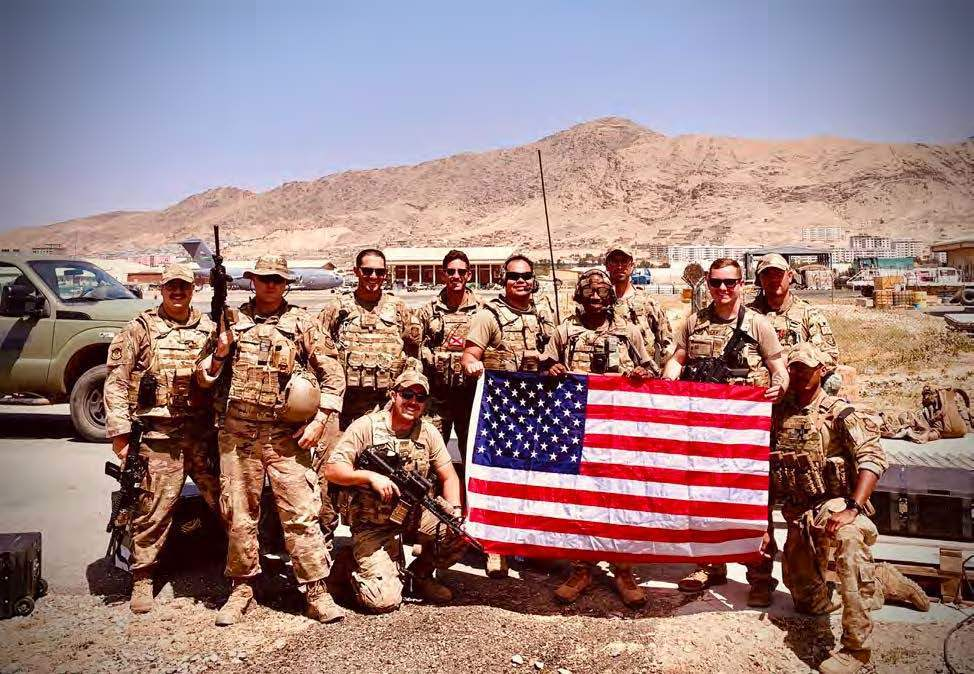
Airfield operators, maintainers and air transportation specialists pose with the U.S. flag at Kabul International Airport during Operation Allies Refuge.

Air transportation specialists are members of the United States Air Force and responsible for inspecting, documenting, packaging, loading and unloading cargo on aircraft.

== Job description ==
The duties of an Air transportation specialist include:

- inspecting cargo and mail offered for airlift to verify eligibility and proper documentation, packaging, and marking,
- determining quantity and type of cargo to be loaded according to allowable aircraft cabin load,
- selecting and palletizing loads,
- coordinating with air transportation clearance authority on diversion of cargo,
- loading and unloading aircraft using materials handling and loading equipment,
- checking cargo against manifests,
- annotating overage, shortage, or damage,
- preparing and maintaining forms for passenger travel,
- preparing weight and balance records,
- requisitioning, storing, and issuing expendable and nonexpendable items for use on aircraft,
- reviewing travel authorizations for validity and accuracy and checking in passengers and baggage.

== External links and references ==
- Air Force Specialty Book
- Air Force Reserve article
