= Battles of Nakhang =

- Part of Laotian Civil War; Vietnam War
Date	16 February 1966 – 28 February 1969
Location	Northern Laos
Result	1st battle: North Vietnamese victory 2nd battle: Royal Lao victory 3rd battle: Royal Lao victory 4th battle: North Vietnamese victory
Territorial changes	Nakhang captured by the North Vietnamese

Belligerents
Kingdom of Laos; Supported by United States; Thailand	North Vietnam	Forces Armee Neutralistes

Commanders and leaders
(Kingdom of Laos) Vang Pao (WIA) (United States) William H. Sullivan (United States) Ramon D. Horinek (United States) Eagle (United States) Charles Larimore Jones (United States) Eugene O. Conley (United States) Robert E. Turner (United States) John D. Haney (United States) John Smith Hamilton	Unknown	3 unknown officers

Units involved
(Kingdom of Laos) Five Royal Lao Army battalions (Kingdom of Laos) Three Auto Defense Choc picket lines (Kingdom of Laos) (United States) AC-47 Spookys (United States) Forward air controllers (United States) F-105s (United States) Air America transports (United States) A-1 Skyraiders from the 602nd Air Commando Squadron (United States) A-26 Invaders from the 606th Air Commando Squadron (United States) One A-130; 20th Special Operations Squadron (Thailand) Thai air support (Thailand) Thai advisers	(North Vietnam) 5th Battalion, 168th Regiment (North Vietnam) 174th Regiment of the 316th Division	Battalion Infantry 5

Strength
(Kingdom of Laos) 5,120 (United States) Additional air support (Thailand) Thai advisers	Total unknown First battle: Peaked at 600 to 1,000; Third battle: 600 to 800	Unknown

Casualties and losses
Total unknown First battle: Slight; Second battle: At least 10; Third battle: 9 killed, 24 wounded Fourth battle: Very heavy, 50 percent killed of two battalions, over 50 percent killed of three battalions. Thai advisers killed, one captured.	Total unknown, but heavy. One North Vietnamese captured First battle: Heavy, at least 70 killed with upper estimate of 1,000; Second battle: Heavy; Third battle: Estimated 250 killed Fourth battle: 26 killed	Three officers executed, battalion members killed or defect to North Vietnam

The Battles of Nakhang (16 February 1966–28 February 1969) were fought between Royalist forces and North Vietnamese invaders for control of the northern base of Nakhang, Laos. The Lima Site 36 airstrip at Nakhang was capable of handling aircraft up to the size of C-123 cargo carriers; its location and length made it a vital component of the Royalist defense. Lima Site 36 was the airhead for their guerrillas' movements and resupply, as well as a staging point for U.S. combat search and rescue helicopters.

The People's Army of Vietnam (PAVN) first attacked Nakhang from 16–19 February 1966. They successfully overcame an aerial bombardment that razed both the village and the airfield's equipment. Though successful in this First Battle of Nakhang, the PAVN lost Nakhang again on 25 May 1966, as a Royalist counter-offensive attacked behind a screen of tactical air strikes. Once re-established there, the Royalist troops fanned out throughout northern Laos, even unto the border of the Democratic Republic of Vietnam.

On 6 January 1967, the PAVN renewed their offensive for the Third Battle of Nakhang. Despite their taking advantage of an overcast they thought would prevent aerial support, they were defeated within two days by U.S. Air Force airstrikes. It was not until 28 February 1969 that the Vietnamese succeeded in capturing Lima Site 36 for good, with their surprise assault of the Fourth Battle of Nakhang.

== Background ==
When the United States decided to underwrite the Royal Lao Government and the Royal Lao Armed Forces in 1953, it entered into what burgeoned into the Laotian Civil War.

Its northerly location and its airfield made Nakhang, Laos a major base for the Royal Lao Government's military operations against the PAVN and the Pathet Lao (PL). The base itself menaced the Communist-held Route 6 supply line. The U.S. Air Force (USAF) stationed its Jolly Green Giants there, using it as a forward base for combat search and rescue for American air crews. The airstrip, with 700 unpaved meters of runway, could accept Air America C-123 Providers, as well as smaller craft. The airstrip's thinner air at 1,340 meters altitude and lack of navigational aids made it hazardous to use. Landings were a one-shot deal on final approach, with a hill at the northeast end of the strip blocking any pullouts for second attempts. Nevertheless, its vital forward location near the Communist stronghold of Houaphanh Province served as an air bridge for stocking the airfield and resupplying Royalist guerrillas.

As early as 1964, Hmong General Vang Pao established a number of guerrilla bases around Nakhang, using it to import needed materiel for his burgeoning "Secret Army". At about the time the United States began Operation Rolling Thunder, Nakhang's activities surged. During June 1965, the first two U. S. air advisers were posted to Vang Pao at Nakhang for six months. One of them, Captain John Teague, was the son of Congressman Olin Teague. Also stationed there were half a dozen Royal Thai Air Force majors serving as forward air controllers.

As a result of increasing Royalist activity, there were a series of skirmishes between the sides for possession of the outlying positions surrounding Nakhang throughout 1964 and 1965. In July 1965, Nakhang was the launching point for a successful offensive against Communist forces in the vicinity. By late November, Vang Pao had five weak Royal Lao Army (RLA) battalions to defend the entire north of Military Region 2. He reinforced them by posting three picket lines of Auto Defense Choc (ADC) skirmishers to screen any PAVN approaches. The five battalions plus the ADC militia troops numbered 5,120 strong. Another 5,500 Auto-Defense Ordinaire home guards were alerted in villages throughout the region.

== First battle of Nakhang ==
On 15 January 1966, the PAVN high command dispatched 5th Battalion, 168th Regiment from North Vietnam to assault Nakhang, which was garrisoned by a single Royalist battalion. By mid-February, they had crossed into Laos and were poised to attack. They were under orders to disregard casualties, and to capture Nakhang regardless of cost. At 2330 hours 16 February 1966, the battalion, now swollen to 600 to 1,000 troops, overran an outpost 1.6 kilometers south of Nakhang. By dawn, the attackers were shelling Nakhang with mortars. Return Royalist howitzer fire drove the PAVN attack back onto high ground southeast of Nakhang. An AC-47 Spooky gunship responded, dropping flares and firing on Communist troops near the overrun outpost.

Later on 17 February, a Butterfly Forward Air Controller, U.S. Air Force Captain Ramon Horinek, found a civilian pilot to fly him over the battlefield. Although their plane was hit three times by small arms fire while taking off, they succeeded in directing tactical air strikes on the previously captured Lima Site 27. Upon return to Nakhang's Lima Site 36, that airstrip was under mortar attack. As friendly forces marked Communist positions with smoke shells, Horinek called in USAF strikes to suppress ground fire and allow a landing despite being hit twice more. Captain Horinek then set up a ground control station and directed tactical air strikes all day with the aid of an airborne forward air controller, call sign Eagle. Seven sorties of F-105 tactical air suppressed the mortars while setting fire to the local village.

By order of the Ambassador, at 1730 hours 17 February the Americans at Nakhang evacuated to nearby Lima Site 48 Alternate for the night for safety's sake.

A determined attack hit Nakhang at 0430 hours 18 February. Dawn found the Communists infiltrated within 25 meters of Royal Lao Army defenders. Eagle FAC had returned and directed four sorties of close air support south and southwest of the airstrip. Horinek tried to have himself flown in, but was diverted by cratering of the runway. He helicoptered in to the RLA command post north of the city. From there, he led a sweep along the north end of the runway, personally capturing the only PAVN prisoner of the battle.

General Vang Pao flew in to congratulate Horinek. The Communists hastily attacked, and wounded the general. He was medevaced to Korat Royal Thai Air Force Base, the departing helicopter being hit five times. With their charismatic leader gone, Royalist guerrilla morale sank drastically.

With the Royalist forces in dire straits, napalm was used for the first time in Laos. Directed by an airborne controller, Puppy Love 15, the incendijel was first dropped southwest of the runway to suppress Communist fire. At 1545 hours, a second drop northwest of the airstrip provided fiery cover for the Royalist withdrawal. By 1610 hours, all RLA forces had evacuated Nakhang, and air strikes began destroying abandoned equipment while striking the advancing enemy. Horinek called in close air support until he boarded the last departing helicopter. Two USAF AC-47 gunships dispatched from Udorn arrived too late to prevent the retreat. By 19 February, Nakhang was devastated, with little of value left for the Communists. It had been bombed, rocketed, and strafed by 165 sorties of U.S. tactical air power.

Captain Ramon D. Horinek received the Air Force Cross for his exploits during the first Battle of Nakhang.

== Interim operations ==
Royalists casualties were few, as the guerrillas had withdrawn timely. The Hmong guerrillas had served to attract the concentration of Communist troops, making them a worthwhile target for tactical air power. The guerrillas withdrew to nearby Moung Hiem; this Lima Site was held by Forces Armee Neutralistes Bataillon Infanterie 5 (BI 5). They had a tacit nonaggression pact with the PAVN.

Captain Horinek had counted 70 Communists killed by air in one single rice paddy at Nakhang. When questioned, a local villager described a Communist column burdened with wounded and dead taking six hours to straggle by him. Another villager estimated 1,000 Communist dead. The American conclusion was that though the PAVN had captured Nakhang, they had suffered so severely they had lost the battle. They did not occupy the site until 21 February.

Having been unwelcomed at Moung Hiem, and noting that Neutralist soldiers were beginning to desert as the PAVN approached, the guerrillas withdrew back towards Nakhang to evade the oncoming enemy. On 11 March, the PAVN overran the encampment full of cooperative Neutralists, executing its three officers. BI 5 dissolved as some soldiers were killed and other volunteered to join the Communists. The Communist drive also struck some nearby smaller Lima Sites. However, the onset of monsoon rain thwarted any PAVN opportunity to attack the Neutralists holding the crucial forward fighter base at Moung Soui. The Communists were forced to recede upon their supply lines from Vietnam as the rains began.

== Second battle of Nakhang ==
Vang Pao returned to duty a month after being wounded. He promptly planned to retake Nakhang, using his guerrilla forces without aid from the RLA regulars. The guerrillas moved into the assault mode in early May 1966. The Royalists walked into a vacated Moung Hiem to find unburied skeletons of Neutralist soldiers. A Royalist column left there to occupy Moung Son. A second column attacked Nakhang and met heavy resistance. For the next two days, Butterfly FAC Charles Larimore Jones directed tactical air strikes on the Communists in Nakhang. Meanwhile, Hmong guerrillas from Moung Hiem were being ferried to a hill southeast of Nakhang. One of the Air America helicopters was shot down in flames on 19 May, killing the pilot and nine partisans. On the 23rd, Jones circled above the battle as the Communists were slowly forced from Nakhang. Most of the retreating Communists were caught in an open field; a flight of U.S. jets inflicted widespread casualties. The Royalist guerrillas recaptured Nakhang on 25 May 1966.

Taking advantage of the air mobility offered by Air America's helicopters, the guerrillas fanned out from Nakhang, even to the Vietnamese border, retaking old Lima Sites. Meanwhile, the PAVN had withdrawn into North Vietnam for refitting. Vang Pao seeded road watch teams near the Vietnamese border to track their movements, and three Thai forward air guides to call in air strikes upon any Communists spotted.

== Third battle of Nakhang ==
In December 1966, PAVN troops in Xam Neua accumulated into a force capable of attacking Nakhang, Lima Site 85, or Lima Site 52. When they chose to assault Nakhang, they changed from their usual night attack tactics. Choosing to infiltrate by night and attack at dawn, 600 to 800 PAVN troops nearly succeeded in a surprise raid on 6 January 1967. However, a brush with a Royalist outpost at 0600 hours brought on the battle. With an overcast of 500 meters or lower, and mountain peaks poking into the clouds as a flight hazard, it appeared that Vang Pao's Auto Defense Choc (ADC) guerrillas would have to fight without air support. Communist troops closed within 100 meters of the Royalists; they broke into the Royalists' final defense line on the north perimeter at 0630 hours. One American Central Intelligence Agency adviser was killed; the other found himself trapped in the headquarters radio shack with only a shotgun and a radio for defense. He called for air support at 0650 hours.

Disregarding the weather, two tactical air flights were diverted to support Nakhang. The F-105 Thunderchiefs arrived at 0730 hours and circled above the overcast until Venom Lead, Lieutenant Colonel Eugene O. Conley, spiraled down through a small break in the clouds some distance from Lima Site 36. Dodging the mountains, Conley found himself buzzing Nakhang under a 200 meter ceiling. Unable to deliver ordnance at that low an altitude, he bluffed the Communists with low level passes until Dragonfly flight of A-1 Skyraiders of the 602nd Air Commando Squadron arrived at 0745 hours. The Air Commandos had been diverted from bombing a bridge on the Ho Chi Minh Trail.

Dragonfly Lead, Major Robert E. Turner, spiraled down through the overcast and recovered at 1,700 meters, amongst peaks taller than that. Having been told by the trapped adviser that he could strike anything outside the headquarters compound or its ridgeline, Turner began a series of time-consuming firing passes at the Communists. Unlike the F-105, the Skyraider was slow enough to aim at the Communists. Conserving ammunition and beginning at the northern slope where the attackers were closest to the adviser, Turner fired single rockets or short bursts of 20mm cannon fire to drive the Communists down onto the runway. As he was being damaged by heavy ground fire he flew through, he sometimes had to pull up into the overcast to go over hills and trees to avoid crashing.

After expending his ordnance, he circled up to his wingman, whom he led down into combat. Captain John D. Haney made nine firing passes while Turner distracted Communist gunners with more phony gunnery runs. By the time Haney ran out of munitions, his plane had also taken heavy battle damage from the extensive ground fire. Turner's later bogus attacks meant he had made about 25 passes at his enemy. Empty 20mm cartridge casings from the aircraft clattered on the roof over the adviser's head after some firing passes. Some of the ordnance was delivered within 50 meters of the ADC militia. The aerial attacks sparked the Hmong into a counterattack. Between them, Dragonfly flight had tied up their enemies for a crucial hour and five minutes.

Towards the end of Dragonfly's attacks, Butterfly 44 arrived on scene. The FAC took charge of the tactical air power coming on scene and directed it as the overcast cleared. Beginning with an incoming flight of Skyraiders, Butterfly 44 directed tactical air strikes on the Communists all day. Forty Vietnamese bodies littered the Royalist defenses; it was believed the PAVN suffered at least 100 dead. The attackers dispersed back into the wilderness.

That night was spent with the A-26 Invaders of the 606th Air Commando Squadron on alert in case of Communist attack. A clear morning began at 0645 hours with tactical air raids on suspected Communist field bivouacs. These sorties continued until 0920 hours. Then, working off a captured Communist map, Butterfly 44 found a retreating enemy force and directed 35 minutes of successful air strikes upon them.

During post-battle cleanup, bodies of 43 PAVN soldiers were cleared from the site. Later reports by friendly espionage agent estimated total PAVN dead at 250. Royalist losses were the American adviser killed, as well as eight Hmong soldiers. There were 24 Royalist soldiers wounded; nine were medically evacuated.

Dragonfly Lead Major Robert Earl Turner earned an Air Force Cross for his valor under the overcast of 6 January 1967. His wingman Captain John D. Haney earned a Silver Star. Venom Lead Lieutenant Colonel Eugene Ogden Conley was awarded a Distinguished Flying Cross (DFC) for his courageous bluff on 6 January 1967. Another pilot on the scene, Major John Smith Hamilton, won a DFC for his actions on 6 and 7 January 1967.

== Fourth battle of Nakhang ==
During the last week of 1968, the U.S. Air Force flew defoliant spraying missions around Nakhang, clearing fields of fire for its defense. Air strikes were directed around it to the point of superfluity. However, on 28 February 1969, the 174th Regiment of the PAVN 316th Division swarmed through the regrown elephant grass and assaulted the Royalist position. The attack was repulsed with ease; however, they prepared to evacuate the position. Evacuation of civilian dependents by the 20th Special Operations Squadron began. A-26 Invaders were called in to hit the attackers. For the first time, an AC-130 gunship fired support in Military Region 2.

Customarily, the PAVN allowed fleeing Royalist troops an avenue for retreat. However, when the Royalists broke out on 2 March, the PAVN unmercifully raked their departure. Of the five Royalist battalions involved, only two were fortunate enough to take about 50 percent casualties. The other three fared worse, with one battalion reduced to 30 effectives. Thai advisers with the Royalist garrison were killed except for one taken prisoner. At a cost of 26 dead, the PAVN overran Nakhang and its TACAN site, as Nakhang fell into Communist hands.
