= Shooting at the Moon =

Shooting at the Moon may refer to:

- Shooting at the Moon (album)
- Shooting at the Moon (film)
- Shooting at the Moon (book)

== See also ==
- Shoot the Moon (disambiguation)
