= Moonshot =

Moonshot, moon shot or Moonshots may refer to:

- Apollo program, American spaceflight program to land humans on the Moon
- Soviet moonshot, unsuccessful Soviet crewed lunar programs
- A mission to the Moon
- Moonshot AI, Chinese artificial intelligence company

== Books ==
- Moon Shot, a 1994 book by astronaut Alan Shepard, with Jay Barbree & Howard Benedict
- Moonshot: The Flight Of Apollo 11, a 2009 picture book written and illustrated by Brian Floca

== Film and television ==
- Moonshot (2009 film), a television film of the story leading up to Apollo 11's Moon landing
- Moonshot (2022 film), a science-fiction film
- "Moonshot" (Legends of Tomorrow), an episode of Legends of Tomorrow
- "Moonshot", an episode of The Good Doctor
- "Moon Shot" (The Flumps), a children's TV episode

== Music ==
- Moonshot (album), 1972 album by Buffy Sainte-Marie
- "Moonshot" (song), a 1972 song by Buffy Sainte-Marie, the title track off the eponymous album Moonshot (album)

== Other uses ==
- "Crypto moonshot," or "stock market moonshot," referring to sudden, monumental spikes in upward value for coins or shares, respectively
- Moonshot (baseball), home run that is hit very high
- Moonshot (company), a counter-extremism startup
- Moonshot Server, Hewlett Packard's (formerly Compaq)'s ProLiant series of blade server computers
- Operation Moonshot, 2020 plan for mass COVID-19 testing in England

== See also ==
- Exploration of the Moon, physical exploration of Earth's natural satellite
- Cancer Moonshot (disambiguation)
- Shoot the Moon (disambiguation)
