= Lima Site 36 =

US Air Force facility in Laos, Vietnam

Site information
- Type: Air Force
- Condition: abandoned

Location
- Coordinates: 19.977°N 103.475°E
- Height: 4500 ft

Site history
- Built: 1965
- In use: 1965-9
- Battles/wars: Vietnam War

Garrison information
- Occupants: 1st Mobile Communications Group

Lima Site 36 (also known as LS-36) was an Air America and U.S. Air Force facility built in the village of Na Khang, near the Plain of Jars in Laos, during the Vietnam War. It was the scene of several clashes in 1966, 1967 and 1968 and was finally captured by the People's Army of Vietnam forces in 1969.

== History ==
From 1965 LS-36 was used as a forward base for U.S. Air Force combat search and rescue helicopters of the 38th Air Rescue Squadron. Two squadron helicopters would deploy at dawn from Udorn Royal Thai Air Force Base to LS-36 and the crews would then pass the time awaiting distress calls from aircraft on missions over Laos or North Vietnam. At the end of the day the helicopters would return to Udorn.

After overrunning Lima Site 27 on the night of 12 February 1966, on the early morning of 17 February 1966, Pathet Lao and People's Army of Vietnam (PAVN) forces attacked LS-36. The attackers had a strength of 600–1000 men and included elements of the PAVN 5th Battalion, 168th Regiment. Advancing under mortar fire they seized high ground to the southeast of the airstrip, while the defenders responded with artillery fire. An AC-47 gunship provided fire support until dawn when a Raven FAC was able to take off and direct F-105 air strikes against the attackers. At 17:30 all Americans at the site were withdrawn by helicopter to Lima Site 48. At 04:30 on 18 February the Pathet Lao/PAVN renewed their attack on the site to be met with renewed air strikes after sunrise. Later that morning General Vang Pao arrived by helicopter to review the operations and this prompted a renewed attack wounding him before his helicopter made a hasty evacuation. U.S. Ambassador William H. Sullivan authorized the use of Napalm strikes for the first time in the war and two strikes took place that afternoon, but seemed to have little effect on the determined enemy. Later strikes were directed against ammunition and petroleum storage areas to prevent these falling into enemy hands. On 19 February the last Hmong forces withdrew from LS-36 and further airstrikes were made on Pathet Lao/PAVN positions and to destroy abandoned material. At least 70 Pathet Lao/PAVN bodies were counted while Hmong casualties were described as light.

On 25 May 1966, Vang Pao's forces regained LS-36 from the Pathet Lao/PAVN. In December 1966, intelligence reports noted a buildup of PAVN forces for a potential attack on LS-36, Lima Site 52 or Lima Site 85. At 06:00 on 6 January 1967 a force of 600–800 PAVN attacked the base from the northwest, south and southwest. One of two U.S. advisers was killed in the initial attack, while the other was able to call for air support. The first strike package of F-105s arrived at 07:30 but were unable to attack due to low cloud cover at the base. Two A-1Es from the 602nd Fighter Squadron soon arrived over the base and were able to penetrate the cloud cover to hit the PAVN with rocket and cannon fire. These strikes held back the PAVN and allowed the Hmong to counterattack and restore a defensive perimeter. More A-1Es arrived over the base and the cloud cover began to lift allowing for increased airstrikes. The PAVN withdrew from the base leaving 40 dead and Vang Pao arrived to assume command of operations. During the night Nimrod A-26s patrolled over the base to prevent the PAVN from regrouping for a renewed attack. On the morning of 7 January more A-1s struck the base perimeter and likely egress routes. U.S./Hmong losses were 9 killed while the PAVN suffered 43 confirmed killed, with a further 200+ estimated to have been killed.

Following the loss of Lima Site 85 on 10–11 March 1968, Ambassador Sullivan predicted an imminent attack against LS-36. In late April PAVN/Pathet Lao probes to the east of LS-36 increased and by the second week of May 215 of 239 Operation Barrel Roll sorties were dedicated to the site's defense causing the PAVN to draw back. PAVN strength was estimated at five battalions, approximately equal to the 1500 Hmong defenders of the base. On 20 May the PAVN renewed their attack but this was met with 60 sorties per day in defense, again blunting the attack. A counter-attack by Hmong forces in early June pushed the PAVN further from LS-36.

In July 1968, following the loss of the TACAN site at Lima Site 85, the U.S. Air Force established a TACAN site at LS-36 as part of Operation Bright Light to support air operations over southern Laos and Vietnam. The site operated as TACAN Channel 77. The TACAN was operated by two technicians from the 1st Mobile Communications Group.

On 28 February 1969, the PAVN 316th Division attacked LS-36 and by 1 March 1969 the Hmong forces abandoned the site to the PAVN.

== Current use ==
The site is abandoned and turned over to farmland and housing.

== See also ==
- Battles of Nakhang
- Muang Phalan TACAN Site
