= Raven Forward Air Controllers =

Covert air unit during the Vietnam War

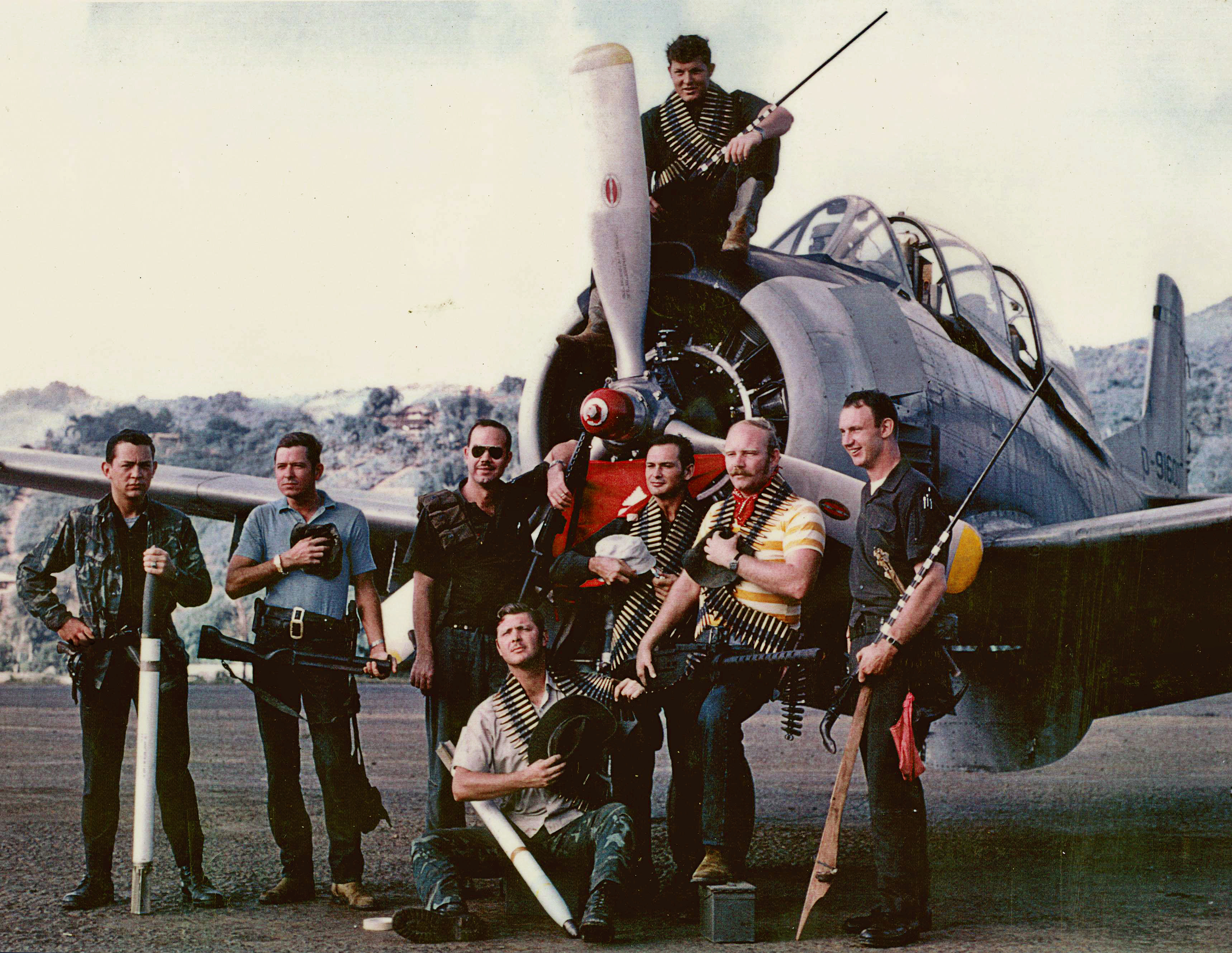
Ravens with a T-28D Trojan at Long Tieng, Laos, 1970.

The Raven Forward Air Controllers, also known as The Ravens, were fighter pilots (special operations capable) used as forward air controllers (FACs) in a clandestine and covert operation in conjunction with the US Central Intelligence Agency (CIA) in Laos during America's Vietnam War. The Ravens pinpointed targets for most of the air strikes against communist Lao People's Liberation Army and People's Army of Vietnam (PAVN) infiltrators in support of the Laotian Hmong guerrilla army.

== Background ==
On 23 July 1962, the United States and the Democratic Republic of Vietnam (DRV) signed the Geneva Accords guaranteeing the neutrality of the Kingdom of Laos. One of the provisions of the accords called for the withdrawal of all foreign troops from Laotian soil. North Vietnam had troops still remaining in Laos from the end of the First Indochina War. The United States had a small contingent of advisors which it withdrew from the country.

The North Vietnamese deliberately ignored the accords because they were intent on keeping their supply corridor, the Ho Chi Minh trail, to continue their war against South Vietnam. North Vietnam's representatives repeatedly stated they had "no military presence in Laos", even though they had at least 4,000 troops stationed there from the end of the First Indochina War on.

Prince Souvanna Phouma, the Prime Minister of Laos, asked for US help to stop North Vietnamese incursions. To avoid the appearance of unilaterally violating the accords, US President John F. Kennedy directed the United States Air Force (USAF) to initiate clandestine and covert operations in Laos to help the Lao fight the North Vietnamese communists.

== USAF covert operations ==
As USAF tactical air strikes began in Laos, it became apparent that, for the safety of noncombatants, some means of control was necessary. Beginning at least as early as July 1964, the absence of a close air support control system caused a variety of enterprising individuals to improvise procedures for marking ground targets. At various times, ground markers, including bamboo arrows and dropped smoke grenades, were used. Those marking targets often had little or no training in close air support (CAS). They varied in nationality, being Thai, Lao, or Hmong, as well as American. Both Continental Air Services, Inc and Air America pilots would sometimes serve as ad hoc forward air controllers.

=== Butterflies ===
To begin operations, the USAF originally assigned four sergeants from Combat Control Teams in 1963. These sergeants turned in their uniforms and military identification and were supplied with false identification so they could work in civilian clothing. This process was designed to preserve the fiction of US non-involvement. Once "civilianized", these "Butterflies", as they were known, flew in the right (co-pilot's) seat in Air America Helio Couriers and Pilatus Porters. They were often accompanied by a Lao or Thai interpreter in the back seat. The Air Commando sergeants directed the air strikes according to USAF doctrine, using the radio call sign "Butterfly".

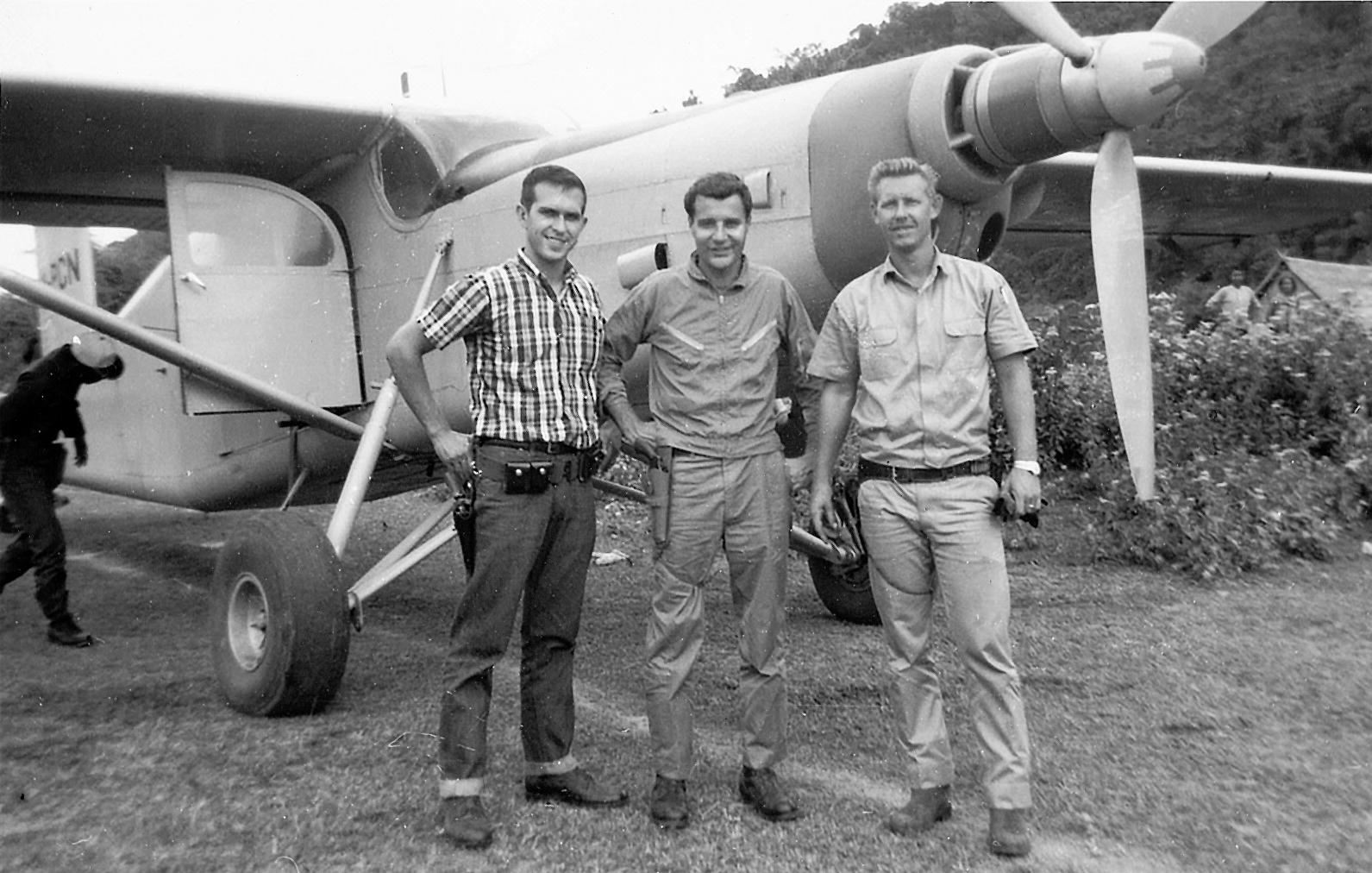
Butterfly FACs with a Pilatus Porter in 1966.

Two of the Butterfly US Combat Control Teams (CCT) were Master Sergeant Charles Larimore Jones, soon joined by Technical Sergeant James J. Stanford. Another of the Butterflies was Major John J. Garrity, Jr., who in future would spend several years as the éminence grise of the US Embassy in Laos. They, and their successors, controlled air strikes without notice or objection until General William Momyer discovered that enlisted men were directing air strikes. At that point, he ordered their replacement with rated fighter pilots. By that time, the number of Butterflies had increased to six. In April 1966, General Momyer put an end to both the impromptu efforts to control air strikes and the Butterfly effort.

Development of rules of engagement by the embassy placed more emphasis on increased control over in-country close air support. So did the introduction of an integrated close air support system for Southeast Asia. Beginning in April 1966, as part of its effort to better direct air strikes, the USAF installed four Tactical air navigation systems in Laos to guide US air strikes. One of these was emplaced on a mountain top at Lima Site 85, aimed across the border at Hanoi.

=== Ravens ===
A successor operation, code-named Palace Dog, began replacing the original Butterfly effort in 1966. CIA's agent James William Lair recommended the use of Lao interpreters flying in the rear seat of light aircraft flown by US pilots, thus establishing the Ravens. The Ravens were fighter pilots in unarmed light aircraft who flew observation missions, marked enemy targets with smoke rockets, directed air strikes onto them, and observed and reported bomb damage assessments post strike. They were based in five Lao towns: Vientiane, Luang Prabang, Pakse, Savannakhet, and Long Tieng.

==== Recruitment ====
Recruiting for the Ravens began when air force personnel reported for duty assignments in Vietnam. Forward air controllers beginning a tour in Southeast Asia were told as part of their orientation briefing that halfway through their year's tour of duty in Vietnam, they were eligible to volunteer for special duty via the "Steve Canyon Program". To be accepted for Steve Canyon, a pilot had to have a minimum of four months combat duty, including at least 60 days' service as a FAC, at least 100 hours' flight time as a fighter pilot or FAC, at least 750 hours flying time overall, and six months or more time remaining on his tour in Southeast Asia. Those who volunteered for the program did so with no knowledge of their destination. After screening by the 56th Special Operations Wing at Nakhon Phanom RTAFB, they received temporary duty orders, and were sent to the US Embassy, Vientiane, Laos. There they were stripped of all military identification and gear, supplied with USAID identification, and garbed in civilian clothing to be worn at all times. The screening system tended to select experienced and aggressive FACs.

The Ravens belonged only tangentially to the US Air Force. By presidential directive, the ambassador controlled all US military activity in Laos. The Ravens performed their duties under direction of the air attaché who in turn reported to the ambassador. The air force kept the Ravens' records and paid them, but had no operational control over them, although 7/13th Air Force was formed in an attempt to regain control of their pilots. Generals William Westmoreland and William Momyer both wanted to gain control of the outfit and the war in Laos. However, Ambassador William Sullivan, and his successor, G. McMurtrie Godley, continued to oversee air strikes in Laos. This was intolerable to the air force. In some cases, individual Ravens received poor ratings and slow promotions due to their participation in the program. The Ravens, however, liked the ambiguity of the situation because it left them free to coordinate air strikes with the CIA operatives running the local ground troops.

==== Operational history ====
In November 1964, Roy Dalton was the first rated officer to augment the Butterflies. He was stationed at LS 36, a dirt air strip near Na Khang, Laos; he directed air strikes by the Royal Lao Air Force (RLAF) while riding in Air America helicopters, or from observation posts on mountaintops.

The Raven program was officially founded on 5 May 1966. It began with two pilots on 90 days' temporary duty, working out of aircraft borrowed from Air America. Lieutenants Jim F. Lemon and Truman Young had been directing air strikes on either side of the Vietnamese Demilitarized Zone (VDZ). Upon their return to Nakhon Phanom Royal Thai Air Force Base, they were told that their unauthorized aerobatics and drunken transgressions would be forgotten if they volunteered for a secret program—the Ravens. Joined by a third Raven, they began 90-day TDY tours flying support for the Royal Lao Army.

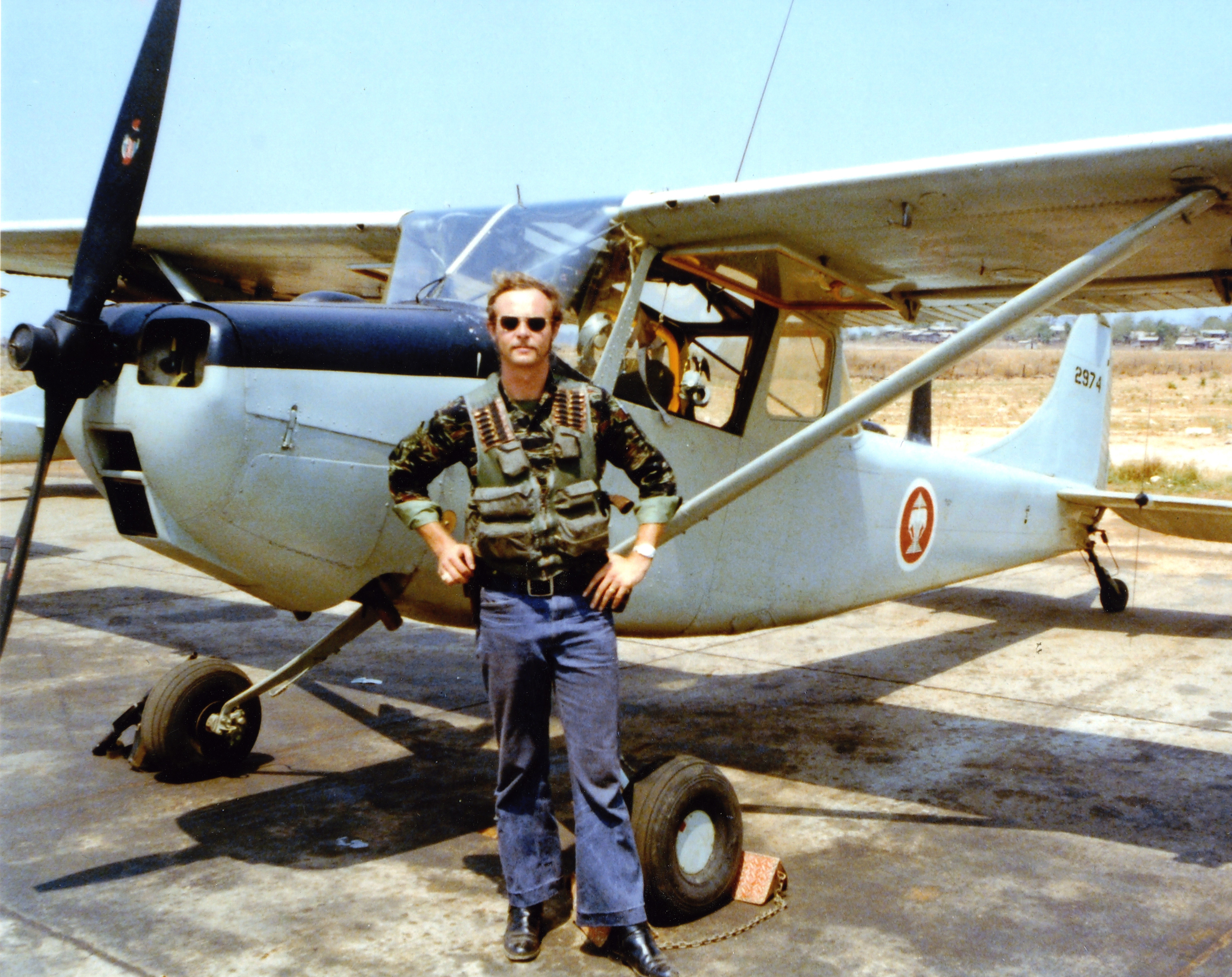
A Raven FAC at Pakse, Laos, in 1973.

In December, 1966, they acquired the use of an O-1 Bird Dog assigned to the Royal Lao Air Force at Savannakhet. Unlike the borrowed Air America planes, the O-1 had additional radios and smoke rocket tubes for improved communications and target marking. A de Havilland Canada DHC-2 Beaver and a Helio Courier were also acquired, but seemed not to be used for directing air strikes.

By August 1967, the three Raven FACs on duty in Laos were augmented by three more Ravens stationed with Detachment 1, 606th Air Commando Squadron at Nakhon Phanom. At about the same time, the air attaché in Vientiane requested O-1s unmarked by national insignia be supplied by 7/13th Air Force, on the grounds that the Ravens needed their own airplanes instead of riding with civilian pilots. The O-1s were supplied. By November 1967, the Raven head count had increased to eight. The number of Ravens would increase in a futile attempt to keep up with the swelling tide of air strikes Laos, but they would never number more than 22 assigned at one time.

The chronic shortage of Ravens meant that they often spent long stretches flying combat missions. Raven John Mansur recalled flying as long as 11 hours, 45 minutes in a day. Ron Rinehart exceeded that, logging a 14-hour flight day. Incoming air strikes arrived en masse, with as many as six flights of fighter-bombers stacked up at various altitudes awaiting their turn to bomb. Rinehart would remain on station until his marking rockets were expended, all windows on his O-1 slathered in grease-penciled notes of air strikes, and his fuel tank empty. On three occasions, he landed dead stick back at base when he ran out of gas. In a single month, he directed over 1,000 tactical air strikes, flying over 280 combat hours. If President Lyndon B. Johnson’s March 1968 partial bombing halt diverted a steady stream of air power from Vietnam into Laos, his 1 November 1968 moratorium flooded the kingdom with US air power and overwhelmed the four Ravens stationed in northeastern Laos.

Tactical air power was allocated at a conference by 7/13th Air Force in Saigon. Air Attaché Colonel Robert Tyrell came away from this with 60% of all tactical air strikes in Southeast Asia scheduled for attacks within Laos. The position of Head Raven was created to serve as a de facto Air Liaison Officer, and the number of Ravens in-country doubled to handle the new work load. General Vang Pao, the ground commander of the CIA's clandestine army of Hmong hill tribesmen, used tactical air as airborne artillery. His combat operations became dependent upon it.

==== Operational hazards ====
Both the O-1s and the later-supplied U-17s had severe maintenance problems in the beginning. Maintenance was spotty. It was performed by pilots, poorly trained Lao mechanics, or USAF technicians. The piston engines were tuned for optimum performance at Udorn Royal Thai Air Force Base's low elevation. They would run raggedly in the highlands of Laos. Adding to the woes were high power settings needed for maximum weight takeoffs, toting maximal loads, or short-field takeoffs. Engine life in O-1s fell from 1,800 hours to 400 hours flight time.

Engine failures became epidemic. Eighteen engine failures occurred during the last quarter of 1968. Karl Polifka (call sign Raven 45) reported 26 in a month, apparently February 1969. The upcountry USAF technicians were then replaced by Air America mechanics. The chief mechanic at Pakse was Stan Wilson and at Long Tieng was Dan Williams.

This led to all the O-1s being cycled through Udorn to have their fuel tanks cleaned out. Some of them had 18 years of crud and mud contaminating the tanks. Radio wiring, engine re-timing, and fuel system cleaning were accomplished on each aircraft and by May 1969 engine problems dropped drastically after that.

Anti-aircraft fire could be intense and accurate. Some Raven aircraft were known to take up to 50 rounds in battle damage on a single sortie.

Working as a Raven FAC was an exhausting, high-risk, high-stress job. The casualty rate among them ran about 50% wounded and killed; one calculation by a participating Raven at his end of tour was that 90% of the Raven planes had been hit by ground fire during their tours of duty; 60% had been downed by enemy action at some point; 30% had been killed in action. Note: Craig Duehring, who made this calculation, later became an Assistant Secretary of the Air Force. The roster of 161 Ravens includes the Butterfly FACs, none of whom were killed in action, as well as an army attaché, who was. Twenty-three of the Air Force Ravens died during the Secret War; Army Attaché Joseph Bush was the 24th. Robbins lists all Ravens deceased prior to the publication of his book. USAF Ravens are not listed in the 1988 directory of names of the Vietnam Veterans Memorial, although they do appear on the wall.

== Legacy ==
Laos became the most bombed nation in history, largely due to the Raven FACs. Approximately the same tonnage of bombs were dropped on Laos as were dropped by the US in the entirety of World War II. Approximately 20% of the Laotian populace became refugees, largely relocating because of bombing. As of 2020, Laos is still plagued by unexploded ordnance.

== See also ==
- Battle of Lima Site 85 (March 1968)
- CIA activities in Laos
- Forward air control during the Vietnam War
- Long Tieng
- North Vietnamese invasion of Laos
- Operation Barrel Roll
- Vang Pao
- Shooting at the Moon (book)
