= James J. Stanford =

Senior Master Sergeant James J. "Jim" Stanford (died 25 August 2012) was a United States Air Force air traffic controller. He instituted forward air control techniques for directing air strikes during the Vietnam War and the Laotian Civil War.

Despite his Combat Controller activities being restricted by his lack of a pilot's license, no access to military aircraft, and a ban on using rocketry to mark targets for strikes, Stanford flew 218 combat missions in Laos. Although his duties were abruptly ended by a decision by General William W. Momyer, Stanford had demonstrated the necessity for forward air control in Laos; his successors were the Raven Forward Air Controllers. The resulting air campaigns would drop about the same tonnage of bombs on Laos as were dropped during the entirety of World War II. After serving 24 years in the U.S. Air Force, Stanford transitioned to an allied civilian job in airfield management for a further 20-year career. He died on 25 August 2012 as a result of surgery.

== Biography ==
James J. Stanford began his military career by enlisting in the U.S. Air Force in January 1955. After training as an Air Traffic Controller, he directed air traffic in various assignments, in the United States, Greenland, and Germany. When he was accepted for Combat Controller training in June 1963, he already had a background of experience in directing aircraft. He subsequently was a member of a seven-man team sent on temporary duty to Colombia; the air commandos trained the Colombian Air Force in both counter-insurgency and paratroop operations.

Jim Stanford subsequently served in both South Vietnam and the Kingdom of Thailand during the Vietnam War. Technical Sergeant Stanford was subsequently assigned to the Kingdom of Laos, along with Charles Larimore Jones, in early 1966 to advise General Vang Pao on air operations for the Laotian Civil War. When Stanford arrived in Laos, various improvised systems were being used to direct air strikes. A short-lived forward air control system had proved its worth from 19–29 July 1964 during Operation Triangle. This success led to establishment of ongoing bombing campaigns in Laos. Operation Barrel Roll began channeling air strikes into northern Laos on 14 December 1964. Operation Steel Tiger began bombing the Ho Chi Minh trail in southern Laos on 3 April 1965.

With this background, the need for forward air control was apparent. Stanford was assigned to Nakhon Phanom Royal Thai Air Force Base in April 1966 to ride along on forward air control missions against North Vietnamese efforts to resupply their troops in Laos. A month later, he was infiltrated into Laos in civilian clothing and with no military identification. While working in mufti, he used his Combat Controller expertise to work around restrictions forbidding the use of smoke rockets to mark targets in Laos for air strikes. Because he wasn't a pilot, he rode in the co-pilot's seat when he flew. Because no military aircraft were available, Stanford cadged rides with civilian pilots on hire by the Central Intelligence Agency. While operating predominantly from tiny hazardously substandard Lima Site airstrips in the wilds of Laos used by Air America and Continental Air Services, Stanford flew 218 combat missions. His estimation of the Lima strips: "Most of them were unbelievable, 300 to 400 feet long, not in a straight line, with all sorts of inclines. Some were shaved off mountain tops and some followed curved ridgelines."

Although he usually directed bombings by verbal description of the terrain, Stanford also resorted to directly dropping hand grenades in glass jars and scrounged 100-pound bombs to mark close air support targets for harried Royal Lao Army troops under attack. Given the number of U.S. Air Force, U.S. Navy, and Royal Lao Air Force flights available for air strikes, he was often a very busy combatant.

Stanford's assignment in Laos came to an abrupt end in late 1966. When General William W. Momyer, the commander of 7/13th Air Force, discovered that the Combat Controllers in Laos were enlisted non-pilots, he abruptly ended the Butterfly Forward Air Control program and replaced it with the officer pilots of the Raven Forward Air Controllers.

Stanford spent 1967–1968 in South Vietnam supporting airlift operations. He returned to Vietnam in late 1970 to serve with the 1198th Operational Evaluation and Training Squadron's Project Heavy Chain. He returned to the United States in late 1972. Meanwhile, the Laotian bombing campaigns that Stanford had fostered crested at about 300 strike sorties daily during 1969. By the time the bombing in Laos halted on 22 February 1973, 2,093,100 tons of bombs had been dropped in Laos; by comparison, 2,150,000 tons of bombs were dropped in the entirety of World War II. The bombing in Laos was a major factor in turning an estimated 20% of Laotians into internal refugees. After further assignments in Greenland and Arkansas, Stanford retired as a Senior Master Sergeant on 24 years service in January 1979. He then worked in airfield supervision at Little Rock Air Force Base as a civilian employee until he retired from that job in 1999. In later years, he also earned a private pilot's license through the Federal Aviation Administration; he was also licensed by the FAA as a senior parachute rigger.

James J. Stanford died on 25 August 2012, following surgery.

== Honors and awards ==
- Bronze Star with Clusters
- Air Medal with Clusters
- Meritorious Service Medal
- Air Force Commendation Medal with Clusters
- U.S. Marine Corps Presidential Unit Citation
- USAF Presidential Unit Award with "V" device
- USAF Outstanding Unit Award with Clusters
- USAF Combat Readiness Medal with Clusters
- Armed Forces Expeditionary Medal
- Vietnam Service Medal with Battle Stars
- Vietnam Cross of Gallantry with Palm
- USAF Master Parachutist Badge (HALO qualified)
- USAF Master Air Traffic Controller Badge
- Aircrew Badge
