= Shoot the Moon (disambiguation) =

Shoot the Moon is a 1982 American drama film.

Shoot the Moon may also refer to:

== Film and television ==
- Shoot the Moon, a 1996 film featuring Veronica Cartwright
- Shooting the Moon, a 1998 Italian film
- "Shoot the Moon" (Daredevil: Born Again), an episode of Daredevil: Born Again

== Games ==
- Shooting the moon, is a strategy in the card game Hearts
- Shoot the Moon (dominoes), a variation of the dominoes game 42 played with 3 players

== Music ==
- Shoot the Moon (Judie Tzuke album), 1982
- Shoot the Moon: The Essential Collection, an album by Face to Face
- Shoot the Moon (EP), a 1999 EP by Pinhead Gunpowder
- "Shoot the Moon", a song by Voodoo Glow Skulls from the album Firme
- "I'll Shoot the Moon", a 1993 song by Tom Waits from The Black Rider

== See also ==
- Moonshot (disambiguation)
- Shooting at the Moon (disambiguation)
