= Bull Benini =

United States Air Force Chief Master Sergeant

Alcides Benini
- Born: Alcide Sylvio Benini; 15 October 1921; Cologna-Gavazzo, Trentino-Alto Adige, Italy
- Died: 16 April 2015 (aged 93); Hampton, Virginia
- Military career
- Allegiance: United States
- Branch: United States Army (1940–1953); United States Air Force (1953–1970)
- Service years: 1940–1970
- Rank: Chief master sergeant
- Nickname: Bull
- Units: 31st Infantry Regiment (1940–1945); 82nd Airborne Division Pathfinder Platoon (1945–1952); Special Forces Qualification Course (1952–1953); Combat Control Team (1953–1970)
- Conflicts: World War II: Philippines campaign (1941–1942); Bataan Death March; Kashmir 1960: Operation Road Grader

Alcide Sylvio "Bull" Benini (15 October 1921 – 16 April 2015) was a United States Air Force Chief Master Sergeant. He survived the Bataan Death March during World War II while serving with the United States Army. Post war, he was a "founding father" of the United States Air Force Combat Control Teams, serving until 1970. He was known to comrades and friends as "Bull" because of his experiences, especially survival of the Bataan Death in March and subsequent imprisonment.

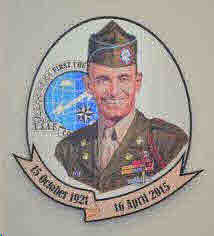
The first Combat Controllerː Alcide S. "Bull" Benini

== Early life ==
Born 15 October 1921 in Cologna-Gavazzo, Trentino-Alto Adige, Italy, to Luigi Benini and Elvira née Zanoni, in 1930 he migrated to the United States arriving aboard the SS Conte Grande, at Ellis Island. He later joined his father who was a coal miner in Pennsylvania. When Benini was 13 his father died of blacklung disease and he became the family's sole provider. Nicknamed Bull because of his experiences, Bull Benini is the only name by which he is known to comrades and public.

== Military career ==
=== Early years and World War II ===
On 6 May 1940, Benini enlisted in the United States Army and, within six weeks was sent to the Philippines with the 31st Infantry Regiment as a rifleman and radio operator. While there, he fought against the Japanese until his capture in March 1942. Benini then spent three-and-a-half years in Japanese captivity; surviving the Bataan Death March and a Japanese hell ship, before internment in camps in Hong Kong, Formosa, and finally Japan.

=== Post war ===
After the war, he went to United States Army Airborne School and was assigned to the Pathfinder Platoon of the 82nd Airborne Division. In July 1952, he was selected to be part of the initial cadre for the first Army Special Forces Qualification Course at Fort Bragg, North Carolina, based largely on his wartime experiences and his fluency in both Italian and Spanish languages. Benini enjoyed his Special Forces work. It was during this period that the Air Force established its own Pathfinder program, and he was recruited to help develop it. On 8 January 1953, he resigned from the Army and on the same day enlisted in the Air Force as an E-6, with the promise of promotion to E-7 within six months. The name of the Pathfinder program was changed to Combat Control, and Benini became the first official Combat Controller. As the first non-commissioned officer-in-charge of a Combat Control Team, he took the lead in establishing the team's new tactics, procedures, organization, and logistics requirements – as one of the founding fathers of the Air Force's Combat Control mission.

=== Special and humanitarian operations ===
For the next fifteen years, Benini led his teams to numerous hot spots such as the Congo, Lebanon, Pakistan, and Kashmir.

Operation Road Grader-Kashmir
In December 1960 at the request of the Pakistani Air Force, USAFE airlifted 600 tons of cement and 64 tons of heavy construction equipment from Peshawar Air Base and airdropped them over Chilas, Kashmir to assist a road-building project in Northern Pakistan. Six C-130s of the 322nd Air Division based at Évreux, France flew a total of 55 sorties during the project, known as Operation Road Grader. Four USAF Combat Controllers of the 5th Aerial Port Squadron, including Alcide S. "Bull" Benini were tasked to support the mission.

=== Post service life ===
Benini retired on 31 July 1970 as a Chief Master Sergeant with thirty years of active duty service, three-and-a-half of which were spent as a prisoner of war. He was a candidate for the first Chief Master Sergeant of the Air Force. The Combat Control Heritage Center at Pope Air Force Base is named in his honor. He died on 16 April 2015 in the Hampton Veterans Administration Hospital Hospice in Hampton, Virginia, three days later he was buried in Arlington National Cemetery.

Alcide was survived by his children, Sylvia Benini, Michael and Christopher Benini, Jane Ables, Lisa and Lori Benini, grandchildren Adrianna Henricks, Brittany and Kaylee Ables, Daniel and Isabella Benini. He was preceded in death by his father Luigi, mother Elvira, sister Ancilla, and brother Adriano.
