= United States Air Force Combat Control Team =

Unit of the US Air Force specializing in combat air-ground communication

U.S. Air Force Combat Control Team
- U.S. Air Force Combat Control flash (colorized)
- Active: January 1953 – present
- Country: United States of America
- Branch: United States Air Force
- Type: Special Operations Force
- Role: Airfield Assault Zone establishment, special reconnaissance, Air traffic control, fire support
- Size: 360 (As of 2013)
- Part of: United States Special Operations Command; Air Force Special Operations Command
- Nicknames: CCT, Air Commando
- Motto: "First There"
- Color of Beret: Scarlet Red
- Engagements: Korean War; Vietnam War; Invasion of Grenada; Invasion of Panama; Gulf War; Operation Gothic Serpent: Battle of Mogadishu (1993); Afghanistan War; Iraq War
- Website: https://www.airforce.com/careers/special-warfare-and-combat-support/special-warfare/combat-control

Insignia
- Combat Controller scarlet beret with badge

The United States Air Force Combat Control Teams, singular Combat Controller (CCT) (AFSC 1Z2X1), are an elite special operations force (specifically known as "special tactics operators") who specialize in all aspects of air-ground communication, as well as air traffic control, fire support (including rotary and fixed-wing close air support), and command, control, and communications in covert, forward, or austere environments.

Assigned to Special Tactics Squadrons and Special Tactics Teams along with Pararescuemen, Special Operations Reconnaissance, and Tactical Air Control Party (TACP) operators, Combat Controllers are an integral part of Air Force Special Operations Command (AFSOC), the Air Force component of United States Special Operations Command (USSOCOM), and of Joint Special Operations Command (JSOC). Trained in underwater and maritime operations, freefall parachuting, and many other deployment methods, Combat Controllers are often assigned individually or as a team to Army Special Forces, Army Ranger, Navy SEAL, and Delta Force to provide expert airfield seizure, airstrike control, and communications capabilities.

Combat Controllers are FAA-certified air traffic controllers and maintain proficiency throughout their career. Along with TACPs, many Combat Controllers also qualify and maintain proficiency as joint terminal attack controllers (JTACs) where they call in and direct air strikes, close air support and fire support. Out of the 12 Air Force Crosses awarded since the War in Afghanistan began in 2001, 10 have been awarded to Combat Controllers for extraordinary heroism in combat. Combat Controllers provided vital intelligence; and deployed with joint air and ground forces in support of direct action, counter-terrorism, foreign internal defense, humanitarian assistance, special reconnaissance, austere airfield, and combat search and rescue missions.

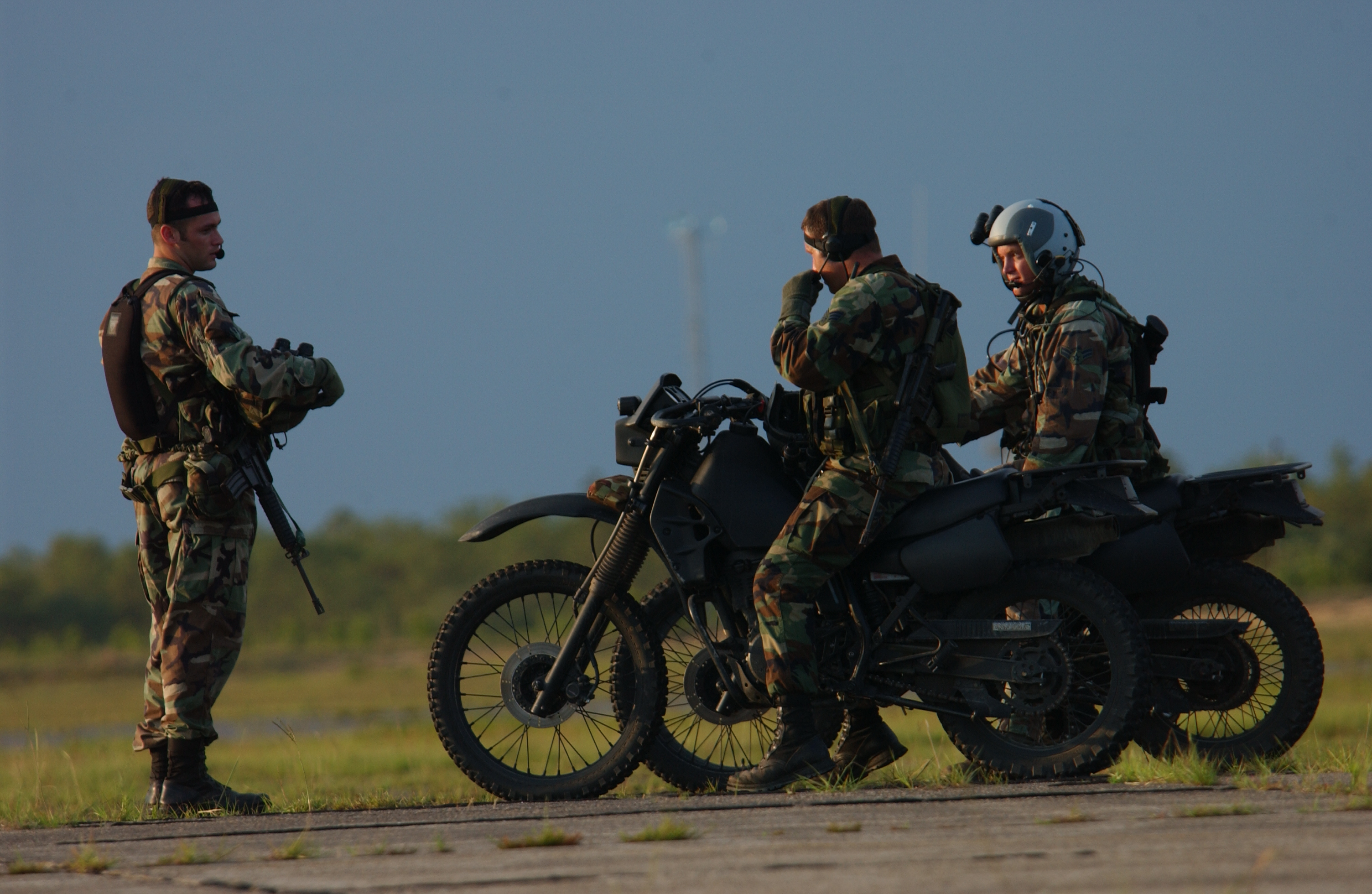
Combat Controllers on dirtbikes

== Motto ==
CCT's motto, "First There," reaffirms the Combat Controller's commitment to undertaking the most dangerous missions behind enemy lines by leading the way for other forces to follow.

== Mission ==
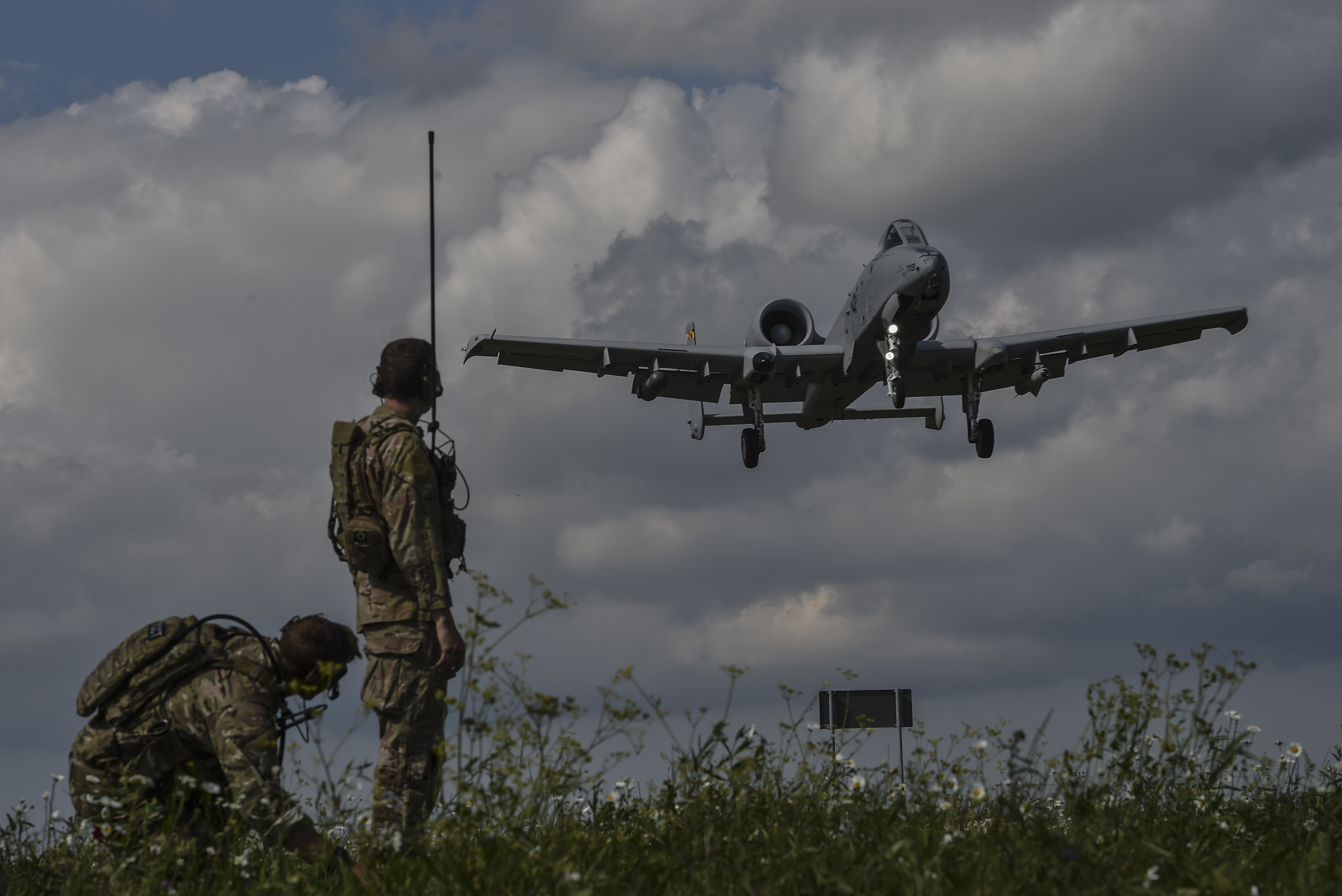
Two Combat Controllers watching an A-10 Thunderbolt II landing on the Jägala-Käravete Highway in Estonia, 2017

Air Force Special Operations Command's Combat Controllers are battlefield airmen assigned to special tactics squadrons. They are trained special operations forces and certified Federal Aviation Administration air traffic controllers. The mission of a Combat Controller is to deploy undetected into combat and hostile environments to conduct special reconnaissance, establish assault zones or airfields, while simultaneously conducting air traffic control, fire support, command, control, and communications and forward air control. They deploy with air and ground forces in support of direct action, such as counter-terrorism, foreign internal defense, humanitarian assistance, and combat search and rescue. Combat Controllers employ all-terrain vehicles, amphibious vehicles, weapons and demolitions in pursuit of their objectives, which may include obstacle destruction.

== Training ==
Combat Controller training, which is nearly two years long, is among the most rigorous in the US military. The CCT pipeline has a wash out rate upwards of 90–95%, mostly due to self-eliminations, injuries sustained during training, and academic failures. The Air Force is working to lower the washout rate through proper education, testing and rigorous pre-pipeline training.

Combat Controllers maintain air traffic controller qualification skills throughout their career in addition to other special operations skills. Many qualify and maintain proficiency as joint terminal attack controllers (JTACs). Their 35-week initial training and unique mission skills earn them the right to wear the scarlet beret and their 3 skill level (apprentice). From that point they attend a 12–15-month advanced skill training course to obtain their 5 skill level (journeyman). Once they complete AST their training pipeline is finished and they are mission-ready Combat Controllers.

=== Initial training ===
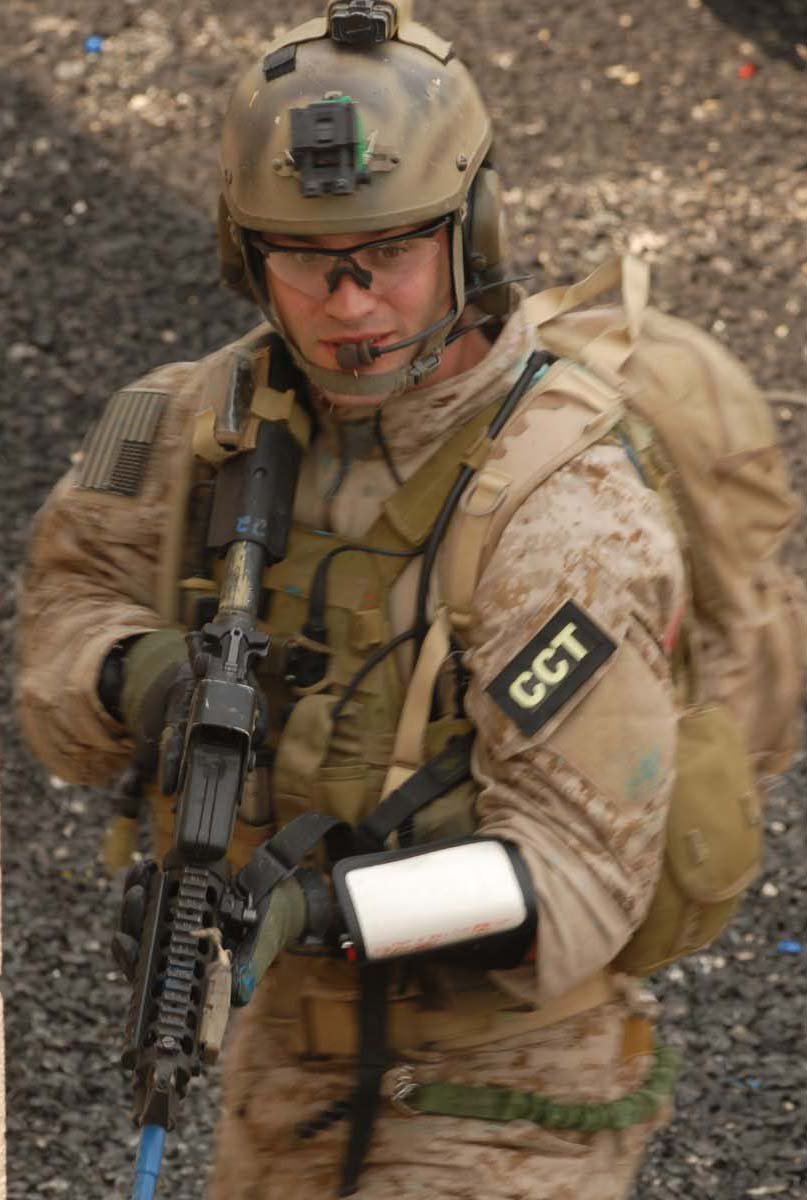
A Combat Controller wearing desert digital camouflage during MOUT training

The first course Combat Controller trainees attend after the 7.5-week Basic Military Training at Joint Base San Antonio, Lackland Air Force Base, Texas is Special Warfare Assessment and Selection (SW A&S), Lackland Air Force Base, Texas (4 weeks). For the entire length of the A&S, candidates will be thoroughly evaluated by both the psychologists and cadre in extremely demanding scenarios. A&S is divided into two segments: Field Phase and Selection Phase. Field Phase (2.5 weeks): Candidates can expect to be in a field like setting, sleeping in makeshift lodging in cots with sleeping bags. Training is continuous with zero down days, often experiencing continuous sleep deprivation. Training consists of surface swimming, water confidence, Grass & Guerrilla drills, running, rucking, calisthenics, team events and extended training days. Selection Phase (1.5 weeks): Following the field phase, candidates will begin clean up of the facilities and will be administered academic and psychological tests, surveys, critiques and interviews. Instructors will compile all relevant information and select only those candidates that meet the desired career field attributes.

Special Warfare Pre-Dive (SW Pre-Dive), Lackland Air Force Base, Texas (4 weeks) – This course is designed to prepare the candidates for Special Warfare Combat Dive school. Candidates will be subjected to more technical and difficult water confidence training. As of mid 2019, this course eliminated up to 30% of the A&S graduates.

After the USAF Combat Diver course the trainee attends the Army Airborne School at Fort Benning, Georgia. In the three-week course the trainees learn basic parachuting skills required to infiltrate an objective area by static line airdrop.

The next course after Airborne School is the Air Force Basic Survival School located at Fairchild Air Force Base, Washington. SERE School lasts three weeks. The course teaches techniques for survival in remote areas. Instruction includes principles, procedures, equipment and techniques that enable individuals to survive, regardless of climatic conditions or unfriendly environments, and return alive.

The next course in the CCT pipeline is the Combat Control Operator Course located at Keesler Air Force Base, Mississippi. The Operator course is 15.5 weeks long. The Operator course teaches aircraft recognition and performance, air navigation aids, weather, airport traffic control, flight assistance service, communication procedures, conventional approach control, radar procedures and air traffic rules.

The last course in the Combat Control pipeline is the Combat Control School located at Pope Field, North Carolina. The CCT School is thirteen weeks long and it provides the final Combat Controller qualifications. The training includes physical training, small unit tactics, land navigation, communications, assault zones, demolitions, fire support and field operations including parachuting. Graduates of Combat Control school are awarded their 3-skill level (apprentice) on their Air Force Specialty Code, scarlet beret and CCT flash.

=== Advanced training ===
After the Combat Controller gains their three level they attend Special Tactics Advanced Skills Training for 12 to 15 months as part of the Special Tactics Training Squadron located at Hurlburt Field, Florida. Advanced Skills Training is a program for newly assigned Combat Controllers, Pararescuemen and Special Reconnaissance. AST produces mission-ready operators for Air Force Special Operations Command and United States Special Operations Command. The AST schedule is broken down into four phases: water, ground, employment and full mission profile. The course tests the trainee's personal limits through demanding mental and physical training.

During Advanced Skills Training Combat Controllers (along with Special Reconnaissance) attend two more advanced courses. Army Military Free Fall Parachutist School at Fort Bragg, North Carolina, and Yuma Proving Ground, Arizona for five weeks. The course instructs free fall parachuting procedures. It also provides wind tunnel training, in-air instruction focusing on student stability, aerial maneuvers, air sense, parachute opening procedures and parachute canopy control. They also attend Air Force Combat Diver School which is hosted at the Navy Diving and Salvage Training Center, Naval Support Activity Panama City, Florida. Combat Diver School is six weeks long. After completion of Combat Diver School trainees become combat divers, learning to use scuba and closed circuit diving equipment to covertly infiltrate denied areas. The course provides training to depths of 130 feet, stressing development of maximum underwater mobility under various operating conditions. A class of CCTs and PJs at the Air Force Combat Diver School was covered by Discovery Channel's program Surviving the Cut during season two, which originally aired 25 July 2011.

== Assigned units ==
Once Combat Controllers complete advanced training they are assigned to Special Tactics Squadrons across Air Force Special Operations Command.

Active Duty units

- Air Force Special Operations Command, Hurlburt Field, Florida
  - 24th Special Operations Wing, Hurlburt Field, Florida
    - 720th Special Tactics Group, Hurlburt Field, Florida
      - 21st Special Tactics Squadron, Pope Field, North Carolina
      - 22nd Special Tactics Squadron, Joint Base Lewis-McChord (McChord Air Force Base), Washington
      - 23rd Special Tactics Squadron, Hurlburt Field, Florida
      - 26th Special Tactics Squadron, Cannon Air Force Base, New Mexico
    - 724th Special Tactics Group, Pope Field, North Carolina
      - 24th Special Tactics Squadron, Pope Field, North Carolina
  - 353d Special Operations Wing, Kadena Air Base, Japan
    - 320th Special Tactics Squadron, Kadena Air Base, Japan
  - 352d Special Operations Wing, RAF Mildenhall, United Kingdom
    - 321st Special Tactics Squadron, RAF Mildenhall, United Kingdom
- United States Air Forces in Europe
  - 31st Fighter Wing
    - 31st Operations Group
      - 57th Rescue Squadron, Aviano Air Base, Aviano, Italy

Air National Guard units

- 123rd Special Tactics Squadron, Louisville IAP/Louisville ANGB, Kentucky (Kentucky Air National Guard)
- 125th Special Tactics Squadron, Portland IAP/Portland ANGB, Oregon (Oregon Air National Guard)

== History ==
=== Pathfinders during World War II ===
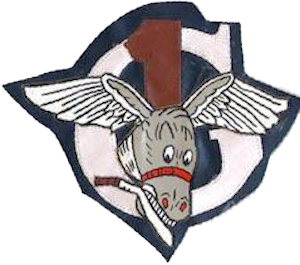
Emblem of the USAAF 1st Air Commando Group

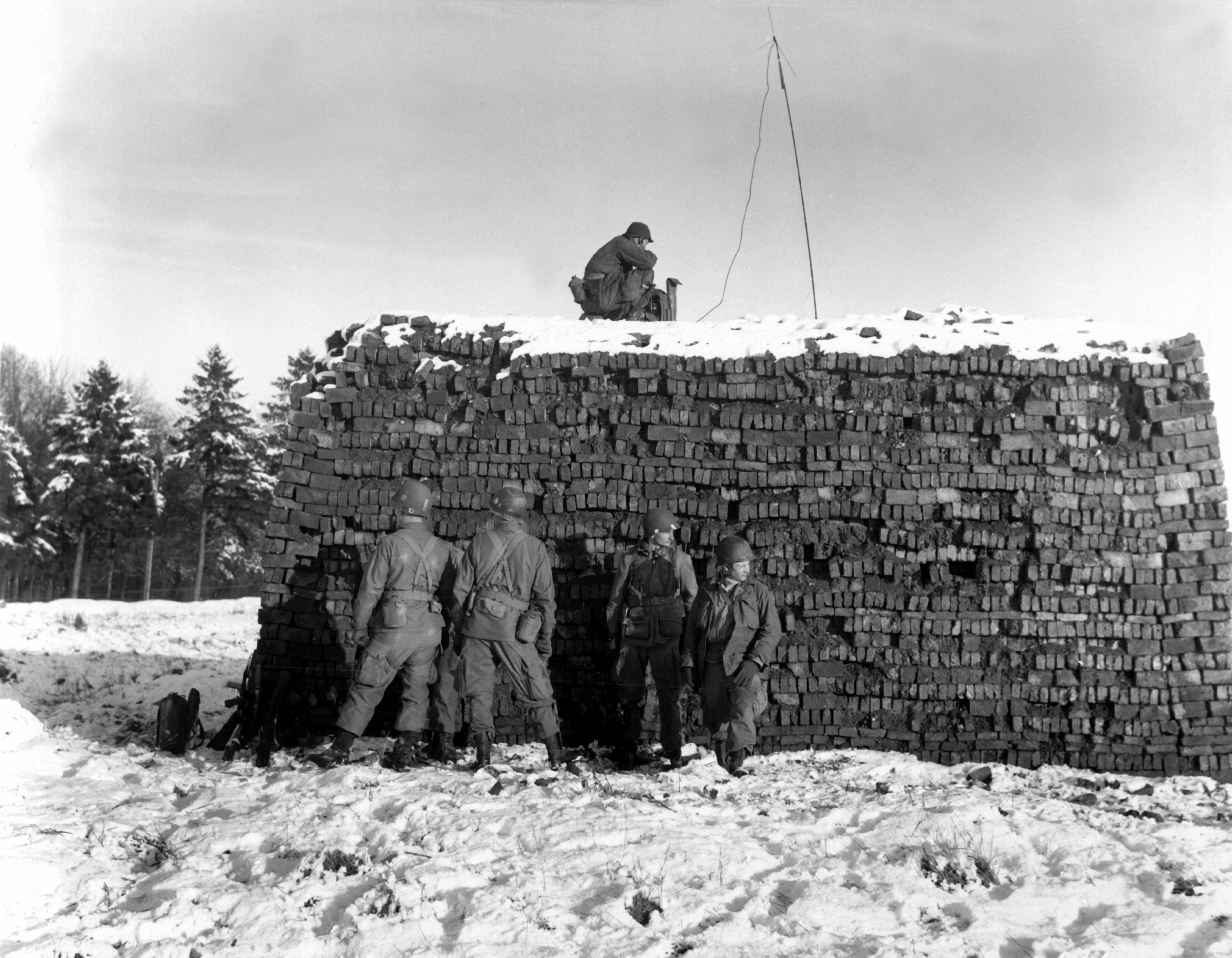
The 101st Airborne Division's pathfinder unit setting up radar equipment during the Battle of the Bulge

United States Army pathfinders originated in 1943 during World War II out of need for accurate airdrops after several mishaps occurred in the airborne assault on the Sicilian city of Gela during the allied invasion of Sicily. The 82nd Airborne Division performed a nighttime airborne assault outside of Gela. Due to poor visual references and high winds exceeding 45 miles per hour (72 km/h) two battalions landed 30 miles from their drop zone and a third battalion landed over 55 miles from their drop zone. Undeterred by the flawed airdrop, the paratroopers were still able to hinder the German counterattack to allow for the allies' amphibious assault to gain a foothold on the beach.

General James M. Gavin, who was the Deputy Commander of the 82nd Airborne Division, created the Army Pathfinders to ensure airborne operations are more successful in getting the paratroopers at the designated drop zone. These pathfinders preceded main assault forces into objective areas and drop zones in teams to provide weather information and visual guidance to inbound aircraft through the use of high-powered lights, flares and smoke pots, burning buckets of gas-soaked sand and the Eureka beacon. The pathfinder teams consisted of eight to twelve pathfinders along with six soldiers who provided security for the pathfinders while they set up their equipment and aided paratroopers, gliders, and planes in reaching their designated drop zones. Pathfinders were first successfully used later in the Sicilian campaign. During the Normandy invasion pathfinders jumped in prior to the main airborne assault force and guided 13,000 paratroopers to their designated drop zones. Pathfinders were used during Operation Market Garden to secure several key bridges required for advancing allied ground units. During the Battle of the Bulge pathfinders enabled an aerial resupply of the 101st Airborne Division.

In a history of the 509th Parachute Infantry Battalion's wartime actions titled Stand in the Door! The Wartime History of the 509th Parachute Infantry, authors and 509th veterans Charles H. Doyle and Terrell Stewart provided an alternative history on how the first U.S. Army pathfinder unit was formed.

General James Gavin likes to claim credit for "inventing" Pathfinders, pointing to bad drops in Sicily as the cause. Let us set the record straight: The 509th, the world's most experienced bad drop specialists, first saw the need for them. Pathfinders were separate teams of "advance men" who jumped in ahead of main forces to set up beacons and other guides to incoming aircraft.

The 509th's Scout Company was the first specialized Pathfinder group. In the U.S. Army, it started the training and experimentation necessary to develop the concept at Oujda. With fragments of practical knowledge from the British Airborne, company commander Captain Howland and his XO 1st Lt. Fred E. Perry worked hard to develop usable techniques. Perry recalls: "Everyone knew through hard experience that the Air Corps needed help to drop us on the correct drop zone. We organized the Scout Company for this purpose. This was later made into a Scout Platoon under my command, consisting of 10 enlisted and myself. We were equipped with a British homing radio and U.S. Navy Aldis lamps, which radiated a beam to guide planes. We trained on this procedure until the invasion at Salerno.

In the meantime, the 82d Airborne Division arrived from the States on 10 May and camped near the 509th at Oujda. We were attached to them. The 82d would not buy our Scout Platoon idea, but they sure found out in a hurry after Sicily that we really had something that was needed.

At the time, Major General Matthew Ridgway and his "All-American" staff thought they knew it all. Impressed with themselves, although they were not jumpers or experienced glider troopers, they airily dismissed the 509th and its fresh combat experiences, as well as any nonstandard/Limey concept. They would learn the hard way.

The pathfinders in the Pacific campaign operated slightly differently than their European pathfinder counterparts and pioneered a number of military "firsts". President Franklin D. Roosevelt, amidst the Quebec Conference in August 1943, was impressed by British General Orde Wingate's account of what could be accomplished in Burma with proper air support. To comply with Roosevelt's proposed air support for British long range penetration operations in Burma, the United States Army Air Forces created the 5318th Air Unit to support the Chindits. In March 1944, they were designated the 1st Air Commando Group by USAF General Hap Arnold. Arnold chose Colonel John R. Alison and Colonel Philip Cochran as co-commanders of the Air Commando Group.

In 1944 the strategy decided upon by the allied forces for the Burma Campaign consisted of fortified compounds inside Japanese territory due to increasing large Japanese patrols along the border. This change was in part forced upon them by strengthened Japanese patrols along the Burmese frontier, making a repeat of the successful infiltration in 1943 unlikely. In an imaginative move prompted by Colonel Philip Cochran's assurance that he could transport both troops and supplies by glider, Wingate arranged for the bulk of the force to enter Burma by air, greatly accelerating the force's ability to reach its target objectives. The pathfinders would land in gliders in preselected open fields in Burma, and prepare them for large-scale landings by transport aircraft. The air support provided by Cochran and Alison proved critical to the success of the operation. In three months, 600 sorties by Dakota transport aircraft transferred 9,000 troops, 1,300 pack animals and 245 tons of supplies to landing zones across Burma. Many of the soldiers who would later fight in Operation Thursday. The Air Commandos in Burma would achieve numerous military "firsts" such as; ground forces coordinating air strikes via radio, medevacing wounded by air. When the Burma road was reopened in January 1945 the Air Commandos were inactivated in preparation for the invasion of mainland Japan.

The term "Combat Control Team" comes from World War II where allied troop-carrier squadrons developed gliderborne teams called Combat Control Teams. A Combat Control Team consisted of one glider pilot and four enlisted technicians. They utilized a jeep and a trailer-mounted radio to pass critical information to aircraft. The first time they were used was during Operation Varsity in 1945, when two teams with the 18th Airborne Corps infiltrated German lines. They established forward airfields where they supported resupply operations and provided airfield control.

=== Korean War and birth of USAF CCTs ===
When the U.S. Air Force became a separate service in 1947, Air Force pathfinders were assigned to a provisional Pathfinder Squadron. The Air Force looked for ways to get rid of pathfinders, believing that electronic navigation aids could replace them and the pathfinders role became increasingly neglected by the Air Force. During the Korean War pathfinders were only used in the three main airdrops early in the war. Meanwhile, in Washington D.C. the Air Force and Army leadership were at odds about which service would have ownership of the pathfinder mission. The Department of Defense eventually sided with the Air Force having full control of all air traffic control duties. Despite the resolution the Army never inactivated their pathfinder units which has subsequently become more specialized towards helicopters. After the DOD sided with the Air Force being chosen for the pathfinder mission they expected six teams of pathfinders to be formed from Army-to-Air Force transfers but only got eleven men, enough to form one team. In 1953 the Pathfinder Squadron was discontinued and the pathfinder team was assigned to the 1st Aerial Port Squadron and officially designated a Combat Control Team. The Senior non-commissioned officer of this founding cadre was MSgt "Bull" Benini, he took the lead in establishing the team's new tactics, procedures, organization, and logistics requirements.

The Army and Air Force remained at odds regarding pathfinder and CCT roles. In August 1953 the 10th Special Forces Group refused to allow CCTs to join in their joint tactical missions held at Dobbins AFB, Georgia. As a result, Tactical Air Command stopped all Army airlift missions until the Army allowed the CCTs to take part.

While the career field was still young and lacking in manpower from so few Army pathfinder transfers, Air Force headquarters solicited from the radio maintenance career field for more Combat Controllers. It was also stipulated that Combat Controllers would have to attend air traffic control school if they would be controlling aircraft from the ground. Because of their job, Combat Controllers had to have either an air traffic control AFSC or a radio maintenance AFSC in addition to jump school to become a Combat Controller. This gave rise to blousing trousers and wearing paratrooper boots, a tradition that still exists to the present.

The first time a Combat Control Team was utilized was during the 1958 Lebanon crisis to combat communist expansion and bolster the pro-Western Lebanese government.

=== Vietnam War ===
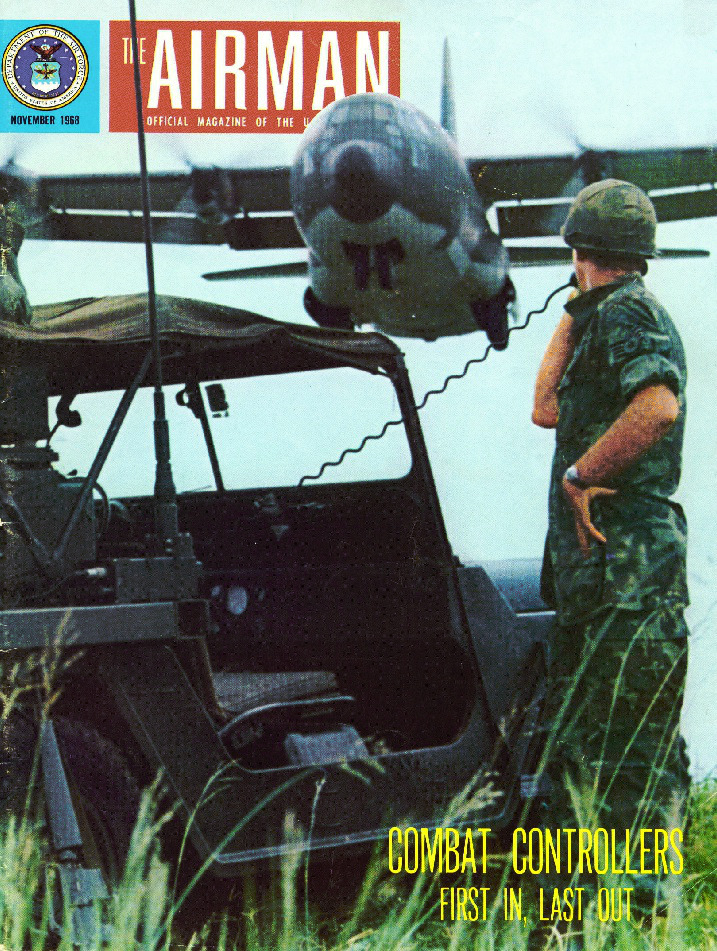
Combat Controllers in the Vietnam War on the cover of a 1968 issue of Airman Magazine

As tactical air strikes began to be used in Laos during the Vietnam War, it became apparent that, for the safety of noncombatants, some means of control was necessary. Beginning at least as early as July 1964, the absence of a close air support control system caused a variety of enterprising individuals to improvise procedures for marking bombing targets. At various times, ground markers (including bamboo arrows) and dropped smoke grenades were used. While some of these individuals had military training, such as U.S. Army attaché, others had little or no specialized training in close air support. They varied in nationality, being Thai, Lao, or Hmong, as well as American. Both Continental Air Services, Inc and Air America pilots would sometimes serve as ad hoc forward air controllers.

Later, trained Combat Controllers helped ensure mission safety and expedited air traffic flow during countless airlifts. Combat Controllers also flew as forward air guides in support of indigenous forces in Laos and Cambodia and conducted covert forward air control for U.S. and allied aircraft performing interdiction missions against Communist troops and supplies on the Ho Chi Minh trail. The first combat controller killed in action in SE Asia was TSgt Richard L. Foxx, a seasoned combat controller with more than 15 years experience. On 15 October 1962, Sergeant Foxx was killed while performing Forward Air Control (FAC) duties in a U-10 Helio Courier.

Development of rules of engagement by the Embassy also threw more reliance on increased control over the in-country close air support. So did the introduction of an integrated close air support system for Southeast Asia in April 1966. Beginning in April 1966, as part of its effort to better direct air strikes, the U. S. Air Force installed four tactical air navigation systems in Laos to guide U. S. air strikes. One of these was emplaced on a mountain top at Lima Site 85, aimed across the border at Hanoi, and was the site of a desperate battle in 1968.

The largest single loss of life during the war was on 4 September 1967. Four Combat Controllers, MSgt Charles A. Paradise, TSgt Frederick L. Thrower, Airman 1st Class Gerard Louis Gauthier Jr, and Airman 1st Class William E Jerkins (all of 8th Aerial Port Squadron Combat Control Team 3) and seven other airmen were killed in action when their C-123 crashed.

==== Butterflies ====
To begin an operation of great secrecy, the U. S. Air Force originally forwarded four sergeants from Combat Control Teams in 1963. These sergeants turned in their uniforms and military identification and were supplied with false identification so they could work in civilian clothing. This process was designed to preserve the fiction of American non-involvement dubbed plausible deniability. Once "civilianized", the Butterflies flew in the right (co-pilot's) seat in Air America Helio Couriers and Pilatus Porters. They were often accompanied by a Lao or Thai interpreter in the back seat. The Air Commando sergeants directed the air strikes according to U. S. Air Force doctrine, using the radio call sign Butterfly.

Two of the Butterfly Air Force combat controllers were Master Sergeant Charles Larimore Jones, soon joined by Technical Sergeant James J. Stanford. Another of the Butterflies was Major John J. Garrity, Jr., who in future would spend several years as the éminence grise of the American Embassy to Laos. They, and their successors, ran air strikes without notice or objection until General William Momyer discovered that enlisted men were in charge of air strikes; at that point, he ordered their replacement with rated fighter pilots. By that time, the number of Butterflies had escalated to three pairs. Both the impromptu strike controlling and the Butterfly effort ended with General Momyer's tirade in April 1966.

Airman 2nd Class Andre R. Guillet, a "Butterfly" forward air controller, was listed as MIA on 18 May 1966 when the O-1 Bird Dog he and pilot Captain Lee Dufford Harley were in was shot down over Laos.

=== Post–Vietnam War ===
As a result of the Iran hostage crisis, US President Jimmy Carter ordered a rescue mission, code named Operation Eagle Claw, to retrieve the 52 diplomats held captive at the embassy of the United States, Tehran. Three weeks prior to the operation, Air Force CCT Major John T. Carney Jr. was flown in by Twin Otter to Desert One, a staging area in the South Khorasan Province of Iran, near Tabas for a clandestine survey of an airstrip. Despite his two CIA pilots' casual approach to the mission, Carney successfully surveyed the airstrip, installed remotely operated infrared lights and a strobe to outline a landing pattern for pilots, and took soil samples to determine the load-bearing properties of the desert surface. At that time, the floor was hard-packed sand, but in the ensuing three weeks, an ankle-deep layer of powdery sand was deposited by sandstorms. (Note: The "box four and one" pattern acted like a gun sight, with the distant fifth light at the end of the runway lined up in the center of the near four lights positioned at the approach end. The box provided a touchdown area and the far light marked the end of the rollout area.) Operation Eagle Claw commenced on 24 April 1980 but encountered many obstacles due to technical issues and weather which led to an accident that killed 8 service members. As a result, the mission aborted. Its failure, and the humiliating public debacle that ensued, damaged US prestige worldwide.

Three years later, Carney, now a lieutenant colonel, was again picked for a high-risk, clandestine, special operation mission two days in advance of the US-led invasion of Grenada. Carey was the ranking officer of a team of Air Force Combat Controllers and Navy SEALs tasked with conducting a reconnaissance of a new airport under construction at Point Salines on the southwestern tip of the Eastern Caribbean island. Their shared mission was to determine how the facility was defended and whether the unfinished runway would support the weight of America military transport planes. They would also set up navigation beacons to guide the transports to the target. On 23 Oct. 1983, a nighttime parachute rendezvous of the SEALs with the four controllers waiting aboard the USS Clifton Sprague off the Grenada coast went awry in bad weather. The weather as well as faulty planning, inadequate equipment and training, and bad luck contributed to the drowning deaths of four of the arriving SEALs. The surviving 20-member joint team made two attempts to reach the island by small boat from the Navy frigate over successive nights, but both attempts were thwarted by more bad weather, bad luck, and equipment problems. The pre-invasion reconnaissance was eventually conducted by an Air Force AC-130 from the air instead.

On D-Day, 25 October 1983, other Combat Controllers jumped into Point Salines at the start of Operation Urgent Fury. They were key to opening the airway for 1st Battalion & 2nd Battalion, 75th Rangers to take the unfinished airport.

=== Twenty-first century ===
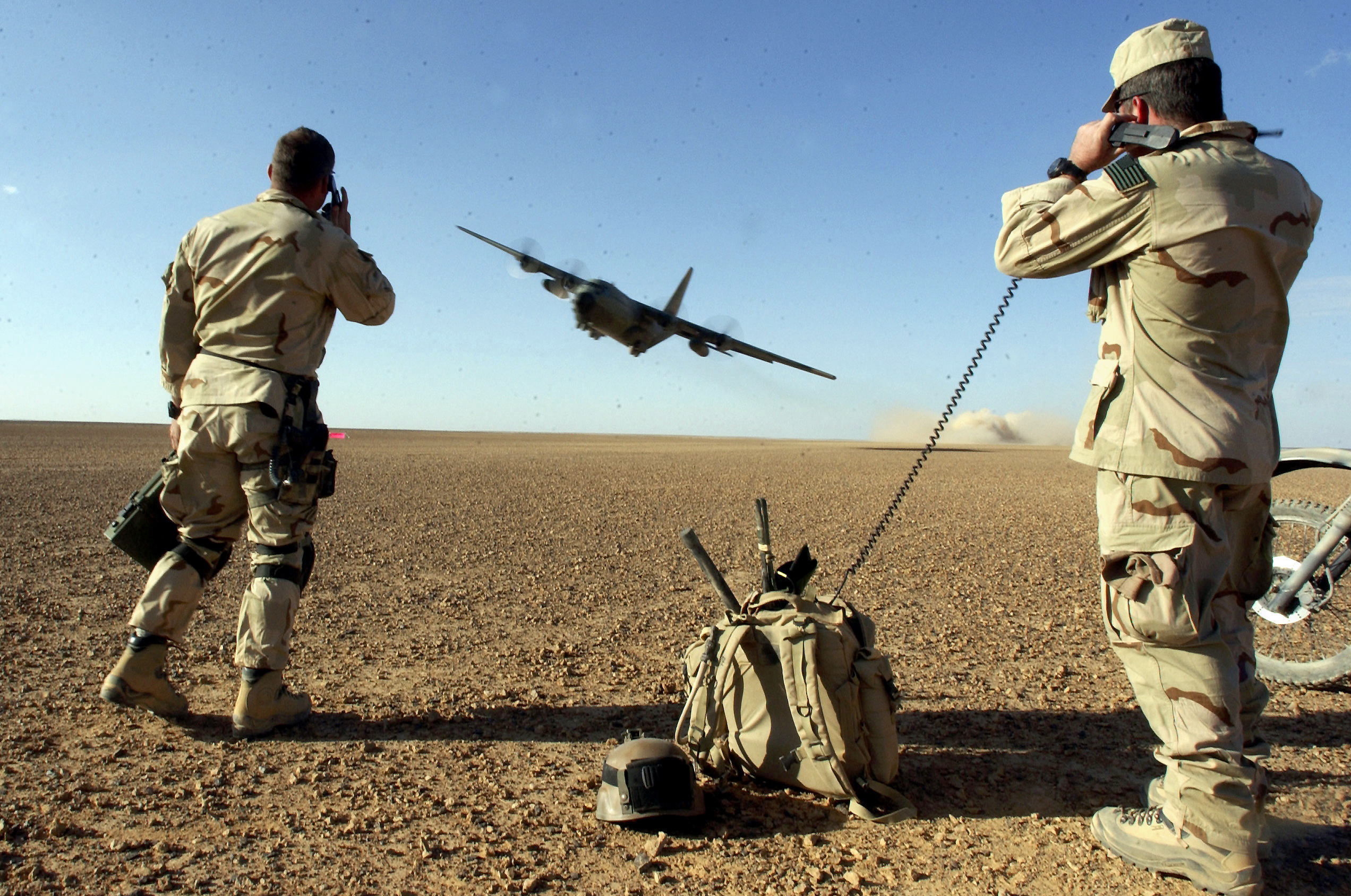
Air Force Combat Controllers participating in Operation Enduring Freedom provide air traffic control to a C-130 taking off from a remote airfield.

In 2004 Secretary of Defense Donald Rumsfeld stated "some 85 percent of the air strikes in Operation Enduring Freedom were called in by Air Force Combat Controllers." Combat Controllers have received three of the five awarded Air Force Crosses since the September 11 attacks; they were awarded in 2002, 2008, and 2013 during the American War in Afghanistan.

On 6 October 2009 12 Combat Controllers and Pararescuemen began an 812-mile trek across the Southern U.S. called the Tim Davis/Special Tactics Memorial March. The march was in remembrance of Special Tactics airmen who lost their lives since the "war on terror" began and to increase awareness about the Special Operations Warrior Foundation. The Foundation funds the education of surviving children of Special Operations personnel who are killed in action or training. The march began at the Medina annex on Lackland Air Force Base, Texas where the Combat Control career field begins and finished at Hurlburt Field, Florida where they graduate from Advanced Skills Training and become full-fledged Combat Controllers. The airmen marched in two-man teams for 24 hours each carrying 50 lb ruck sacks. The march was completed just ten days later.

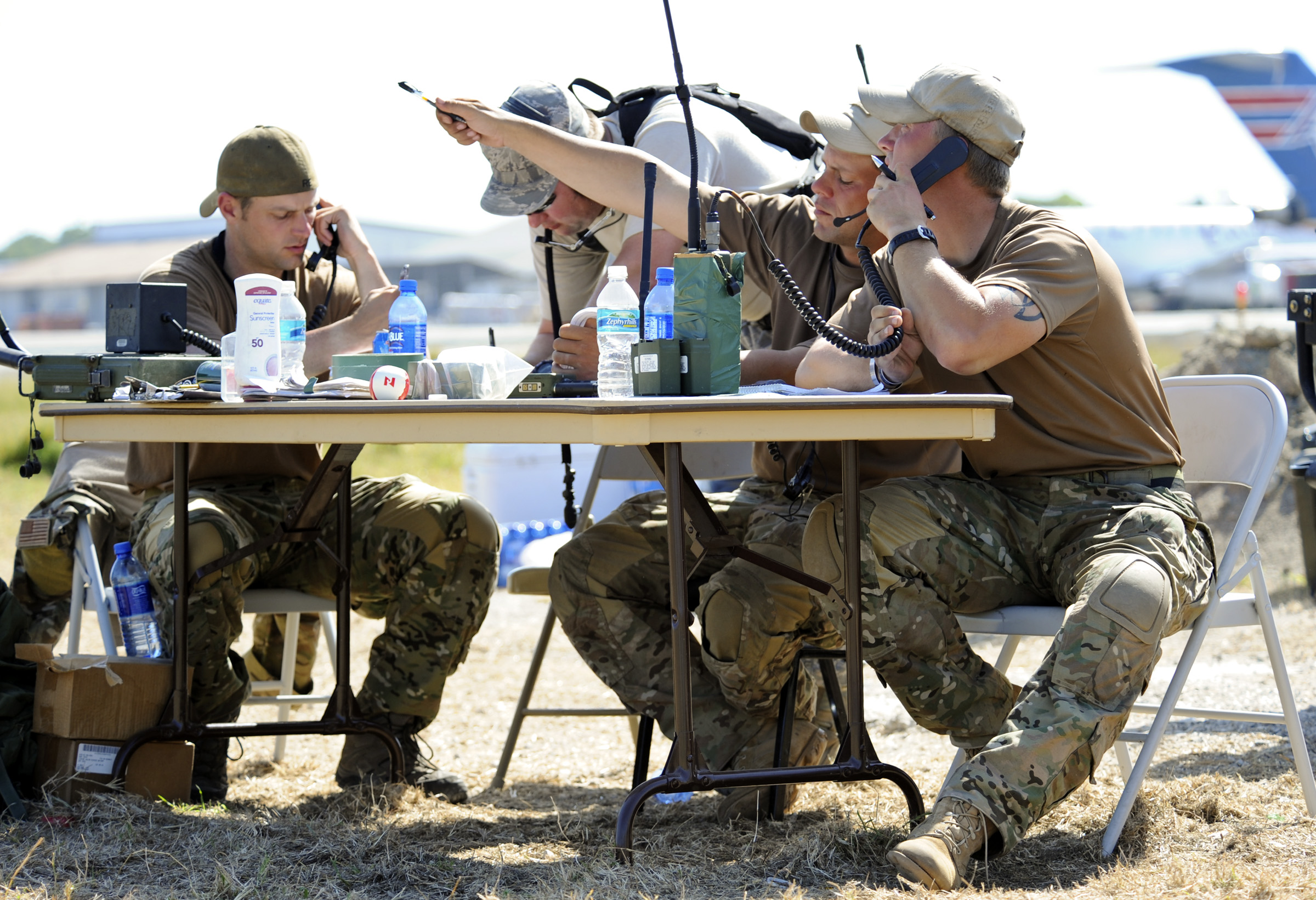
Combat Controllers directing air traffic at Toussaint Louverture International Airport in Port-au-Prince, Haiti during the relief efforts of Operation Unified Response.

As part of Operation Unified Response, within 24 hours of the 2010 Haiti earthquake, a team of Combat Controllers from the 23rd Special Tactics Squadron stationed at Hurlburt Field, Florida arrived at Toussaint Louverture International Airport in Port-au-Prince, Haiti. 28 minutes after arriving, the Combat Controllers assumed authority of air traffic control duties to allow planes carrying humanitarian aid to land safely. The Combat Controllers directed over 2,500 flights without incident from a card table using only hand radios. Under their direction planes were able to take off and land every five minutes, bringing in over 4 million pounds of supplies. As a result of their efforts, the team leader of the Combat Controllers, Chief Master Sergeant Tony Travis, was later recognized as one of Time Magazine's 100 most influential people of 2010.

Again in late 2011, 18 CCTs and PJs made the trek from Lackland AFB to Hurlburt Field after losing three airman when their Chinook was shot down in 2011. The airmen walked for 24 hours at a time in three person groups each carrying 50 lb ruck sacks; by the end of the trip the average airman had marched 144 miles.

In June 2014, Combat Controllers were deployed to Iraq as part of the contingent of U.S. military advisors ordered to the country by President Barack Obama in the military effort against the Islamic State of Iraq and the Levant.

Former commander of United States Special Operations Command, General Bryan D. Brown, commented on Combat Controllers in a May 2011 interview with the publication, The Year in Special Operations 2011–2012 Edition, stating: "During this kind of warfare [after the September 11 attacks] the USAF combat controller [CCT/TAC-P] guys really carried an incredible load. During the opening days in Afghanistan, we deployed some SF teams without a CCT, and the difference between those that had controllers and those that didn't was dramatic. Quite frankly no one wants to go to war without them. They are admired, capable, and requested at a rate far greater than we could ever provide. Their efforts were critical in the early days of OEF and still are. Here is another force [whose] true impact on the battlefields around the world will never be known or appreciated. They are absolutely phenomenal."

== Notable Combat Controllers ==
- CMSgt Bull Benini, the first Combat Controller, developed the organization, standards, tactics of a Combat Control Team.
- Warrant Officer Charles Larimore Jones (14 May 1932 – 23 November 2006), also known as Charlie Jones, was an architect of the U.S. Air Force's forward air control doctrine, as well as one of its early practitioners during the Laotian Civil War. He was trained in forward air control techniques as a Combat Controller in 1954. In 1962, he was one of the Operation Jungle Jim volunteers who reestablished the Air Commandos. He was the first Combat Controller committed solely to support the U.S. Army Special Forces and later also participated in the covert "Butterfly" program, directing airstrikes into Laos and Cambodia. Based on his experience, in 1963 he was assigned to Hurlburt Field to write the field manual on forward air control while expanding the Combat Controller curriculum.
- Technical Sergeant James J. Stanford was a pioneer during the Vietnam war who also helped reestablish Combat Controller techniques
- Master Sergeant John A. Chapman posthumously received the Medal of Honor for his actions during the Battle of Takur Ghar in 2002. During the battle, he expertly coordinated air support for cover and extraction of wounded personnel. He later volunteered to join a rescue team which returned for a missing teammate. Despite being wounded multiple times in the subsequent firefight, he destroyed one enemy position and continued to advance on a second until he was incapacitated. His actions allowed his embattled teammates to break contact, saving multiple lives. Drone imagery later showed that he appeared to still be alive an hour later and re-engaged the enemy, neutralizing multiple combatants, including one in hand-to-hand combat before finally succumbing to his wounds. He was the first airman to receive the Medal of Honor since the Vietnam War. On 8 April 2005, the Navy cargo ship Merlin was renamed the MV TSgt John A. Chapman (T-AK-323) in honor of him.
- Senior Airman Zachary Rhyner was the first living recipient of the Air Force Cross since the September 11 terrorist attacks. He was awarded the Air Force Cross for his actions while serving with the 21st Special Tactics Squadron during the Battle of Shok Valley on 6 April 2008 in Nuristan Province, Afghanistan. Despite being wounded early in the battle, he continued to fight and directed Close air support and Airstrikes totaling 4,570 cannon rounds, nine Hellfire missiles, 162 rockets, a dozen 500-pound bombs and one 2,000-pound bomb. As a result of the same battle ten U.S. Army soldiers, nine Special Forces and one Combat Cameraman, received the Silver Star. Ronald J. Shurer, a Special Forces medic, was awarded the Medal of Honor from his actions in this battle after a later review. In 2019, Matthew O. Williams, a Special Forces weapons sergeant also had his Silver Star upgraded to the Medal of Honor.
- Staff Sergeant Robert Gutierrez received the Air Force Cross in 2011 for his actions on 5 October 2009 during a battle in Herat province, Afghanistan. Gutierrez and the Special Forces team he was with had breached a compound but became pinned inside by heavy fire. Despite being wounded, he continued to engage the enemy until he was incapacitated by pain and a collapsed lung, the result of pneumothorax caused by his chest wound. A Special Forces medic was able to perform an emergency needle decompression, allowing him to breathe and narrowly call off a Hellfire strike near their position that likely would have killed his whole team. Donning his gear again, he continued to coordinate air assets including A-10 gun runs less than 65 feet from their position which enabled his team to exit the compound. Dogged by enemy fire, they moved two miles on foot before Gutierrez's lung collapsed again necessitating a second needle decompression. They held for an hour and a half until CASEVAC arrived for him, by which point he had lost 5.5 pints of blood. After being loaded onto the bird, he asked the pilot to give his team overwatch as they made their way back to base on foot before passing out. He was credited with saving the lives of nearly 30 American and Afghan forces. He was also present at the Battle of Shok Valley with Zachary Rhyner albeit with a different Special Forces team and reportedly said, "If it wasn't for Zach, I wouldn't be here." Gutierrez was a 2012 inductee to the Air Command and Staff College's Gathering of Eagles Program.
- Chief Master Sergeant Tony Travis was recognized as one of Time Magazine's 100 most influential people of 2010 due to his team's efforts in the aftermath of the 2010 Haiti earthquake which devastated much of Haiti. He took part in the first Tim Davis/Special Tactics Memorial March from San Antonio, Texas to Fort Walton Beach, Florida.
- Staff Sergeant Ashley Spurlin was a competitor on the History Channel TV show Top Shot during its second season. He also took part in the first Tim Davis/Special Tactics Memorial March.
- Staff Sergeant Scott Sather, a member of the 24th Special Tactics Squadron, was the first enlisted airman killed in action during Operation Iraqi Freedom. Camp Sather, a U.S. Air Force base on the west side of Baghdad International Airport, was named after him.
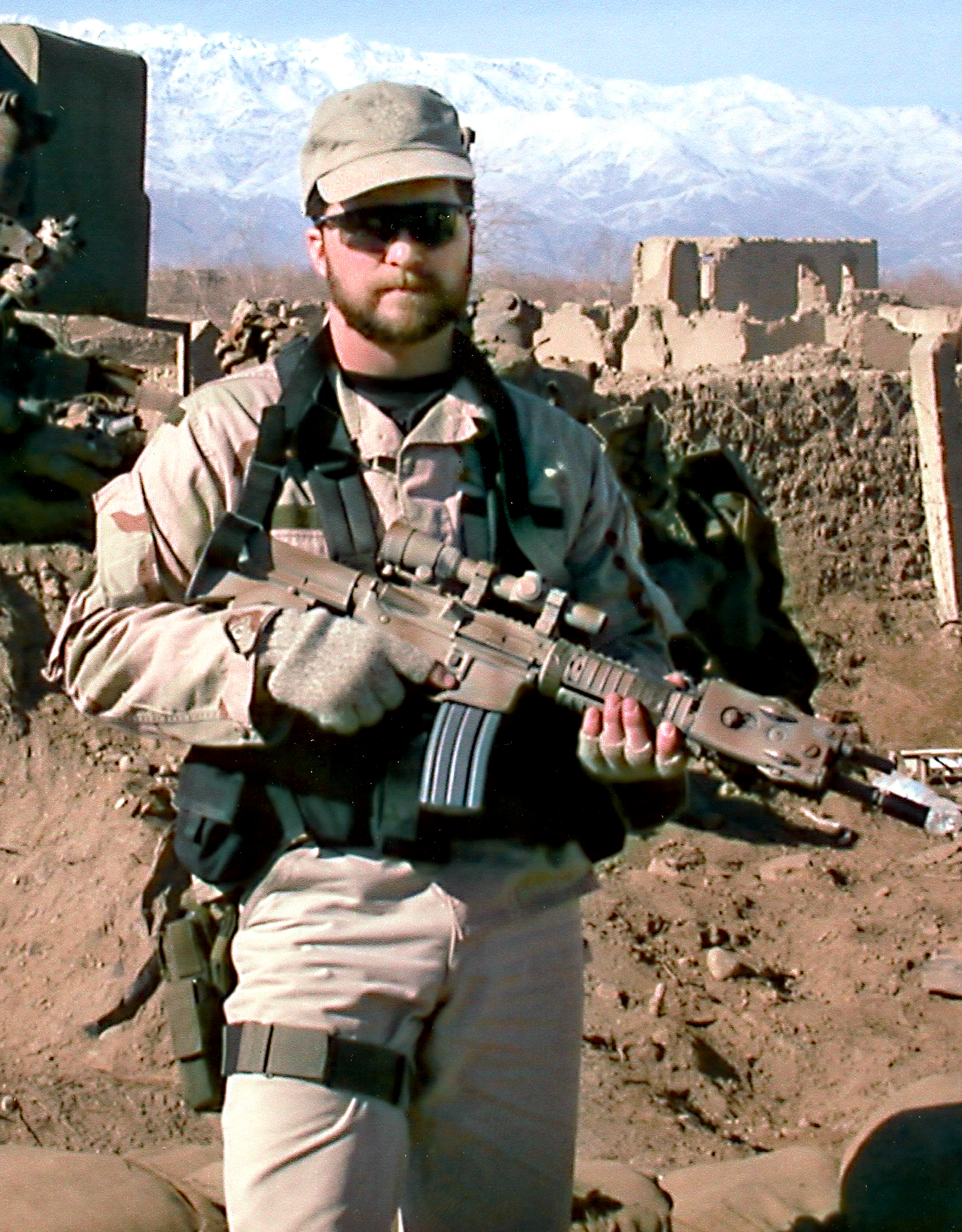
MSgt John A. Chapman in Afghanistan

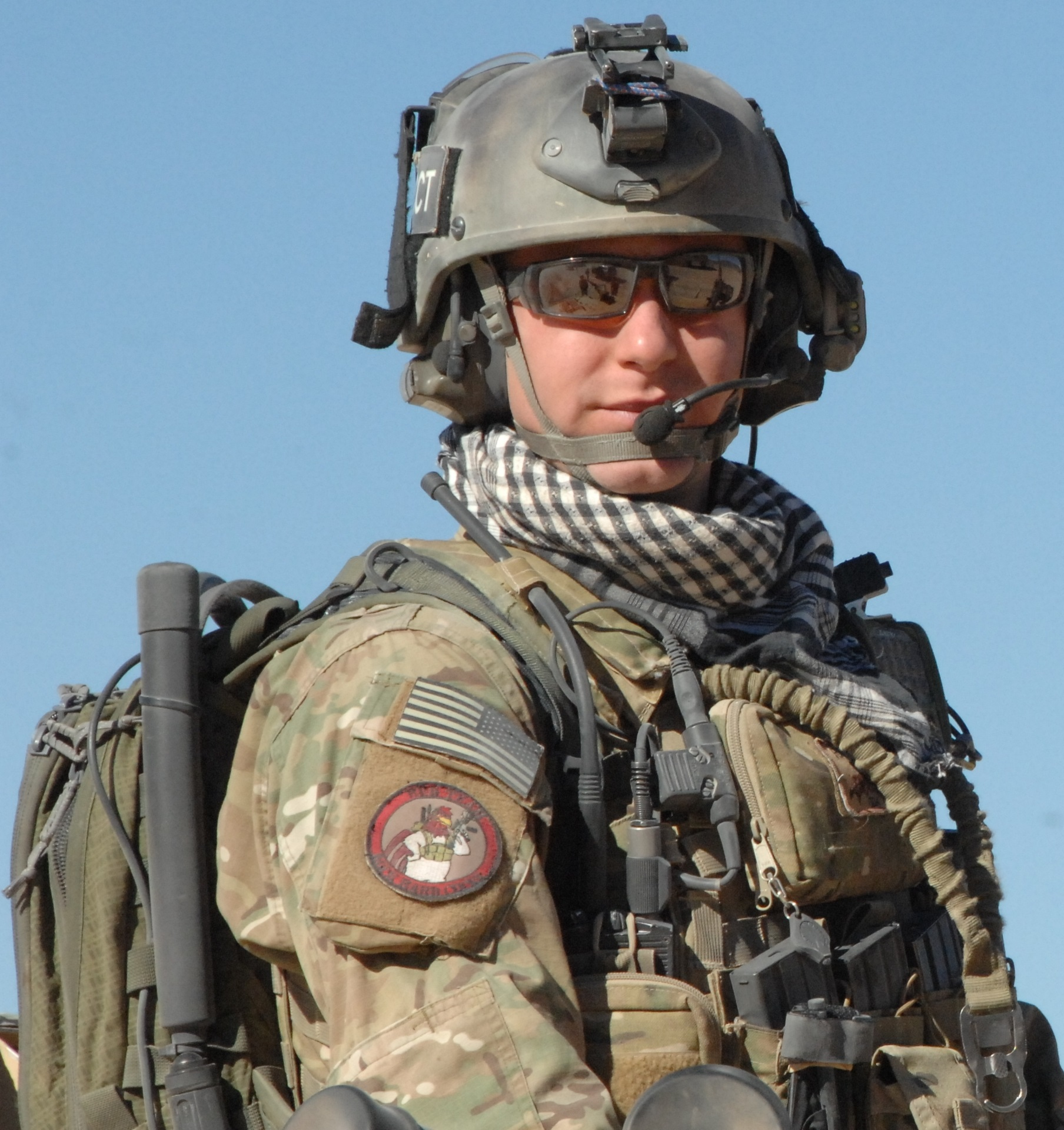
SrA Zachary Rhyner on patrol with an Army Special Forces team in Afghanistan.

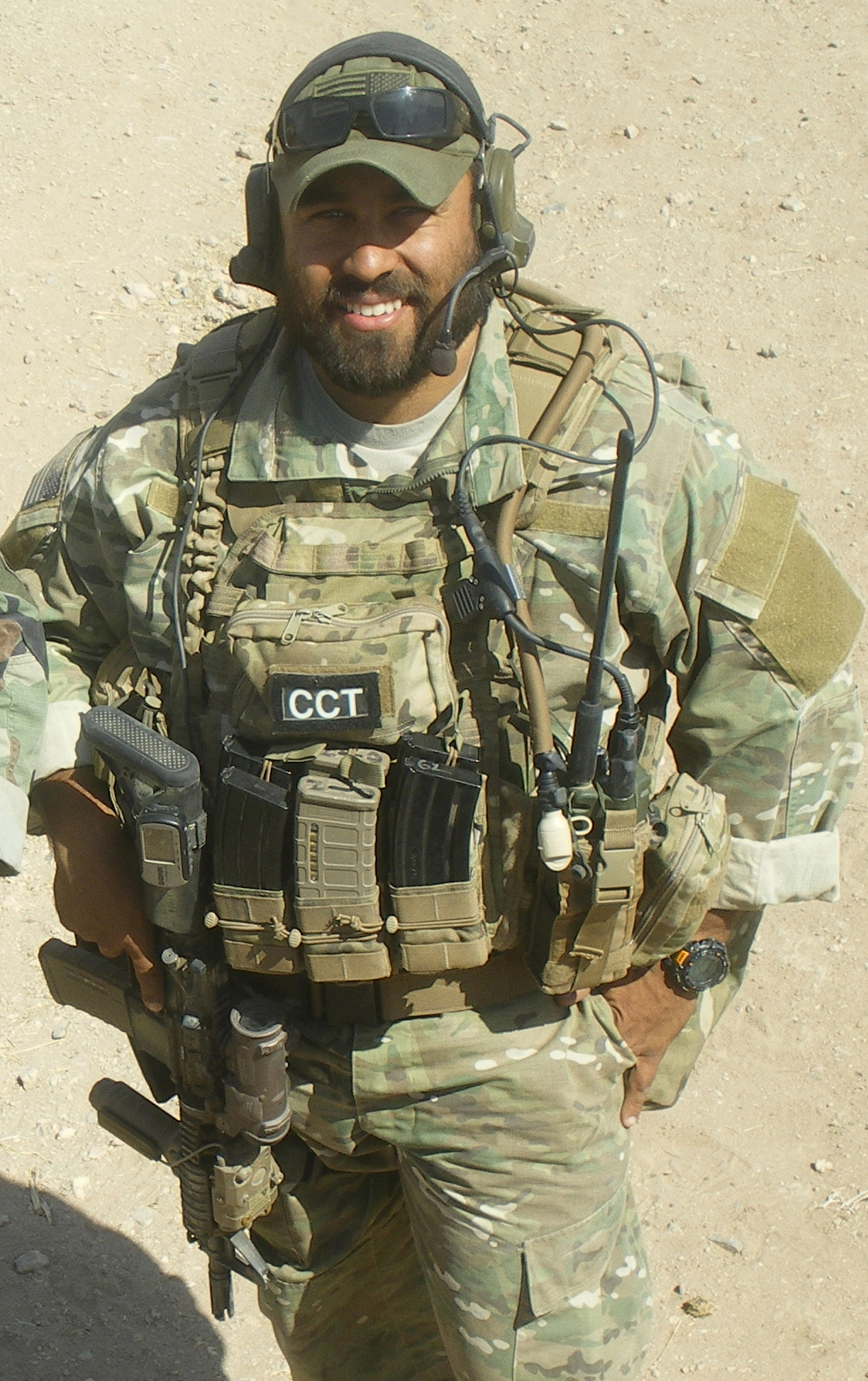
SSgt Robert Gutierrez in Afghanistan.

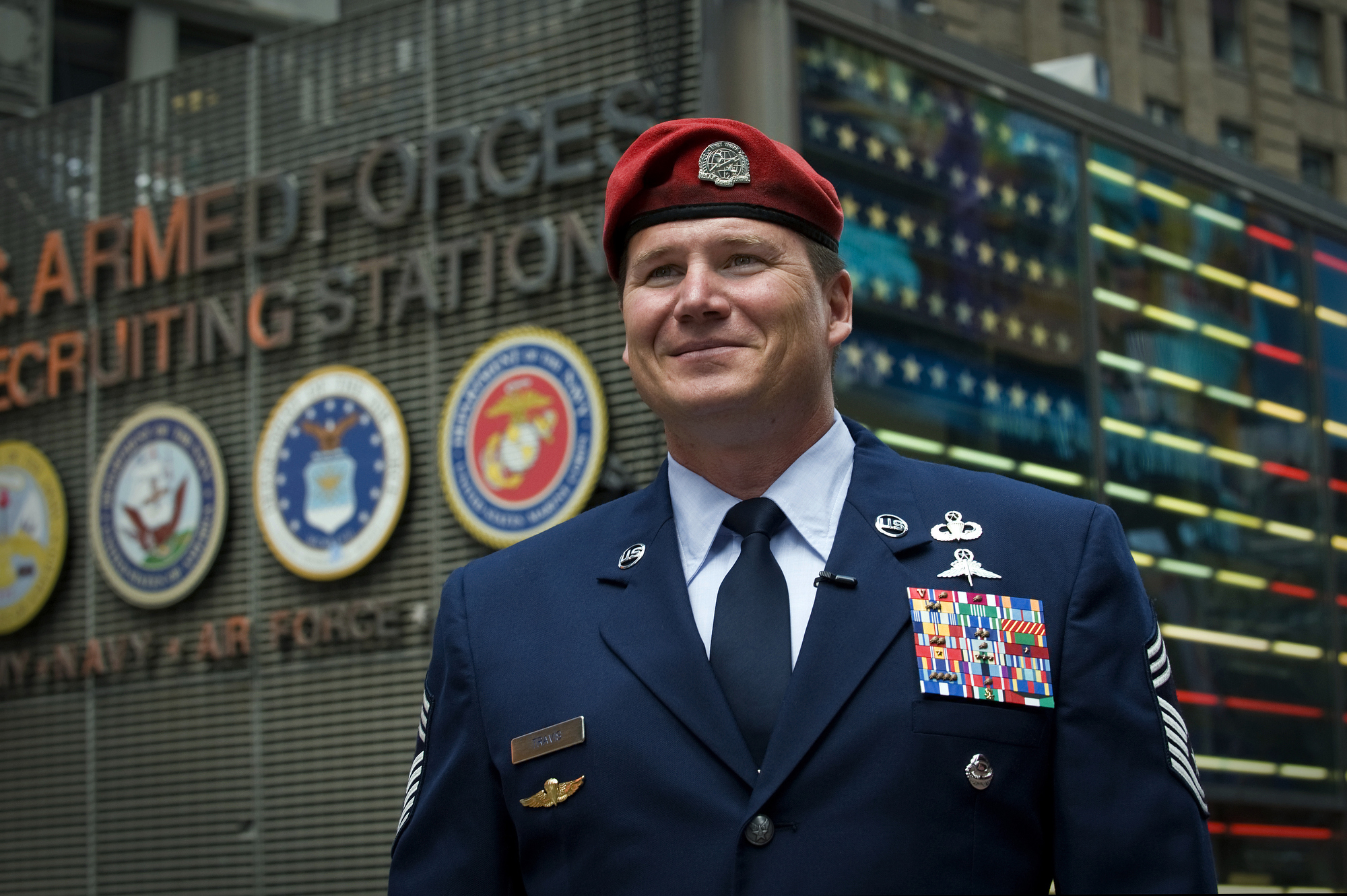
Chief Master Sergeant Tony Travis in 2010

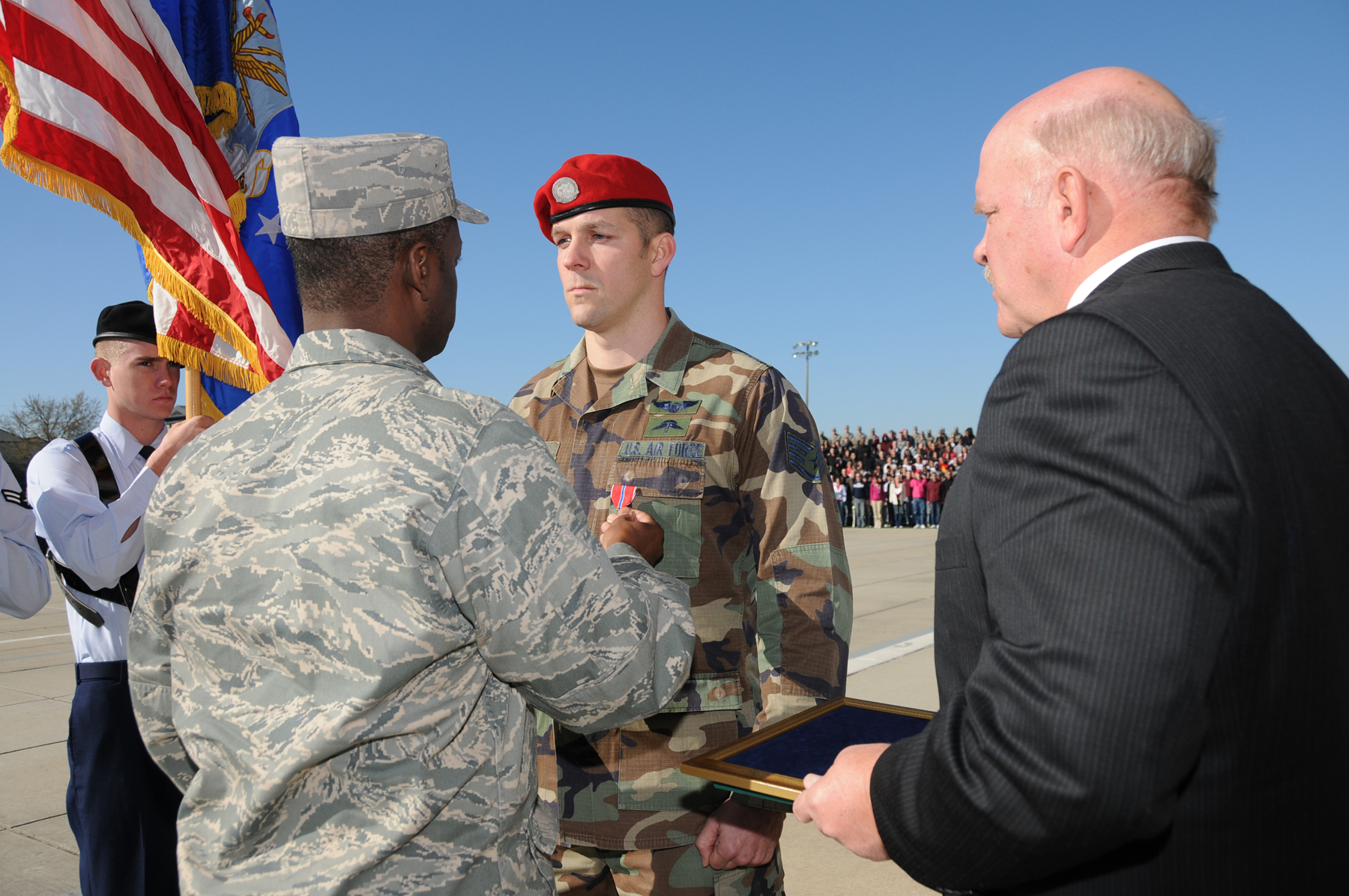
SSgt Ashley Spurlin receiving a Bronze Star in 2009

== CCT in popular culture ==
In the Transformers film franchise Tyrese Gibson plays a U.S. Air Force Combat Controller named Robert Epps. To play his part he was coached by Master Sergeant Ray Bolinger, a Combat Controller from the 22nd Special Tactics Squadron.

In the 2008 movie Eagle Eye, during the opening sequence an operator with a “CCT” shoulder tab can be seen directing a drone strike in Pakistan.

A class consisting of CCTs and PJs at the Air Force Combat Diver School was covered by Discovery Channel's program Surviving the Cut during season two, which originally aired 25 July 2011.

In 2012 Men's Health magazine featured an article titled The Special Operators you've never heard of where the author commented on the lack of public knowledge regarding Combat Controllers, "Let us face reality: the Navy SEALs get all the ink, the Army Rangers all the glory, the Marine Recons all the babes. Conversely, to the average guy on the street the mention of U.S. Air Force Special Operators inevitably elicits a look of bewilderment. The Air Force has those guys?"

In author Marko Kloos' Frontlines series of military science fiction books, the protagonist is a combat controller specializing in providing ground troops with space-based air support.

== See also ==
- United States Special Operations Forces
- United States Air Force Tactical Air Control Party
- United States Air Force Special Tactics Officer
