= Surviving the Cut =

- Country of origin: United States
- No. of seasons: 2
- No. of episodes: 12

Production
- Running time: 40–45 minutes

Original release
- Network: Discovery Channel
- Release: August 18, 2010 – August 26, 2011

Surviving the Cut was a military documentary/reality television series produced by 2 Roosters Media for the Discovery Channel. It portrays the rigorous training programs of various elite forces of the United States armed forces. Season two premiered on the Discovery Channel on July 11, 2011 and ended on August 26, 2011.

== Episodes ==
=== Season 1 ===
1. "Ranger School" (08/18/10)
2. "US Air Force Pararescue" (08/25/10)
3. "US Marine Recon" (09/01/10)
4. "Special Forces Divers" (09/08/10)
5. "Navy EOD Final Certification" (09/15/10)
6. "Marine Snipers" (09/22/10)

=== Season 2 ===
1. "Naval Special Warfare Combatant Craft Crewman" (07/11/11)
2. "US Army Sniper School" (07/18/11)
3. "US Air Force Special Operations Dive School" (07/25/11)
4. "US Army Sapper School" (08/12/11)
5. "US Army 160th SOAR (A)" (08/19/11)
6. "Naval Special Warfare Combatant Craft Crewman (CQT)" (08/26/11)

== See also ==
- SAS: Are You Tough Enough?
- SAS: Who Dares Wins (2015-)
