= Charles Larimore Jones =

American lawyer

Charles Larimore Jones (14 May 1932 – 23 November 2006), also known as Charlie Jones, was an architect of the U.S. Air Force's forward air control doctrine, as well as one of its early practitioners during the Laotian Civil War. He was trained in forward air control techniques as a Combat Controller in 1954. In 1962, he was one of the Operation Jungle Jim volunteers who reestablished the Air Commandos. He was the first Combat Controller committed solely to support the U.S. Army Special Forces. Based on his experience, in 1963 he was assigned to Hurlburt Field to write the field manual on forward air control while expanding the Combat Controller curriculum.

Jones deployed frequently in the next few years. On one of these deployments, he was one of the first pair of Combat Controllers clandestinely infiltrated into the Laotian Civil War, under the call sign Butterfly. He and James J. Stanford supplied the first rudiments of forward air control to Operation Steel Tiger and Operation Barrel Roll. When that assignment was superseded by Raven Forward Air Controllers, Jones returned stateside and transferred into the U.S. Army as a warrant officer to finish his military career with U.S. Special Forces in 1969. After retiring from the military, he earned a Ph.D. and a J.D., and became a college professor and attorney.

== Biography ==
As the Korean War began, 18-year-old Charles Larimore Jones joined the U.S. Air Force and underwent enlisted basic training. After training at Keesler Air Force Base in radar and electronics, he found himself ferrying troops and cargo within the Korean War Zone with the 6th Troop Carrier Squadron. Postwar, he returned to the United States and volunteered into the Air Force's Combat Control Team program in 1954. Following this, he transferred to Germany in 1956, assigned to support the U.S. Army's 11th Airborne Division, though not as a Combat Controller.

In 1962, Jones re-entered the Combat Control field, serving with the 62d Operations Group at McChord Air Force Base. Following this, he volunteered for Operation Jungle Jim, which re-established the Air Commandos. While with Jungle Jim, he was the first combat controller dedicated to duty in the Vietnam War with the U.S. Army Special Forces. Jones directed air strikes by Air Commando North American T-28 Trojans and Douglas A-26 Invaders in both the Cà Mau Peninsula and the central highlands of South Vietnam. He was also purportedly the first individual to fire the new AR-15 rifle in combat, while on patrol against the Viet Cong in late 1962.

In 1963, he was assigned to Hurlburt Field to help write the field manual for forward air control operations. He was then charged with running the schooling for Combat Controllers; he added Scuba diving, HALO jumps, and medical training into the Air Commando curriculum. As part of special teams, he deployed to Panama, Greece, Iran, Germany, France, and Italy. In 1965, he and the First Air Commando Wing transferred to England Air Force Base, Louisiana.

In 1966, Master Sergeant Jones and Technical Sergeant James J. Stanford were assigned as the first Butterfly Forward Air Controllers in the Kingdom of Laos to fight in the Laotian Civil War. Serving in civilian clothing and flying in civilian aircraft contracted to the Central Intelligence Agency, Jones flew over 400 combat missions in the "Secret War". His usual call sign was Butterfly 44. As part of this duty, he had the forward air control manual he helped create translated into both Lao and Thai.

His working conditions were far from ideal. With no military aircraft available, Jones cadged rides in a civilian Pilatus Porter or some other craft of Air America and Continental Air Services. With use of marking rocketry forbidden, a Butterfly FAC sometimes depended on dropped smoke grenades to mark targets. Alternatively, he simply talked the strike aircraft onto the target. The need for an interpreter to contact friendly Royal Lao Army troops under attack complicated matters. Bad weather in North Vietnam caused unplanned diversions of American fighter-bombers that overtaxed Butterfly resources to the point the Butterfly flight would run out of fuel and have to land dead stick to gas up. Jones directed at least 700 air strike sorties during his tour in Laos—perhaps as many as 1,000. He soon gained the nickname "Super FAC". Operation Barrel Roll, Operation Steel Tiger, and the succeeding air campaigns in Laos that Jones pioneered would eventually drop approximately the same amount of ordnance used in all the World War II bombings—2,093,210 tons of bombs. By the war's end, an estimated 20% of the Laotian citizenry had become internal refugees, partly because of the bombing.

In 1967, Jones returned to England Air Force Base for promotion to Senior Master Sergeant. He then transferred to the U.S. Army Special Forces as a warrant officer, and served the Green Berets as an operations officer at Fort Bragg. He then deployed a final time for 1968–1969, returning to III Corps in South Vietnam to run communications for every Green Beret A Team in the Corps. Upon return from this posting, he retired from the military at Fort Benning, Georgia.

He began a new career as an Alabama state agent enforcing drug and alcohol laws. At night he went to college. He earned every level of college degree—an Associate of Science, a Bachelor of Science, Master of Science, and Doctorate of Philosophy. He also earned a Juris Doctor at the Thomas Goode Jones School of Law of Faulkner University (at the time, Alabama Christian College). He became a member of both the Alabama Bar, and he was admitted to practice before the U.S. Supreme Court and other federal courts.

== Honors and awards ==
=== Military honors ===
- Two Distinguished Flying Crosses
- Two Bronze Stars
- Multiple Air Medals
- Purple Heart
- Syngman Rhee Presidential Citation
- Vietnamese Cross of Gallantry with Palm
- Commendation Medals
- Paratroop wings from Germany, Iran, Greece, South Vietnam

=== Professional appointments and memberships ===
- Inducted into the USAF Air Commando Hall of Fame
- Inducted into Kappa Delta Pi and Alpha Phi Sigma Honor Societies
- Chairman, Academic Senate, Troy State University
- Alabama Peace Officers Association
- Alabama Criminal Justice Educators Association
- USAF Combat Control Association
- USAF Air Commando Association
