= Cancer Moonshot =

Cancer Moonshot may refer to:

- Cancer Breakthroughs 2020, a privately funded project started in January 2016
- Beau Biden Cancer Moonshot, funded by the U.S. government under a law passed in December 2016
