= Shooting at the Moon (book) =

1996 book by Roger Warner

- Author: Roger Warner
- Publisher: Steerforth Press
- Publication date: 1996

Shooting at the Moon: The Story of America's Clandestine War in Laos was written by Southeast Asian war historian, Roger Warner. It is about the Central Intelligence Agency's and US military's involvement in Laos from in the early 1961 through 1973, and this incursion's influence on the later Vietnam War (1960–1975).

Published by Steerforth Press in 1996, it was a winner of the Cornelius Ryan Award for 1995's Best Book on Foreign Affairs by the Overseas Press Club. It was published previously in a slightly different version by Simon & Schuster under the title Backfire: The CIA's Secret War in Laos and Its Link to the War in Vietnam. Shooting at the Moon explores how this "perfect" covert war ballooned into a sorrowful and disturbing ending. (The book's title refers to the Laotian practice of firing weapons during a lunar eclipse in order to scare off the giant frog in the heavens, which, in Laotian mythology, is swallowing the moon.) It was reviewed in the Los Angeles Times, which said that "it can only add to our understanding how strong men and their convictions and their daring so often lead to calamity, especially for those who believe and follow them."
