= 522nd Special Operations Squadron =

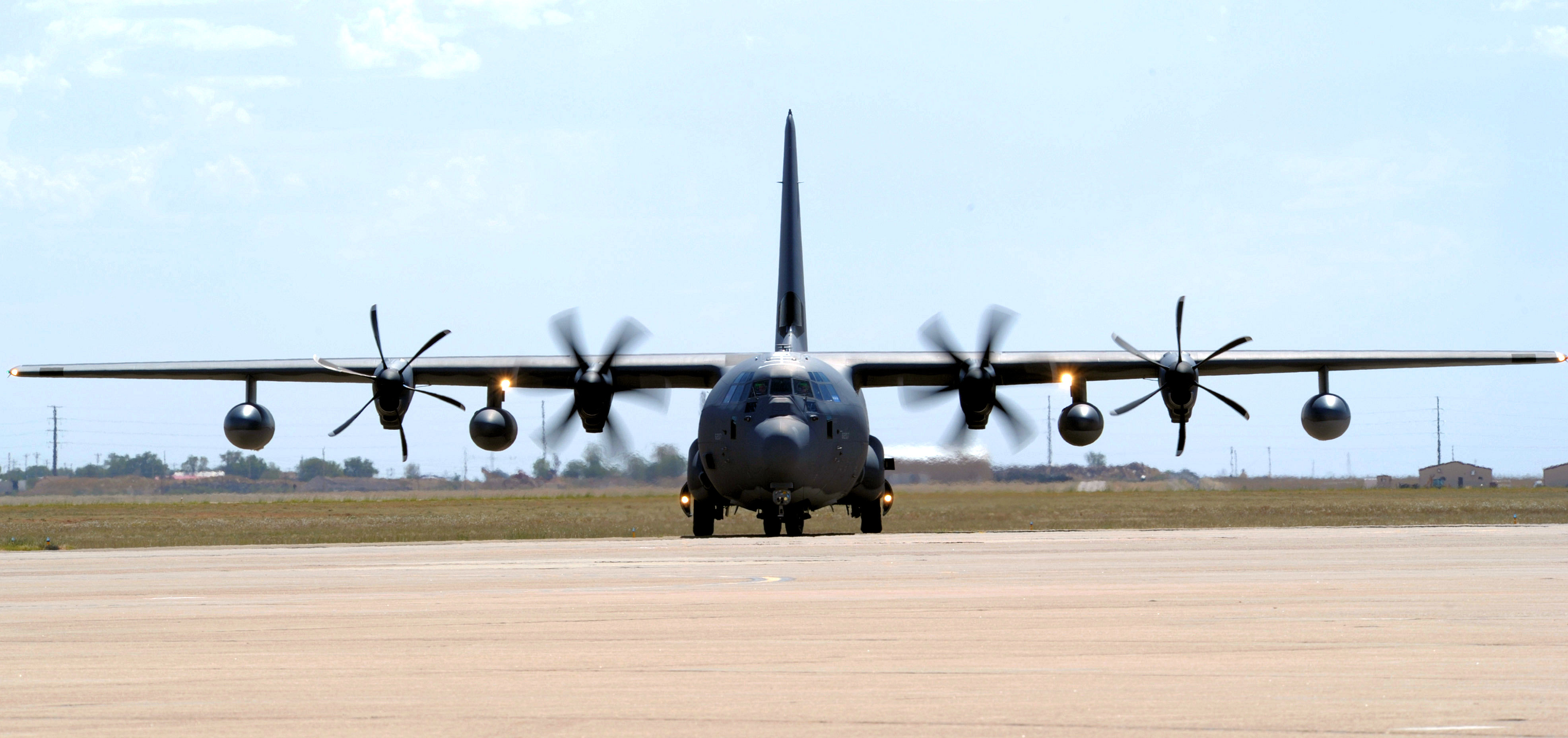
- A new MC-130J Commando II taxis on the flightline at Cannon Air Force Base, N.M., 29 September 2011
- Active: 1940–1945; 1946–2007; 2011–2014
- Country: United States
- Branch: United States Air Force
- Role: special operations
- Part of: Air Force Special Operations Command
- Garrison/HQ: Cannon AFB, New Mexico
- Nickname: Fireballs
- Motto: Air Commando (2011–2014)
- Engagements: Southwest Pacific Theater; Mediterranean Theater of Operations; Korean War; Vietnam War
- Decorations: Distinguished Unit Citation; Air Force Meritorious Unit Award; Air Force Outstanding Unit Award; Philippine Presidential Unit Citation; Republic of Korea Presidential Unit Citation; Republic of Vietnam Gallantry Cross with Palm

Insignia
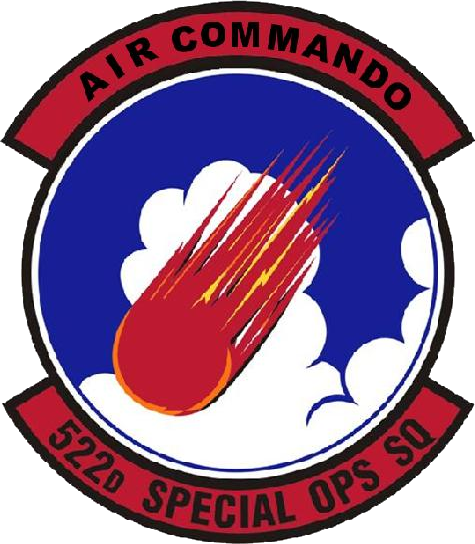
- 522nd Special Operations Squadron emblem (approved 25 June 1951)

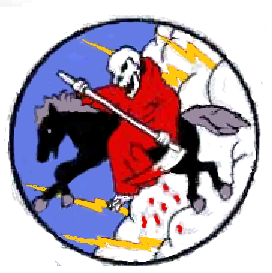
- 522nd Fighter-Bomber Squadron emblem (World War II)

The 522nd Special Operations Squadron, nicknamed the Fireballs, was a unit of the United States Air Force. It was part of the 27th Special Operations Group, the flying component of the 27th Special Operations Wing at Cannon Air Force Base. It was the first to operate the MC-130J Commando II.

The 522nd was originally organized in 1940 as the 16th Bombardment Squadron. When the United States entered World War II the squadron was deploying to the Philippines. Its ground echelon fought as infantry, with most members surrendering at Bataan, while the air echelon fought in the Netherlands East Indies, earning the squadron three Distinguished Unit Citation (DUC)s. In May 1942, the squadron reformed at Hunter Field, Georgia. It deployed to the Mediterranean Theater of Operations, where it was redesignated the 522nd Fighter-Bomber Squadron and was awarded an additional three DUCs. Following V-E Day, the squadron served in the occupation forces in Germany until the fall of 1945, when it returned to the United States and was inactivated.

The 522nd was reactivated in 1946 and assigned to Strategic Air Command (SAC) as a fighter escort unit. During the Korean War, the squadron deployed to Japan and Korea and was awarded its seventh DUC. In 1957, SAC transferred its fighter squadrons to Tactical Air Command and the squadron became the 522nd Tactical Fighter Squadron the following year. It conducted numerous deployments to bases in Europe and the Pacific, including one to Thailand, where it again saw combat during the Vietnam War. The squadron was inactivated in 2007, when its parent wing converted from the fighter to the special operations mission.

The squadron was reactivated in 2012 as a special operations unit, but was inactivated in 2014 and its mission, personnel and equipment were transferred to the 9th Special Operations Squadron.

== History ==
=== World War II ===
The 522nd was originally constituted in 1939 as the 16th Bombardment Squadron (Light) and activated on 1 February 1940. It was stationed at Barksdale Field, Louisiana, and later at Hunter Field, Georgia, before moving to Luzon in the Philippines in 1941. After war began between the United States and Japan, the unit's air echelon operated in Australia. When American units in the Philippines surrendered, ground elements of the unit were part of the Bataan Death March.

The unit was redesignated the 522nd Fighter-Bomber Squadron on 23 August 1943 and then the 522nd Fighter Squadron, Single Engine, on 30 May 1944. During World War II, it was one of the most decorated U.S. Army Air Force units. The unit later served in conflicts such as the Korean and Vietnam wars, and flew almost a dozen different aircraft in support of various missions.

=== Strategic Air Command ===
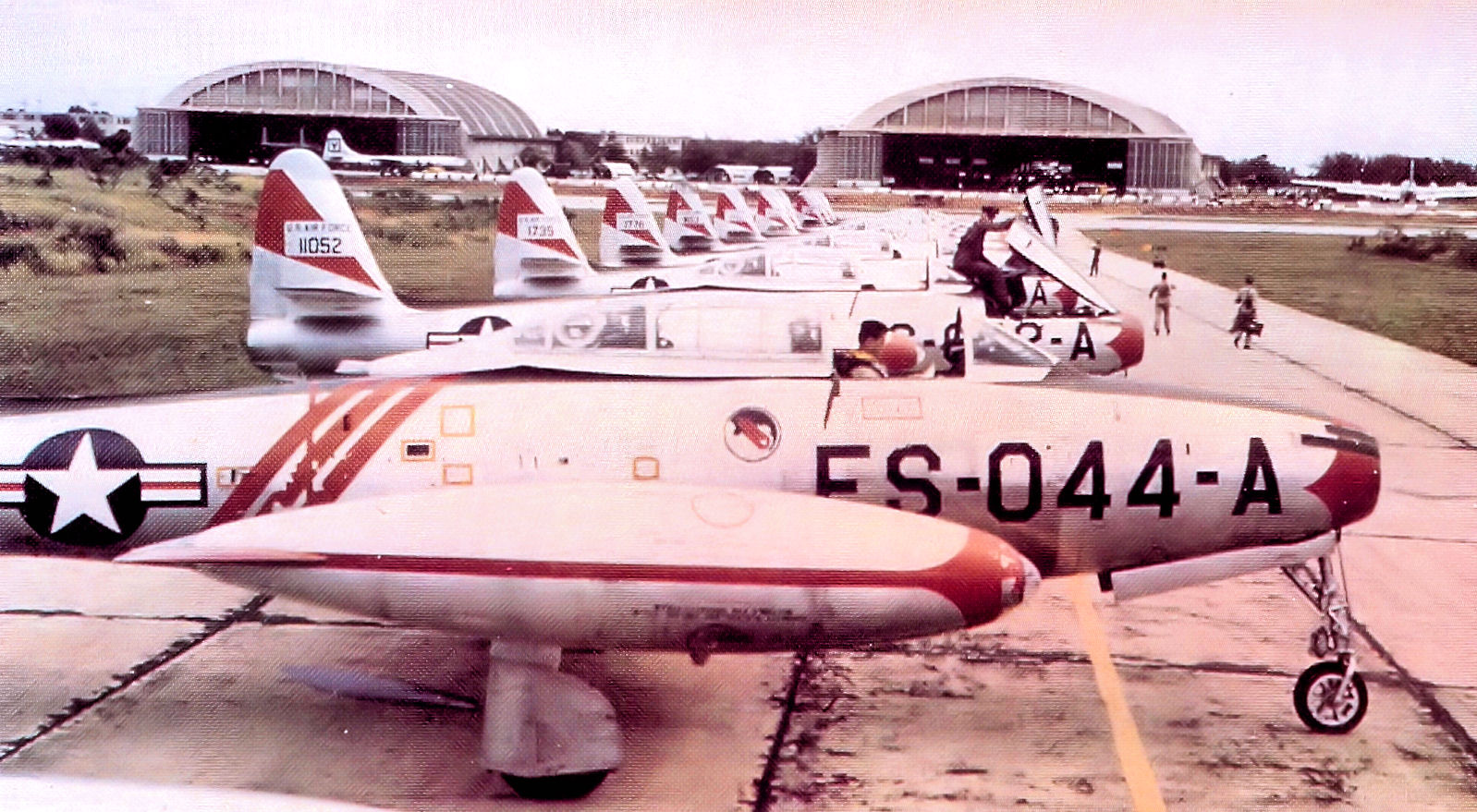
522nd Fighter-Escort Squadron F-84Gs, Bergstrom AFB, Texas, 1952

=== Tactical Air Command ===
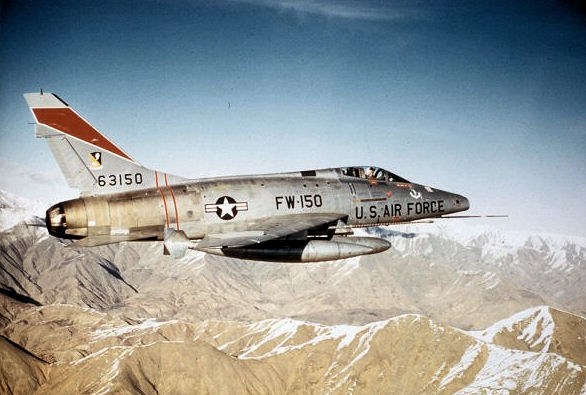
522nd TFS F-100D Super Sabre – 56-3150 about 1960

=== Air Combat Command ===
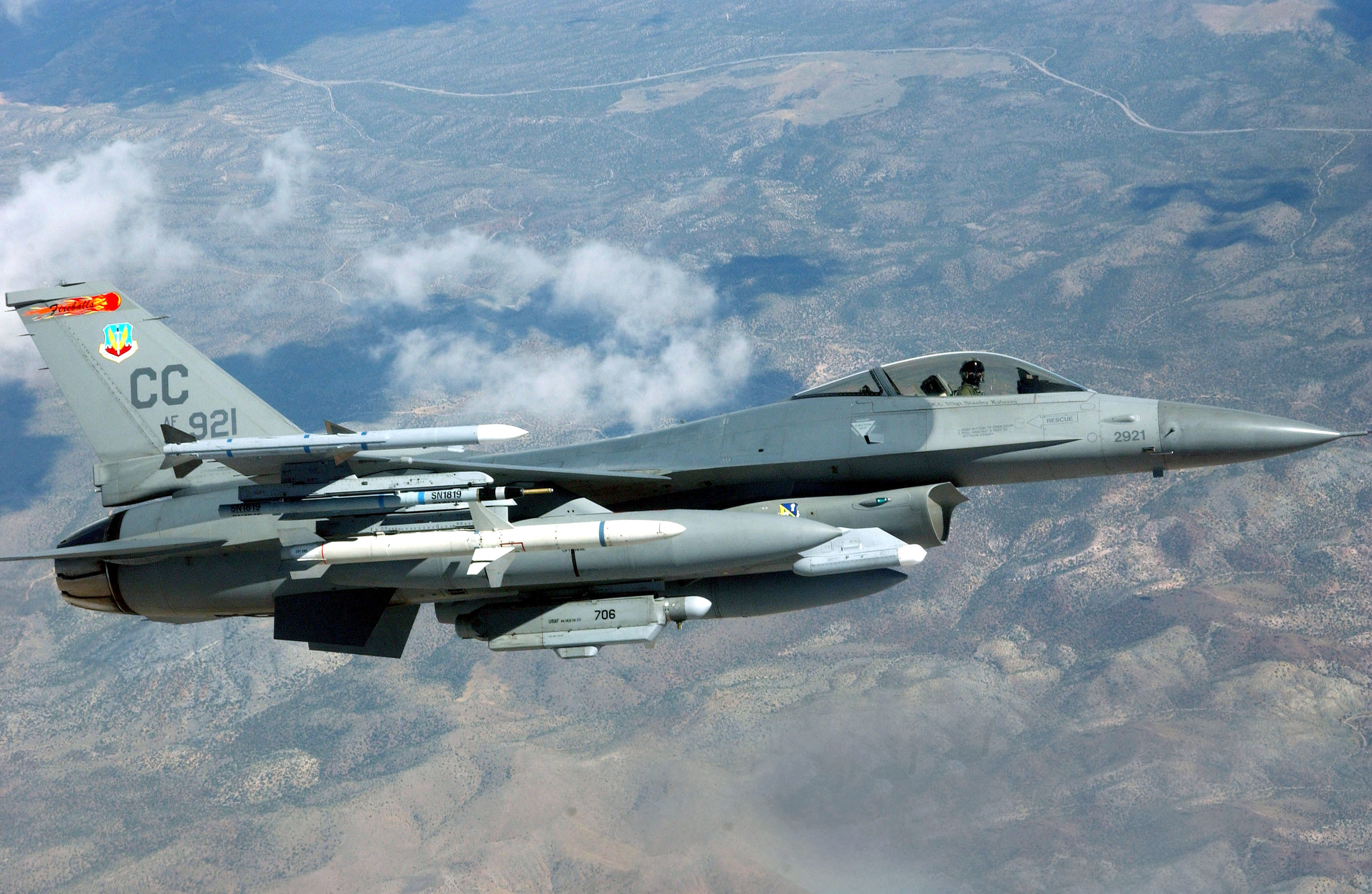
522nd F-16C Block 50P 92-3921

The 522nd Fighter Squadron inactivated in 2007 when the 27th Fighter Wing became the 27th Special Operations Wing.

=== Special operations ===
The 522nd Special Operations Squadron was reactivated at Cannon Air Force Base on 7 April 2011. The first to be equipped with the Lockheed MC-130J Commando II special operations aircraft, it was tasked with supporting special operations commanders through day and night low-level infiltration, exfiltration, resupply, and air refueling of helicopters. In 2012, it achieved initial operational capability.

The unit was inactivated and a ceremony marking this was held on 9 December 2014. The squadron's personnel, aircraft, and equipment were transferred to the 9th Special Operations Squadron, which moved to Cannon without personnel or equipment from Hurlburt Field.

== Lineage ==
- Constituted as the 16th Bombardment Squadron (Light) on 22 December 1939

Activated on 1 February 1940
Redesignated: 522nd Fighter-Bomber Squadron on 23 August 1943
Redesignated: 522nd Fighter Squadron, Single Engine on 30 May 1944
Inactivated on 7 November 1945

- Activated on 20 August 1946

Redesignated 522nd Fighter Squadron, Two Engine on 22 July 1947
Redesignated 522nd Fighter Squadron, Jet on 1 December 1949
Redesignated 522nd Fighter-Escort Squadron on 1 February 1950
Redesignated 522nd Strategic Fighter Squadron on 20 January 1953
Redesignated 522nd Fighter-Bomber Squadron on 1 July 1957
Redesignated 522nd Tactical Fighter Squadron on 1 July 1958
Redesignated 522nd Fighter Squadron on 1 November 1991
Inactivated on 30 September 2007

- Redesignated 522nd Special Operations Squadron on 1 March 2011
- Activated 7 April 2011
- Inactivated c. 9 December 2014

=== Assignments ===
- 27th Bombardment Group (later, 27th Fighter-Bomber Group, 27th Fighter Group), 1 February 1940 – 7 November 1945
- 27th Fighter Group (later 27 Fighter-Escort Group), 20 August 1946 (attached to 27th Fighter-Escort Wing after 6 August 1951)
- 27th Fighter-Escort Wing (later 27th Strategic Fighter Wing, 27th Fighter-Bomber Wing, 27th Tactical Fighter Wing, 27th Fighter Wing), 16 June 1952

Attached to unknown, 6 September–18 December 1958
Attached to TUSLOG, 18 October 1959 – 22 February 1960 and 5 February–15 June 1962
Attached to 405th Fighter Wing, 13 February–c. 7 March 1961, 8 August–c. 20 September 1964 and 15 August–25 November 1965
Attached to 2nd Air Division, 12 December 1962 – c. 15 February 1963, 16 March–6 May 1964 and c. 20 September–15 November 1964

- 27th Operations Group, 1 November 1991
- Twelfth Air Force, 1 October 2007 – 21 December 2007 (attached to 712th Operations Group (Provisional))
- 27th Special Operations Group, 7 April 2011 – c. 9 December 2014

=== Stations ===
- Barksdale Field, Louisiana, 1 February 1940
- Army Air Base, Savannah, Georgia, 7 October 1940 – 19 October 1941
- Fort William McKinley, Luzon, Philippines, 20 November 1941
- Lipa Airfield, Luzon, Philippines, 22 December 1941
- Cabcaben, Luzon, Philippines, (Ground echelon), 25 December 1941

Air echelon operated from Archerfield Airport, 24 December 1941 – 16 February 1942

- Bataan, Luzon, Philippines, (Ground echelon), 29 December 1941

Air echelon operated from Batchelor Airfield, Australia, 17 February-c. 8 March 1942
Air echelon operated from Archerfield Airport, Brisbane, Australia, c. 10-c. 25 March 1942

- Charters Towers Airfield, Australia, April-4 May 1942
- Hunter Field, Georgia, 4 May 1942
- Key Field, Mississippi, 14 July 1942
- Hattiesburg Army Air Field, Mississippi, 15 August 1942
- Harding Field, Louisiana, 25 October–21 November 1942
- Sainte-Barbe du Tlélat Airfield, Algeria, 26 December 1942
- Nouvion Airfield, Algeria, 5 January 1943
- Ras el Ma Airfield, French Morocco, 4 April 1943
- Korba Airfield, Tunisia, c. 8 June 1943
- Gela Airfield, Sicily, 18 July 1943
- Barcellona Landing Ground, Sicily, Italy, 3 September 1943
- Capaccio Airfield, Italy, 18 September 1943
- Paestum Airfield, Italy, 4 November 1943
- Pomigliano Airfield, Italy, 19 January 1944
- Castel Volturno Airfield, Italy, 10 April 1944
- Santa Maria Airfield, Italy, 9 May 1944
- Le Banca Airfield, Italy, 7 June 1944
- Ciampino Airfield, Italy, 12 June 1944
- Voltone Airfield, Italy, 4 July 1944
- Serragia Airfield, Corsica, France, 10 July 1944
- Le Luc Airfield, France, 25 August 1944
- Salon de Provence Airfield (Y-16), France, 30 August 1944
- Loyettes Airfield (Y-25), France, 11 September 1944
- Tarquinia Airfield, Italy, 2 October 1944
- Pontedera Airfield, Italy, 3 December 1944
- St-Dizier Airfield (A-64), France, 21 February 1945
- Toul/Ochey Airfield (A-96), France, 19 March 1945
- Biblis Airfield (Y-78), Germany, 5 April 1945
- AAF Station Mannheim/Sandhofen (Y-79), Germany, 23 June 1945
- AAF Station Stuttgart/Echterdingen (R-50), Germany, 15 September–20 October 1945
- Camp Shanks, New York, 6–7 November 1945
- AAF Station Fritzlar, Germany, 20 August 1946
- AAF Station Bad Kissingen, Germany, 25 June 1947
- Andrews Field, Maryland, 25 June 1947
- Kearney Army Air Field (later, Kearney Air Force Base), Nebraska, 16 July 1947
- Bergstrom Air Force Base, Texas, 16 March 1949

Deployed to Taegu Air Base (K-9), South Korea, 5 December 1950 – 30 January 1951
Deployed to Itazuke Air Base, Japan, 31 January–20 June 1951
Deployed to Misawa Air Base, Japan, 13–16 October 1952
Deployed to Chitose Air Base, Japan, 17 October 1952 – c. 13 February 1953
Deployed to RAF Sturgate, England, 7 May–17 August 1955
Deployed to Kadena Air Base, Okinawa, 6 September–18 December 1958

- Cannon Air Force Base, New Mexico, 18 February 1959 – 30 September 2007

Deployed to Incirlik Air Base, Turkey, 18 October 1959 – 22 February 1960
Deployed to Clark Air Base, Philippines, 13 February–c. 7 March 1961
Deployed to England Air Force Base, Louisiana, 29 March–5 May 1961
Deployed to Incirlik Air Base, Turkey, 5 February–15 June 1962
Deployed to MacDill Air Force Base, Florida, 21 October–1 December 1962
Deployed to Da Nang Air Base, South Vietnam, 16 Mar-6 May 1964 (B Flight)
Deployed to Clark Air Base, Philippines, 8 Aug-25 Nov 1964 (further deployed to Bien Hoa Air Base, South Vietnam, after 15 August 1964)
Deployed to Holloman Air Force Base, New Mexico, 13 April–12 May 1966

- Cannon AFB, New Mexico, 1 October 2007 – 21 December 2007
- Cannon AFB, New Mexico, 7 April 2011 – c. 9 December 2014

=== Aircraft ===
- Trained with B-18 Bolos and A-18 Shrikes, 1940–1941
- A-24 Banshee, 1941–1942
- A-20 Havoc, 1941, 1942–1943
- A-36 Apache, 1943–1944
- P-40 Warhawk, 1944
- P-47 Thunderbolt, 1944–1945; 1946–1947
- P-51 Mustang, 1947–1948
- F-82 Twin Mustang, 1948–1950
- F-84 Thunderjet, 1950–1951, 1951–1957
- F-101 Voodoo, 1957–1958, 1958
- F-100 Super Sabre, 1959–1969
- F-111D Aardvark, 1969–1970, 1970–1971, 1971–1998
- F-16 Falcon, 1996–2007
- MC-130J Commando II, 2011 – present
