= 523d Fighter Squadron =

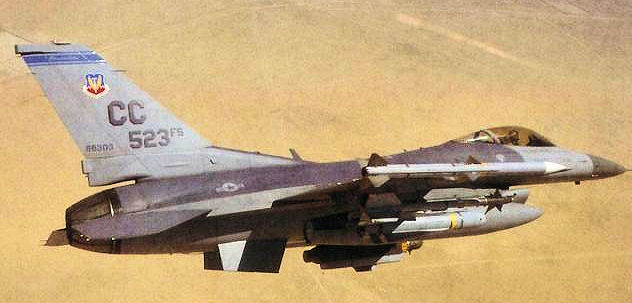
- 523d Fighter Squadron F-16C Fighting Falcon (Note: Aircraft is General Dynamics F-16C Block 30D Fighting Falcon, serial 86–303)
- Active: 1940–1945; 1946–2007
- Country: United States
- Branch: United States Air Force
- Role: Fighter
- Engagements: Southwest Pacific Theater; Mediterranean Theater of Operations; Korean War; Vietnam War
- Decorations: Distinguished Unit Citation; Air Force Outstanding Unit Award; Philippine Presidential Unit Citation; Republic of Korea Presidential Unit Citation

Insignia
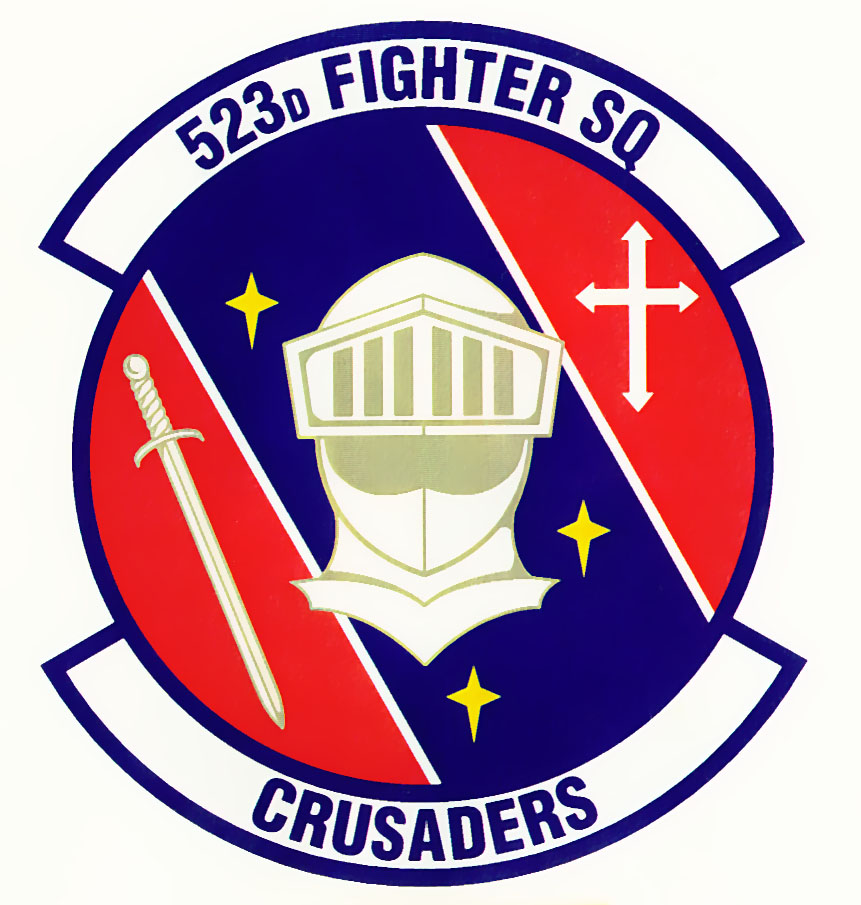
- 523d Fighter Squadron emblem (approved 5 February 1974)

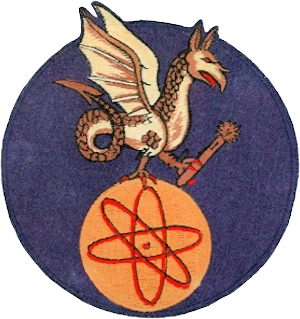
- 523d Fighter-Escort Squadron emblem (approved 5 January 1951)

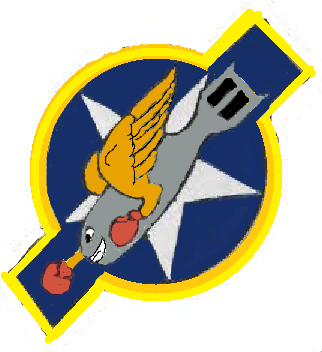
- 523d Fighter-Bomber Squadron emblem (World War II)

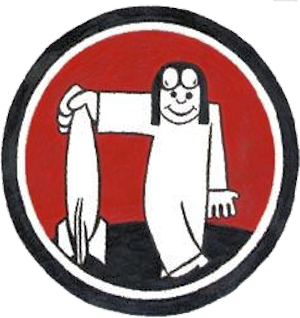
- 17th Bombardment Squadron emblem (approved 4 November 1941)

The 523d Fighter Squadron is an inactive United States Air Force unit. Its last assignment was with the 27th Operations Group stationed at Cannon Air Force Base, New Mexico.

During World War II, its predecessor unit, the 17th Bombardment Squadron (Light) fought in the Philippines campaign (1941–1942). Its ground personnel fought as infantry in the Battle of Bataan with the survivors being forced to march as prisoners in the Bataan Death March. The squadron reformed with its present numerical designation, and by the end of World War II, the Airmen of the 523d were among the most decorated USAAF units of the war, having fought in the North African, Sicilian, Italian and Southern France campaigns in the European Theater.

Until its inactivation in 2007, the 523d had been engaged in every major combat action the United States had engaged in since its activation in 1940 (World War II, both Pacific and European Theaters; Korean War; Vietnam War; Operation Desert Storm; Global War on Terrorism).

== Operations ==
The 523d Fighter Squadron was known as the "Crusaders". Its primary mission was to maintain a continuous ability to rapidly deploy and support American combatant commanders worldwide with day or night General Dynamics F-16 Fighting Falcon combat operations. They were committed to employing the F-16C throughout the entire spectrum of offensive and defensive missions, including air interdiction, close air support, forward air control, strategic attack and counter-air, through employing a wide variety of conventional, precision-guided and nuclear weapons.

It was inactivated in 2007 when Cannon Air Force Base and its host 27th Special Operations Wing realigned from an Air Combat Command fighter base to an Air Force Special Operations Command base with a new mission.

== History ==
=== World War II ===
Formed as a Douglas B-18 Bolo bombardment squadron under Third Air Force in Louisiana during 1940. Re-equipped with Douglas A-24 Dauntless dive bombers, then in late 1941, ordered to Philippine Air Force in response to the growing crisis in the Pacific. Ground echelon arrived in Philippines in late November 1941, however outbreak of World War II in the Pacific caused A-24 aircraft to be diverted to Australia. Portions of air echelon flew to Australia to pick up aircraft, however Japanese advance in the Philippines prevented their return. Personnel in the Philippines reassigned as ground infantry unit and engaged the enemy on Luzon during the ground Battle of Bataan. Some personnel were evacuated to Australia by submarine. After collapse of large-scale United States forces in May 1942, the survivors endured the Bataan Death March or continued as unorganized resistance forces in the Japan-occupied Philippines.

Air echelon reorganized in Australian Northern Territory and fought in Dutch East Indies and New Guinea Campaigns until equipment depleted. Moved without personnel or equipment to Hunter Field, Georgia. Re-equipped first with Douglas A-20 Havocs then North American A-36 Apache Apache fighter-bombers in the United States, then deployed to North Africa, assigned to Twelfth Air Force. Redesignated 523d Fighter-Bomber Squadron in August 1943 after Sicilian Campaign. Re-equipped with Curtiss P-40 Warhawks, then Republic P-47 Thunderbolts and engaged enemy forces as a tactical fighter squadron during the Italian Campaign. Supported ground forces in Operation Dragoon, the invasion of Southern France and drive northwards though Lyon until linking with Allied ground forces in eastern France. Returned to Italy and engaged enemy forces in the Po Valley, then returning to France in the spring of 1945 and supporting ground forces during the Western Allied invasion of Germany in March/April 1945. Squadron demobilized in Germany summer 1945, being inactivated as a paper unit in November 1945.

=== Cold War ===
Reactivated as part of United States Air Forces in Europe occupation forces in Germany, 1946. Moved to Kearney Army Air Field, Nebraska in 1947 as a strategic escort squadron for Boeing B-29 Superfortress and Boeing B-50 Superfortresses. Equipped with very long-range North American F-82 Twin Mustangs in 1948, being replaced with Republic F-84E Thunderjets in 1950.

Deployed to Far East Air Forces, December 1950 and engaged in combat over Korea as escort squadron for B-29 Bombers of Far East Air Force. Remained in combat until armistice in 1953. Escorted Strategic Air Command Convair B-36 Peacemaker strategic bombers throughout the 1950s until SAC inactivated fighter-escort squadrons in 1957 with final phaseout of propeller-driven strategic bomber force.

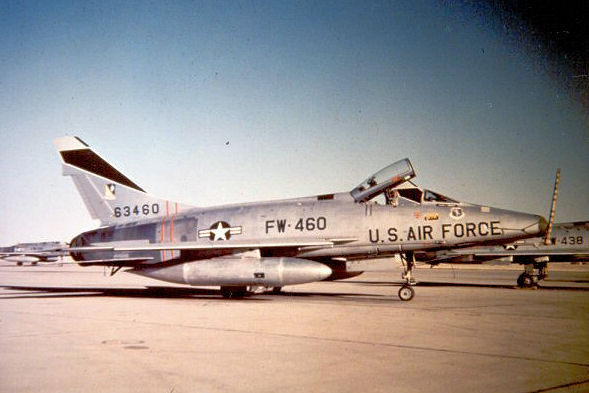
523d F-100 Super Sabre (Note: Aircraft is North American F-100D Super Sabre, serial 56-3460, taken about 1960.)

Reassigned to Tactical Air Command and re-equipped with McDonnell F-101B Voodoo, then North American F-100 Super Sabre tactical fighter aircraft. Moved to Cannon Air Force Base, New Mexico, however performed rotational deployments to Sixteenth Air Force in southern Europe, deploying to Turkey, France, Saudi Arabia and other stations as part of United States Air Forces in theater. In 1964, began rotational deployments to Japan and South Korea as part of air defense forces.

Reassigned to Pacific Air Forces in 1965 at Clark Air Base, Philippines. Became rotational deployment squadron to Taiwan in 1966 with F-100 aircraft; later provided forces to Thirteenth Air Force in Thailand, 1972 as a McDonnell F-4E Phantom II squadron during defense of South Vietnam as a result of North Vietnamese Easter Offensive (Operation Linebacker). After end of United States involvement in Indochina War, 1973, returned to Cannon as a tactical fighter squadron.

The 523d Fighter Squadron also deployed an McDonnell F-4 Phantom II detachment in Tainan Air Base, Taiwan. Until August 1973, its main task was to assist Taiwan's air defense missions to resist air threats from China.

== Lineage ==
- Constituted as the 17th Bombardment Squadron (Light) on 22 December 1939

Activated on 1 February 1940
Redesignated 523d Fighter-Bomber Squadron on 23 August 1943
Redesignated 523d Fighter Squadron, Single Engine on 30 May 1944
Inactivated on 7 November 1945

- Activated on 20 August 1946

Redesignated: 523d Fighter Squadron, Two Engine on 22 July 1947
Redesignated 523d Fighter Squadron, Jet on 1 December 1949
Redesignated 523d Fighter-Escort Squadron on 1 February 1950
Redesignated 523d Strategic Fighter Squadron on 20 January 1953
Redesignated 523d Fighter-Bomber Squadron on 1 July 1957
Redesignated 523d Tactical Fighter Squadron on 1 July 1958
Redesignated 523d Fighter Squadron on 1 November 1991
Inactivated on 30 September 2007

=== Assignments ===
- 27th Bombardment Group (later 27th Fighter-Bomber Group, 27th Fighter Group), 1 February 1940 – 7 November 1945

Ground echelon attached to V Interceptor Command, 24 December 1941 – 8 May 1942; further assigned to: 2nd Battalion (27th Bombardment Group) Provisional Infantry Regiment (Air Corps)

- 27th Fighter Group (later 27th Fighter-Escort Group), 20 August 1946 (attached to 27th Fighter-Escort Wing after 6 August 1951)
- 27th Fighter-Escort Wing (later 27th Strategic Fighter Wing, 27th Fighter-Bomber Wing, 27th Tactical Fighter Wing), 16 June 1952

Attached to The U.S. Logistics Group (TUSLOG), 11 February – 20 June 1960 and 12 October 1962 – c. 12 January 1963
Attached to United States Air Forces in Europe, 1 September – 20 November 1961
Attached to 4135th Strategic Wing, 12 April – 6 June 1962
Attached to 39th Air Division, 9 June – 6 September 1964 and 22 March – 30 June 1965

- 405th Fighter Wing, 20 November 1965

Attached to 432d Tactical Reconnaissance Wing, 9 April – 24 October 1972

- 27th Tactical Fighter Wing (later 27th Fighter Wing), 31 August 1973
- 27th Operations Group, 1 November 1991 – 30 September 2007

=== Stations ===
- Barksdale Field, Louisiana, 1 February 1940
- Hunter Field, Georgia, 7 October 1940 – 19 October 1941
- Fort William McKinley, Luzon, Philippines, 20 November 1941
- San Fernando, Luzon, Philippines, 22 December 1941
- Cabcaben, Luzon, Philippines, 24 December 1941

Air echelon operated from Brisbane, Australia, 24 December 1941 – c. 20 February 1942

- Limay, Luzon, Philippines, 28 December 1941
- Bataan, Luzon, Philippines, 5 January 1942

Air echelon operated from Batchelor Field, Australia, 22 February-c. 8 March 1942
Air echelon operated from Brisbane, Australia, 10-c. 25 March 1942

- Charters Towers Airport, Australia, April-4 May 1942
- Hunter Field, Georgia, 4 May 1942
- Key Field, Mississippi, 14 July 1942
- Hattiesburg Army Air Field, Mississippi, 11 August 1942
- Harding Field, Louisiana, 23 October – 17 November 1942
- Sainte-Barbe du Tlélat Airfield, Algeria, 26 December 1942
- Nouvion Airfield, Algeria, 9 January 1943
- Ras el Ma Airfield, French Morocco, 1 April 1943
- Korba Airfield, Tunisia, 4 June 1943
- Gela Airfield, Sicily, Italy, 18 July 1943
- Barcelona Landing Ground, Sicily, Italy, 5 September 1943
- Capaccio Airfield, Italy, 18 September 1943
- Guado Airfield, Italy, 5 November 1943
- Pomigliano Airfield, Italy, 19 January 1944
- Castel Volturno Airfield, Italy, 10 April 1944
- Santa Maria Airfield, Italy, 9 May 1944
- Le Banca Airfield, Italy, 6 June 1944
- Ciampino Airport, Italy, 12 June 1944
- Voltone Airfield, Italy, 4 July 1944
- Serragia Airfield, Corsica, France, 10 July 1944
- Le Luc Airfield, France, 25 August 1944
- Salon de Provence Airfield (ALG Y-16), France, 30 August 1944
- Loyettes Airfield (ALG Y-25), France, 12 September 1944
- Tarquinia Airfield, Italy, 2 October 1944
- Pontedera Airfield, Italy, 3 December 1944
- Saint-Dizier Airfield (A-64), France, 21 February 1945
- Toul-Ochey Airfield (A-96), France, 19 March 1945
- Biblis Airfield (Y-78), Germany, 6 April 1945
- AAF Station Mannheim/Sandhofen (Y-79), Germany, 24 June 1945
- AAF Station Echterdingen (R-50), Germany, 15 September – 20 October 1945
- Camp Shanks, New York, 6–7 November 1945
- AAF Station Fritzlar, Germany, 20 August 1946
- AAF Station Bad Kissingen, Germany, 25 June 1947
- Andrews Field, Maryland, 25 June 1947
- Kearney Army Air Field (later Kearney Air Force Base), Nebraska, 16 July 1947

Deployed to McChord Air Force Base, Washington, 28 March-26 April and 28 April–18 May 1948

- Bergstrom Air Force Base, Texas, 16 March 1949

Deployed to Taegu Air Base (K-2), South Korea, 5 December 1950 – 30 January 1951
Deployed to Itazuke Air Base, Japan, 31 January–3 July 1951
Deployed to Misawa Air Base, Japan, 13 October 1952 – c. 13 February 1953
Deployed to RAF Sturgate, England, 7 May–17 August 1955

- Cannon Air Force Base, New Mexico, 18 February 1959 – November 1965

Deployed to Incirlik Air Base, Turkey, c. 24 February–17 June 1960
Deployed to England Air Force Base, Louisiana, 29 March–21 April 1961
Deployed to Chambley-Bussières Air Base, France, c. 5 September – 20 November 1961
Deployed to Incirlik Air Base, Turkey, c. 12 October 1962 – c. 15 January 1963
Deployed to Misawa Air Base, Japan, 12 June – 4 September 1964, 22 March–2 May 1965 and 11–30 June 1965 (with detachment at Kunsan Air Base, South Korea, c. 22 March – 2 May 1965 and 11–22 June 1965)

- Clark Air Base, Philippines, 23 November 1965 – 31 August 1973 (with Detachment to Tainan Air Base, Taiwan, 23 November 1965 – 31 August 1973)

Deployed to Udorn Royal Thai Air Force Base, Thailand, 9 April–24 October 1972

- Cannon Air Force Base, New Mexico, 31 August 1973 – 30 September 2007

Deployed to Incirlik Air Base, Turkey, September 1992 – July 1993 (Operation Provide Comfort)
Deployed to Prince Sultan Air Base, Saudi Arabia, March 1988 – March 1999 (Operation Southern Watch)
Deployed to NAS Keflavik, Iceland, August–September 1999
Deployed to Aviano Air Base, Italy, March–June 1999 (Operation Allied Force)
Deployed to Undisclosed locations in Southwest Asia as part of 27th Expeditionary Operations Group, 2002–2007
Deployed to Misawa Air Base, Japan, January 2005 – June 2005 (Operation Southern Watch)

=== Aircraft ===
- Douglas B-18 Bolo, 1940–1941
- Douglas A-24 Dauntless, 1941–1942
- Douglas A-20 Havoc, 1941, 1942–1943
- North American A-36 Apache, 1943–1944
- Curtiss P-40 Warhawk, 1944
- Republic P-47 Thunderbolt, 1944–1945; 1946–1947
- North American P-51 Mustang (later F-51), 1947–1948
- North American F-82 Twin Mustang, 1948–1950
- Republic F-84 Thunderjet, 1950–1957
- McDonnell F-101 Voodoo, 1957–1958
- North American F-100 Super Sabre, 1959–1968
- McDonnell F-4 Phantom II, 1967–1973
- General Dynamics F-111 Aardvark, 1973–1995
- General Dynamics F-16 Fighting Falcon, 1995–2007
