= Loyettes Airfield =

Abandoned USAAF airfield in France

Loyettes Airfield Advanced Landing Ground (ALG) Y-25
- Part of Twelfth Air Force
- Rhône-Alpes Region, France

Site information
- Type: Military airfield
- Controlled by: United States Army Air Forces

Location
- Coordinates: 45°47′16.04″N 005°12′49.89″E

Site history
- Built: 1944
- In use: 1944
- Battles/wars: Southern France Campaign

Loyettes Airfield is an abandoned World War II United States Army Air Forces military airfield in France, which was located approximately 1 km north of Loyettes (Département de l'Ain, Rhone-Alpes), 28 km east of Lyon. It was located at a prewar grass airdrome, which was improved by the XII Engineer Command for military aircraft use. It was known as Advanced Landing Ground Y-25.

Y-25 consisted of the sod runway, 6000' in length and 150' wide, aligned 02/20. The airfield was equipped with an access road was built to the existing road infrastructure; a dump for supplies, ammunition, and gasoline drums, along with a drinkable water and minimal electrical grid for communications and station lighting. Tents were used for billeting and also for support facilities.

The XII Fighter Command 27th Fighter Group used the airfield between 11 September and early October 1944, flying A-36 Apache ground attack aircraft in support of ground forces advancing into Eastern France. The 57th Air Service Squadron provided ground echelon support.

The Americans left the airdrome on 20 November, returning it to local authorities. Today, the area where Loyettes Airfield existed is an agricultural area.

== See also ==
- Advanced Landing Ground
