= 27th Special Operations Group =

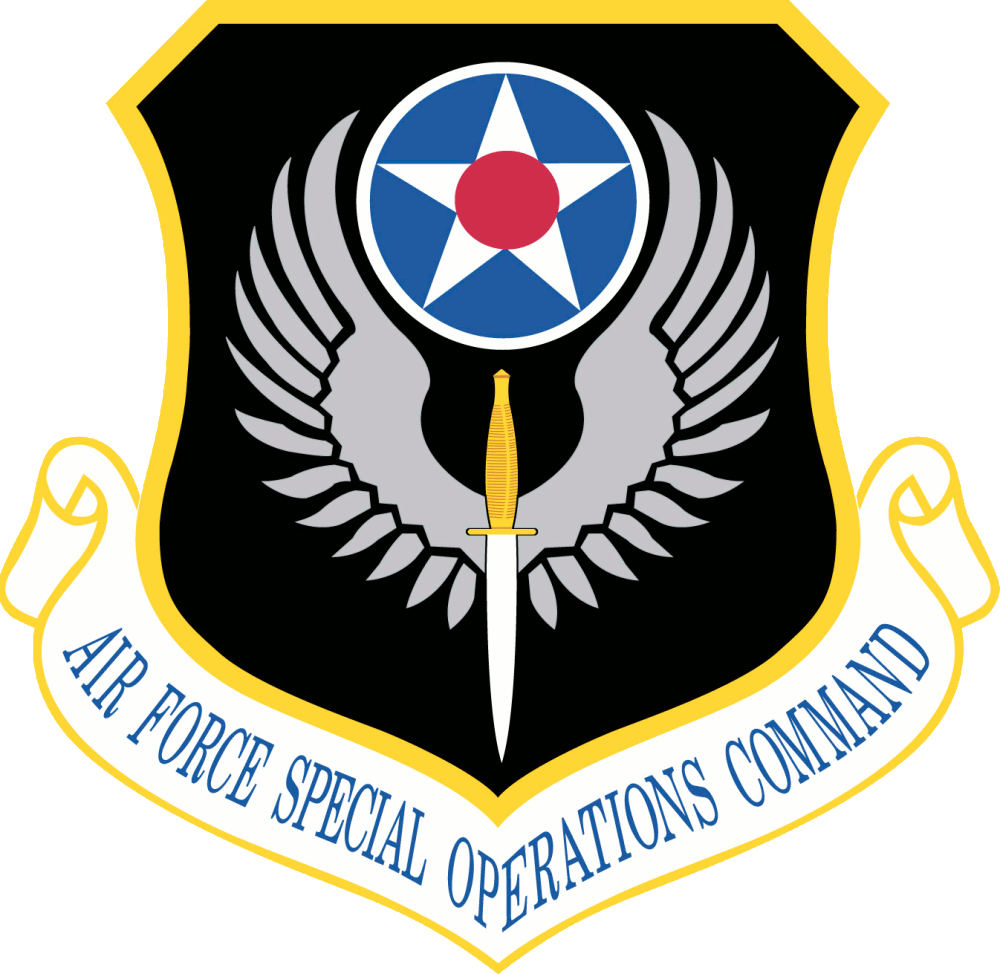
27th Special Operations Group

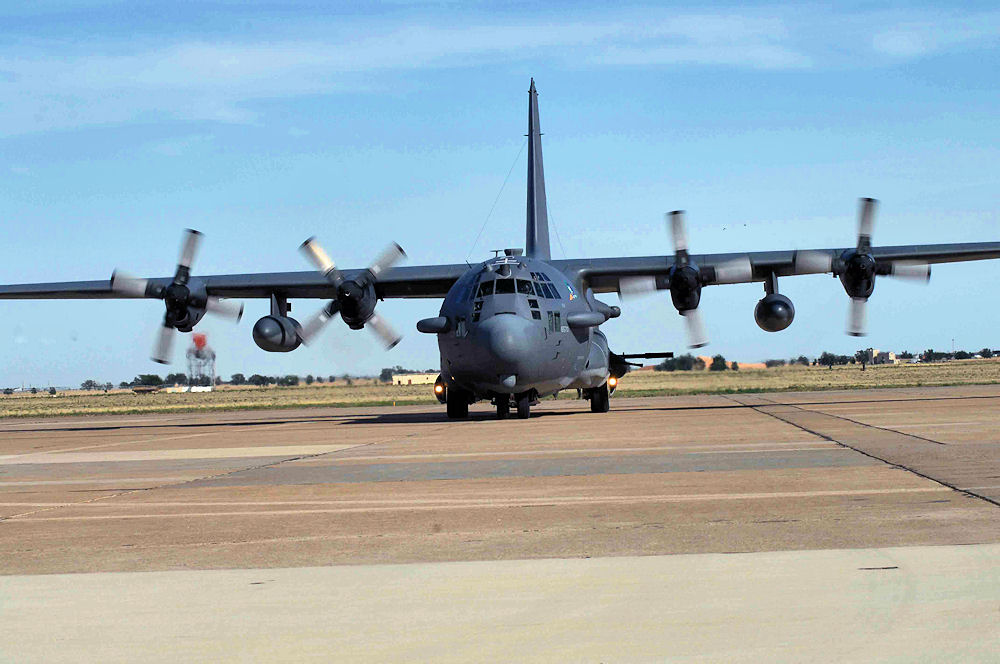
- A 16th Special Operations Squadron AC-130H Spectre gunship on the flightline at Cannon AFB
- Active: 1940–1945; 1946–1952; 1991–present
- Country: United States
- Branch: United States Air Force
- Part of: Air Force Special Operations Command
- Garrison/HQ: Cannon Air Force Base
- Motto: Intelligent Strength
- Engagements: Southwest Pacific Theater; Mediterranean Theater of Operations; European Theater of Operations; Korean War
- Decorations: Distinguished Unit Citation; Air Force Meritorious Unit Award; Air Force Outstanding Unit Award; Philippine Republic Presidential Unit Citation; Republic of Korea Presidential Unit Citation

Insignia
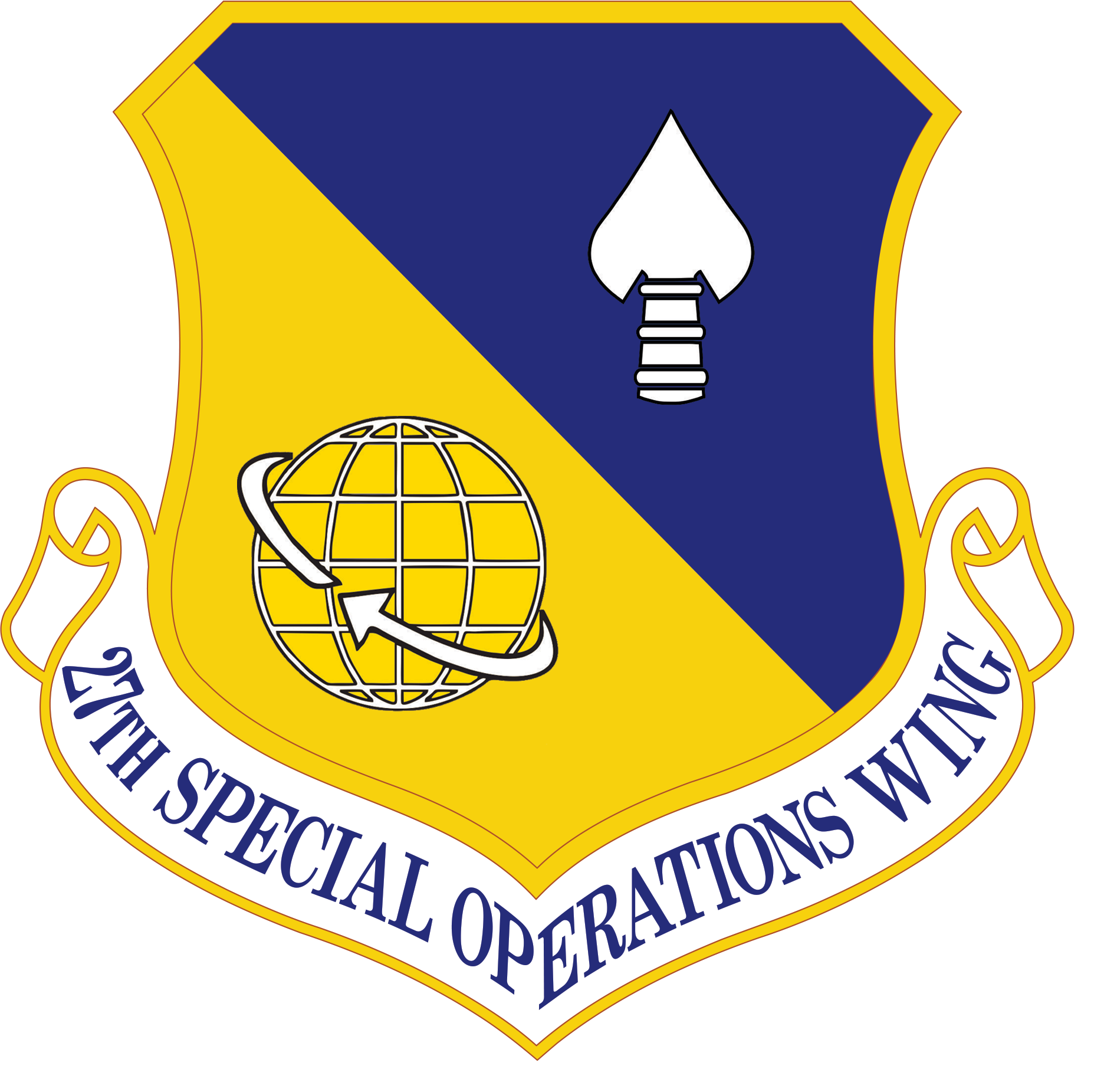
- 27th Special Operations Group emblem (Note: While assigned to the 27th Wing, the group uses the wing emblem with the group designation on the scroll. AF Instruction 84-105, Organizational Lineage, Honors and History, 27 April 2017, paragraph 3.3.3.)

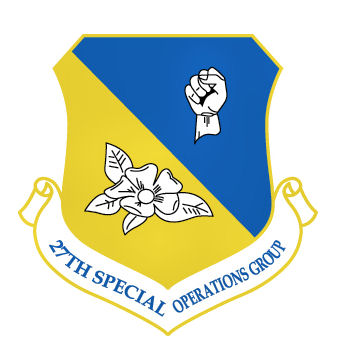
- 27th Fighter-Escort Group emblem (Note: Earlier wing emblem used by the group. This was the earlier group emblem placed on an Air Force shield.)

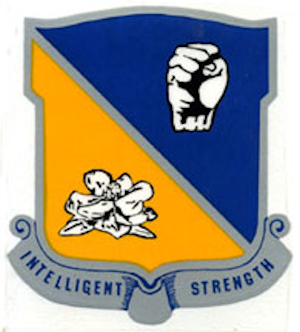
- 27th Bombardment Group emblem (Note: Approved 12 September 1940. Description: Per bend azure and or, in sinister chief a right hand clenched fist couped at the wrist, in dexter base a magnolia blossom leaved all argent, fimbriated sable.)

The 27th Special Operations Group is the flying component of the 27th Special Operations Wing, assigned to the Air Force Special Operations Command. The group is stationed at Cannon Air Force Base, New Mexico.

During the Second World War, its predecessor unit, the 27th Bombardment Group fought in the Southwest Pacific Theater and Mediterranean, Middle East and African theatres. Its ground personnel fought as infantry in the 1941–1942 Battle of Bataan with the survivors being forced to march as prisoners in the Bataan Death March. Later, its air echelon was awarded five Distinguished Unit Citations and a Philippine Presidential Unit Citation. The airmen of the 27th were among the most decorated USAAF units of the war.

== Mission ==
The group carries out global special operations tasks as an Air Force component of the United States Special Operations Command. It conducts infiltration/exfiltration, combat support, helicopter and tilt-rotor aerial refueling, psychological warfare, and other special missions. It directs the deployment, employment, training, and planning for squadrons that operate the AC-130W, MC-130J, CV-22B, U-28A and MQ-9, and provides operational support to flying operations.

The group conducts infiltration/exfiltration, combat support, tilt-rotor operations, helicopter aerial refueling, close air support, unmanned aerial vehicle operations, non-standard aviation, and other special missions. It directs the deployment, employment, training, and planning for squadrons that operate the AC-130W, MC-130J, CV-22B, C-146A, U-28A, MQ-1, MQ-9 and provides operational support to flying operations.

== History ==
On 1 February 1940, the United States Army Air Corps activated the 27th Bombardment Group (Light) at Barksdale Field, Louisiana and equipped it with the Douglas B-18 Bolo medium bomber aircraft. The group consisted of the 15th, 16th and 17th Bombardment Squadrons. In October 1941 the group moved to Hunter Field, Georgia, less the 15th Bombardment Squadron, which was reassigned to V Air Support Command on 14 October. On 21 October 1941 the group was ordered to the Philippine Islands in response to the growing crisis in the Pacific.

=== World War II ===
==== Philippine Campaign 1941–1942 ====
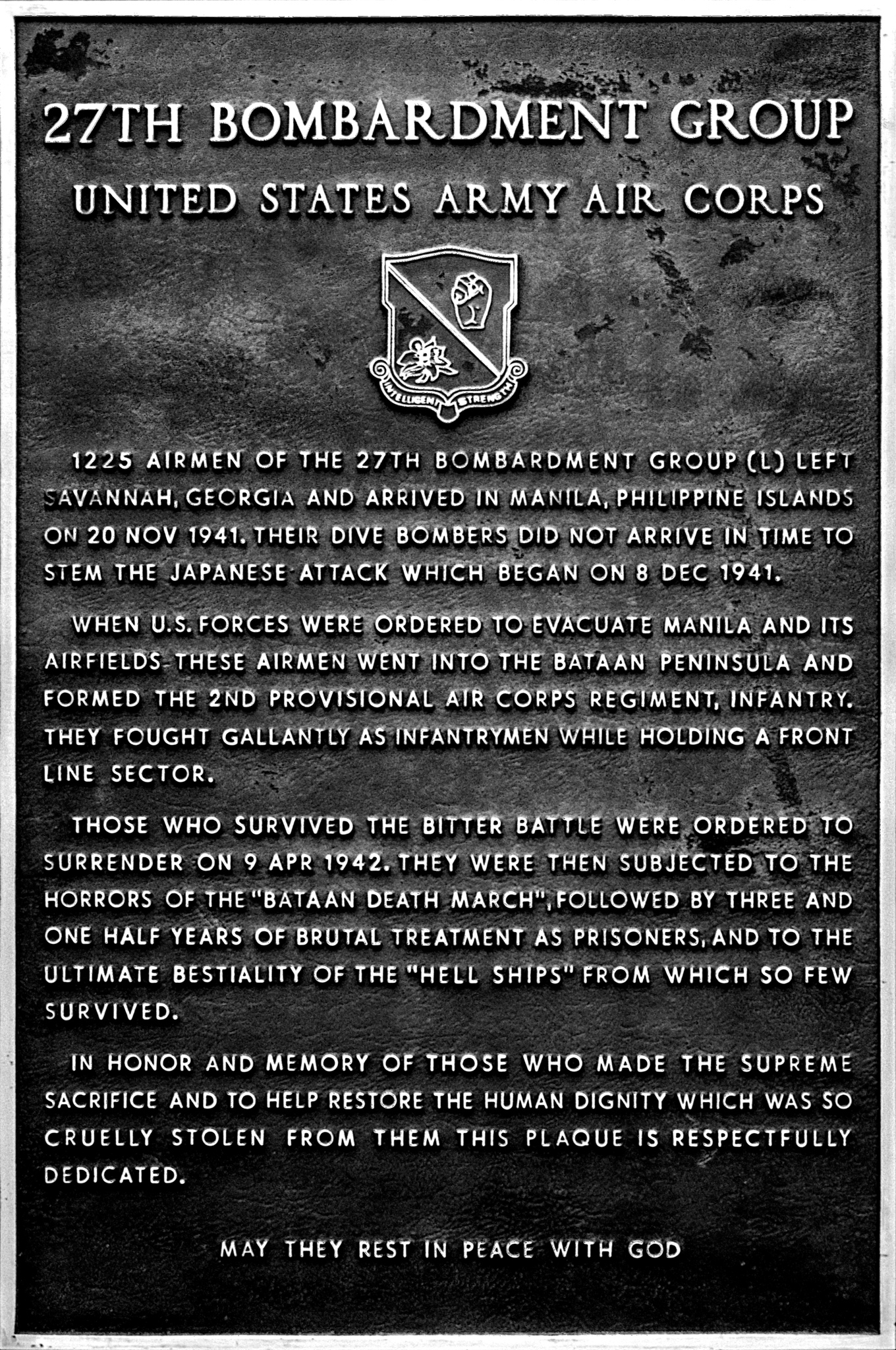
Memorial Plaque at Andersonville NHS

Arriving at Fort William McKinley in the Philippines on 20 November, the group readied itself for delivery of its Douglas A-24 Banshee aircraft. Concern grew as days turned into weeks and still the planes had not arrived. When the Imperial Japanese Army attacked the Philippines on 9 December 1941, the situation had not changed. Unknown to the group's airmen, to avoid capture or destruction, the ship carrying the planes was diverted to Australia when the war escalated.

On 18 December Major John H. Davies, group commander, and an aircrew of 20 flew from Clark Field on Luzon in two B-18s and one Douglas C-39 of Transport Command to Tarakan Island in the Dutch East Indies to Darwin Australia arriving on 22 December. Flying from Darwin, the group arrived in Brisbane on 24 December to pick up their A-24s off the ship USAT Meigs. However, as a swift Japanese advance prevented his group from returning to the Philippines, the air echelon of the 27th was ordered to operate from Brisbane.

The ground echelon of the 27th still in the Philippines was evacuated south from Luzon on 25 December to the Bataan Peninsula, arriving to form the 2nd Battalion (27th Bombardment Group) Provisional Infantry Regiment (Air Corps). For the 99 days following the attack on Pearl Harbor until their surrender to the Japanese after the Battle of Bataan, the men of the 27th became the only Air Force unit in history to fight as an infantry regiment, and were the only unit to be taken captive in whole. After surrendering, they were forced to endure the infamous Bataan Death March. Of the 880 or so Airmen who were taken, fewer than half survived captivity.

However, a number of officers and enlisted men of the 27th Bomb Group were evacuated out of the Philippines in five U.S. Navy submarines just before it was overrun by the Japanese during April. USS Seawolf, USS Seadragon, USS Sargo, USS Swordfish and USS Spearfish, on the night of 3 May 1942 managed to sneak into Manila Bay and evacuate American personnel from Corregidor to Java and Fremantle, Western Australia.

==== Dutch East Indies and New Guinea Campaigns 1942 ====
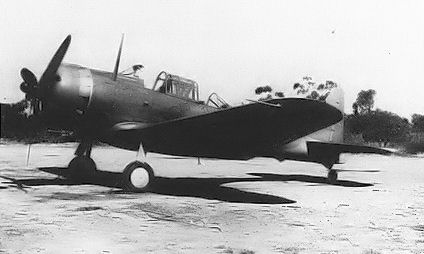
27th Bombardment Group A-24 Banshee dive bomber (Note: Aircraft is Douglas A-24-DE Banshee.Photo taken after aircraft was transferred to the 8th Bombardment Squadron at Charters Towers Airfield, Queensland, Australia, 1942.)

In Australia, the escaped airmen and aircraft of the 27th Bomb Group reformed into a combat unit. In early 12 February pilots of the 91st Bombardment Squadron flew their A-24's with gunners from Brisbane to Malang Java in the colonial Dutch East Indies to defend the island. The group participated in an attack on the Japanese invasion fleet landing troops on Bali. The attacks, carried out during the afternoon of 19 February and throughout the morning of 20 February, caused little damage and all air operations that day failed to halt the landings. The group was credited with the sinking of a Japanese cruiser and a destroyer. From 27 February through 1 March, three A-24's of the 91st participated in Battle of the Java Sea. The remaining pilots and gunners of the 27th Group were flown out to Australia in early March, consolidating with the 16th and 17th Squadrons which had moved from Brisbane to Batchelor Airfield in the Northern Territory. For their heroic efforts in the Philippines and the Southwest Pacific during late 1941 and early 1942, the 27th Bombardment Group (Light) received three Distinguished Unit Citations (DUC).

On 25 March, Davies and the surviving 27th Group personnel, consisting of 42 officers, 62 enlisted men and 24 A-24s, were reassigned en masse to the four squadrons of the 3d Bombardment Group at Charters Towers Airfield in Queensland, Australia. The remaining A-24 aircraft were added to the 8th Bombardment Squadron. (Note: Davies was appointed Commander of the 3rd Group, and senior pilots from the 27th became commanders of its 8th, 13th and 90th Squadrons. Over the next 21 months they flew combat missions over the Philippines, New Guinea and Rabaul. Among many other operations, the 3rd Group played a leading role at the Battle of the Bismarck Sea.)

=== European-African-Middle Eastern Theater ===
==== North African Campaign ====
On 4 May the group moved without personnel or equipment to Hunter Field, Georgia. At Hunter, the group was remanned and re-equipped with the Douglas A-20 Havoc light bomber. After additional training in Mississippi and Louisiana, on 26 December the group was transferred to Ste-Barbe-du-Tlelat Airfield, Algeria to enter combat in North Africa with Twelfth Air Force.

Maintenance and support personnel went by sea to North Africa while aircrews and the A-20s flew to South America then across to North Africa, In North Africa, the A-20s were sent to other groups and the group was redesignated the 27th Fighter-Bomber Group and reequipped with the North American A-36 Apache dive bomber. The 27th flew its first combat missions of the war from Korba Airfield, Tunisia, on 6 June 1943.

The 27th served in the Mediterranean Theater of Operations until the end of the war. It was redesignated the 27th Fighter Group in May 1944 when the group converted first to the Curtiss P-40 Warhawk, then to the Republic P-47 Thunderbolt aircraft.

==== Sicilian/Italian Campaigns ====
During the Sicilian Campaign, operations included participation in the reduction of Pantelleria and Lampedusa Islands and supporting ground forces during the conquest of Sicily. In the Italian Campaign the 27th covered the landings at Salerno and received a DUC for preventing three German armored divisions from reaching the Salerno beachhead on 10 September 1943. In addition, the group supported the Fifth Army during the Allied drive toward Rome.

==== Southern France ====
The group took part in Operation Dragoon, the invasion of Southern France, and assisted Seventh Army's advance up the Rhone Valley, receiving another DUC for helping to disrupt the German retreat, 4 September 1944.

The 27th took part in the interdiction of the enemy's communications in northern Italy, and assisted in the Allied drive from France into Germany during the last months of the war, eventually being stationed at Biblis, Germany on V-E Day.

With five Distinguished Unit Citations and a Philippine Presidential Unit Citation, the airmen of the 27th were among the most decorated USAAF units of World War II.

=== Cold War ===
==== Postwar era ====
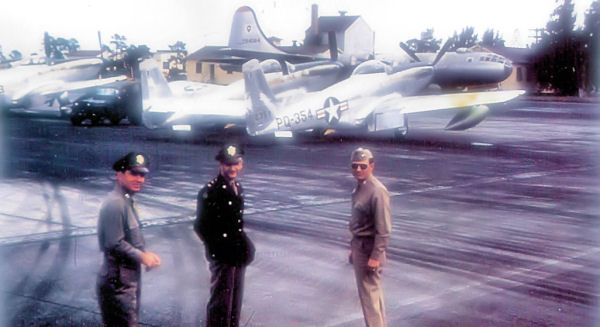
Group F-82E Twin Mustangs at Kearney AFB Nebraska. (Note: Aircraft in foreground is North American F-82E Twin Mustang, serial 46-354.)

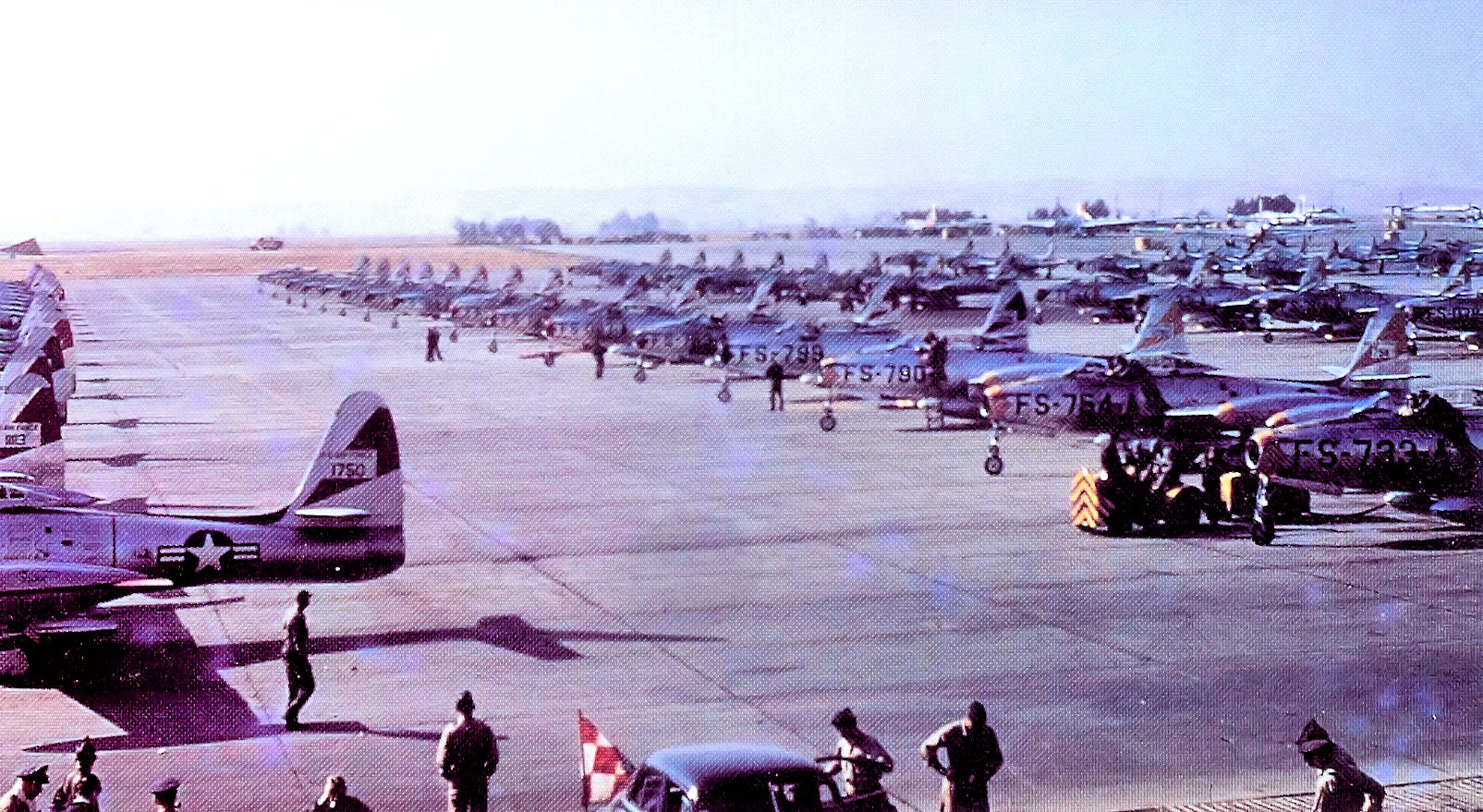
27th Fighter-Escort Group F-84Gs, Bergstrom AFB, Texas, 1952

In the immediate postwar drawdown of the USAAF, the 27th Fighter Group returned to the United States in October 1945, then inactivated on 7 November at Camp Shanks, New York. Within a year, the group was reactivated in Germany on 20 August 1946, at AAF Station Fritzlar, flying P-47 Thunderbolts.

The group stayed in Germany for a year performing occupation duty until being transferred, without personnel or equipment, to Andrews Field, Maryland, in June 1947. The 27th was assigned to Strategic Air Command (SAC) and reactivated at Kearney Army Air Field Nebraska. Fighter Squadrons of the 27th were the 522d, 523d and 524th.

The 27th was initially equipped with the North American P-51D Mustang, and in 1948 was upgraded to the new North American F-82 Twin Mustang. In June 1948 the designation "P" for pursuit was changed to "F" for fighter. Subsequently, all P-51s were redesignated F-51s. The mission of the 27th Fighter Wing was to fly long-range escort missions for SAC Boeing B-29 Superfortress bombers. With the arrival of the F-82s, the older F-51s were sent to Air National Guard units.

The first production F-82Es reached the 27th in early 1948, and almost immediately the group was deployed to McChord Air Force Base, Washington in June where its squadrons stood on alert on a secondary air defense mission due to heightened tensions over the Berlin Airlift. It was also believed that the 27th would launch an escort mission, presumably to the Soviet Union, if conflict broke out in Europe. From McChord, the group flew its Twin Mustangs on weather reconnaissance missions over the northwest Pacific, but problems were encountered with their fuel tanks. Decommissioned F-61 Black Widow external tanks were found at Hamilton Air Force Base, California that could be modified for the F-82 which were fitted on the pylons of the Twin Mustang that solved the problem. With a reduction in tensions, the 27th returned to its home base in Nebraska during September where the unit settled down to transition flying with their aircraft.

On 1 August 1948 the 27th Fighter Wing was activated. Although established over a year earlier in July 1947. Under the Hobson Plan the wing commanded the functions of both the support groups as well as the flying combat 27th Fighter Group and the squadrons assigned to it.

Four F-82s were deployed to Alaska from McChord where the pilots provided transition training to the 449th Fighter-All Weather Squadron which used Twin Mustangs in the air defense mission. They remained in Alaska for about 45 days, returning to rejoin the rest of the group at the beginning of November 1948.

In January 1949, Eighth Air Force planned a large celebration at Carswell Air Force Base. All of its assigned units were to participate in a coordinated flyover. Most of SAC's bombers were to participate, along with SAC's only "Long Range" fighter group, the 27th. The weather in Nebraska in January that year was especially horrible, with most airports in the Midwest weathered in the day of the display. At Kearney, the base was socked-in with a blizzard. Nevertheless, the crews had an early morning mission briefing, the aircraft in the hangars were preflighted and prepared for the flyover mission. Paths were cut through the snow for the aircraft to taxi and somehow the F-82s got airborne, with the 27th's Twin Mustangs joining up with SAC bombers over Oklahoma]on schedule. The flyover by the Twin Mustangs was a tremendous success, with SAC leadership being amazed that the F-82 was truly an "all weather" aircraft and the 27th being able to carry out their mission despite the weather.

In early 1949, the 27th began carrying out long-range escort profile missions. Flights to Puerto Rico, Mexico, the Bahamas and nonstop to Washington D.C were carried out. For President Truman's 1949 inauguration, the 27th FEW launched 48 aircraft to fly in review, along with several other fighter units, in formation down Pennsylvania Avenue. Another flyover over the newly -dedicated Idlewild Airport in New York City soon followed, with the aircraft flying non-stop from Kearney.

With the tight defense budgets in the late 1940s, the decision was made by Strategic Air Command decided to close Kearney in 1949. The 27th was transferred to Bergstrom Air Force Base Texas on 16 March.

At Bergstrom, the 27th transitioned to jet aircraft with Republic F-84E Thunderjets in 1950. It was redesignated the 27th Fighter-Escort Group, to better represent the mission of the group on 1 February. By the end of summer, the transition to the Thunderjets was complete and the Twin Mustangs were mostly sent to reclamation, with a few being sent to Far East Air Forces or Alaska as replacement aircraft or for air defense duties.

The wing won the Mackay Trophy for successful deployment of 180 F-84s from Bergstrom to Fürstenfeldbruck Air Base West Germany, in September 1950, via Labrador, Greenland, Iceland, and England, delivering the Thunderjets to the 36th Fighter-Bomber Group. This was the Second (Note: The first was by the 20th Fighter Group flying 64 F-84Ds on 20 July 1950 during Operation Ready from Shaw Air Force Base, South Carolina to RAF Manston, England.) long-range mass flight of jet aircraft in aviation history.

After the pilots and support ground personnel were flown back to Bergstrom on MATS transports, a new production batch of F-84Es were picked up, and on 15 October the group headed for Neubiberg Air Base, West Germany, this time with ninety-two aircraft.

==== Korean War ====
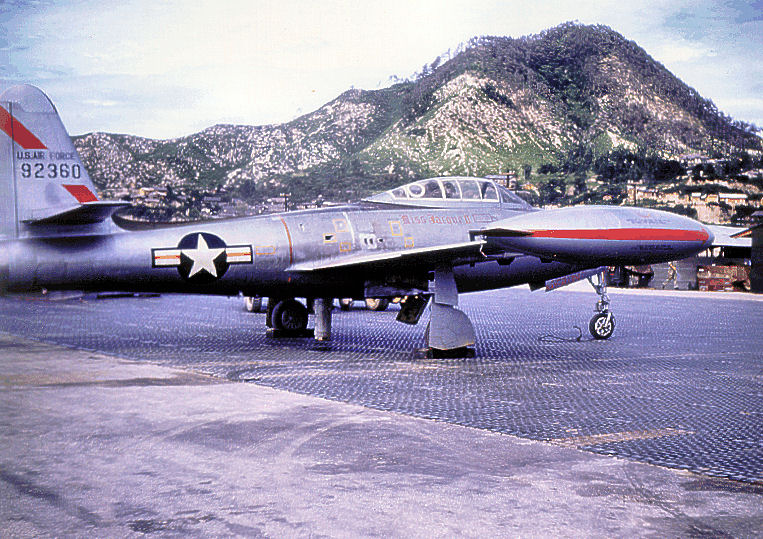
A group F-84E Thunderjet at Taegu AB, South Korea in 1951 (Note: Aircraft is Republic F-84E-15-RE Thunderjet, serial 49-2360. This was the first F-84 to fly 1000 hours in Korea. It was transferred to the Air National Guard in 1954 and to the Military Aircraft Storage and Disposal Center on 25 October 1957 for reclamation. Baugher, Joe (8 September 2023). "1949 USAF Serial Numbers". Joe Baugher.)

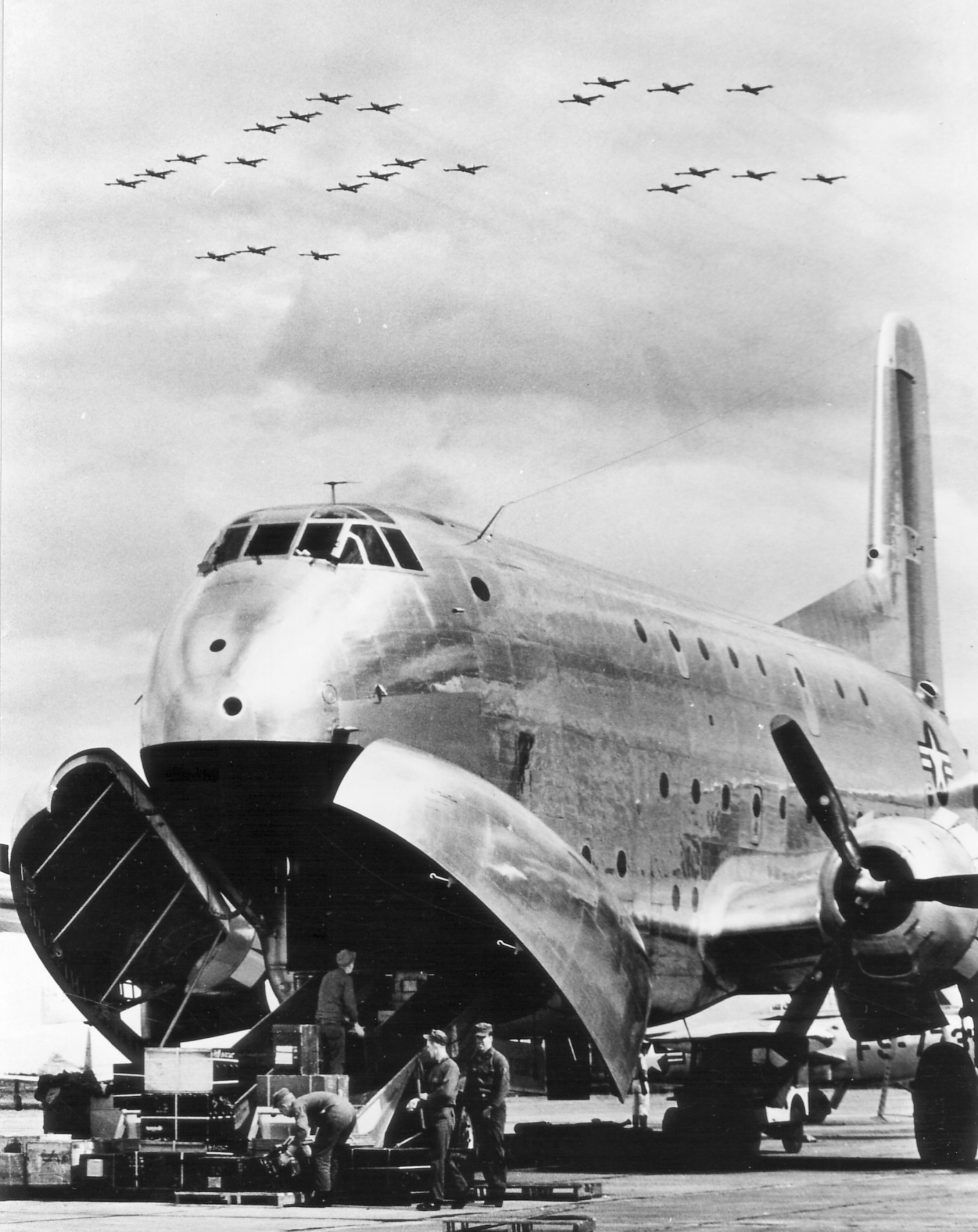
Group F-84G Thunderjets arrive at a Japan Air Defense Force base in northern Japan after completing a trans-Pacific flight.

Upon their return to Bergstrom in November 1950, the 27th anticipated another delivery trip to Europe and a permanent change of station to United States Air Forces in Europe. However, this was changed to a deployment to Japan and duty in the Korean War.

The 27th departed Bergstrom on 11 November with the 522nd Squadron refueling en route at Biggs Air Force Base, Texas; the 523rd at Kirtland Air Force Base, New Mexico, and the 524th at Williams Air Force Base, Arizona on the way to San Diego, California. The overseas transport of the 27th was via the USS Bairoko (CVE-115) on 14 November and the USS Bataan (CVL-29) on 16 November. The USS Cape Esperance (CVE-88), with the remainder of the wing was scheduled to depart from San Francisco on 27 November, but this was delayed for two days while fifty North American F-86A Sabres and their equipment for the 4th Fighter-Interceptor Wing were loaded for their transfer to Japan.

By 30 November the ground echelon had arrived at Kimpo Air Base (K-14), South Korea, preparing for the arrival of the air echelon which had been unloaded in Japan. Once unloaded from the transport carriers, the aircraft were barged to Kisarazu Air Base where they were preflighted for a short flight to Yokota Air Base. However the aircraft were damaged during their trans-Pacific open-air deck shipment and had salt air induced corrosion; corroded electrical equipment and landing gear damage. Some of the aircraft also had flat tires. On 1 December Far East Air Forces decided they would station their short-ranged 4th Group at Kimpo and the 27th was ordered split into forward and rear echelons. Advanced headquarters would be at Taegu Air Base (K-2), South Korea; while the rear echelon would locate at Itazuke Air Base, Japan. The advanced echelon would be attached to the Lockheed F-80 Shooting Star equipped 49th Fighter-Bomber Wing at Tageu for logistical support, while the rear portion would be attached to the 6160th Air Base Wing at Itazuke for the same kind of support.

The first six of rapidly repaired F-84Es arrived at K-2 on 5 December. All of these aircraft were equipped with special gun camera that were depressed to record bomb strikes. They were also JATO-equipped with a special electronic system for their operation. The 27th flew their first combat mission on 6 December 1950; the mission being an armed reconnaissance over the Chinnampo River area. Over the next two days, thirty-two rockets and 7,200 rounds of .50 caliber ammunition were expended. Several locomotives were claimed as damaged and a North Korean village was strafed.

On 13 December two 27th Thunderjets were lost on a strafing mission two miles west of Krin-ni when the aircraft did not return and crashed to the ground. One aircraft crashed on the ground; the cause not known; another was given a go-around at K-2 because of other traffic. The aircraft suddenly lost power and made a belly landing in a dry creek bed; the Thunderjet written-off as a result. By January, the remainder of the 27th's aircraft were made operational.

For the next six months, the 27th flew missions in support of ground forces, earning another DUC for missions between 26 January and 21 April 1951. Among these missions was close support of the largest paratroop landing in the Korean War and escort for Boeing B-29 Superfortress bombers on raids over North Korea, including air-to-air combat with enemy MiG-15 fighters.

In June the 27th was given the responsibility for acclimating the newly arrived 136th Fighter-Bomber Wing to combat, as the 136th was their replacement. They were also given the responsibility of assisting the 49th Fighter-Bomber Wing in transition from F-80Cs to F-84Es. In eight months of combat, the 27th had participated in three major campaigns and earned the Republic of Korea Presidential Unit Citation. They had flown 12,000 combat missions and had lost seven of their pilots in combat, and fifteen F-84 aircraft to all causes.

The 27th was relieved from assignment to FEAF in July 1951 and returned to Bergstrom AFB. On 3 August the 27th was declared non-operational when its squadrons were attached for operational control to the 27th Fighter-Escort Wing as part of the Air Force dual deputate reorganization. It was inactivated on 16 June 1952 when the group was considered redundant.

==== The 1990s ====
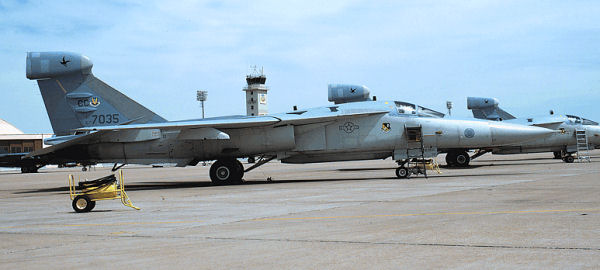
EF-111A of the 429th Electronic Combat Squadron (Note: Aircraft is General Dynamics F-111A, serial 67-0035. Modified as EF-111A and named Ye Old Crow, later Angel of the Night. It was sent to the Aerospace Maintenance and Regeneration Center on 14 April 1998 and scrapped on 19 February 2013. Baugher, Joe (18 July 2023). "1967 USAF Serial Numbers". Joe Baugher.)

The group was reactivated in on 1 November 1991 as the 27th Operations Group and assigned to the 27th Fighter Wing as part of the Objective Wing Reorganization adapted by the Air Force. The group took control of the wing's fighter squadrons upon activation.

From September 1992 to July 1993, the group's F-111 aircrews and support personnel rotated to Incirlik Air Base, Turkey, in support of Operation Provide Comfort in northern Iraq.

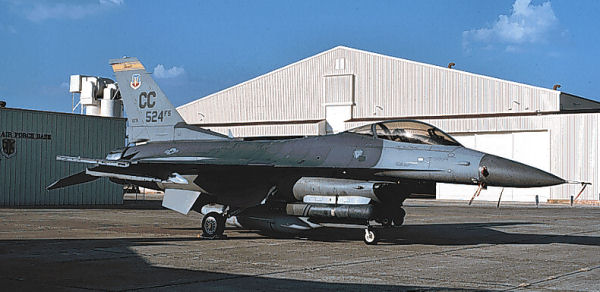
F-16C of the 524th Fighter Squadron (Note: General Dynamics F-16C Block 40B Fighting Falcon, serial 88-0416. This was the first F-16 delivered to the 524th.)

In 1995 the face of the flightline changed when the wing began its transition to General Dynamics F-16 Fighting Falcon fighter aircraft. The first F-16s to arrive in May were assigned to the 522d Fighter Squadron. Also transitioning were the 523d and 524th Fighter Squadrons. With the arrival of the F-16s, the F-111s were sent to the Aerospace Maintenance and Regeneration Center in Arizona. The 428th Fighter Squadron was inactivated in September 1995, and the electronic combat EF-111A-equipped 429th Electronic Combat Squadron was inactivated in May 1998 with the 27th Operations Group holding a retirement ceremony in memorial park. The F-111 in various forms had been at Cannon for 29 years. With their retirement, the 430th Electronic Combat Squadron was inactivated.

On 15 January 1998, the 524th Fighter Squadron ventured to the desert for their first overseas deployment since transitioning to the F-16. The 522d Fighter Squadron deployed to Prince Sultan Air Base, Saudi Arabia in direct support of Operation Southern Watch. They flew missions enforcing United Nations resolutions of no-fly zone over Southern Iraq. In March, the 523d Fighter Squadron also deployed to Southwest Asia in support of Operation Southern Watch.

These two squadrons were the first F-16 unit to replace Fairchild Republic A-10 Thunderbolt II units performing close air support. In addition, they were the first F-16 unit to maintain the demanding combat search and rescue alert in Southwest Asia. While deployed to the Gulf region in December 1998, the F-16s from the 522d Fighter Squadron provided close air support alert, defensive counter air alert and interdiction in Iraq.

In August 1998, the 524th Fighter Squadron deployed to Hill Air Force Base, Utah for exercise Combat Hammer. During the exercise, they dropped inert GBU-24 Paveway III laser-guided bombs and fired live AGM-65 Maverick antitank missiles on Utah test range. The hit rate was one of the highest ever seen in the Air Force, showcasing the lethality of the Block 40 F-16.

In 1998, the governments of the United States and Singapore signed an agreement laying the foundation of the Peace Carvin III program. As a Foreign Military Sales training program for the Republic of Singapore Air Force (RSAF), Peace Carvin III was designed for the continued training of RSAF in rapid deployment and tactical employment of the block 52 F-16C/D throughout a wide spectrum of missions including air-to-air, joint maritime and precision air-to-ground weapons delivery.

In support of Peace Carvin III, the 428th Fighter Squadron' was reactivated on 12 November 1998 and tasked to take the lead in Peace Carvin III. The squadron was a hybrid of USAF and RSAF F-16C/D manned by USAF instructor pilots, Singaporean pilots and combined RSAF and USAF teams of maintenance and support personnel. In May 1999, the 428th participated in its first official major exercise after its reactivation. The squadron deployed to Tyndall Air Force Base, Florida, for exercise Combat Archer. The exercise was designed to test weapons capabilities, tactics and employment. This included the first live firing of radar-guided air-to-air AIM-7 Sparrow by the RSAF. With the completion of Peace Carvin III, the 428th was inactivated on 6 July 2005.

In July 1999, the 522d Fighter Squadron deployed to Naval Air Station Keflavik, Iceland, to support NATO exercise Coronet Norsemen. They served primarily as the combat air arm of the Iceland Defense Force. In August 1999, the 523d Fighter Squadron relieved the 522d Fighter Squadron from Coronet Norsemen.

During Operation Allied Force in the former Yugoslavia in 1999, the 524th Fighter Squadron was notified for "on-call" duty to augment forces. Quick termination of hostilities precluded the 524th Fighter Squadron from seeing action.

==== Twenty-first century ====
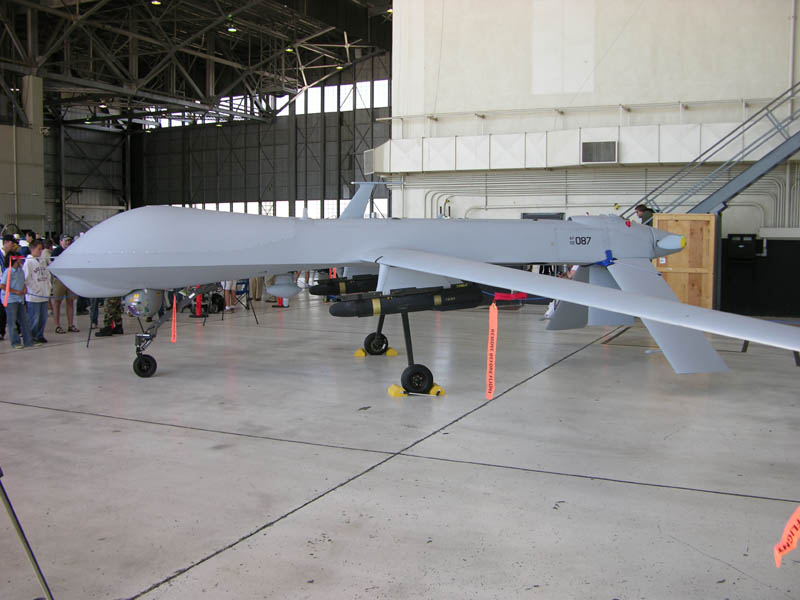
MQ-1 Predator, with inert Hellfire missiles, on display

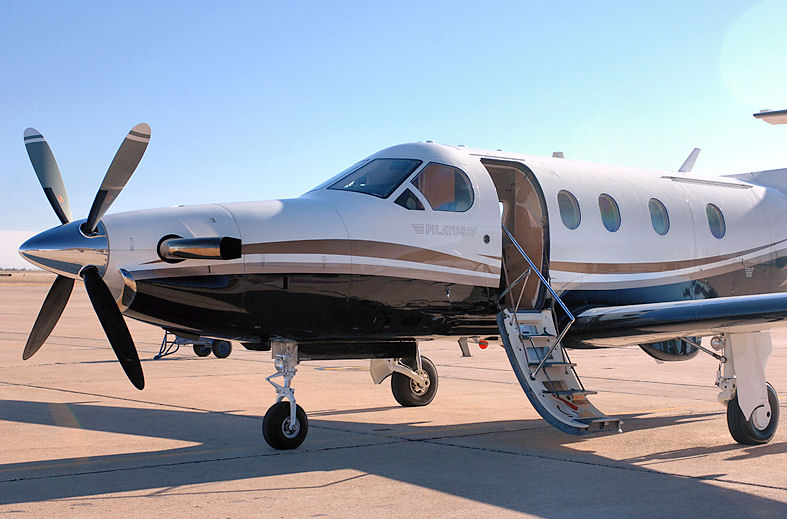
A PC-12 Pilatus parks on Cannon's flightline

On 11 September 2001 when terrorists attacked the World Trade Center in New York City and The Pentagon in Washington, D.C., aircraft from the 27th went on air defense alert. Two weeks following the 9/11 attacks members of the 27th Civil Engineer Squadron Prime BEEF team had deployed to a forward location in the AOR and built a tent city at a (then) classified location. They would not return till March 2002.

In December 2002, the 524 FS deployed to Kuwait and participated in Operation Iraqi Freedom, dropping nearly a million pounds of precision guided munitions, more than any other F-16 Block 40 squadron in history. In September 2007, the 522d Expeditionary Fighter Squadron wrapped up the final deployment for their squadron and, ultimately, the 27th Operations Group.

The 522d Fighter Squadron, known as the Fireballs, were inactivated upon their return to Cannon and the 27th became the 27th Special Operations Group on 1 October 2007. Among the units that joined the group were the 3d Special Operations Squadron (MQ-1), 73d Special Operations Squadron (MC-130W) and 318th Special Operations Squadron (light transport aircraft) as well as the 20th Special Operations Squadron (CV-22s).

Today there are twelve squadrons within the group:

27th Special Operations Support Squadron (27 SOSS) – provides operational support to flight operations
3d Special Operations Squadron – MQ-9 Reaper
6th Special Operations Squadron - MC-130J
9th Special Operations Squadron – MC-130J Commando II
12th Special Operations Squadron, provides remotely piloted aircraft launch and recovery operations
16th Special Operations Squadron – AC-130J
17th Special Operations Squadron - AC-130J
20th Special Operations Squadron – CV-22 Osprey
33d Special Operations Squadron – MQ-9 Reaper
56th Special Operations Intelligence Squadron
310th Special Operations Squadron - U-28A
318th Special Operations Squadron – U-28A

== Lineage ==
- Established as 27th Bombardment Group (Light) on 22 December 1939

Activated on 1 February 1940
Redesignated: 27th Fighter Bomber Group on 23 August 1943
Redesignated: 27th Fighter Group on 30 May 1944
Inactivated on 7 November 1945

- Activated on 20 August 1946

Redesignated 27th Fighter-Escort Group on 1 February 1950
Inactivated on 16 June 1952

- Redesignated: 27th Tactical Fighter Group on 31 July 1985 (Remained inactive)
- Redesignated: 27th Operations Group on 28 October 1991

Activated on 1 November 1991
Redesignated 27th Special Operations Group on 1 October 2007

=== Assignments ===
- Southeast Air District (later, 3 Air Force), 1 February 1940
- 3d Air Support Command, 1 September 1941
- V Bomber Command, c. 20 November 1941 (Ground echelon attached to: V Interceptor Command, 24 December 1941 – 8 May 1942, Air echelon under operational control of American-British-Dutch-Australian Command, c. March-4 May 1942)
- 3d Air Force, 4 May 1942
- 3d Bomber Command, 7 July 1942
- III Ground Air Support Command (later III Air Support Command), 10 August 1942
- Twelfth Air Force, c. 25 December 1942
- XII Air Support Command (later XII Tactical Air Command), July 1943
- XII Fighter Command (later XXII Tactical Air Command), 20 September 1944 (Attached to XII Tactical Air Command, 20 September-2 October 1944)
- 63d Fighter Wing (Attached to First Tactical Air Force (Provisional), 21 February 1945)
- XII Tactical Air Command, 30 March 1945
- 64th Fighter Wing, 7 July–October 1945; 20 August 1946
- Strategic Air Command, 25 June 1947
- Eighth Air Force, 16 July 1947
- 27th Fighter Wing (later 27th Fighter-Escort Wing), 15 August 1947 – 16 June 1952
- 27th Fighter Wing (later 27th Special Operations Wing), 1 November 1991 – present

=== Components ===
- 11th Reconnaissance Squadron (later 91st Bombardment Squadron, 524th Fighter-Bomber Squadron, 524th Fighter Squadron, 524th Fighter-Escort Squadron, 524th Fighter Squadron 524th Special Operations Squadron): attached, 15 January 1941; assigned 14 January 1941 – 7 November 1945[sic]; 20 August 1946 – 16 June 1952 (detached, 25 August 1951 – 16 June 1952); 1 November 1991 – 30 September 2007
- 15th Bombardment Squadron: 1 February 1940 – 14 October 1941
- 16th Bombardment Squadron (later 522d Fighter-Bomber Squadron, 522d Fighter Squadron, 522d Fighter-Escort Squadron, 522d Fighter Squadron): 1 February 1940 – 7 November 1945; 20 August 1946 – 16 June 1952 (detached, 6 August 1951 – 16 June 1952); 1 November 1991 – 30 September 2007
- 17th Bombardment Squadron (later 523d Fighter-Bomber Squadron 523d Fighter Squadron, 523d Fighter-Escort Squadron, 523d Fighter Squadron): 1 February 1940 – 7 November 1945; 20 August 1946 – 16 June 1952 (detached, 6 August 1951 – 16 June 1952); 1 November 1991 – 30 September 2007
- 428th Fighter Squadron: 1 November 1991 – 12 October 1995; 15 September 1998 – 30 September 2007
- 429th Electronic Combat Squadron: 22 June 1993 – 19 June 1998
- 430th Electronic Combat Squadron: 1 August 1992 – 29 June 1993
- 465th Bombardment Squadron: 13 July - 21 November 1942

=== Stations ===
- Barksdale Field, Louisiana, 1 February 1940
- Hunter Field, Georgia, 7 October 1940 – 21 October 1941
- Philippines Commonwealth, 20 November 1941 (ground echelon at Fort William McKinley, Luzon; (Note: Assigned as ground forces as 27th Bombardment Group Provisional Infantry Regiment (Air Corp), Bataan, on 24 December 1941 – 8 May 1942) air echelon diverted to: Archerfield Airport, Australia, 24 December 1941– March 1942)
- Batchelor Airfield, Australia, March-4 May 1942
- Hunter Field, Georgia, 4 May 1942
- Key Field, Mississippi, c. 14 July 1942
- Hattiesburg Army Air Field, Mississippi, 15 August 1942
- Harding Field, Louisiana, 25 October-21 November 1942
- Ste-Barbe-du-Tlelat Airfield, Algeria, 26 December 1942
- Nouvion Airfield, Algeria, January 1943
- Ras el Ma Airfield, French Morocco, c. 4 April 1943
- Korba Airfield, Tunisia, June 1943
- Ponte Olivo Airfield, Sicily, Italy, July 1943
- Capaccio Airfield, Italy, September 1943
- Guado Airfield, Italy, 4 November 1943
- Pomigliano Airfield, Italy, 19 January 1944
- Castel Volturno Airfield, Italy, 10 April 1944
- Santa Maria Airfield, Italy, 8 May 1944
- La Banca Airfield, Italy, 7 June 1944
- Rome Ciampino Airport, Italy, 12 June 1944
- Serragia Airfield, Corsica, France, July 1944
- Le Luc Airfield, France, August 1944
- Salon de Provence Airfield (ALG Y-16), France, 30 April 1944
- Loyettes Airfield (ALG Y-25), France, c. 11 September 1944
- Tarquinia Airfield, Italy, October 1944
- Pontedera Airfield, Italy, 3 December 1944
- St-Dizier Airfield (A-64), France, c. 22 February 1945
- Toul-Ochey Airfield (A-96), France, c. 19 March 1945
- Biblis Airfield (Y-78), Germany, April 1945
- AAF Station Mannheim/Sandhofen, Germany, 24 June 1945
- AAF Station Echterdingen, Germany, 15 September-20 October 1945
- Camp Shanks, New York, 6–7 November 1945
- AAF Station Fritzlar, Germany, 20 August 1946 – 25 June 1947
- Andrews Field, Maryland, 25 June 1947
- Kearney Army Air Field (later Kearney Air Force Base), Nebraska, 16 July 1947
- Bergstrom Air Force Base, Texas, 16 March 1949 – 11 November 1950
- Taegu Air Base (K-2), South Korea, 5 December 1950
- Itazuke Air Base, Japan, 31 January – 2 July 1951
- Bergstrom Air Force Base, Texas, 6 July 1951 – 16 June 1952
- Cannon Air Force Base, New Mexico, 1 November 1991 – present

=== Aircraft ===
- Douglas A-24 Dauntless, 1941
- Douglas A-20 Havoc, 1941, 1942–1943
- North American A-36 Apache, 1943–1944
- Curtiss P-40 Warhawk, 1944
- Republic P-47 Thunderbolt, 1944–1947
- North American P-51 (later F-51) Mustang, 1947–1949
- North American F-82 Twin Mustang, 1948–1950
- Republic F-84 Thunderjet, 1950–1951
- North American F-100 Super Sabre, 1958-1970
- General Dynamics F-111 Aardvark, 1969–1996
- General Dynamics EF-111 Raven, 1992–1998
- General Dynamics F-16 Falcon, 1995–2007
