= Le Luc – Le Cannet Airport =

Le Luc - Le Cannet Airport Base école Général Lejay
- IATA: none; ICAO: LFMC

Summary
- Airport type: Public / military
- Operator: Ministry of Defence
- Serves: Le Luc, France
- Location: Le Cannet-des-Maures
- Elevation AMSL: 265 ft / 81 m
- Coordinates: 43°23′05″N 006°23′13″E

Map
- Location in Provence-Alpes-Côte d'Azur region Provence-Alpes-Côte d’Azur in France

Runways
Direction	Length		Surface
Direction	m	ft	Surface
13/31	1,399	4,590	Asphalt
09/27	800	2,625	Asphalt
- Source: AIP France

Le Luc-Le Cannet Airport (ICAO: LFMC) is an airport located at Le Cannet-des-Maures, 6 km (4 mi) east of Le Luc, in the Var department of the Provence-Alpes-Côte d'Azur region in southern France. The airport is open to public air traffic, but has no commercial airline service. It also has military use as part of Base école Général Lejay, a French Army (Armée de Terre) training facility for combat helicopters and various ground equipment.

== History ==
Le Luc Airport was built prior to World War II and was seized by Allied Forces during Operation Dragoon, the invasion of Southern France in August 1944. After minimal repairs by the United States Army Air Forces Twelfth Air Force XII Engineer Command, it was turned over for operations use by XII Fighter Command on 22 August. It was not given an advanced landing ground designation. Known units assigned to the airfield were:

- 27th Fighter Group, August 1944, A-36 Apache
- 324th Fighter Group, 25 August-2 September 1944, P-47 Thunderbolt

With the combat units moving quickly up into Eastern France, the airport was returned to French civil control on 13 September.

== Facilities ==
The airport resides at an elevation of 265 feet (81 m) above mean sea level. It has two paved runways: 13/31 measures 1,399 by 30 metres (4,590 ft × 98 ft) and 09/27 is 800 by 30 metres (2,625 ft × 98 ft).
