= Capaccio Airfield =

Capaccio Airfield
- Part of Twelfth Air Force

Site information
- Type: Military Airfield
- Controlled by: United States Army Air Forces

Location
- Coordinates: 40°25′16.25″N 015°00′20.34″E

Site history
- Built: 1943
- In use: 1943-1944

Location of Capaccio Airfield, Italy

Capaccio Airfield is an abandoned military airfield in Italy, located about 7 km west of Capaccio in southern Italy. Its precise location is undetermined

It was used by the United States Army Air Force Twelfth Air Force 27th Fighter Bomber Group between September and November 1943 flying A-36 Apaches during the Italian Campaign. From Capaccio, the unit supported ground troops, harassed enemy supply lines, patrolled beaches and provided cover for invading forces at Salarno Harbor.

The airfield was dismantled when the 27th moved north to Guado Airfield in central Italy. Today, the location of the airfield is unknown, as agriculture has taken over the landscape and no indications of its existence remain.
