= Bergstrom Air Force Base =

Former airbase of the United States Air Force in Austin, Texas

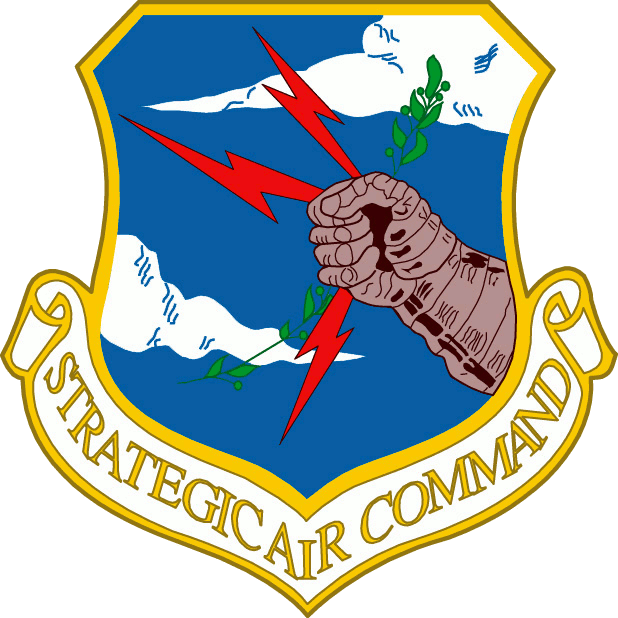
Bergstrom Air Force Base Del Valle/Bergstrom Army Airfield
- Part of Strategic Air Command/Tactical Air Command
- Austin, Texas
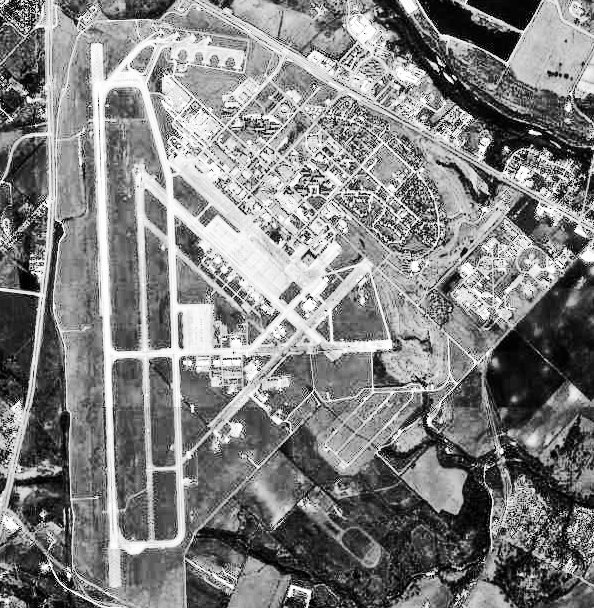
- Aerial view of Bergstrom Air Force Base

Site information
- Type: Air Force Base
- Owner: City of Austin, Texas
- Condition: Civil Airport

Location
- Location within Texas
- Coordinates: 30°11′40″N 097°40′12″W

Site history
- Built: 1942
- In use: 1942–1993

Bergstrom Air Force Base (IATA: BSM, ICAO: KBSM, FAA LID: BSM) was located seven miles southeast of Austin, Texas. In its later years, it was a major base for the United States Air Force (USAF) RF-4C Phantom reconnaissance fighter fleet.

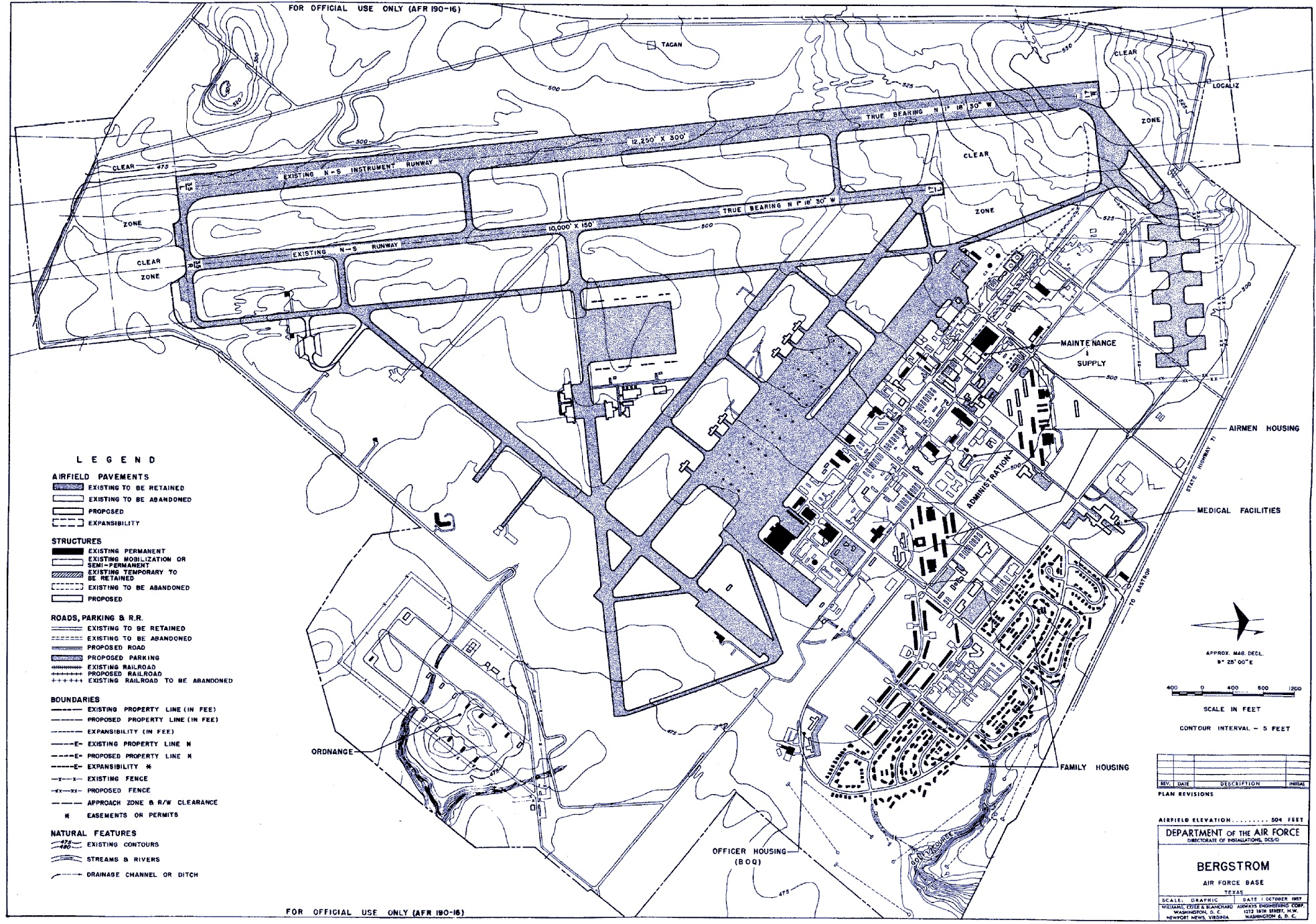
Bergstrom Air Force Base blueprint, 1957

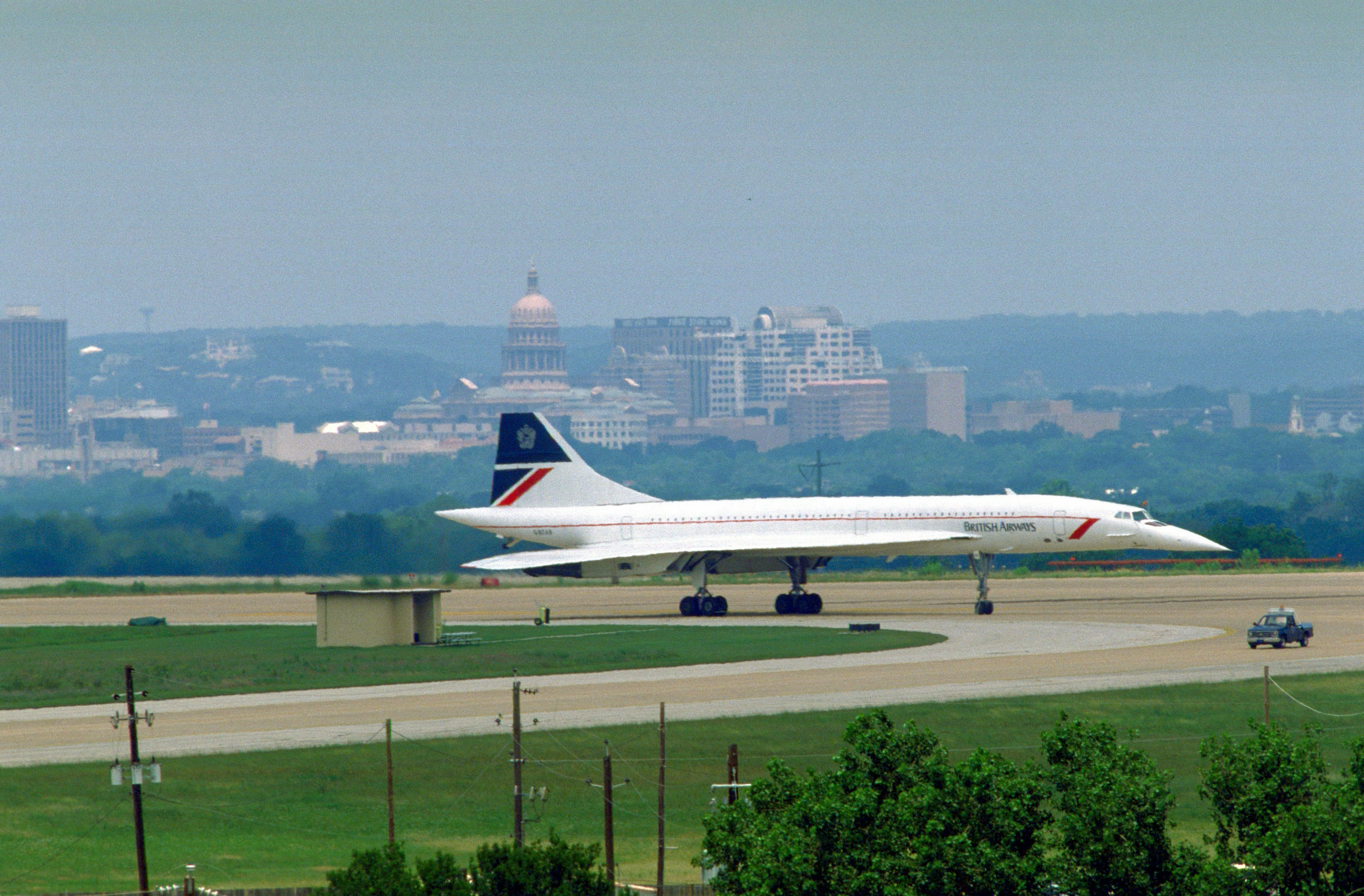
A British Airways Concorde on base.

== History ==
=== Establishment ===
Bergstrom, seven miles outside of Austin in Travis County, was originally activated on September 19, 1942, as Del Valle Army Air Base. The United States Army leased 3,000 acres (1,200 ha) from the city of Austin, on land acquired from the Santiago Del Valle Grant. The Chisholm Trail ran through the tract. The name of the base was changed to Bergstrom Army Air Field on March 3, 1943, in honor of Austinite captain John August Earl Bergstrom, who was killed at Clark Field, Philippines, during one of the early Japanese bombings at the start of World War II. Bergstrom was a member of the 19th Bombardment Group.

=== Under the Bergstrom Name ===
The base was renamed Bergstrom Field on November 11, 1943 at the suggestion of then-Congressman Lyndon B. Johnson. It became Bergstrom Air Force Base in December 1948, coinciding with the creating of the USAF as a separate service. Initially, Bergstrom was the home of troop carrier units, some of which participated in the Berlin Airlift. The base was transferred to Strategic Air Command (SAC) in 1949, followed by the arrival of the 27th Fighter Wing on March 1 of that year. The 12th Fighter-Escort Wing arrived at the base in December 1950. On July 1, 1957, the base was transferred from SAC to Tactical Air Command (TAC). The 27th Fighter Wing received new F-101A and F-101C Voodoo fighter aircraft directly from the McDonnell factory. Four squadrons flew the Voodoo under the 27th, the 481st, 522nd, 523rd, and 524th Fighter Squadrons. The Voodoos had a short run at Bergstrom, being sent to the UK as a nuclear deterrent in 1958.

On October 1, 1958, the base came under SAC control again, and the 4130th Strategic Wing moved in. Flying under the Second Air Force, the unit flew B-52 Stratofortress bombers and KC-135 Stratotanker aerial refueling aircraft. The 4130th was dissolved and its assets and personnel became the 340th Bombardment Wing, Heavy on September 1, 1963. On July 1, 1966, the base was once again transferred back to TAC, becoming home to the Twelfth Air Force and the 75th Tactical Reconnaissance Wing (TRW). The 12th was the controlling organization responsible for all TAC reconnaissance, fighter, and airlift operations west of the Mississippi River. On July 15, 1971, the 75 TRW was replaced by the 67 TRW. The base became the primary tactical reconnaissance base in the entire USAF. Four squadrons equipped with the RF-4C Phantom operated under the 67th, the 12th Tactical Reconnaissance Squadron (TRS), the 45th Tactical Reconnaissance Training Squadron (TRTS), the 62nd TRTS, and the 91st TRS. Co-located was the Air Force Reserve's 924th Tactical Airlift Group as of October 8, 1976, flying C-130 Hercules transports. The 924th changed missions and designations in September 1981, becoming the 924th Tactical Fighter Group flying the F-4D and then F-4E Phantom. Bergstrom hosted the Reconnaissance Air Meet (RAM) in 1986, 1988, and 1990. RAM was a competition between the USAF, Air National Guard, United States Navy, United States Marine Corps, and select foreign reconnaissance units. A drawdown of USAF tactical reconnaissance, hastened by the end of the Cold War, saw the 45TRTS and 62TRTS disband, followed by the 91TRS. The 12TRS deployed its RF-4Cs to the Middle East in support of Operation Desert Shield/Desert Storm in 1991. Shortly after their return from the desert, the 12th and its parent 67TRW were re-designated 12 Reconnaissance Squadron and 67 Reconnaissance Wing, respectively. Shortly after, both organizations were disbanded.

=== Later years ===
In the 1960s, Bergstrom AFB became the place where Air Force One often flew into and out of. It was also the airfield that Lyndon B. Johnson flew into and out of when he was president, traveling between Washington and his ranch in Texas.

During the 1970s, Austin's municipal airport became crowded and noise complaints increased. The city approached the USAF in 1978 to propose a shared civil-military airport at Bergstrom, but the original proposal and further ones in 1981 and 1984 were all rejected. In 1979, the Concorde visited Bergstrom, followed by the Space Shuttles Columbia and Discovery on their Shuttle Carrier Aircraft in 1981 and 1985, respectively.

In 1990, Bergstrom ended up on a list of 75 military facilities under study for closure by the 1991 Base Realignment and Closure Commission which led to economic concerns for the region. On September 30, 1993, Bergstrom was officially closed and a bond was raised for Austin-Bergstrom International Airport, which was the first airport built after BRAC.

A small portion of Bergstrom Air Force Base houses the Austin Armed Forces Reserve Center (AFRC) and Joint Vehicle Maintenance Facility (JVMF). The 209,000 square foot facility is home to the Reserve Component units like the Texas Army National Guard 36th Combat Aviation Brigade Headquarters. The facilities serve members of the Texas Army National Guard, Army Reserve, Navy Reserve and Marine Corps Reserve.

== See also ==
- Central Air Defense Force (Air Defense Command)
- Texas World War II Army Airfields
- I Troop Carrier Command
