= Biblis Airfield =

Biblis Airfield (Y-78)

- Rhineland-Palatinate, Germany Biblis Airfield (Germany)

Site information
- Type: Military Airfield
- Controlled by: United States Army Air Forces

Location
- Coordinates: 49°40′44″N 008°27′05″E

Site history
- Built: 1945
- Built by: IX Engineering Command
- In use: April–July 1945
- Materials: SOD/SMT

Biblis Airfield is an abandoned World War II military airfield located in Germany, approximately 5 miles northeast of Worms (Rheinland-Pfalz); approximately 300 miles southwest of Berlin.

Bibliser Airfield, known in German as “Bibliser Flugplatz,” was built by the United States Army Air Forces at the site of a Wehrmacht Army Barracks (Biblis Kaserne). It was also the first USAAF airfield to be built in support of Seventh Army operations east of the Rhine River after two divisions crossed the river near Worms on 26 March 1945. It was a vital airfield used in the encirclement of the Ruhr Pocket during the Western Allied invasion of Germany, in which more than 300,000 German troops were taken as prisoners.

After being closed in July 1945, the facility was eventually abandoned. Today, it is the site of a sports complex to the south of Biblis.

== History ==
The airfield was laid out very quickly at a captured German Army Barracks (Kaserne), just to the south of Biblis after the Rhine crossing. The 850th Engineer Aviation Battalion arrived at the site on 1 April 1945 and on 2 April they had laid down a 5,000-foot (1,500 m) square-mesh track and sod runway, using the captured army buildings as a support area. The airfield was designated as Advanced Landing Ground "Y-78 Biblis "

The Twelfth Air Force 27th Fighter Bomber Group moved in almost immediately with its A-36 Apache ground-attack aircraft (a version of the P-51C Mustang optimized for ground support) and began flying missions in the Ruhr. The 27th attacked enemy troop formations, motorized vehicles, armored vehicles and bridges to keep the German forces pinned down while the United States First and Ninth Armies moved up to meet the British XXIst Army Group coming down from the north. By 4 April the encirclement was complete, and for the next two weeks the pocket was made smaller and smaller, eventually forcing the surrender of over 300,000 German troops and their equipment.

The Allied victory in the Ruhr essentially eliminated serious opposition by the German Armed forces in Western Germany and afterward American ground forces swept east into Central Germany and Southern Germany, while British and Commonwealth forces moved into northern Germany against little organized resistance.

The 27th Fighter Bomber Group continued operations from Biblis supporting American forces as they advanced through Germany until the end of combat on 7 May. The unit remained at the airfield until the end of June when it returned to the United States. The airfield was closed in July and abandoned.

After the war, the area was completely reconstructed and all of the military buildings, and airfield were removed. The site is now occupied by agricultural fields and a small forest. An antenna on the former airfield grounds is reportedly used by a German-American radio station. The airfield's HQ now shelters a restaurant, stables for horse riding and training.

== See also ==
- Advanced Landing Ground
