= Pontedera Airfield =

Abandoned military airfield in Italy

Pontedera Airfield
- Part of Twelfth Air Force

Site information
- Type: Military airfield
- Controlled by: United States Army Air Forces

Location
- Coordinates: 43°39′28.80″N 010°37′05.69″E

Site history
- Built: 1943
- In use: 1943-1944

Location of Pontedera Airfield, Italy

Pontedera Airfield is an abandoned military airfield in Italy, located within the town of Pontedera, in Tuscany in the administrative province of Pisa.

It was an all-weather temporary field built by the XII Engineer Command using a graded earth compacted surface, with a prefabricated hessian (burlap) surfacing known as PHS. PHS was made of an asphalt-impregnated jute which was rolled out over the compacted surface over a square mesh track (SMT) grid of wire joined in 3-inch squares. Pierced Steel Planking was also used for parking areas, as well as for dispersal sites, when it was available. In addition, tents were used for billeting and also for support facilities; an access road was built to the existing road infrastructure; a dump for supplies, ammunition, and gasoline drums, along with a drinkable water and minimal electrical grid for communications and station lighting.

Once completed it was turned over for use by the Twelfth Air Force 27th Fighter Group in late 1944 and early 1945 during the Italian Campaign, flying P-47 Thunderbolts. It was also the home of the 416th Night Fighter Squadron, which flew Bristol Beaufighters from the field between 27 March and 13 August 1945.

Today, the location of the airfield has been absorbed into the town. There is the remains of one runway visible in an industrial area.
