= Ras el Ma Airfield =

WWII airfield in Morocco

Ras el Ma Airfield
- Part of Twelfth Air Force

Site information
- Type: Military airfield
- Controlled by: United States Army Air Forces

Location
- Coordinates: 35°08′18.23″N 002°25′08.36″W

Site history
- Built: 1942
- In use: 1942-1943

Location of Ras el Ma Airfield, Morocco

Ras el Ma Airfield is an abandoned World War II military airfield in Morocco, located in the southeast suburbs of Ras Kebdana. The airfield served as a support facility for the port, allowing Allied aircraft to be assembled and parepared for combat duty, then flown from the airstrip as replacements during the North African Campaign.

The United States Army Air Force Twelfth Air Force also used the airfield to re-equip the 27th Bombardment Group with the A-36 Apache close air support variant of the P-51 Mustang in April 1943. Once the unit was successfully transitioned from its A-20 Havoc light bombers, it was reassigned back to combat duty at Korba, Tunisia.
