= North American A-36 =

1942 attack aircraft model by North American Aviation

A-36 Mustang/Invader
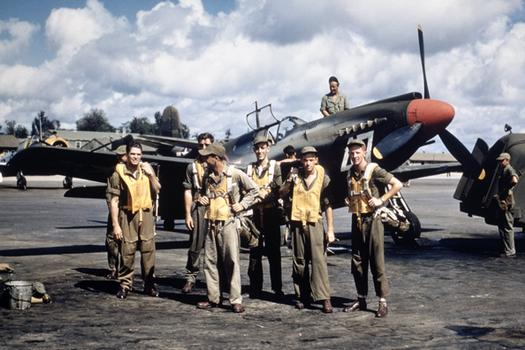
- North American A-36A

General information
- Type: Ground-attack/dive bomber
- Manufacturer: North American Aviation
- Designer: Edgar Schmued
- Primary user: United States Army Air Forces
- Number built: 500

History
- Introduction date: 1942
- First flight: October 1942
- Retired: 1945
- Developed from: North American P-51 Mustang

The North American A-36 (company designation NA-97, listed in some sources as "Apache" or "Invader", but officially called Mustang) is the ground-attack/dive bomber version of the North American P-51 Mustang, from which it could be distinguished by the presence of rectangular, slatted dive brakes above and below the wings. A total of 500 A-36 dive bombers served in the Mediterranean and Southeast Asia theaters during World War II before being withdrawn from operational use in 1944.

The A-36 project was a stopgap measure intended to keep North American Aviation (NAA) assembly lines running during the first half of 1942 despite the US having exhausted its funds earmarked for fighter aircraft.

== Design and development ==
With the introduction of the North American Mustang Mk I with the Royal Air Force's Army Co-operation Squadrons in February 1942, the new fighter began combat missions as a low-altitude reconnaissance and ground-support aircraft. Supplementing the Curtiss P-40 Tomahawks already in service, Mustang Mk Is were first supplied to No. 26 Squadron RAF, then rapidly deployed to 10 additional squadrons by June 1942. First used in combat over the Dieppe Raid on 19 August 1942, a Mustang of No. 414 (RCAF) Squadron downed one Focke-Wulf Fw 190, the first victory for a Mustang. Despite the limited high-altitude performance of the Allison V-1710 engine, the RAF was enthusiastic about its new mount, which "performed magnificently".

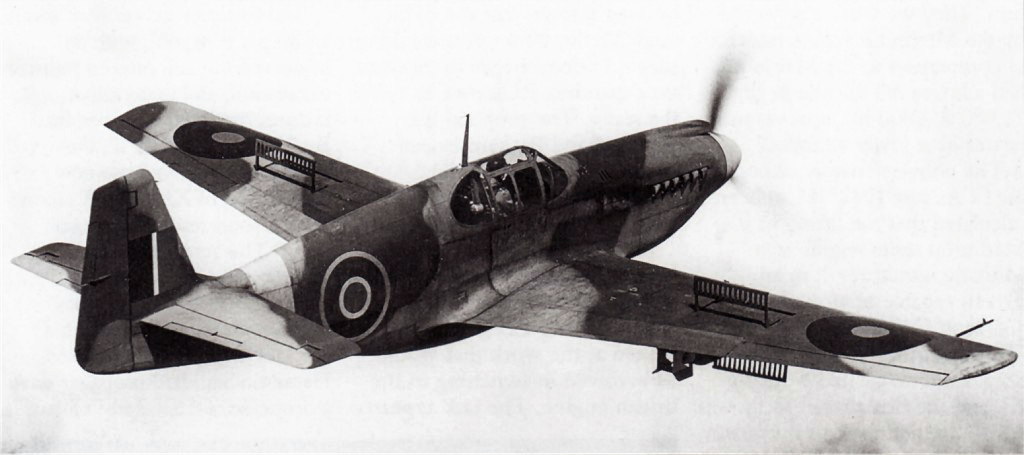
Sole RAF A-36A, EW998, with the slatted dive brakes extended

During the Mustang Mk I's debut, North American Aviation's president Howard "Dutch" Kindelberger pressed the newly renamed US Army Air Forces (USAAF) for a fighter contract for the essentially similar P-51, 93 of which had passed into the USAAF when the Lend-Lease contract with Britain ran out of funds. The Mustang Mk IA/P-51 used four 20 mm Hispano wing cannons in place of the original armament, a combination of four wing-mounted .30 in (7.62 mm) M1919 Browning machine guns and four .50 in (12.7 mm) M2 Browning machine guns. Two were mounted in the wings, while the second pair was mounted in the "chin", or lower engine cowling, and synchronized to fire through the propeller. No funds were available for new fighter contracts in fiscal year 1942, but General Oliver P. Echols and Fighter Project Officer Benjamin S. Kelsey wanted to ensure that the P-51 remained in production.

Since appropriations were not available for an attack aircraft, Echols specified modifications to the P-51 to turn it into a dive bomber. The contract for 500 A-36A aircraft fitted with bomb racks, dive brakes and stronger wing, was signed by Kelsey on 16 April 1942, even before the first flight of the first production P-51 in May 1942. With orders on the books, North American Aviation (NAA) began modifying the P-51 to accept the bomb shackles which had already been tested in a "long-range ferry" program that the RAF had stipulated. Engineering studies totaling 40,000 hours and wind tunnel testing with a 1/8-scale model were completed in June 1942. Using the basic P-51 airframe and Allison engine, structural reinforcing of several high stress areas and "a set of hydraulically operated dive brakes were installed in each main wing plane". Due to the slightly inboard placement of the bomb racks and unique installation of four cast aluminum dive brakes, a redesign of the P-51 wing was required.

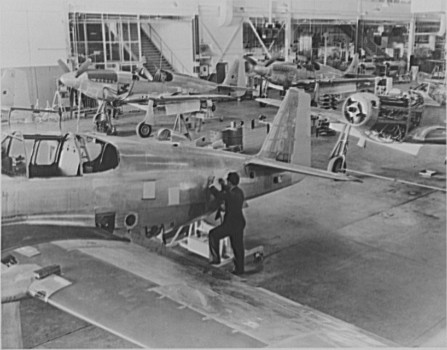
A-36A production line at NAA Inglewood, October 1942.

The first A-36A (42-83663) was rolled out of the NAA Inglewood plant in September 1942, rapidly going through flight testing with the first flight in October, with deliveries commencing soon after of the first production machines. The A-36A continued the use of nose-mounted .50 in (12.7 mm) machine guns along with wing armament of four .50 in (12.7 mm) caliber machine guns. The USAAF envisaged that the dive bomber would operate mainly at altitudes below 12,000 ft (3,700 m) and specified the use of a sea level-rated Allison V-1710-87, driving a 10 ft 9 in (3.28 m)-diameter three bladed Curtiss-Electric propeller and delivering 1,325 hp (988 kW) at 3,000 ft (910 m). The main air scoop inlet was redesigned to become a fixed unit with a larger opening, replacing the earlier scoop which could be lowered into the airstream. The A-36 carburetor air intake was later fitted with a tropical air filter to stop sand and grit being ingested into the engine.

The USAAF later ordered 310 P-51As, that were A-36s without the dive-brakes and nose-mounted weapons, leaving an armament of four wing-mounted .50 in (12.7 mm) Browning machine guns. A 1,200 hp (890 kW) Allison V-1710-81 engine was fitted and used the same radiator and air intake as the A-36A. The P-51A was still fitted with bomb racks that were mainly used to carry drop tanks.

== Operational history ==
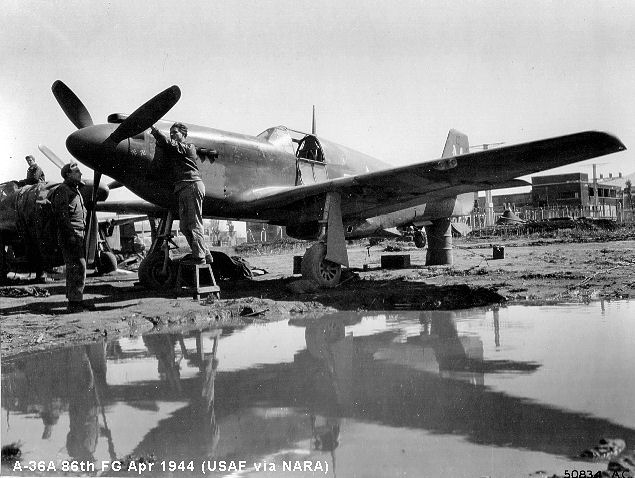
A-36A of the 86th Fighter Bomber Group (Dive) in Italy in 1944.

The A-36A-1-NA "Mustang" joined the 27th Fighter-Bomber Group (27th FBG) composed of four squadrons based at Ras el Ma Airfield in French Morocco in April 1943 during the campaign in North Africa. The 27th had a mixed component of Douglas A-20 Havoc light bombers and A-36As while the second operational unit, the 86th Fighter Bomber Group (Dive) arrived in March 1943 with the first pilots trained and qualified on the A-36A. On 6 June 1943, both of these A-36A units flew combat missions directed against the island of Pantelleria as part of Operation Corkscrew in June 1943 to take the island prior to attack on Sicily. After the surrender of Italian forces on Pantelleria, it became the home base for the two A-36A groups during the Allied invasion of Sicily. The A-36A proved to be a potent weapon: it could be put into a vertical dive at 12,000 ft (3,700 m) with deployed dive brakes, thus limiting the dive speed to 390 mph (630 km/h) (Note: "A36A-1 Flight Manual requires deployment before starting a dive"). Pilots soon recognized that extending the dive brakes after "peel-off" led to some unequal extension of the brakes due to varying hydraulic pressure, setting up an invariable slight roll, which impeded aiming. Proper technique soon cured this anomaly and, subsequently, pilots achieved extremely consistent results. Depending on the target and defenses, the bomb release took place between 2,000 and 4,000 ft (610 and 1,220 m), followed by an immediate sharp "pull up."

Dive brakes in the wings gave the A-36A greater stability in a dive; however, a myth has arisen that they were useless due to malfunctions or because of the danger of deploying them and that they should be wired closed. Capt. Charles E. Dills, 522d Fighter Squadron, 27th FBG, XIIth Air Force emphatically stated in a postwar interview: "I flew the A-36 for 39 of my 94 missions, from 11/43 to 3/44. They were never wired shut in Italy in combat. This 'wired shut' story apparently came from the training group at Harding Field, Baton Rouge, LA."

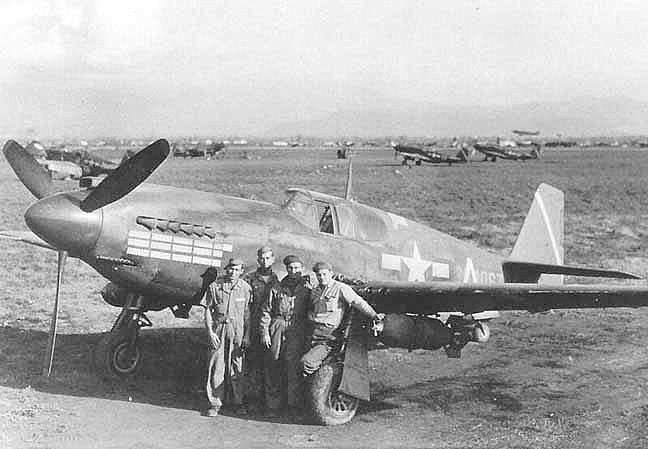
A-36 of the 86th Bombardment Group (Dive), 284067 was lost to flak on 14 January 1944.

However, tactical reconnaissance training with P-51 and A-36 aircraft had delivered some disquieting accident rates. At one time, A-36 training had resulted in the type having "the highest accident rate per hour's flying time" of any USAAF aircraft. The most serious incident involved an A-36A shedding both wings when its pilot tried to pull out from a 450 mph (720 km/h) dive. Combat units flying the A-36A were ordered to restrict their approach to a 70° "glide" attack and refrain from using dive brakes. This order was generally ignored by experienced pilots, but some units did wire dive brakes shut until modifications made to the hydraulic actuators. Nevertheless, the A-36 was used with great success as a dive-bomber, acquiring a reputation for precision, sturdiness and silence.

By late May 1943, 300 A-36As had been deployed to the Mediterranean Theater, with many of the first batch sent to the 27th FBG to re-build the group following losses as well as completing the final transition to an all-A-36A unit. Both groups were actively involved in air support during the Sicilian campaign, becoming especially adept at "mopping up" enemy gun positions and other strong points as the Allies advanced. During this operation, the 27th FBG circulated a petition to adopt the name "Invader" for their rugged little bomber, receiving unofficial recognition of the more fitting name. Despite the name change, most combat reports preferred the name "Mustang" for all of the variants. Author William Hess claims that the Germans gave it a flattering, if fearsome, accolade, calling the A-36As: "screaming helldivers."

Besides dive bombing, the A-36A racked up aerial victories, totaling 84 enemy aircraft downed and creating an "ace", Lieutenant Michael T. Russo from the 27th FBG (ultimately, the only ace using the Allison-engined Mustang). As fighting intensified in all theaters where the A-36A operated, the dive bomber began to suffer an alarming loss rate with 177 falling to enemy action. The main reason for the attrition was the hazardous missions that placed the A-36A "on the deck" facing murderous ground fire. German defenses in southern Italy included placing cables across hill tops to snare the attacking A-36As. Despite establishing a reputation for reliability and performance, the one "Achilles' heel" of the A-36A (and the entire Mustang series) remained the ventral-fuselage location of the radiator/cooling system, leading to many of the losses. By June 1944, A-36As in Europe were replaced by Curtiss P-40s and Republic P-47 Thunderbolts. In the Mediterranean, the A-36A was also used briefly by the Royal Air Force 1437th Strategic Reconnaissance Flight, in Foggia, Italy. The 1437th Flight took the aircraft on loan from the USAAF to replace their Martin Baltimores. These aircraft were painted with RAF roundels and individual aircraft letters and they were also given RAF serial numbers (Note: A-36 serial 42-14807 became HK947/A, 42-83898 became HK4945/B, 42-84018 became HK944/C, 42-83906 became HK955/D, 42-83829 became HK955/D, 42-83829 became HK956/E and 42-84117 became HK946/F) These Royal Air Force had their aircraft chin .50 Browning guns removed.

A-36As also served with the 311th Fighter Bomber Group in the China-Burma-India theater. The 311th had arrived in Dinjan, India by late summer 1943 after being shipped across the Pacific via Australia. Two squadrons were equipped with the A-36A while the third flew P-51As. Tasked with reconnaissance, dive bombing, attack and fighter missions, the A-36A was outclassed by its main opposition, the Nakajima Ki-43 "Oscar." The light and highly agile Japanese fighter could outmaneuver the A-36A at all altitudes but did have some weak points: it was lightly armed and offered little protection for pilot or fuel tanks. However, the A-36A fought at a significant disadvantage, having to carry out long-range missions often at altitudes above The Hump that meant its Allison engine was below peak performance. In a fighter escort mission over Burma, three A-36As were lost without scoring a single victory. The A-36A CBI missions continued throughout 1943–1944 with indifferent results. The A-36A remained in service in small numbers throughout the remaining year of the war, some being retained in the US as training aircraft.

"The type's relatively brief service life should not camouflage the fact that it made a major contribution to the Allied war effort" especially in the Mediterranean and it amounted to the first USAAF combat use of a Mustang variant. The effectiveness of the A-36 as a ground attack aircraft was demonstrated on 5 June 1944. In a well-planned attack on the large, well defended rail depot and ammunition dump at Orte, Italy, Lieutenant Ross C. Watson led a flight of four A-36s through a heavy overcast on the approach to the target. Watson's A-36s scored several hits under intense anti-aircraft fire although his aircraft was damaged by ground fire. Under continuing heavy ground fire, Watson pressed home his attack and destroyed the ammunition dump before making an emergency landing at an advanced Allied airfield.

== Operators ==
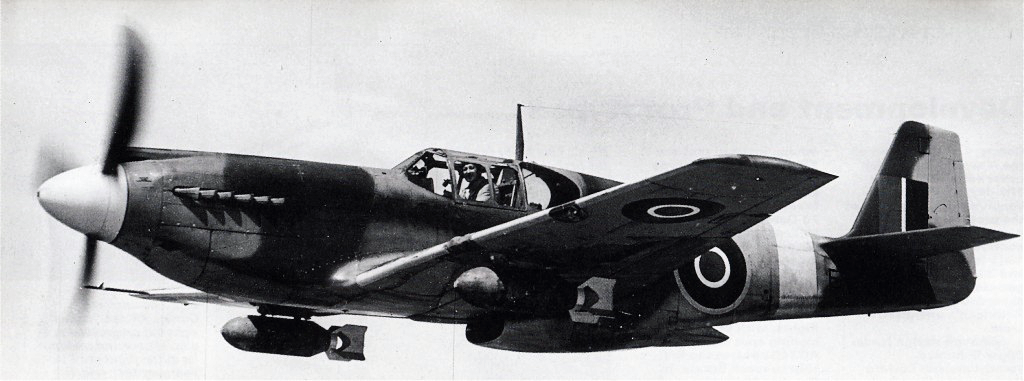
Frontal view of the RAF's A-36A EW998, showing that this aircraft did not have the nose-mounted .50 cal Brownings.

United Kingdom

- Royal Air Force

One A-36A was supplied to the RAF in March 1943 for experimental purposes. Its RAF serial number was EW998. Six others were loaned.
United States

- US Army Air Force
  - 27th Fighter-Bomber Group
  - 86th Fighter-Bomber Group
  - 311th Fighter Bomber Group

== Surviving aircraft ==
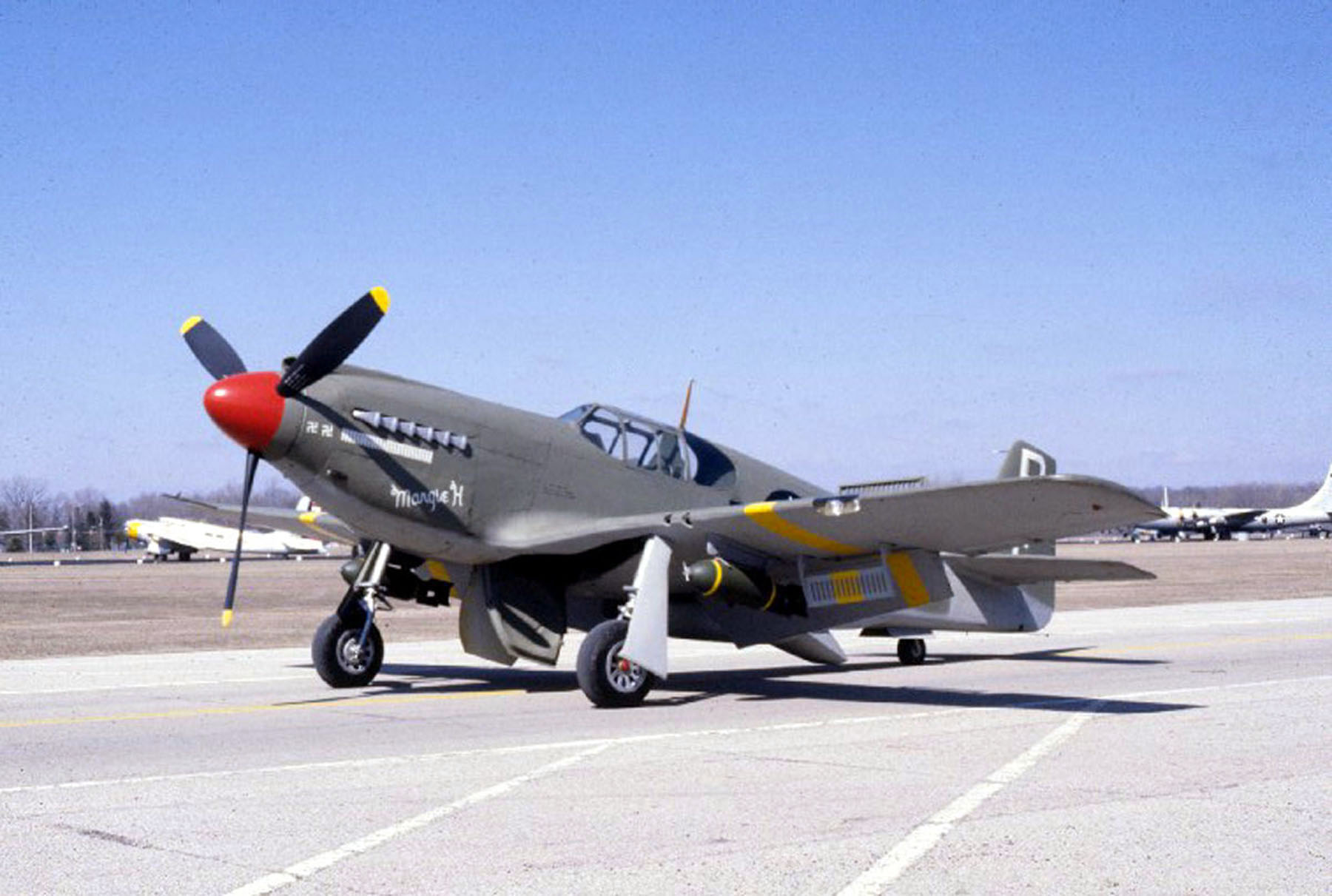
A-36A "Margie H" at the National Museum of the United States Air Force, in the scheme of the A-36A flown by Captain Lawrence Dye of the 16th Fighter-Bomber Squadron in Tunisia, Sicily and Italy.

Compared to the P-51 Mustang, relatively few A-36As survived the war and the subsequent postwar retirement and scrapping of obsolete types. One A-36A, bearing race number #44, owned and flown by Kendall Everson, was entered in the 1947 Kendall Trophy Race. It was able to reach 377.926 mph (608.213 km/h), finishing second to the winning P-51D flown by Steve Beville.

Airworthy

A-36A

- 42-83731 – private owner in Houston, Texas
- 42-83738 Baby Carmen – Collings Foundation in Stow, Massachusetts

On display

A-36A

- 42-83665 Margie H – National Museum of the United States Air Force at Wright-Patterson AFB in Dayton, Ohio. (Note: In 1971, Charles P. Doyle of Rosemount, Minnesota obtained 42-83665, subsequently restored by the 148th Fighter-Interceptor Group of the Minnesota Air National Guard, under the command of Colonel Wayne C. Gatlin.)

== Specifications (A-36A) ==
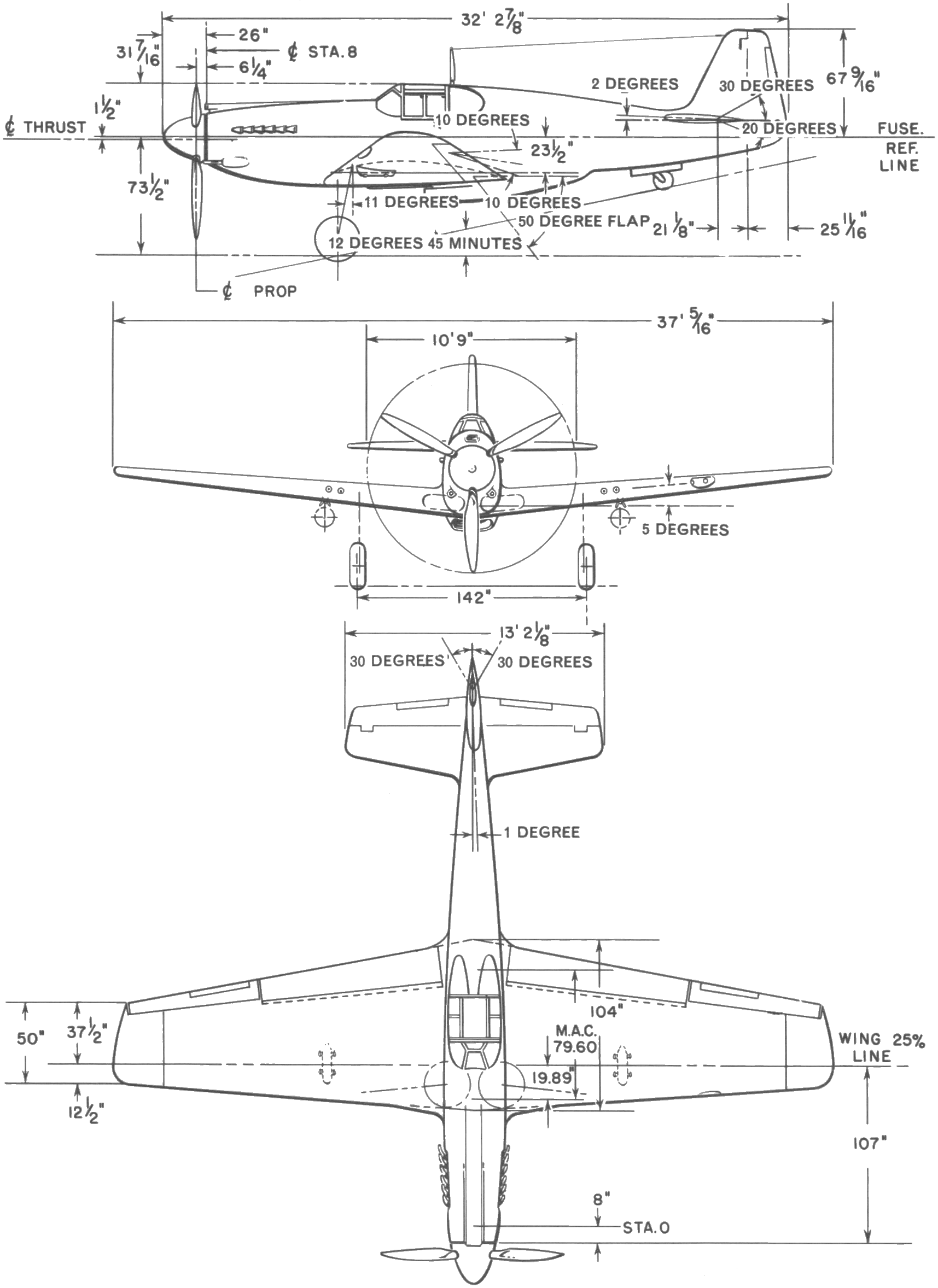
3-view line drawing of the North American A-36A Mustang

Data from National Museum of the United States Air Force

General characteristics

- Crew: 1
- Length: 32 ft 3 in (9.83 m)
- Wingspan: 37 ft 0.25 in (11.28 m)
- Height: 12 ft 2 in (3.71 m)
- Gross weight: 10,000 lb (4,535 kg)
- Powerplant: 1 × Allison V-1710-87 liquid-cooled piston V12 engine, 1,325 hp (988 kW)

Performance

- Maximum speed: 365 mph (590 km/h, 315 kn)
- Cruise speed: 250 mph (400 km/h, 215 kn)
- Range: 550 mi (885 km, 478 nmi)
- Service ceiling: 25,100 ft (7,650 m)

Armament

- Guns: 6× 0.50 in (12.7 mm) AN/M2 Browning machine guns
- Bombs: Up to 1,000 lb (454 kg) of bombs on two underwing hardpoints

== See also ==
Related development

- North American P-51 Mustang
- Piper PA-48 Enforcer, postwar counter-insurgency aircraft

Related lists

- List of aircraft of World War II
- List of military aircraft of the United States
