= 502nd Fighter-Bomber Squadron =

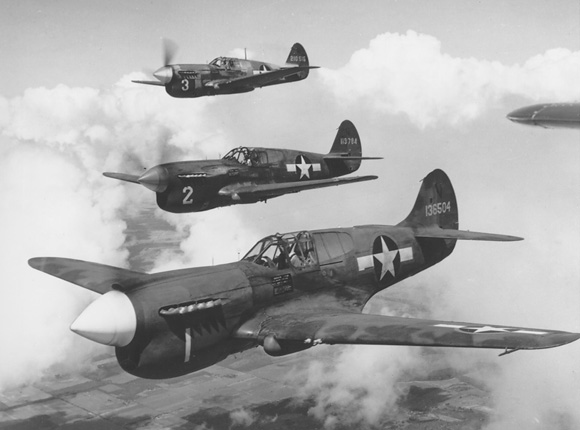
- P-40 Warhawks as flown by the squadron
- Active: 1942–1944
- Country: United States
- Branch: United States Air Force
- Role: Fighter-bomber training

Insignia
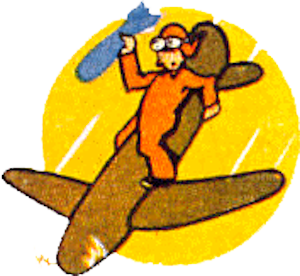
- 502nd Fighter-Bomber Squadron emblem (Note: Approved 10 October 1942. Description: On a disc yellow, a caricatured figure in flight uniform tan, wearing helmet and goggles, astride the fuselage of a dive bomber brown, feet braced against trailing edge of wings, grasping and throwing an aerial bomb blue with right hand; aircraft and figure all diving bendsinisterwise, and emitting speed lines white.)

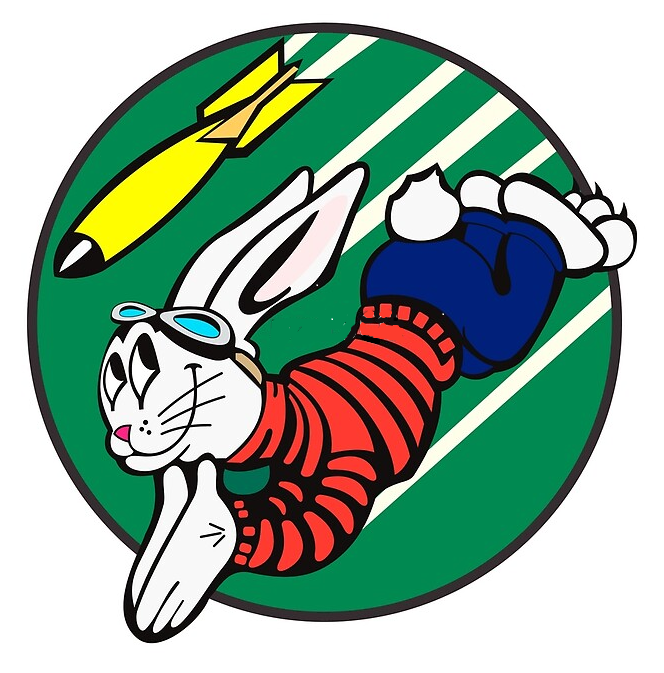
- 308th Bombardment Squadron emblem

The 502nd Fighter-Bomber Squadron is an inactive United States Air Force unit. It was assigned to the 85th Fighter-Bomber Group. It participated with dive bombers in air support maneuvers until 1943, when it became a Replacement Training Unit for fighter-bomber pilots. It was disbanded on 1 May 1944, when the Army Air Forces reorganized its training and support units in the United States.

== History ==
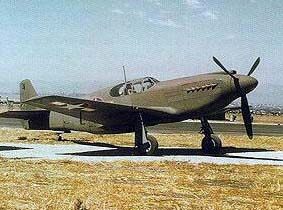
A-36 Apache in as flown by the squadron

The squadron was activated in February 1942 as the 308th Bombardment Squadron at Savannah Army Air Base, Georgia, one of the four squadrons of the 85th Bombardment Group. It moved to Bowman Field, Kentucky, where it was equipped with Vultee V-72 Vengeance (Note: An export version of the A-31, commandeered from a British order.) aircraft and began training for air support missions. However, the Army Air Forces (AAF) determined that the Vengeance was not suited as a dive bomber. In August the squadron moved to Waycross Army Air Field, Georgia, where it began to receive Douglas A-24 Banshees.

In November 1942, the squadron moved to Blythe Army Air Base, California, where it participated in air-ground maneuvers as part of the Desert Training Center, and replaced its Banshees with North American A-36 Apaches in December. In April 1943, it moved to Harding Army Air Field, Louisiana, where it served as a Replacement Training Unit (RTU), flying Bell P-39 Airacobras and Curtiss P-40 Warhawks. RTUs were oversized units that trained individual pilots or aircrews. By early December, it moved to Punta Gorda Army Air Field, Florida, where it concentrated on training with P-40s and was attached to the 337th Fighter Group, which was located at Sarasota Army Air Field, Florida.

However, the AAF found that standard military units like the 502nd, Whose manning was based on relatively inflexible tables of organization, were proving not well adapted to the training mission. Accordingly, it adopted a more functional system in which each base was organized into a separate numbered unit, with flexible manning. The 502nd was disbanded on 1 May 1944, and transferred its personnel and equipment to the 344th AAF Base Unit (Replacement Training Unit, Fighter).

== Lineage ==
- Constituted as the 308th Bombardment Squadron (Light) on 13 January 1942

Activated on 10 February 1942
Redesignated 308th Bombardment Squadron (Dive) on 27 July 1942
Redesignated 502nd Fighter-Bomber Squadron on 10 August 1943
Disbanded on 1 May 1944

=== Assignments ===
- 85th Bombardment Group (later 85th Fighter-Bomber Group), 10 February 1942 – 1 May 1944 (attached to 337th Fighter Group after 3 December 1943)

=== Stations ===
- Army Air Base, Savannah, Georgia, 10 February 1942
- Bowman Field, Kentucky, 16 February 1942
- Hunter Field, Georgia, 9 June 1942
- Waycross Army Air Field, Georgia, 15 August 1942
- Gillespie Field, Tennessee, 3 October 1942
- Blythe Army Air Base, California, 2 November 1942
- Rice Army Air Field, California, 21 January 1943
- Harding Army Air Field, Louisiana, 9 April 1943
- Waycross Army Air Field, Georgia, 26 August 1943
- Punta Gorda Army Air Field, Florida, 3 December 1943 – 1 May 1944

=== Aircraft ===
- Vultee V-72 Vengeance, 1942
- Douglas A-24 Dauntless, 1942–1943
- North American A-36 Apache, 1943
- Bell P-39 Airacobra, 1943–1944
- Curtiss P-40 Warhawk, 1944

=== Campaign ===
Campaign Streamer	Campaign	Dates	Notes
	American Theater without inscription	10 February 1942–1 May 1944	308th Bombardment Squadron (later 502nd Fighter-Bomber Squadron)
