= 501st Fighter-Bomber Squadron =

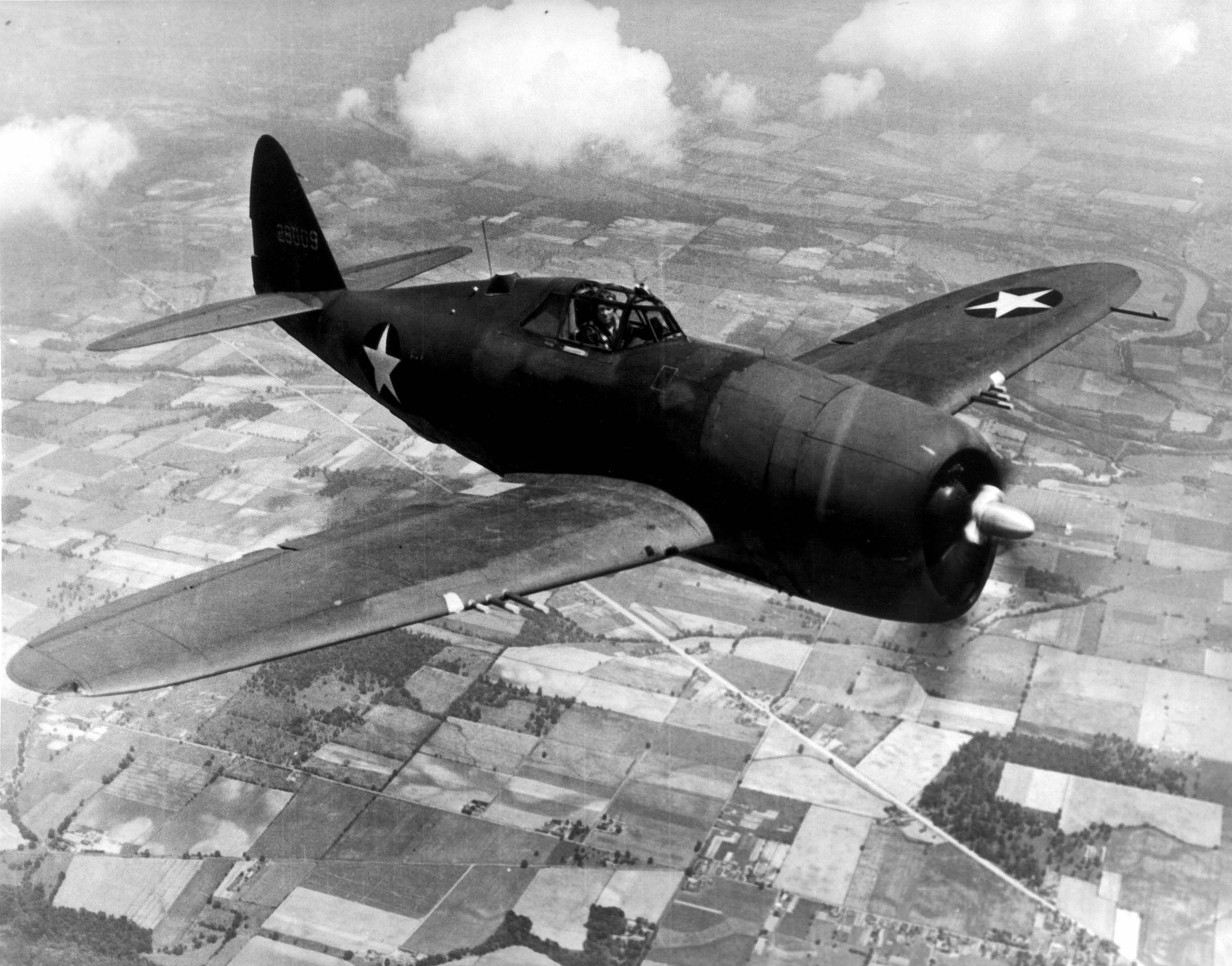
- P-47 Thunderbolt, last plane flown by the 499th
- Active: 1942–1944
- Country: United States
- Branch: United States Air Force
- Role: Fighter-bomber training

Insignia
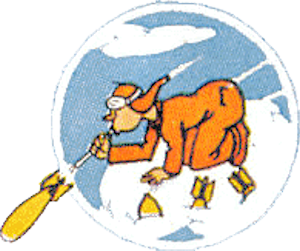
- 501st Fighter-Bomber Squadron emblem (Note: Approved 10 October 1942. Description On a disc light blue, bordure white, a caricatured figure in flight uniform tan, wearing helmet and goggles, kneeling on a large white cloud formation in base, on which rests [sic] three yellow spare bombs, blowing an aerial bomb yellow, extending over and through rim of disc, at an objective by means of a blow gun held to mouth by right hand, speed lines white.)

The 501st Fighter-Bomber Squadron is an inactive United States Air Force unit. It was assigned to the 85th Fighter-Bomber Group. It participated with dive bombers in air support maneuvers until 1943, when it became a Replacement Training Unit for fighter-bomber pilots. It was disbanded on 1 May 1944, when the Army Air Forces reorganized its training and support units in the United States.

== History ==
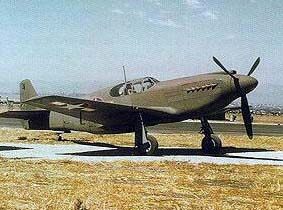
A-36 Apache in as flown by the squadron

The squadron was activated in February 1942 as the 307th Bombardment Squadron at Savannah Army Air Base, Georgia, one of the four squadrons of the 85th Bombardment Group. It moved to Bowman Field, Kentucky, where it was equipped with Vultee V-72 Vengeance (Note: An export version of the A-31, commandeered from a British order.) aircraft and began training for air support missions. However, the Army Air Forces (AAF) determined that the Vengeance was not suited as a dive bomber. In August the squadron moved to Waycross Army Air Field, Georgia, where it began to receive Douglas A-24 Banshees.

In October 1942, the squadron moved to Blythe Army Air Base, California, where it participated in air-ground maneuvers as part of the Desert Training Center, and replaced its Banshees with North American A-36 Apaches in December. In April 1943, it moved to Harding Army Air Field, Louisiana, where it served as a Replacement Training Unit (RTU), flying Bell P-39 Airacobras and Curtiss P-40 Warhawks. RTUs were oversized units that trained individual pilots or aircrews.

However, the AAF found that standard military units like the 501st, Whose manning was based on relatively inflexible tables of organization, were proving not well adapted to the training mission. Accordingly, it adopted a more functional system in which each base was organized into a separate numbered unit, with flexible manning. The 501st was disbanded on 1 May 1944, and transferred its personnel and equipment to the 345th AAF Base Unit (Replacement Training Unit, Fighter).

== Lineage ==
- Constituted as the 307th Bombardment Squadron (Light) on 13 January 1942

Activated on 10 February 1942
Redesignated 307th Bombardment Squadron (Dive) on 27 July 1942
Redesignated 501st Fighter-Bomber Squadron on 10 August 1943
Disbanded on 1 May 1944

=== Assignments ===
- 85th Bombardment Group (later 85th Fighter-Bomber Group), 10 February 1942 – 1 May 1944

=== Stations ===
- Army Air Base, Savannah, Georgia, 10 February 1942
- Bowman Field, Kentucky, 16 February 1942
- Hunter Field, Georgia, 9 June 1942
- Waycross Army Air Field, Georgia, 15 August 1942
- Gillespie Field, Tennessee, 2 October 1942
- Blythe Army Air Base, California, 23 October 1942
- Rice Army Air Field, California, 12 December 1942
- Harding Army Air Field, Louisiana, 9 April 1943
- Waycross Army Air Field, Georgia, 25 September – 1 May 1944

=== Aircraft ===
- Vultee V-72 Vengeance, 1942
- Douglas A-24 Dauntless, 1942–1943
- North American A-36 Apache, 1943
- Bell P-39 Airacobra, 1943–1944
- Curtiss P-40 Warhawk, 1944
- Republic P-47 Thunderbolt

=== Campaign ===
Campaign Streamer	Campaign	Dates	Notes
	American Theater without inscription	10 February 1942–1 May 1944	307th Bombardment Squadron (later 501st Fighter-Bomber Squadron)
