= 500th Fighter-Bomber Squadron =

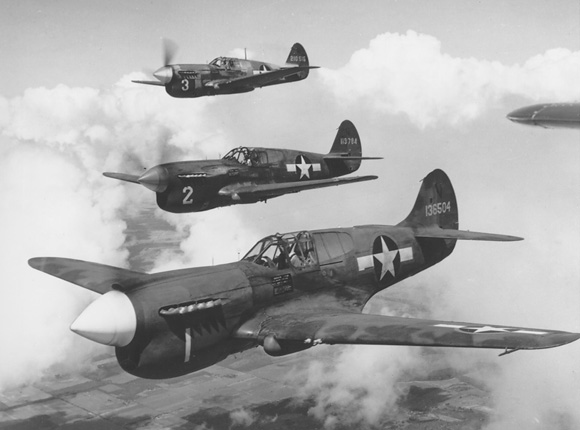
- P-40 Warhawks as flown by the squadron
- Active: 1942–1944
- Country: United States
- Branch: United States Air Force
- Role: Fighter-bomber training

Insignia
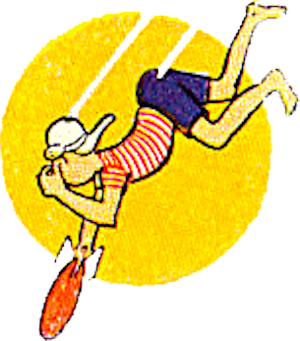
- 500th Fighter-Bomber Squadron emblem (Note: Approved 31 August 1942. Description Over and through a disc yellow, a figure in bathing suit, shirt red and white stripes, pants blue, wearing a white aviator's helmet and goggles, grasping nose in left hand, and an aerial bomb orange, fins white, in the right hand extended forward and down through rim of disc, speed lines white.)

The 500th Fighter-Bomber Squadron is an inactive United States Air Force unit. It was assigned to the 85th Fighter-Bomber Group. It participated with dive bombers in air support maneuvers until 1943, when it became a Replacement Training Unit for fighter-bomber pilots. It was disbanded on 1 May 1944, when the Army Air Forces reorganized its training and support units in the United States.

== History ==
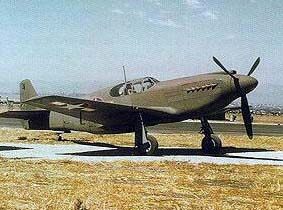
A-36 Apache in as flown by the squadron

The squadron was activated in February 1942 as the 306th Bombardment Squadron at Savannah Army Air Base, Georgia, one of the four squadrons of the 85th Bombardment Group. It moved to Bowman Field, Kentucky, where it was equipped with Vultee V-72 Vengeance (Note: An export version of the A-31, commandeered from a British order.) aircraft and began training for air support missions. However, the Army Air Forces (AAF) determined that the Vengeance was not suited as a dive bomber. In August the squadron moved to Waycross Army Air Field, Georgia, where it began to receive Douglas A-24 Banshees.

In November 1942, the squadron moved to Blythe Army Air Base, California, where it participated in air-ground maneuvers as part of the Desert Training Center, and replaced its Banshees with North American A-36 Apaches in December. In April 1943, it moved to Harding Army Air Field, Louisiana, where it served as a Replacement Training Unit (RTU), flying Bell P-39 Airacobras and Curtiss P-40 Warhawks. RTUs were oversized units that trained individual pilots or aircrews. By the end of the year, it moved to Harris Neck Army Air Field, Georgia, where it concentrated on training with P-40s.

However, the AAF found that standard military units like the 500th, Whose manning was based on relatively inflexible tables of organization, were proving not well adapted to the training mission. Accordingly, it adopted a more functional system in which each base was organized into a separate numbered unit, with flexible manning. The 500th was disbanded on 1 May 1944, and transferred its personnel and equipment to the 346th AAF Base Unit (Replacement Training Unit, Fighter).

== Lineage ==
- Constituted as the 306th Bombardment Squadron (Light) on 13 January 1942

Activated on 10 February 1942
Redesignated 306th Bombardment Squadron (Dive) on 27 July 1942
Redesignated 500th Fighter-Bomber Squadron on 10 August 1943
Disbanded on 1 May 1944

=== Assignments ===
- 85th Bombardment Group (later 85th Fighter-Bomber Group), 10 February 1942 – 1 May 1944

=== Stations ===
- Army Air Base, Savannah, Georgia, 10 February 1942
- Bowman Field, Kentucky, 16 February 1942
- Hunter Field, Georgia, 8 June 1942
- Waycross Army Air Field, Georgia, 15 August 1942
- Gillespie Field, Tennessee, 3 October 1942
- Blythe Army Air Base, California, 2 November 1942
- Rice Army Air Field, California, 11 December 1942
- Harding Army Air Field, Louisiana, 9 April 1943
- Waycross Army Air Field, Georgia, 23 August 1943
- Harris Neck Army Air Field, Georgia, 11 December 1943 – 1 May 1944

=== Aircraft ===
- Vultee V-72 Vengeance, 1942
- Douglas A-24 Dauntless, 1942–1943
- North American A-36 Apache, 1943
- Bell P-39 Airacobra, 1943–1944
- Curtiss P-40 Warhawk, 1944

=== Campaign ===
Campaign Streamer	Campaign	Dates	Notes
	American Theater without inscription	10 February 1942–1 May 1944	306th Bombardment Squadron (later 500th Fighter-Bomber Squadron)
