= Theatre Baton Rouge =

Theatre in Louisiana

Theatre Baton Rouge was a performing arts center in Baton Rouge, Louisiana, that was among the country's oldest community theaters.

The theater launched in 1946 as Baton Rouge Civic Theater and performed at Harding Field through the 1960-61 season. It changed its name to the Baton Rouge Little Theater in 1956 before rebranding to its final name in 2013.

It had a young actors program, as well as regular community theater. The executive director was Sarah Klocke, who was hired in fall 2024.

On March 1, the theater announced it would close on March 23, 2025, at the end of its 79th season citing lingering financial fallout from the COVID-19 pandemic, prior debt from which they were unable to sustainably recover, and an inability to purchase the rights to plays for the 80th season.
