= Waycross–Ware County Airport =

Waycross–Ware County Airport Waycross Army Air Field
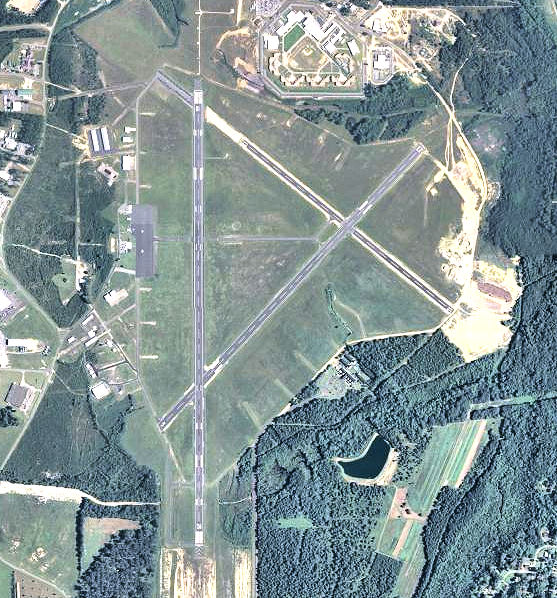
- 2006 USGS airphoto
- IATA: AYS; ICAO: KAYS; FAA LID: AYS; WMO: 72213

Summary
- Airport type: Public
- Owner: City of Waycross & Ware County
- Serves: Waycross, Georgia
- Location: Ware County, near Waycross, Georgia
- Elevation AMSL: 141 ft / 43 m
- Coordinates: 31°14′57″N 082°23′44″W
- Website: warecounty.com/airport.asp

Map

Runways
Direction	Length		Surface
Direction	ft	m	Surface
1/19	5,992	1,826	Asphalt
5/23	5,044	1,537	Asphalt
13/31	3,554	1,083	Asphalt

Statistics (2022)
- Aircraft operations: 18,000
- Based aircraft: 37
- Source: Federal Aviation Administration

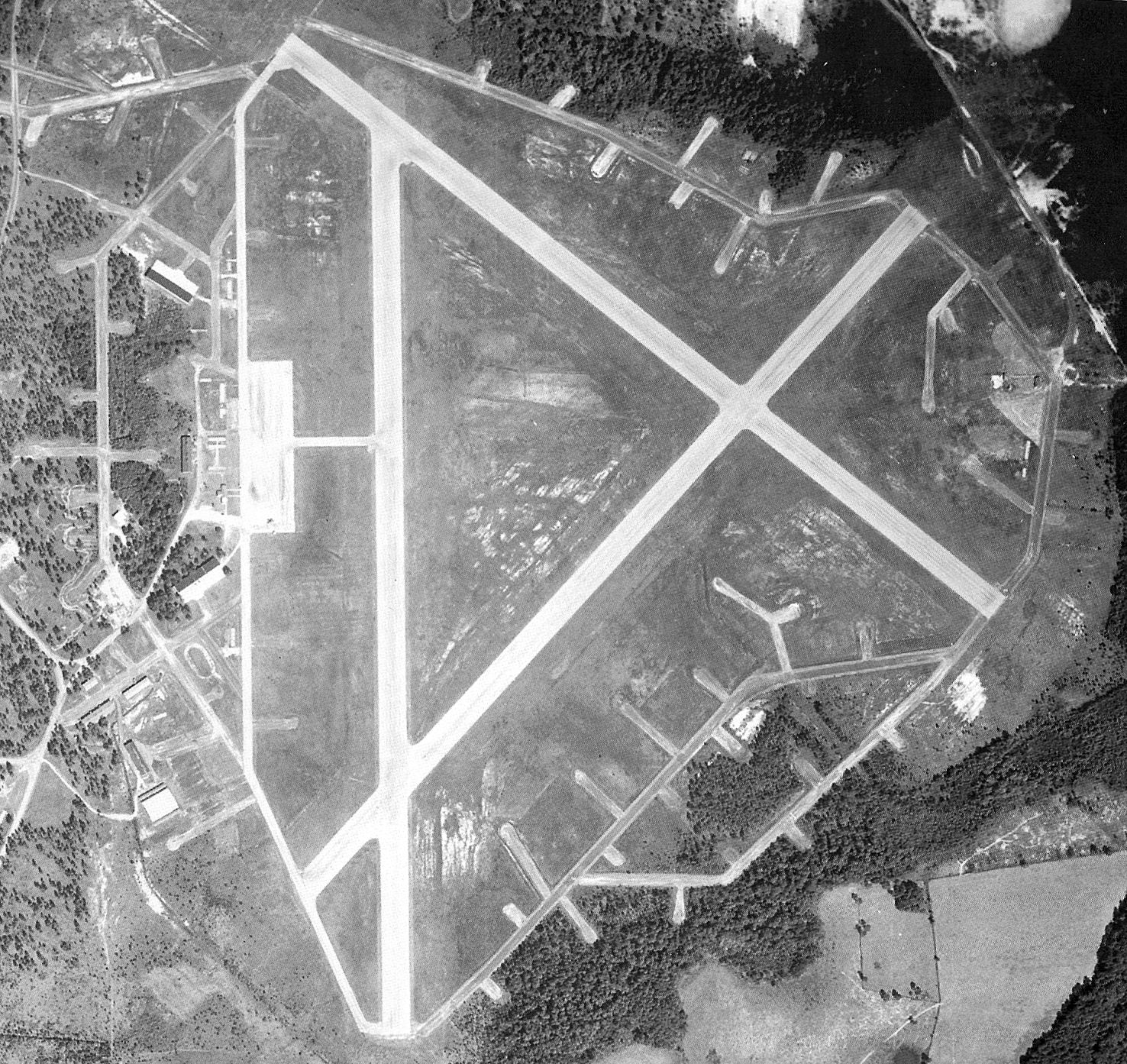
1943 Airphoto

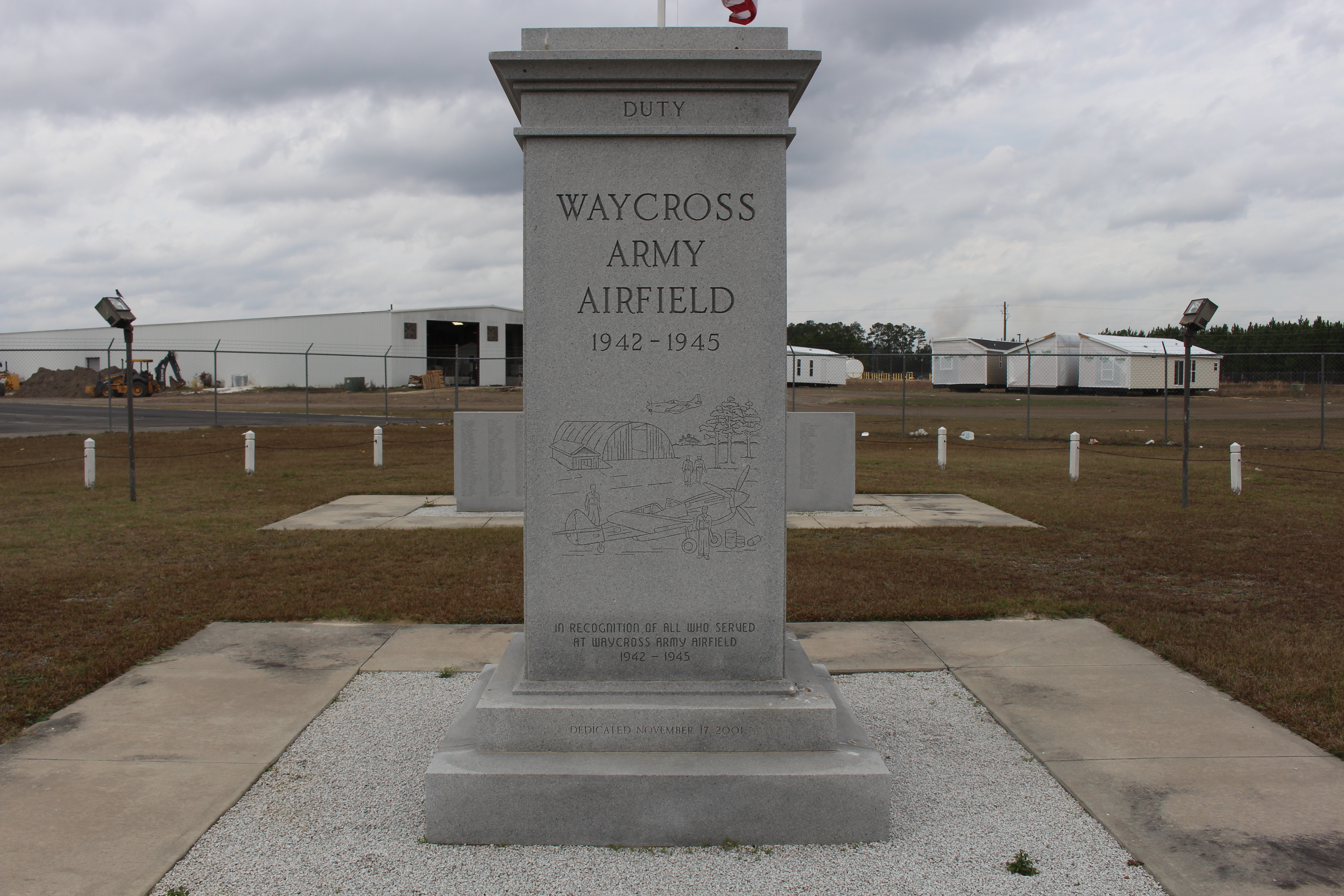
Waycross Army Air Field monument

Waycross–Ware County Airport (IATA: AYS, ICAO: KAYS, FAA LID: AYS) is four miles northwest of Waycross, in Ware County, Georgia. It is owned by the City of Waycross and Ware County.

== Facilities ==
The airport covers 1,051 acres (425 ha) and has three asphalt runways. Runway 1/19 is 5,992 × 100 ft (30 m), with low to high intensity lighting (19 has an ILS approach and 1 has a GPS approach). Runway 5/23 is 5,044 × 100 ft (30 m). Runway 13/31 is 3,554 × 75 ft (23 m).

In the year ending December 21, 2022, the airport had 18,000 aircraft operations, average 49 per day: 98% general aviation and 3% military. 37 aircraft were then based at this airport: 34 single-engine, 2 multi-engine, and 1 jet.

== History ==
In April 1930 Ware County and the City of Waycross established an airport three miles northwest of the city. A 1935 airport guide described the Ware County Airport as a sod airfield, roughly a half mile square, with a hangar, no servicing, and operated by the Department of Commerce.

In 1941 the Civil Aeronautics Authority built two 4,000-ft. asphalt runways under Congress's National Defense Program. With the start of World War II, the Army Air Forces took an interest in the site entering negotiations with Ware County and Waycross to lease 3,000 acres that included the airport. An agreement was reached calling for a lease fee of $1 per year. The Army let the first construction contracts on June 23, 1942. The project specified the lengthening of the two existing run¬ways to 5,000 ft. and adding a third 5,000-ft. runway. Included was a cantonment area to accommodate four tactical squadrons and three squadrons of service troops plus a mobilization type hospital with 118 beds. In August, the Army enlarged the cantonment area by providing adequate housing for two more service squadrons plus a fire station, motor repair building, and two quartermaster warehouses.

The initial construction was completed in December 1942; further construction was finished in February 1943. One of the problems was the poor natural drainage, The area is relatively flat and a series of ditches had to be constructed to carry away water during heavy rainfall. Another problem was the lack of recreational and social activities. This was alleviated with the establishment of a gymnasium, movie theater, enlisted recreation building and officer's club organized during 1943. An athletic area with a volleyball court, badminton coins, softball diamond, and horseshoe court was also completed. The base held dances once a week for the enlisted men.

=== World War II ===
Waycross Army Air Field was initially activated as a sub-base of Hunter Field, Savannah, Georgia. When the 85th Bombardment Group (Dive) and the 41st Service Group arrived at Waycross from Hunter AAF during the second week of August 1942, the base was far from complete so a tent city was utilized. The 85th Bomb Group had been activated at Hunter in February 1942 and initially equipped with the Vultee A-31 Vengeance dive bombers repossessed from British contracts when the war began. The 85th Bombardment Group, consisting of the 305th, 306th, 307th and the 308th Bombardment Squadrons were later re-equipped with the Douglas A-24 Dauntless during 1942. The 85th Group's stay at Waycross was relatively short and at the end of September the Group departed for Gillespie Army Air Field, Tennessee.

The 41st Service Group was the first of several service groups to undergo training at Waycross. The Service Groups were in final phase training prior to staging for overseas duty. The initial lack of facilities at Waycross gave the groups excellent training in providing service to fighter groups that would be very similar to the conditions that would be encountered in overseas duty. The field was constructed without cutting down too many trees resulting in an excellently camouflaged airfield. Many taxiways and hardstands were bordered by trees simulating conditions in a combat area.

During the first week of October 1942, the 311th Bombardment Group (Dive) moved to Waycross from Hunter Field. The 311th Group and its squadrons, the 382nd, 383rd, 384th and the 385th Bombardment Squadrons (Dive), were also initially equipped with the Vultee A-31 before transitioning to the North American A-36 Mustang. At Waycross, the 311th Group conducted replacement pilot training. The 311th temporarily deployed to Fort Bragg during January and February 1943, for maneuvers.

On April 1, 1943, Waycross was made a sub-base of Drew Field, Tampa, Florida. In July 1943, the 311th Bomb Group was re-designated a Fighter-Bomber Group, shipped out to Tenth Air Force in India, and eventually into combat. The next month, the 85th Fighter-Bomber Group and its four squadrons, the 499th, 500th, 501st, and 502nd, returned to Waycross from Harding Field, Baton Rouge, Louisiana. The 85th was assigned the new mission of training replacement pilots. In September, the 499th Fighter-Bomber Squadron moved temporarily to Harris Neck Army Air Field, near the Atlantic coast. The same month, the Army placed Waycross under the jurisdiction of Dale Mabry Field, Tallahassee, Florida. On September 15, 1943, the 30th Service Group arrived increasing the personnel of the field to 4,250. In December 1943, the 499th returned to Waycross, the 500th moved to Harris Neck, and the 502nd transferred to Punta Gorda Army Air Field, Florida. During this time frame, the group's squadrons were operating the Bell P-39 Airacobra. At the end of 1943, the last of six Service Groups departed and the main activity of the base turned to the training of fighter-bomber replacement pilots by the 501st Fighter-Bomber Squadron.

In 1944 the training of replacement fighter-bomber pilots continued. In April, the 841st Anti-Aircraft Artillery Battalion from Fort Stewart trained at the base. On May 1, 1944, the 85th was disbanded and replaced by the 345th AAF Base Unit, known as the Waycross Replacement Training Unit (RTU). During the year, the Curtiss P-40 Warhawk replaced the P-39 as the primary training aircraft. Aerial gunnery took place off the coast 60 miles distant. For air-to¬ground training, the Army established a 32,000-acre range 27 miles SSW at Homerville, Georgia that included skip-bombing, strafing, and rocket targets. The instructors were much more proficient than the students in aerial gunnery, obtaining an average score of 43.0 versus a 21.6 average for the students. It was much closer on air-to-ground with the instructors edging out the students with an average score of 31.4 to 29.89.

Waycross had a contingent of German POWs, used predominately as mechanics. By the end of 1944, AAF training diminished to the point that the Army closed Harris Neck AAF, transferring its personnel and aircraft to Waycross.

Waycross celebrated the arrival of brand new North American P-51 Mustangs in April, 1945. Initially, Waycross operated an equal number of P-40s and P-51s. The only problem encountered with the Mustang was cockpit heat caused by the aircraft's bubble canopy during summer. As a result, the RTU operated the Mustangs above 5,000 ft. using them mainly for air-to-air gunnery. In May, Waycross received one Douglas C-47 Skytrain and one Beech C-45. The C-47 took the base's enlisted men on cross-country liberty flights while the officers had use of the C-45. Liberty flights were flown to Washington, D.C., New York City, Chicago, Pittsburg, and St. Louis and other cities.

By July 1945, Waycross had completed 15 classes of pilots. As training continued to reduce, the Army closed Waycross on October 15, 1945.

=== Waycross–Ware County Airport ===
Eventually the government returned the airport to Ware County and the City of Waycross. Eastern Airlines began scheduled flights in 1948; its last Convair left in 1969. Later, AirSouth served the airport.

No scheduled airline serves Waycross now. A monument that remembers the Army's presence has been erected at the airport's entrance and a display in the terminal building gives a brief history of the AAF at Waycross. A couple of former Army buildings remain.

== See also ==
- Georgia World War II Army Airfields
- List of airports in Georgia (U.S. state)
