= 499th =

499th may refer to:

- 499th Air Refueling Wing, aerial refueling unit located at Westover AFB, Massachusetts
- 499th Bombardment Squadron, inactive United States Air Force unit
- 499th Fighter-Bomber Squadron, inactive United States Air Force unit

== See also ==
- 499 (number)
- 499, the year 499 (CDXCIX) of the Julian calendar
- 499 BC
