= 56th Rescue Squadron =

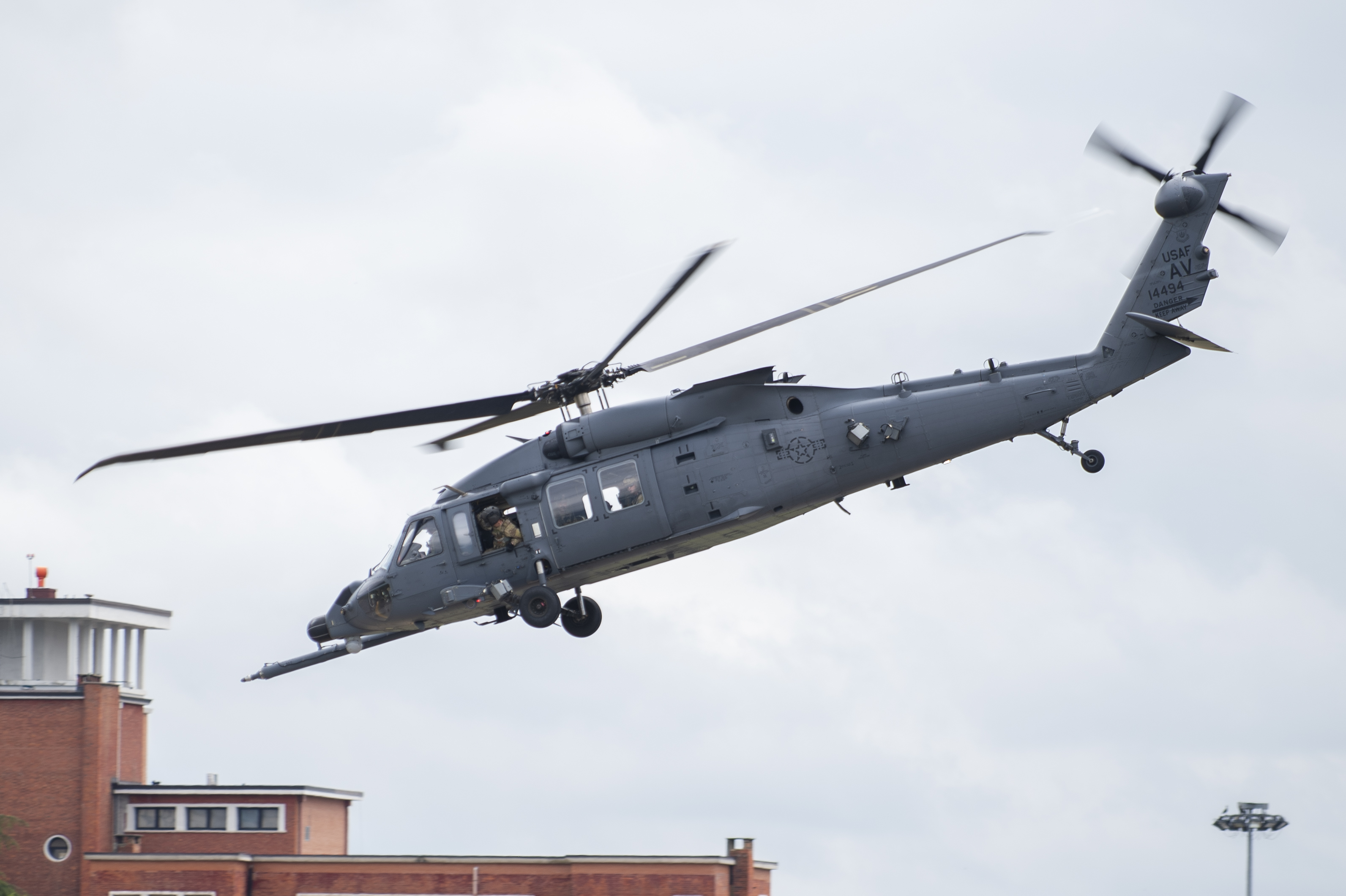
- 56th RQS HH-60W Jolly Green II 19-14494 in flight over Aviano AB, May 2025.
- Active: 1952–1960; 1972–1975; 1988 – present
- Country: United States
- Branch: United States Air Force
- Type: Squadron
- Role: Combat search and rescue
- Part of: 31st Operations Group
- Base: Aviano Air Base, Italy

Insignia
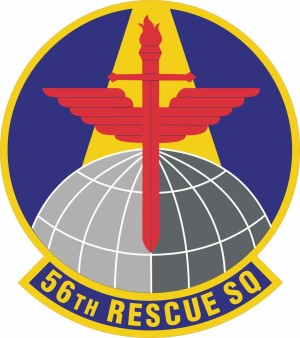
- Squadron emblem
- Tail code: AV

Aircraft flown
- Multirole helicopter: HH-60W Jolly Green II

The 56th Rescue Squadron (56 RQS) is part of the 31st Fighter Wing, Aviano Air Base, Italy, from where it operates Sikorsky HH-60W Jolly Green II helicopters conducting search and rescue missions. The squadron was previously assigned to the 48th Fighter Wing at RAF Lakenheath, United Kingdom, between 2006 and 2018.

== Mission ==
The 56th Rescue Squadron is a combat-ready search and rescue squadron of HH-60W Jolly Green II helicopters capable of executing all-weather search and rescue missions day or night in hostile environments in support of USAFE, USEUCOM, and NATO operations. It employs a state-of-the-art communications and navigation system along with advanced search and rescue equipment. The squadron is capable of deploying to any theater of operations in the world.

== History ==
=== Morocco (1952–1960) ===
The 56th was first activated as the 56th Air Rescue Squadron at Sidi Slimane Air Base, French Morocco, on 14 November 1952. The 56th flew search and rescue, and medical evacuation, in North Africa and southern Europe until its inactivation on 18 March 1960.

=== Thailand (1972–1975) ===
On 1 April 1972, the 39th Aerospace Rescue and Recovery Squadron was inactivated and its aircraft and crews temporarily became part of Detachment 4 of the 3d Aerospace Rescue and Recovery Group at Korat Royal Thai Air Force Base, Thailand. On 8 July 1972, the detachment was replaced by the 56th Aerospace Rescue and Recovery Squadron (56 ARRS). It flew combat missions in Southeast Asia from 10 July 1972 to 15 August 1973, including search and rescue, airborne mission control, and aerial refueling sorties. The squadron continued to perform local search and rescue until February 1975.

On 12 April 1975, the squadron's Lockheed HC-130P Combat Shadows supported Operation Eagle Pull, the evacuation of Phnom Penh, Cambodia.

On 15 October 1975, the squadron was inactivated at Korat and its 4 remaining HC-130Ps joined the 40th Aerospace Rescue and Recovery Squadron.

=== Iceland (1988–2006) ===
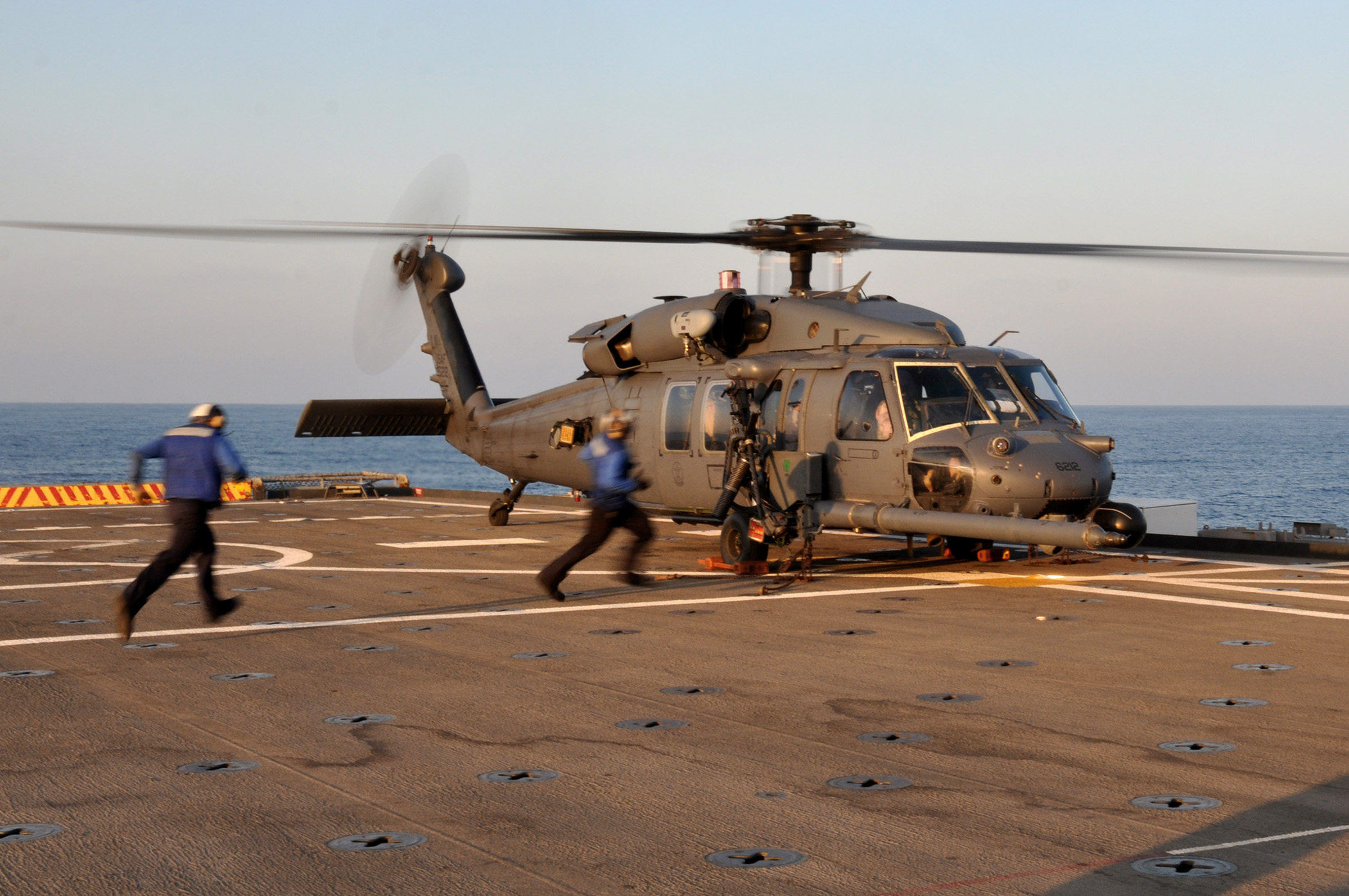
A 56th RQS HH-60G Pave Hawk aboard USS Ponce (LPD-15) during Operation Odyssey Dawn off the Libyan coast, 2011.

The 56 ARRS was reactivated on 1 May 1988 at Naval Air Station Keflavik, Iceland, with the Sikorsky HH-3 Jolly Green Giant, after being redesigned from Detachment 14, 67th ARRS. The 56th became the 56th Air Rescue Squadron on 1 June 1989. The 56th converted to the Sikorsky HH-60G Pave Hawk in 1992, before being redesignated with its current name of 56th Rescue Squadron (56 RQS) on 1 February 1993.

On 10 January 1994, two HH-60G helicopters launched in support of the Iceland Coast Guard to rescue 6 remaining survivors of the MV Godinn that sank off the coast of Vodlavik, Iceland, during heavy seas. Both aircrews received the MacKay Trophy and 8th Air Force Historical Society Ira C. Eaker Outstanding Airmanship Award. Individual crew members received the Cheney Award, Aviator Valor Award and Jabarra Award. The squadron was recognized by the National Lifesaving Association of Iceland.

Between June and July 2003, a detachment of HH-60G Pave Hawks and Pararescuemen extracted U.S. Embassy personnel and American Citizens from the U.S. Embassy in Monrovia, Liberia, during Operation Shining Express.

In March 2006, the U.S. government informed the Icelandic government that American forces would be leaving Iceland by September of that year, with its fighter jet and helicopter presence being redeployed elsewhere. The 56th RQS subsequently began its move to RAF Lakenheath in the United Kingdom in June 2006.

The 56th RQS conducted search and rescue support missions for the Iceland Defense Force up to September 2006, contributing to 958 saves and assists during the 45 year SAR mission in Iceland.

=== United Kingdom (2006–2018) ===
The first two HH-60Gs were delivered to RAF Lakenheath, Suffolk, by Boeing C-17A Globemaster III on 12 and 13 June 2006. The 56th Rescue Squadron was assigned to the 48th Operations Group on 28 June 2006. The 56th Rescue Squadron conducted its first sortie from RAF Lakenheath on 24 July 2006. The 56th RQS full complement of five HH-60Gs was completed by September 2006.

In 2011, a detachment of helicopters from the 56th deployed on board the USS Ponce (LPD-15).

On 7 January 2014, HH-60G 88-26109 'Jolly 22' crashed into the Cley Marshes, Norfolk, after a bird strike. All four crew members were killed in the crash.

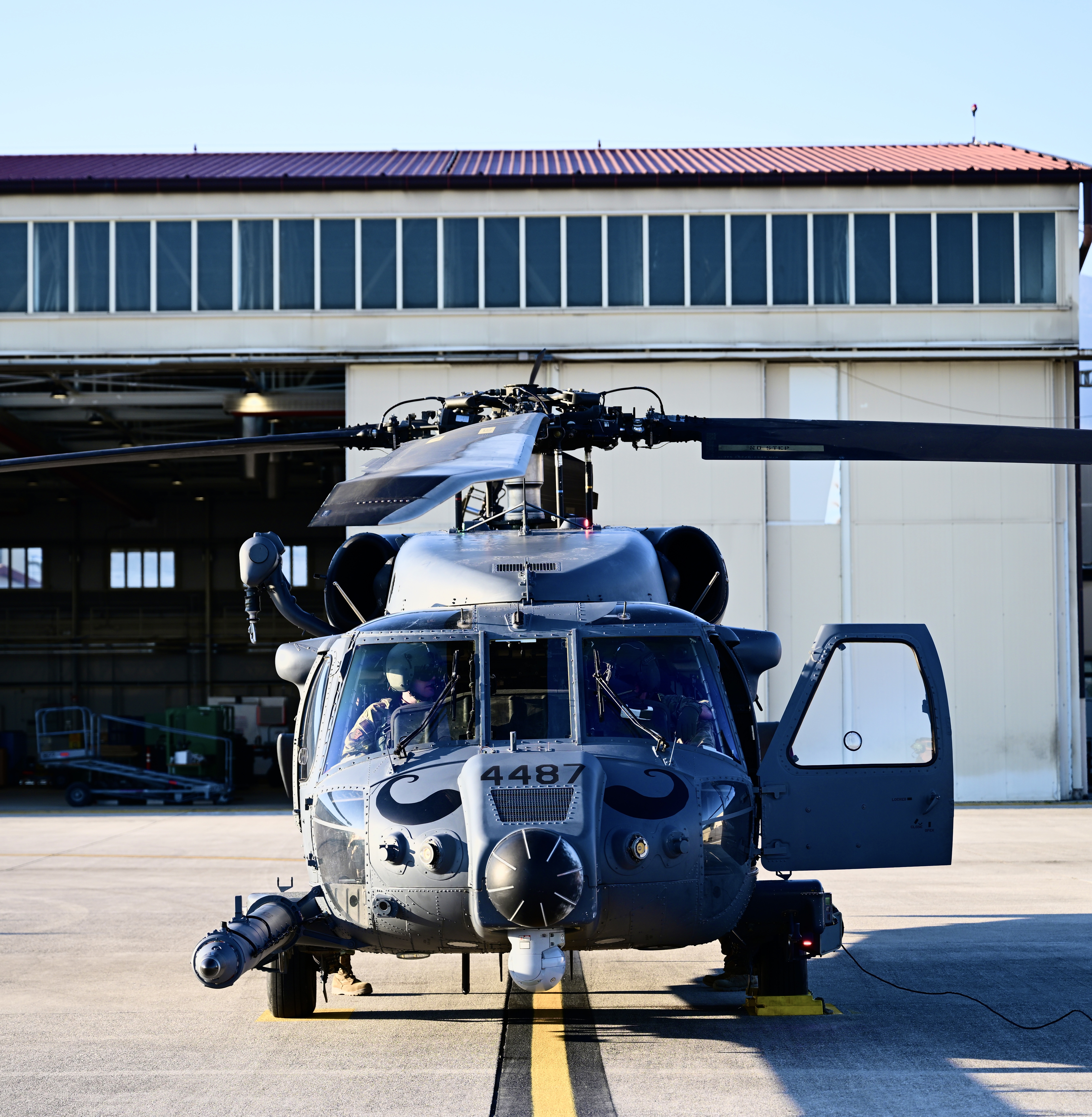
56th RQS HH-60W Jolly Green II 17-14487 prepares to conduct its first flight from Aviano AB, February 2025.

On 18 February 2015, the Pararescuemen of the 56th RQS were split off into their own unit, the 57th Rescue Squadron. In November 2015, it was announced that the 56th and 57th RQS would relocate to Aviano Air Base, Italy.

The 57th RQS conducted their last jump over RAF Lakenheath from a 56th RQS Pave Hawk on 20 April 2018. The last two HH-60Gs departed RAF Lakenheath for Aviano AB on 15 May 2018. The 56th Rescue Squadron had been responsible for approximately 600 saves and assists while based in the United Kingdom.

=== Italy (2018–present) ===
On 8 April 2018, the first HH-60G (91-26353) arrived at its new home at Aviano AB. On 14 June 2018, a ceremony was held to mark the formal realignment of the 56th RQS and 57th RQS from the 48th Fighter Wing to the 31st Fighter Wing.

The 56th RQS retired its first HH-60G (89-26212) on 23 September 2021.

On 13 December 2024, the 56th RQS received its first HH-60W Jolly Green II (19-14494). The squadron's last HH-60G sortie was conducted on 18 December 2024 with a four-ship flight, this also marked the HH-60Gs last active-duty flight. The 56th RQS is expected to complete its conversion to the HH-60W by October 2025. The 56th Rescue Squadron's first sortie with the HH-60W was conducted by 17-14487 on 6 February 2025.

== Lineage ==
- Constituted as the 56th Air Rescue Squadron on 17 October 1952

Activated on 14 November 1952
Discontinued and inactivated on 18 March 1960

- Activated on 8 July 1972

Redesignated 56th Aerospace Rescue and Recovery Squadron on 10 July 1972
Inactivated on 15 October 1975

- Activated on 1 May 1988

Redesignated 56th Air Rescue Squadron on 1 June 1989
Redesignated 56th Rescue Squadron on 1 February 1993.

=== Assignments ===
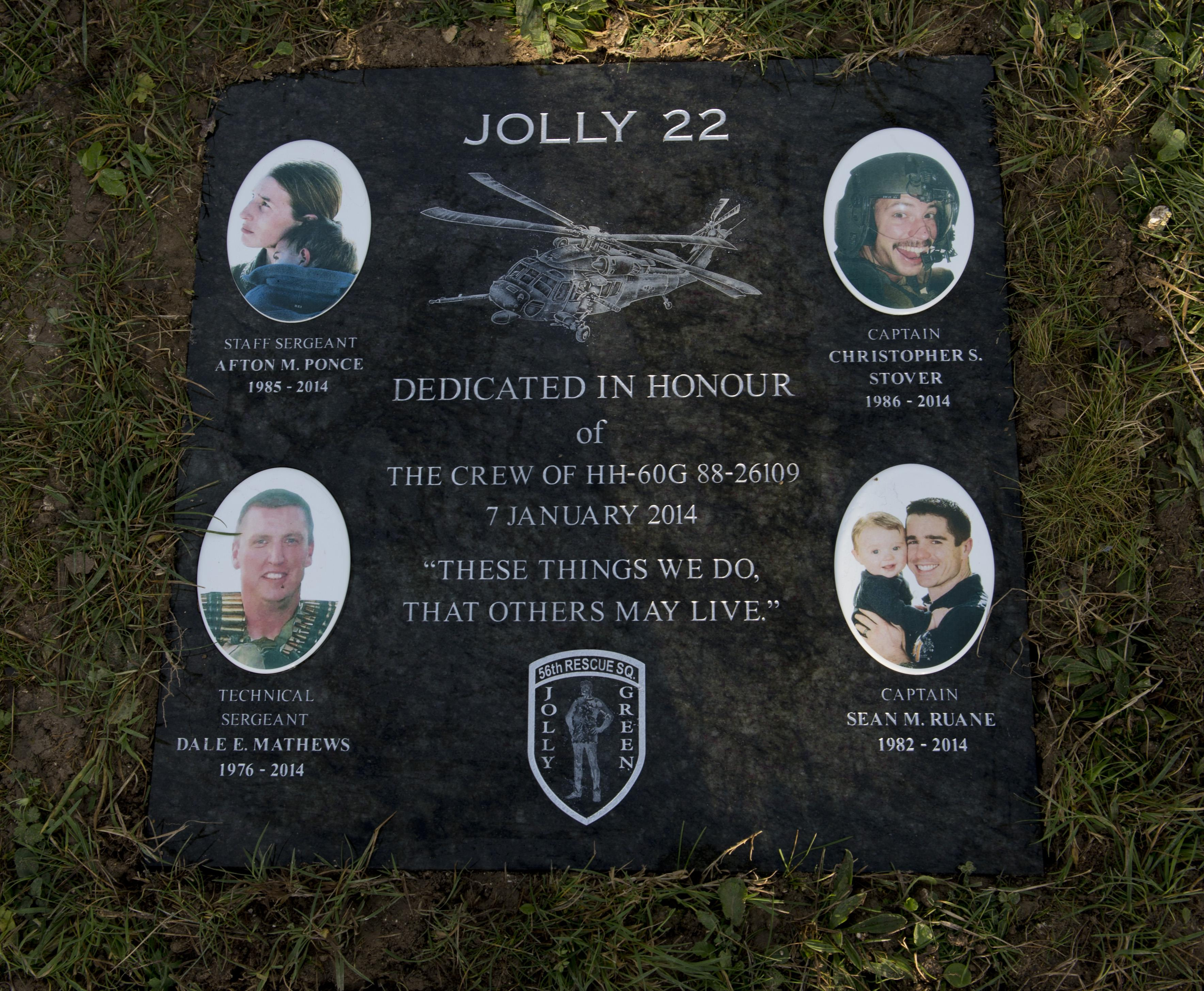
The Jolly 22 memorial stone at the Norfolk Wildlife Trust in Cley next the Sea.

- 7th Air Rescue Group, 14 November 1952 (attached to 5th Air Division until 28 February 1953)
- 12th Air Rescue Group, 8 December 1956
- Air Rescue Service, 18 February 1958 - 18 March 1960 (attached European Rescue Operations Center) (Note: The European Rescue Operations Center was a named activity. Organizationally, it was Detachment 3, 8th Air Rescue Group until 18 March 1959, then Detachment 3, Air Rescue Service. See Robertson, 56 Rescue Squadron Factsheet)
- 3d Aerospace Rescue and Recovery Group, 8 July 1972
- 41st Aerospace Rescue and Recovery Wing (later 41st Rescue and Weather Reconnaissance Wing), 20 Aug 1972-15 Oct 1975 (attached to 3d Aerospace Rescue and Recovery Group)
- 39th Special Operations Wing, 1 May 1988
- 41st Rescue and Weather Reconnaissance Wing, 1 April 1989
- Air Rescue Service, 1 August 1989
- Air Forces Iceland, 1 February 1993
- 35th Operations Group, 31 May 1993
- 85th Operations Group, 1 October 1994
- 85th Group, 1 July 1995
- 48th Operations Group, 28 June 2006 – April 2018
- 31st Operations Group, May 2018 – present

=== Stations ===
- Sidi Slimane Air Base, French Morocco, 14 November 1952 – 18 March 1960
- Korat Royal Thai Air Force Base, Thailand, 8 July 1972 – 15 October 1975
- Naval Air Station Keflavik, Iceland, 1 May 1988 – May 2006
- RAF Lakenheath, United Kingdom, 1 June 2006 – April 2018
- Aviano Air Base, Italy, May 2018 – present

=== Aircraft ===
Aircraft flown include:

- Sikorsky H-5 Dragonfly (1952–1953)
- Grumman SA-16 Albatross (1952–1960)
- Douglas SC-47 Skytrain (1953–1956)
- Sikorsky SH-19 Chickasaw (1953–1960)
- Lockheed HC-130P Combat Shadow (1972–1975)
- Kaman HH-43 Huskie (1972–1975)
- Sikorsky HH-3 Jolly Green Giant (1988–1992)
- Sikorsky HH-60G Pave Hawk (1992–2024)
- Sikorsky HH-60W Jolly Green II (2024–present)

== Awards and decorations ==
- Presidential Unit Citation
- Air Force Outstanding Unit Award
- Republic of Vietnam Gallantry Cross with Palm
