= 3rd Air Support Command =

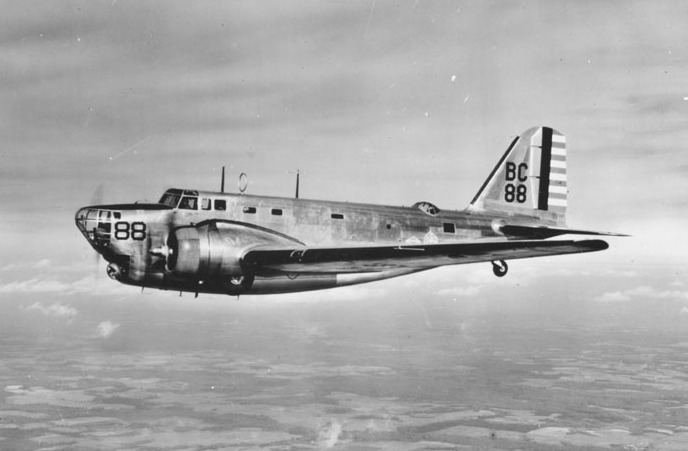
- B-18A Bolo of the command's 3d Bombardment Group
- Active: 1941-1942
- Country: United States
- Branch: United States Army; United States Air Force (Note: In September 1947, when the United States Air Force became an independent service, all former Air Corps units were put under its control, including disbanded units.)
- Role: Command and training of reconnaissance and light bomber forces
- Engagements: Antisubmarine campaign, American Theater

The 3rd Air Support Command was a United States Army Air Forces command, assigned to the 3rd Air Force throughout its existence. It was organized at Army Air Base, Savannah, Georgia. By early 1942, most of its trained personnel had been lost to overseas theaters. It moved to Drew Field, Florida, where it was disbanded on 16 March 1942.

== History ==
General Headquarters Air Force (GHQ AF) reorganized its four regional air districts as Numbered Air Forces in the spring of 1941. By the fall of that year, each of these had organized as a support command and three combat commands.

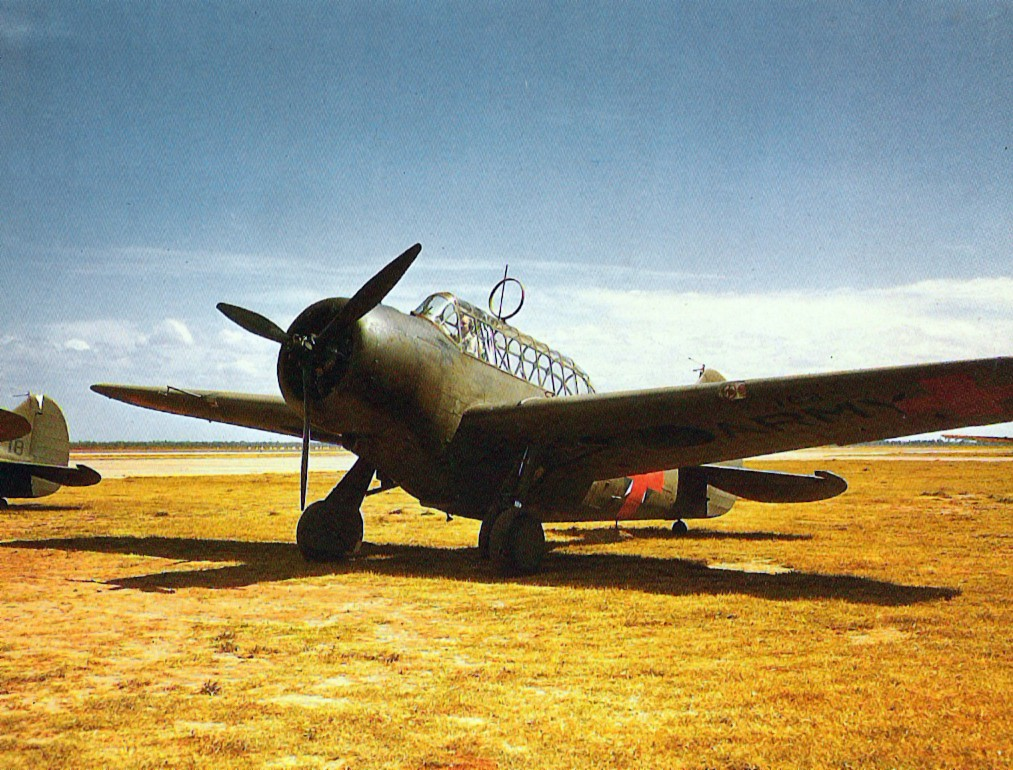
North American O-47B during the 1941 war games

In the summer of 1941 GHQ AF had decided to establish commands to direct its air support mission in each numbered air force, plus one additional command reporting directly to GHQ AF. These commands would be manned from inactivating wings, and would initially control only observation squadrons, which would be transferred from the control of the corps and divisions, although they would remain attached to these ground units. 3rd Air Force organized 3rd Air Support Command at Army Air Base, Savannah, Georgia in September 1941, where it drew its cadre and equipment from the 17th Bombardment Wing, which was simultaneously inactivated. New observation groups were formed and assigned, with cadres drawn from National Guard squadrons that had been mobilized in 1940 and 1941.

The command trained air force organizations for support operations and assisted in training ground forces. During the Carolina Maneuvers of 1941, the command was attached to IV Corps. Unlike the opposing force, the command's headquarters were located about sixty miles distant from that of the ground forces it supported, giving it greater freedom of action. As a result, its forces were used more aggressively and more frequently in an offensive role, than those of the opposing force. After the attack on Pearl Harbor it also conducted antisubmarine patrols.

However, by early 1942, the command's first commander, Asa N. Duncan, like two of the other commanders of air support commands had moved overseas, and similar demands led GHQ AF to believe it had little more than the "remnants" of the command remaining. As a result, it was decided to disband the command. Its headquarters were moved to Drew Field, Florida on 1 March and it was disbanded there on 16 March 1942.

== Lineage ==
- Constituted as the 3rd Air Support Command on 21 August 1941 (Note: Maurer indicates unit was constituted as the "III" Air Support Command. However, the unit was constituted and activated with an arabic number in its name. The use of roman numerals to designate Army Air Forces combat commands did not begin until September 1942. "Air Force Historical Research Agency Organizational Reconds: Types of USAF Organizations". Air Force History Index. 9 January 2008.)

Activated on 1 September 1941
Disbanded on 16 March 1942

=== Assignments ===
- 3rd Air Force, 1 September 1941 – 16 March 1942

=== Components ===
- 3rd Bombardment Group, 1 September – 8 December 1941; 2 January – February 1942
- 27th Bombardment Group, 1 September – c. 20 November 1941.
- 67th Observation Group, 1 September 1941 – [16] March 1942.
- 68th Observation Group, 1 September 1941 – [16] March 1942.
- 85th Bombardment Group, 10 February - 16 March 1942
- 312th Bombardment Group, 15-16 March 1942

=== Stations ===
- Army Air Base, Savannah, Georgia, 1 September 1941
- Drew Field, Florida, 1–16 March 1942

=== Campaigns ===
Campaign Streamer	Campaign	Dates	Notes
	Antisubmarine	7 December 1941 – 16 March 1942	
