= Harris Neck Army Air Field =

Former Army Field

Harris Neck Army Airfield Harris Neck OLF
- McIntosh County, Georgia, USA
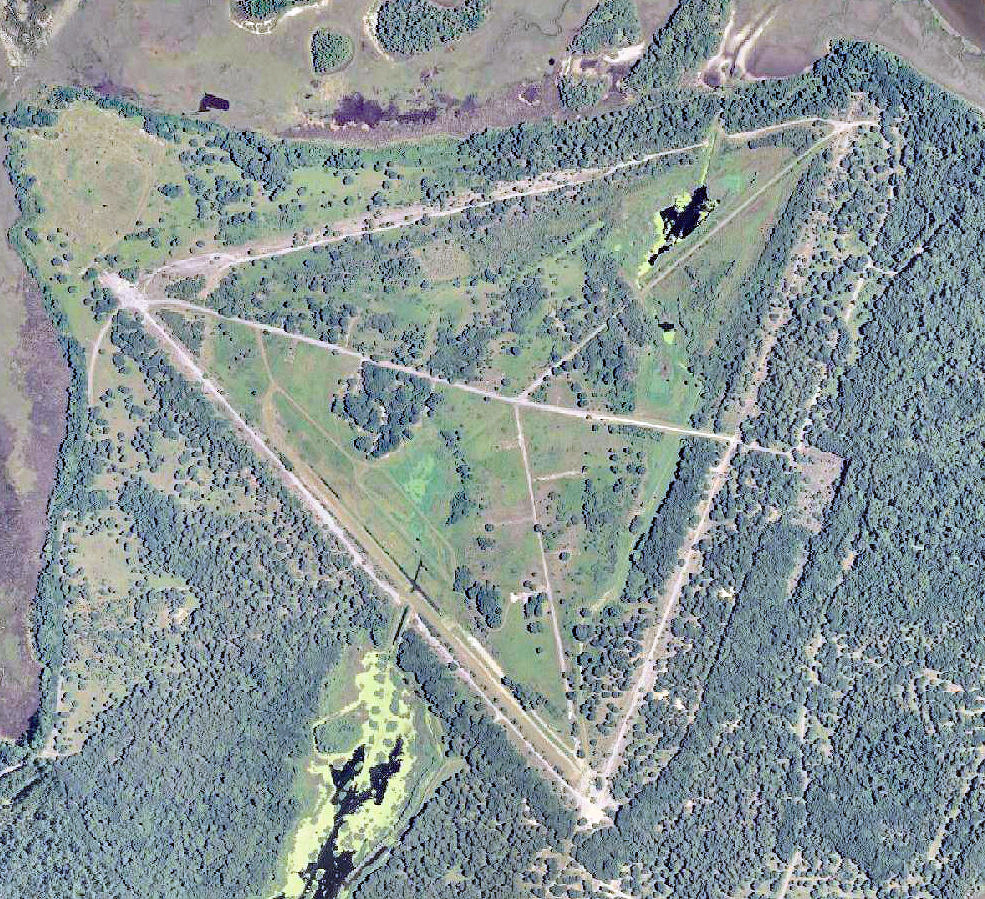
- US Geological Survey aerial photo in 2006

Site information
- Type: Military airfield
- Owner: U.S. Fish & Wildlife Service
- Controlled by: First Air Force
- Condition: Abandoned

Location
- Coordinates: 31°38′14″N 081°16′28″W

Site history
- Built: 1942
- In use: 1942-1944
- Battles/wars: World War II

Garrison information
- Garrison: 85th Fighter-Bomber Group

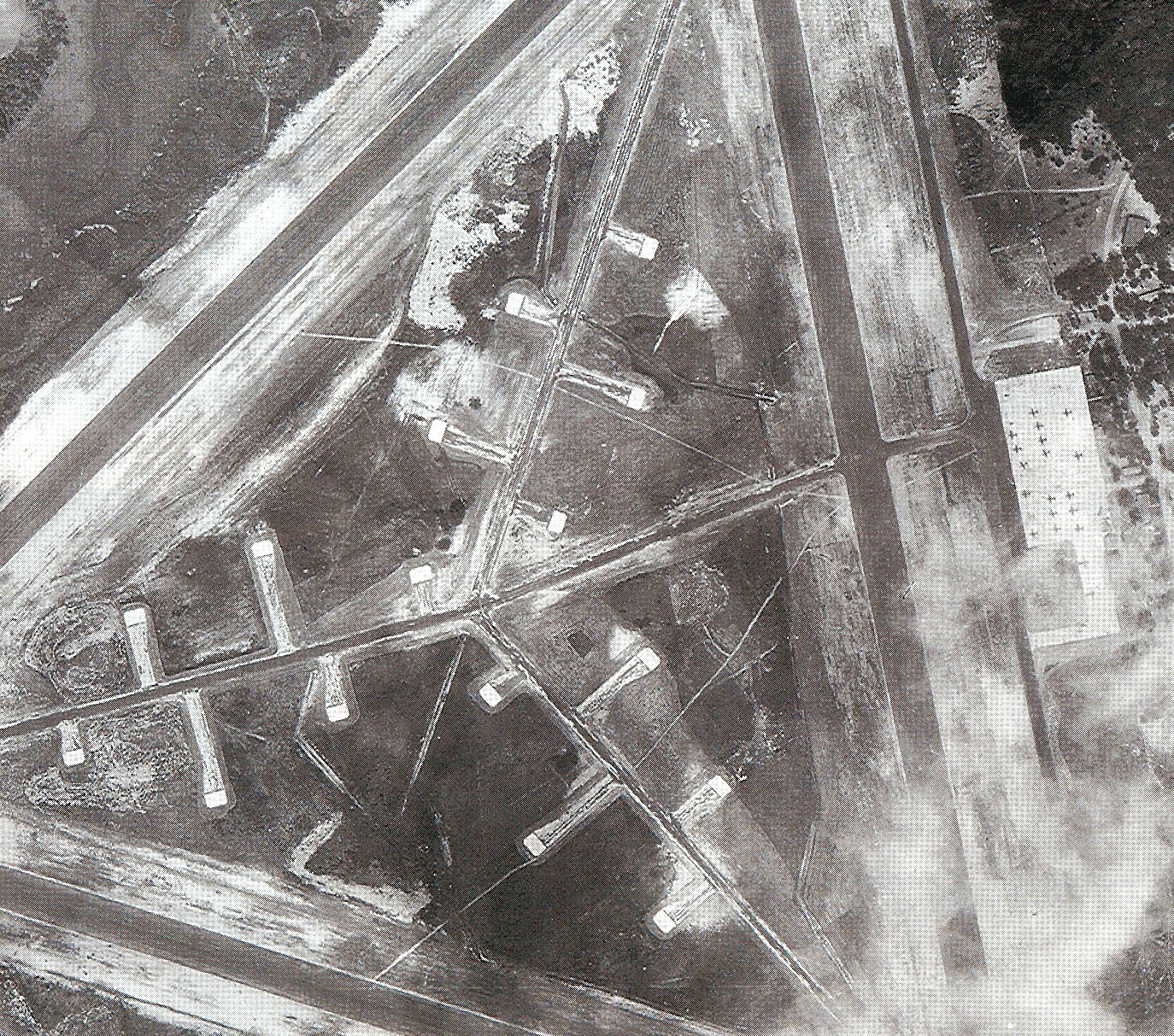
Enhancement of 1944 airphoto of Harris Neck AAF, showing about 20 planes on the parking ramp, one hangar and details of 16 parking hardstands.

Harris Neck Army Airfield is an abandoned military airfield located in what is now the Harris Neck National Wildlife Refuge, McIntosh County, Georgia. It is located north of the intersection of Route 131 and Harris Neck Airport Road, about 30 miles (48 km) southwest of Savannah, Georgia.

== History ==
=== Early years ===
Harris Neck is a coastal peninsula located 30 miles (48 km) south of Savannah, Georgia in McIntosh County. The nearest town is South Newport, six miles (10 km) to the west. Originally named Dickinson's Neck, the peninsula was renamed when William Thomas Harris became the principal land owner in the mid 18th century.

The original Harris Neck airfield was built in 1930 and leased from Courtney Thorpe by the US Dept. of Commerce. It was named "Harris Neck Intermediate Field Site #8", it was an emergency airfield for commercial and airmail planes on the Richmond-Jacksonville air route. The field consisted of a cross-shaped 93-acre (380,000 m^{2}) sod parcel, with two sod runways 2,600' east/west & 2,550' north/south. The emergency field was illuminated and included an 81 foot tall beacon tower, but offered only emergency services to pilots. Harris Neck Site 8 airfield was secured by an army detachment from Hunter airfield in Savannah on Dec. 7, 1941 and closed to the public on 1 January 1942 when the Civil Air Patrol began anti-submarine flights. It was closed for military use in 1943 when the new expanded military airfield was opened a half-mile north. There is no trace of the CAA airfield existence today but its outline by property fencing on the southern boundary.

=== Building begins ===
In mid-1942, the Army Air Force decided to build a base at Harris Neck. The land was expropriated and families were given two weeks to remove themselves. At the time of transfer the black families (who owned 1,102 acres) were given an average of $26.90 per acre and the white families (who owned 1,532 acres) were given an average of $37.31 per acre. This included the 225-acre (0.91 km^{2}) Livingston estate which included the Lorillard mansion and a deep-water dock. Construction was started on 15 July 1942 by the United States Army Air Forces First Air Force. The original plan provided for two runways. The Army's decision to add a third runway required the acquisition of additional land. A detachment of men from the 855th Guard Squadron, stationed at Hunter Army Air Field occupied the Harris Neck facility on 7 December 1942. It was activated on 28 January 1943 as an auxiliary of Dale Mabry Army Airfield in Tallahassee, Florida.

In March 1943, the Army enlarged the project to provide facilities for one dive-bomber squadron of 24 airplanes and an oversized fighter Replacement Training Unit of 36 aircraft. The increase necessitated enlarging the parking apron by 19,000 yd^{2} (16,000 m^{2}). Accommodations were eventually provided for 120 officers and 400 enlisted men. Construction totaled eleven prefabricated buildings and included a 37×99 ft combination theater, a recreation building and chapel, a 20×100 ft combination service club and exchange, and a 20×60 ft office building. The three 5,400-foot (1,600 m) concrete runways were laid out in a triangle that enclosed 15 revetments. Livingston House, a former private residence, served as the officer's club. Since the closest town of any significance, Brunswick was 45 miles (72 km) away, one might surmise that the officer's club must have gotten a lot of use. Motion pictures were shown in the post theater three nights a week.

=== Training, the navy and decay ===
Harris Neck AAF was used primarily for the training of fighter pilots. Numerous units would rotate through for training sessions. It was home to the single-seat Bell P-39 Airacobra, which was replaced during February, 1944, by the Curtiss P-40E Kittyhawk.

Known units assigned to the airfield were:

- 499th Fighter-Bomber Squadron (Fighter, Replacement Training), 20 September-13 December 1943
- 500th Fighter-Bomber Squadron (Fighter, Replacement Training), 13 December 1943-1 May 1944

A typical complement of aircraft consisted of 32 P-40s and five BT-13s. In March 1944, a Noorduyn UC-64, was also assigned to the airfield. Both squadrons were assigned to the 85th Fighter-Bomber Group at Waycross AAF, Georgia.

The 86th FBG was inactivated at Waycross AAF and The 346th Army Air Force Base Unit (Replacement Training Unit, Fighter), was activated on 1 May 1944. Pilots receiving training were normally organized into two classes, (an upper and a lower), of thirty pilots each. Synthetic training devices present included two Link trainers, two Gunairstructors, and one deflection gunnery trainer. The airfield ended its training mission and was assigned to Air Technical Service Command, becoming a sub-base of Statesboro AAF on 31 December 1944.

On 5 January 1945, the airfield was turned over to the United States Navy and remained under its control until 1962. It was listed as Harris Neck OLF and as a sub-base of Glynco NAS in Brunswick, Georgia. It was restricted in its military use, as it was closed to all traffic except on prior approval.

In October 1946, the War Assets Administration deeded the 2,687 acres (10.87 km^{2}) of the Harris Neck airbase to McIntosh County for use as a county airport. The venture was doomed before it even started. To successfully operate an airport, there must be a need. Harris Neck Airfield is in the middle of nowhere. The population of McIntosh County totaled only 5,200 in 1940. During the summer of 1949, several of the former Army buildings were discovered to have been stripped of useful equipment. Local law enforcement made several arrests.

Due to county mismanagement of the land resources, Harris Neck Airport was transferred at some point to the Federal Aviation Administration. The property was then turned over to the US Bureau of Sport Fisheries & Wildlife (forerunner of the USFWS) in 1962. That is presumably when the airfield was closed. The property was then declared a migratory bird refuge.

=== The modern era ===
Today, remnants of cracked and vegetated mile-long asphalt runways, taxiways, munitions bunker and revetments are evidence that the area was once an airfield. The water fountain and pool near Thomas Landing were dependencies of Livingston House, formerly the estate of Pierre Llorilard.

Former residents of the displaced community and their descendants are attempting to work out a compromise with the federal government to allow them to return to their land, without significantly disrupting the wildlife refuge.

== See also ==
- Georgia World War II Army Airfields
