= 85th Fighter Group =

85th Fighter Group

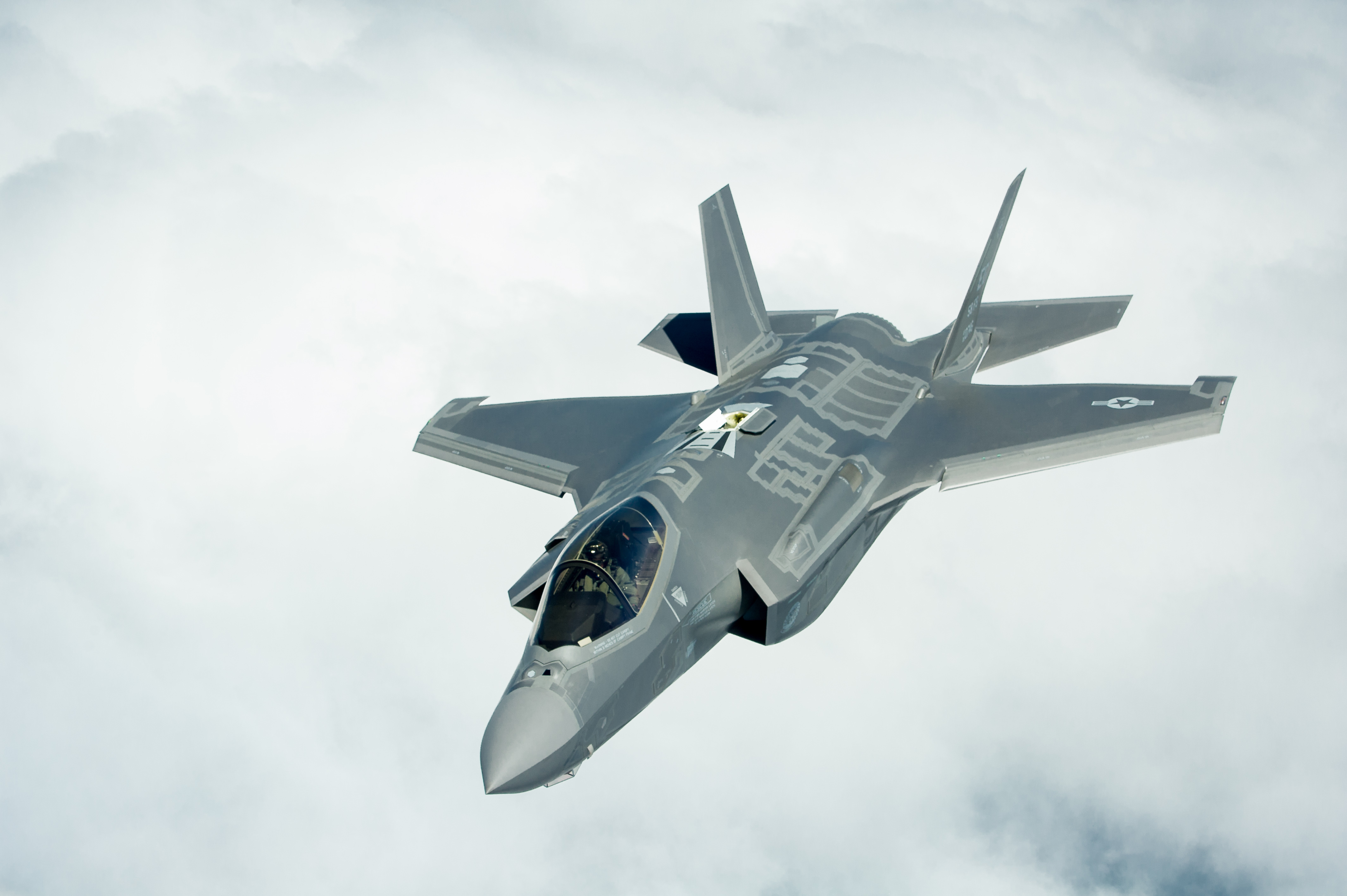
- An F-35A Lightning II preparing for air refueling
- Active: 1942–1944, 1952–1993, 1994–2006; 2024–present
- Country: United States
- Branch: United States Air Force
- Role: Fighter training
- Part of: Air Combat Command
- Garrison/HQ: Ebbing Air National Guard Base
- Motto: Guardians of the North (1955-2006) Coup de Main (French for 'A Sudden (Unexpected) Attack') (1942-1944)
- Decorations: Air Force Outstanding Unit Award; Air Force Organizational Excellence Award

Insignia
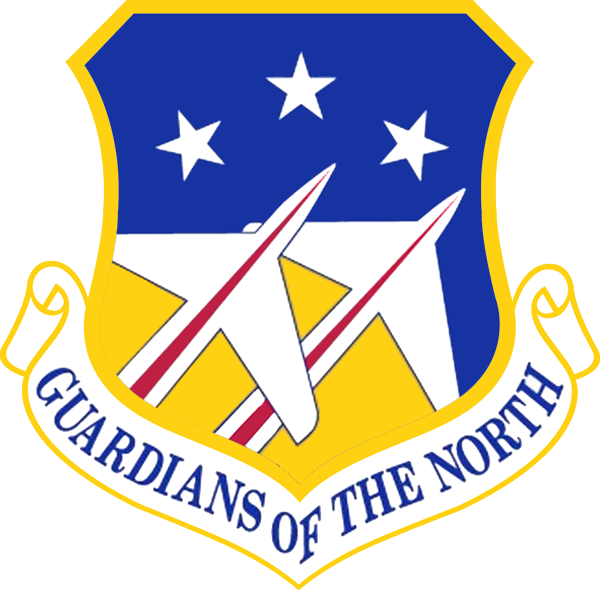
- 85th Group emblem (Note: Approved 13 December 1955, modified 9 October 1968.)

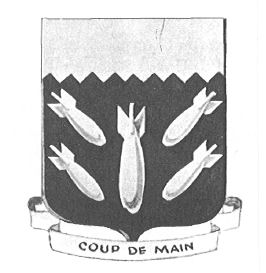
- 85th bombardment Group emblem (Note: Approved 6 November 1942. Description: Azure, five drop bombs or, arranged one large in pale two to dexter bendwise in pale and two to sinister bend sinisterwise in pale, a chief indented of eight points of the last [color mentioned].)

The 85th Fighter Group is an active United States Air Force organization, stationed at Ebbing Air National Guard Base, Arkansas, a geographically separated unit of the 33rd Fighter Wing at Eglin AFB. It serves as a training unit for countries using the Lockheed Martin F-35 Lightning II and the General Dynamics F-16 Fighting Falcon.

The first predecessor of the group was organized in 1942 as the 85th Bombardment Group. It served as a training unit and participated in military exercises until it was disbanded in a general reorganization of Army Air Forces units in the spring of 1944.

The second predecessor of the group was organized in 1952 as the Iceland Air Defense Force. Except for a brief period in the early 1980s, it served as the United States' air defense headquarters in Iceland until inactivating in 2006.

== Mission ==
The group trains pilots from other nations on Lockheed Martin F-35A Lightning II and General Dynamics F-16 Fighting Falcon aircraft under the Foreign Military Sales program.

== History ==
=== World War II ===
The earliest predecessor of the 85th Group was formed during World War II as the 85th Bombardment Group, a dive bomber unit equipped with Vultee V-72 Vengeance single-engine attack aircraft. The group's original squadrons were the 305th, 306th, 307th, and 308th Bombardment Squadrons. It moved to Bowman Field, Kentucky to train for close air support and received its first aircraft there. It converted to Douglas A-24 Banshee dive bombers in August 1942 and was reassigned to Fourth Air Force in California, taking part in training maneuvers at the Desert Training Center with Army ground units programmed for the Operation Torch landings in North Africa. It continued to participate in maneuvers in California during fall and winter of 1942–1943.

The 85th returned to Third Air Force in Louisiana and re-equipped with North American A-36 Apache attack aircraft in early 1943, moving briefly to Kentucky for maneuvers. The group then moved to Georgia with Curtiss P-40 Warhawk single-engine fighter aircraft in early 1944 as a Replacement Training Unit (RTU) for fighter-bomber pilots. RTUs were oversized units designed to train replacement aircrew for assignment overseas. In late 1943, it assumed a split operation as its 500th Fighter-Bomber Squadron (FBS) moved to Harris Neck Army Air Field, Georgia and its 502d FBS moved to Punta Gorda Army Air Field, Florida, while the group and remaining squadrons remained at Waycross Army Air Field. It received a few Republic P-47 Thunderbolts in March 1944. It served as a RTU until it disbanded in early in 1944, when like most RTUs and Operational Training Units its personnel, equipment, and training activities at Waycross were handed over to the 345th AAF Base Unit (Replacement Training Unit, Fighter). Those at Punta Gorda became the duty of the 344th AAF Base Unit (Replacement Training Unit, Fighter) and at Harris Neck of the 346th AAF Base Unit (Replacement Training Unit, Fighter). This reorganization occurred because the AAF found that standard military units, based on relatively inflexible tables of organization were proving less well adapted to the mission. Accordingly, a more functional system was adopted in which each base was organized into a separate numbered unit.

=== Cold War ===
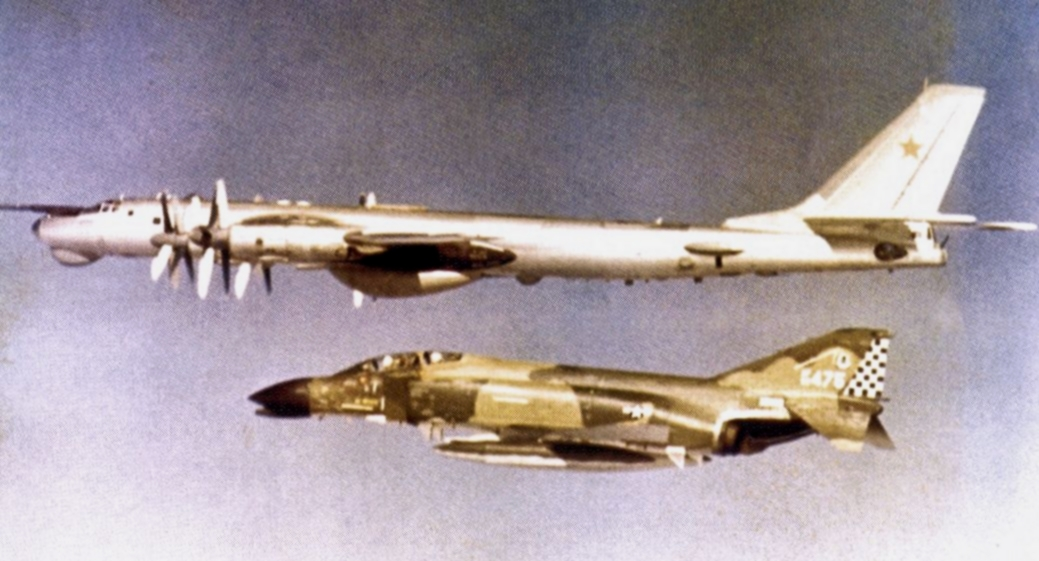
57th Fighter Interceptor Squadron F-4C Phantom intercepting a Tu-95R "Bear B" bomber

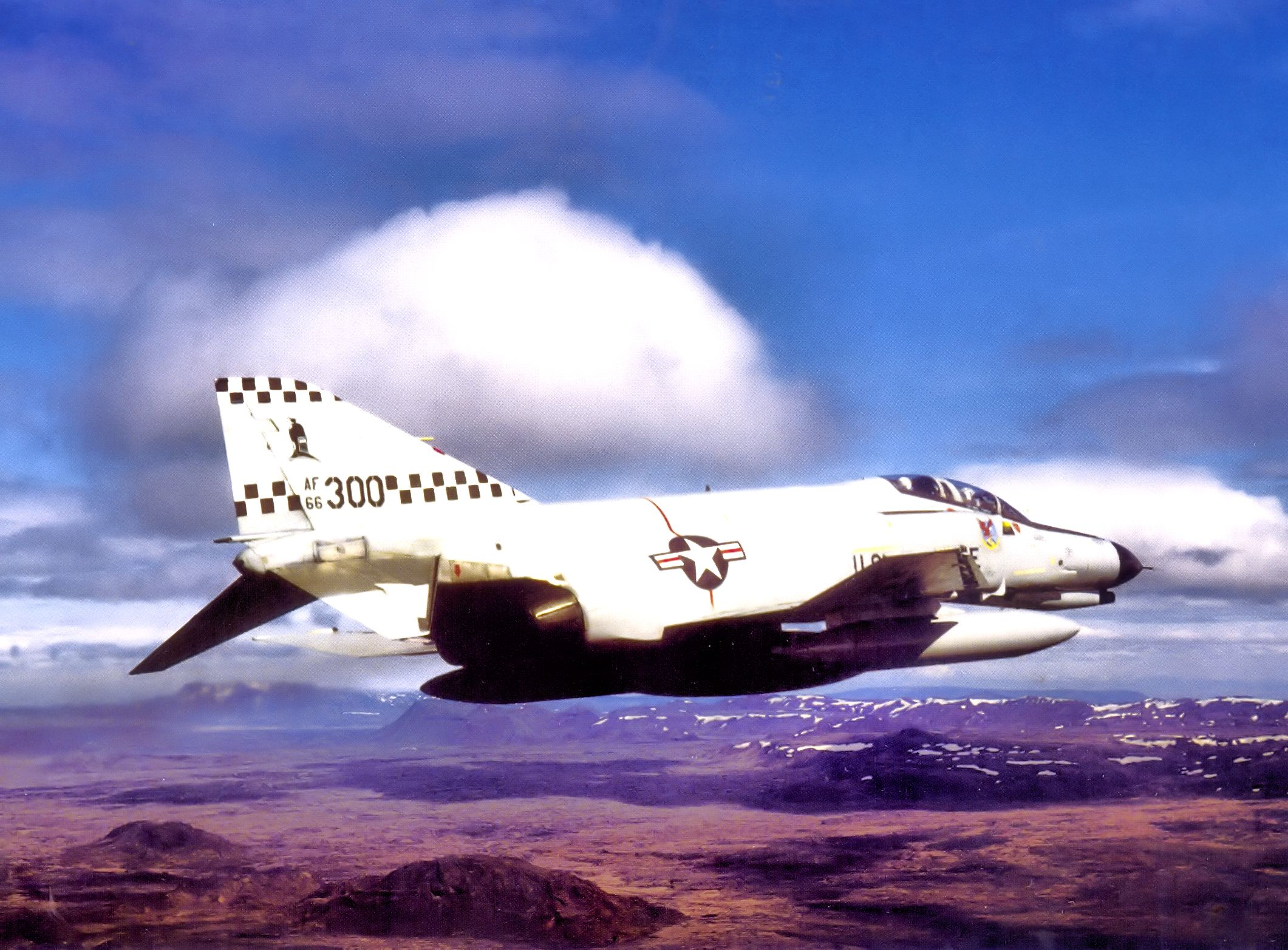
57th Fighter Interceptor Squadron McDonnell F-4E Phantom

The second predecessor of the 85th Group was the Iceland Air Defence Force, which replaced the Iceland Base Command, which had been the headquarters for Army (and later Air Force) units stationed in Iceland since 1942 and was assigned to Military Air Transport Service (MATS). Between 1952 and 1961, provided air defense for Iceland, operated Keflavik Airport, and furnished base support for all Department of Defense activities in Iceland. Fighters assigned to the unit routinely intercepted Soviet Naval Aviation aircraft flying in the Iceland area. It performed its defense mission under North Atlantic Treaty Organization (NATO) as the Air Force component of NATO's Iceland Defense Force. It was supervised on the U.S. side by United States Atlantic Command, later United States Joint Forces Command. Keflavik Airport was transferred to the United States Navy on 30 June 1961, along with base support activities.

Air Forces Iceland continued the air defense mission of Iceland as a tenant organization after the Keflavik airfield became Naval Air Station Keflavik. it was transferred from MATS to Air Defense Command in 1962; Tactical Air Command in 1978 and Air Combat Command in 1992 until it was inactivated in 1993 and replaced by the 35th Wing. In 1994, it was consolidated with the 85th Tactical Fighter Training Wing and activated to replace the 35th Wing to serve again as the headquarters for Air Force units in Iceland, as the 85th Wing. It assumed the operational management of fighter and tanker aircraft deployed to Iceland to protect the nation's airspace. It defended U.S. national interests in the North Atlantic. In 2003, its 56th Rescue Squadron deployed to Liberia as part of Joint Task Force Liberia. It provided a U.S. presence over the capital of Monrovia towards the end of the Second Liberian Civil War and saved lives by extracting people from the United States Embassy in Monrovia.

Reactivated in 1952, the 85th Group was an independent group comprising seven squadrons and 13 staff agencies, with more than 1300 people assigned. Operationally, the group was assigned to the Iceland Defense Force as part of Island Command Iceland.

As the "Guardians of the North," the 85th Group was responsible for deterring aggression in the North Atlantic, protecting Iceland's airspace. This was accomplished through surveillance, air superiority and the use of rescue assets. The 85th Group was responsible for deterring aggression in the North Atlantic and protecting Iceland's airspace. It also supported contingency operations through surveillance, air superiority and rescue forces.

Air Force reductions and a new agreement with the Government of Iceland continued to affect Keflavik organizations. On 1 March 1995, the 57th Fighter Squadron was inactivated and the interceptor force was replaced by Regular Air Force and Air National Guard F-15 Eagle fighter aircraft rotating every 90 days to Iceland. The 85th Wing was reduced to a Group level in 1995 and supported rotational deployments. In 2002 jurisdiction of Air Force units in Iceland was transferred to the United States Air Forces in Europe.

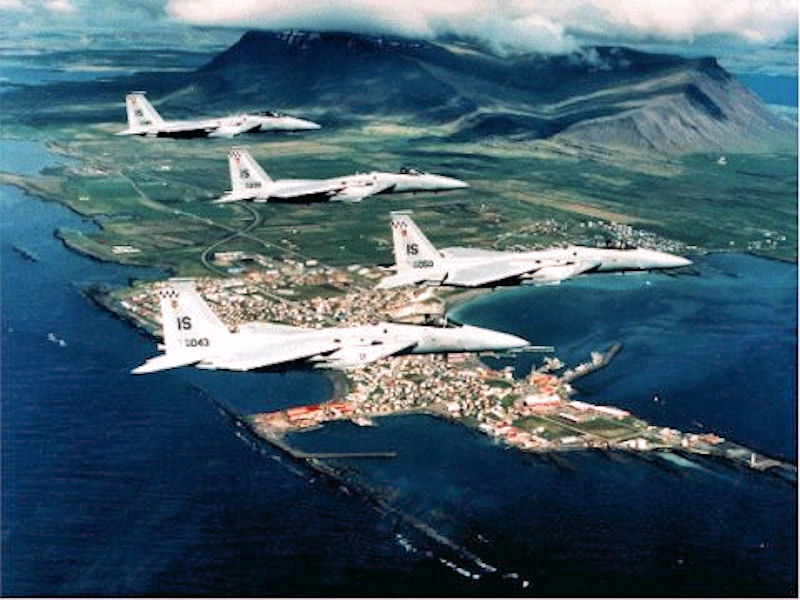
57th Fighter-Interceptor Squadron F-15 Eagles over Iceland 1986

The 85th Group continued to support rotational deployments until it was inactivated on 28 June 2006, as a result of the Air Force reduction in forces in Iceland. All rotational fighters left and the 56th Rescue Squadron ceased operation at the end of the fiscal year.

=== Foreign pilot training ===
The group was redesignated the 85th Fighter Group and activated at Ebbing Air National Guard Base, Arkansas on 2 July 2024, drawing its resources from Detachment 1, 33rd Fighter Wing, which was discontinued. Detachment 1 had been established in 2023, when Ebbing was selected as the site for Foreign Military Sales associated training on the F-35 Lightning II and F-16 Fighting Falcon. Its initial mission was to establish the tasks required to prepare for flight operations. In May 2025, the group reached initial operational capability, graduating its first class, pilots from the Polish Air Force.

== Lineage ==
85th Fighter-Bomber Group

- Constituted as the 85th Bombardment Group (Light) on 13 January 1942

Activated on 10 February 1942
Redesignated 85th Bombardment Group (Dive) on 27 July 1942
Redesignated 85th Fighter-Bomber Group on 10 August 1943
Disbanded on 1 May 1944
Reconstituted on 31 July 1985 and redesignated 85th Tactical Fighter Training Wing (not active)
Consolidated with Air Forces Iceland on 29 September 1994 as the 85th Wing

Air Forces Iceland

- Designated as the Iceland Air Defense Force and organized on 1 April 1952

Redesignated Air Forces Iceland on 1 January 1960
Inactivated on 31 May 1993
Consolidated with the 85th Tactical Fighter Training Wing on 29 September 1994 as the 85th Wing
Activated on 1 October 1994
Redesignated 85th Group on 1 July 1995
Inactivated on 28 June 2006

- Redesignated 85th Fighter Group on 18 May 2024

Activated on 2 July 2024

=== Assignments ===
- 3d Air Support Command, 10 February 1942
- 3d Bomber Command, 16 March 1942 (Note: Robertson shows this "III" Bomber Command. However, at the time this and the following commands had an arabic number in their names. The use of roman numerals to designate Army Air Forces combat commands did not begin until September 1942."Air Force Historical Research Agency Organizational Reconds: Types of USAF Organizations". Air Force History Index. 9 January 2008.)
- 12th Bomber Command, 2 May 1942
- 3d Bomber Command, 8 May 1942
- 3rd Ground Air Support Command (later III Ground Air Support Command, III Air Support Command), 10 August 1942
- IV Air Support Command, 2 November 1942
- Desert Training Center, 21 January 1943
- III Air Support Command, 8 April 1943
- 23d Bombardment Training Wing, 10 April 1943
- III Fighter Command, 6 August 1943 – 1 May 1944
- Military Air Transport Service, 1 April 1952
- 64th Air Division, 1 July 1962
- 26th Air Division, 1 July 1963
- Goose Air Defense Sector, 4 September 1963
- 37th Air Division, 1 April 1966+
- 21st Air Division, 31 December 1969
- Aerospace Defense Command, 1 October 1975
- Tactical Air Command, 1 October 1979
- First Air Force, 6 December 1985 – 31 May 1993
- Eighth Air Force, 1 October 1994
- Third Air Force, 1 October 2002
- 48th Fighter Wing, 8 October 2004 – 28 June 2006
- 33rd Fighter Wing, 2 July 2024 – present

=== Components ===
==== Operational Components ====
Divisions

- 65th Air Division, 24 April 1952 – 8 March 1954

Groups

- 85th Operations Group, 1 October 1994 – 1 July 1995
- 1400th Operations Group, 18 December 1955 – 1 July 1960

Squadrons

- 56th Rescue Squadron, 1 July 1995 – 28 June 2006
- 57th Fighter-Interceptor Squadron (later 57th Fighter Squadron), 13 November 1954 – 18 December 1955; 1 July 1960 – 31 May 1993; 2 July 2024 – present
- 85th Operations Support Squadron (later 85th Operations Squadron), 1 July 1985 – 28 June 2006;
- 305th Bombardment Squadron (later 499th Fighter-Bomber Squadron), 10 February 1942 – 1 May 1944

Located at Harris Neck AAF. Georgia after 11 December 1943.

- 306th Bombardment Squadron (later 500th Fighter-Bomber Squadron), 10 February 1942 – 1 May 1944
- 307th Bombardment Squadron (later 501st Fighter-Bomber Squadron), 10 February 1942 – 1 May 1944
- 308th Bombardment Squadron (later 502d Fighter-Bomber Squadron), 10 February 1942 – 1 May 1944

Located at Punta Gorda AAF, Florida after 3 December 1943 (detached to 337th Fighter Group).

- 667th Aircraft Control and Warning Squadron, 1 July 1960 – 30 September 1988
- 932d Aircraft Control and Warning Squadron (later 932d Air Defense Squadron, 932d Air Control Squadron), 8 March 1954 – 18 December 1955; 1 July 1960 – 31 May 1993; 1 July 1995 – 28 July 2006
- 933d Aircraft Control and Warning Squadron, 18 April 1955 – 18 December 1955; 1 July 1960 – 8 October 1960
- 934th Aircraft Control and Warning Squadron, 1 July 1960 – 8 October 1960

==== Support Components ====
Groups

- 85th Support Group, 1 October 1994 – 1 July 1995
- 1400th Air Base Group, 1 April 1952 – 1 July 1960
- 1400th Maintenance & Supply Group, 1 May 1959 – 1 July 1960
- 1400th USAF Hospital, 1 July 1960 – 1 October 1961

Squadrons

- 85th Civil Engineering Squadron (later 85th Civil Engineer Squadron), 1 July 1985 – 28 June 2006
- 85th Logistics Squadron, 1 July 1985 – c. 30 September 2002
- 85th Mission Support Squadron, 1 July 1985 – 28 June 2006
- 85th Security Police Squadron (later 85th Security Forces Squadron), 1 July 1985 – 28 June 2006
- 1400th Air Base Squadron, 1 July 1960 – 1 October 1961
- 1400th Civil Engineering Squadron, 1 July 1960 – 1 October 1961
- 1400th Consolidated Aircraft Maintenance Squadron, 1 July 1960 – 1 July 1961
- 1400th Supply Squadron, 1 July 1960 – 1 October 1961
- 1400th Support Squadron, 1 July 1960 – 1 July 1962
- 1400th Transportation Squadron, 1 July 1960 – 1 October 1961
- 4557th Security Police Squadron, c. 1985 – 31 May 1993
- 4557th Supply Squadron, 1 March 1987 – 31 May 1993

=== Stations ===
- Army Air Base, Savannah, Georgia, 10 February 1942
- Bowman Field, Kentucky, c. 16 February 1942
- Hunter Field, Georgia, 9 June 1942
- Waycross Army Air Field, Georgia, 15 August 1942
- Gillespie Field, Tennessee, 3 October 1942
- Blythe Army Air Base, California, 2 November 1942
- Rice Army Air Field, California, c. 11 December 1942
- Camp Young, California, 21 January 1943
- Harding Field, Louisiana, 8 April 1943
- Waycross Army Air Field, Georgia, c. 27 August 1943 – 1 May 1944
- Keflavik Airport (later NAS Keflavik), Iceland, 1 April 1952 – 31 May 1993
- NAS Keflavik, Iceland, 1 October 1994 – 28 June 2006
- Ebbing Air National Guard Base, Arkansas, 2 July 2024 – present

=== Aircraft ===
- Vultee V-72 Vengeance, 1942
- Douglas A-24 Banshee, 1942–1943
- North American A-36 Apache, 1943–1944
- Curtiss P-40 Warhawk, 1944
- Republic P-47 Thunderbolt, 1944
- North American F-51 Mustang (rotational aircraft), 1952–1953
- Northrop F-89 Scorpion, 1954–1962
- Convair F-102 Delta Dagger, 1962–1973
- McDonnell F-4 Phantom II, 1973–1985
- F-15 Eagle, 1985–1993, 1994–1995; (rotational aircraft), 1995–2006
- HH-60 Pave Hawk, 1994–2006
- KC-135 Stratotanker (rotational aircraft), 1994–2006
- HC-130P/N (rotational aircraft), 1994–2006
- F-16 Fighting Falcon (rotational aircraft), 1997 and 1999, 2024-present

=== Awards ===
- Air Force Outstanding Unit Award

1 June 1967 – 31 December 1968
1 January 1969 – 31 December 1969
1 January 1970 – 31 August 1970
1 July 1973 – 30 June 1975
1 July 1975 – 30 June 1976

1 July 1976 – 30 June 1978
1 July 1981 – 30 June 1982
1 October 1994 – 31 May 1996
1 June 1996 – 31 May 1997

1 June 1997 – 31 May 1998
1 June 1999 – 31 May 1999
1 June 2000 – 31 May 2001
1 June 2001 – 31 May 2002

1 June 2002 – 30 September 2003
1 October 2003 – 30 September 2004
1 October 2004 – 31 October 2005
1 October 2005 – 28 June 2006

- Air Force Organizational Excellence Award

1 July 1985 – 30 June 1987
1 July 1987 – 30 June 1988
1 July 1990 – 31 May 1992

- American Theater of World War II

== See also ==
- List of United States Air Force aircraft control and warning squadrons
