= Blythe Airport =

Blythe Airport (former Blythe Army Air Field)
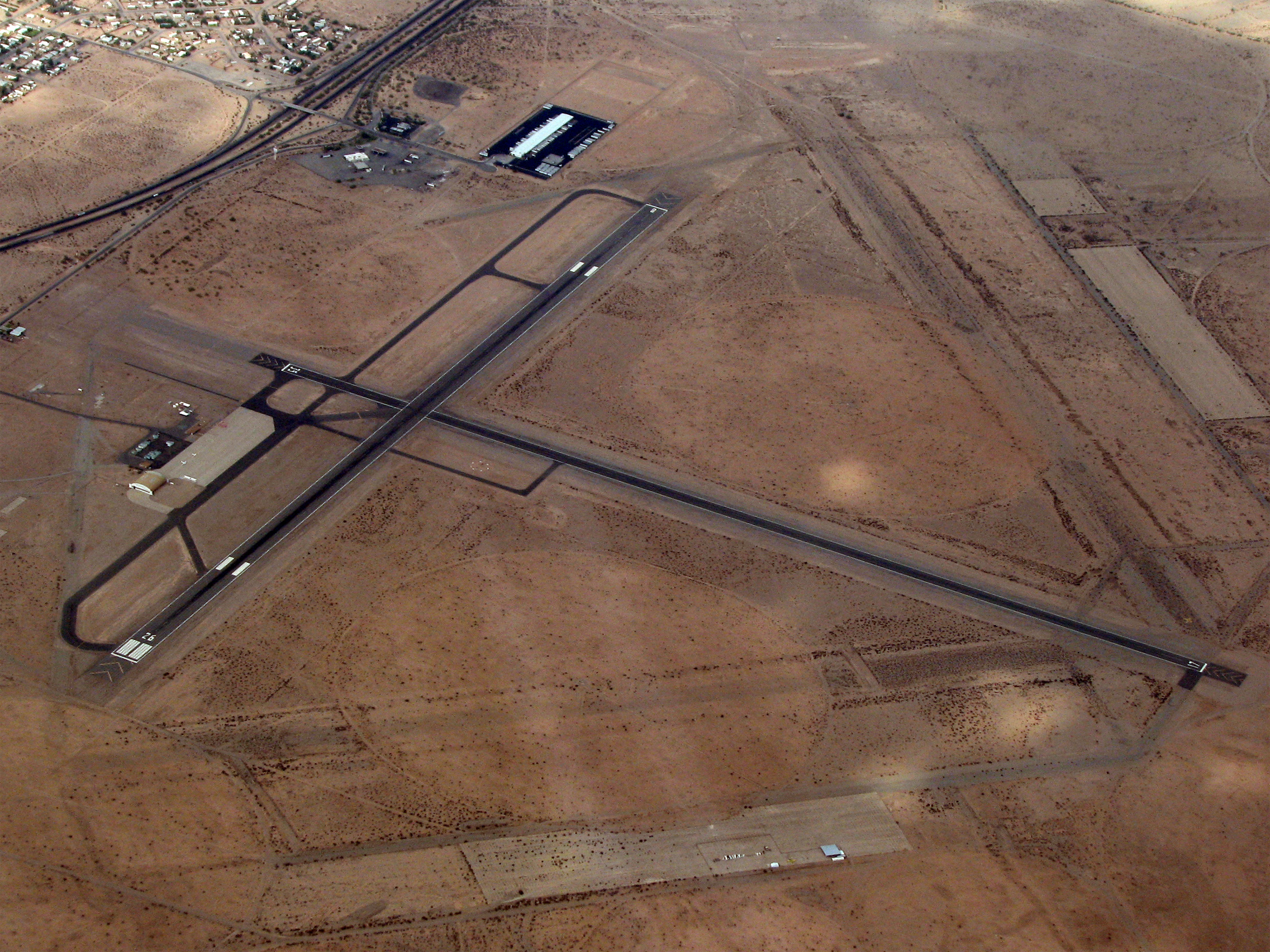
- 2008 aerial photo
- IATA: BLH; ICAO: KBLH; FAA LID: BLH

Summary
- Airport type: Public
- Owner: County of Riverside
- Serves: Blythe, California
- Elevation AMSL: 399 ft (122 m)
- Coordinates: 33°36′53″N 114°42′48″W

Map
- Location in California

Runways
Direction	Length		Surface
Direction	ft	m	Surface
8/26	6,543	1,994	Asphalt
17/35	5,800	1,768	Asphalt

Statistics (2010)
- Aircraft operations: 25,150
- Based aircraft: 5
- Sources: Federal Aviation Administration & GNIS

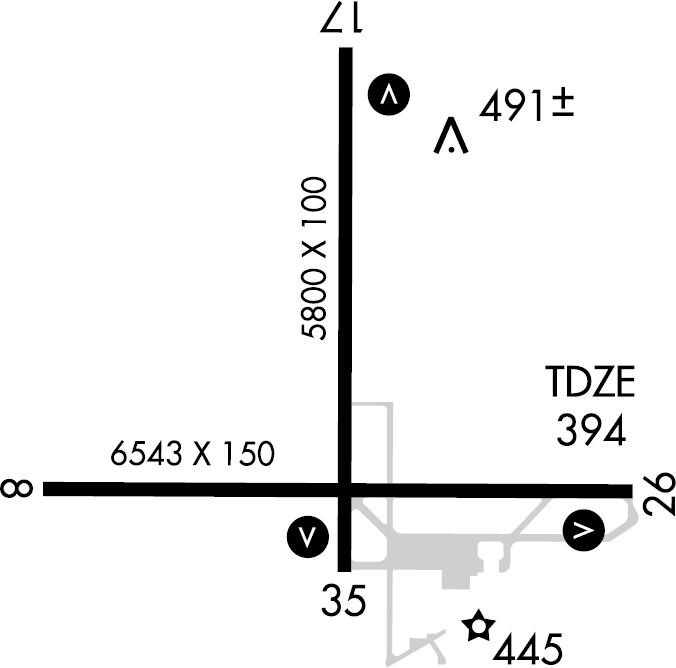

Blythe Airport (IATA: BLH, ICAO: KBLH, FAA LID: BLH) is seven miles west of Blythe, in Riverside County, California, United States. The National Plan of Integrated Airport Systems for 2011–2015 categorized it as a general aviation facility.

== History ==
Blythe Airport was established by the Civil Aeronautics Administration in the late 1930s as an emergency landing field on the Los Angeles to Phoenix airway. A commercial airport opened in April 1940.

The airport was leased by the United States Army in 1942. Between 1942 and 1944, the U.S. War Department acquired 4,248.12 acres in fee from various private parties, 6.54 acres of public domain land by transfer, 282.61 acres by lease from the County of Riverside, a 1.98-acre easement, and a 0.63-acre permit. The Army encroached on another 20.18 acres, increasing the total acquisition for Blythe Army Air Field to 4,560.06 acres. Over 650 buildings and other types of military facilities and improvements were constructed at this airfield, including hangars, office buildings, barracks, warehouses, runways and taxiways, water and sewer systems, a hospital, and fuel and ordnance storage. The base was advertised as the "World's Healthiest Air Base".

In addition to the main facility at Blythe, several auxiliary airfields were built.

- Gary Field 33°40′45″N 114°38′36″W

Now W R Byron Airport

- Desert Center AAF 33°45′10″N 115°19′35″W

Now Desert Center Airport

During World War II the airfield was known as Blythe Army Air Field and was used by the United States Army Air Forces. The use of the site began on May 14, 1942. Blythe AAB was built for the I Troop Carrier Command but was given up by that command, without ever occupying it, to the Fourth Air Force as part of the United States Army Desert Training Center (DTC) The DTC was established by General George S. Patton shortly after the outbreak of the war. At the time, Blythe was the only air field with construction already under way. For six months, the air field served as the sole air support base for the Army maneuvers under way at the DTC.

The 46th Bombardment Group and later the 85th Bombardment Group occupied the field during the CAMA days and flew a variety of planes including A-31 Vengeances and A-36 Apaches. Once air fields were established at three new locations within the DTC (Thermal, Rice and Desert Center), Blythe field was no longer required for the Army's desert exercises. After General Patton was sent to North Africa, the name of the training center was changed to the California-Arizona Maneuver Area (CAMA). The 46th and 85th Bomb Groups were reassigned.

The Army Air Forces then used Blythe as a heavy bombardment crew training base for the Second Air Force 16th Bombardment Training Wing 358th Combat Crew Training School. The field's mission was changed to the training of combat air crews prior to shipment overseas. The 85th Bombardment Group and the 390th Bombardment Group were active at Blythe AAF in 1942 and 1943. Up to 75 Boeing B-17 Flying Fortresses were flown and maintained at the base. During 1943 and 1944, Blythe AAF was used for squadron pilot training, then in December 1944 reverted to an active heavy bombardment base with Consolidated B-24 Liberators.

Known units assigned to Blythe Army Airfield were:

- 390th Bombardment Group (Heavy) April 1942 – 1943. B-17 Flying Fortresses were active at Blythe AAF in 1942 and 1943.
- 46th Bombardment Group (Light) May 23, 1942 – November 1942. A-20 Havoc
- 85th Bombardment Group (Light) May 23, 1942 – November 1942. A-20 Havoc
- 85th Bombardment Group (Dive) November 2 – December 11, 1942 A-24 Banshee
- 34th Bombardment Group (Heavy) December 15, 1942 – April 1944. B-17 Flying Fortresses and B-24 Liberators
- 398th Bombardment Group (Heavy) April 1943. B-17 Flying Fortresses

At its peak in December 1943, the base had a population just short of 8000 uniformed and civilian personnel. This was twice the population of the city of Blythe, the only community within a one hundred mile radius. By April 1944, only a housekeeping force was assigned to the base. By July 1944, the field was abandoned by the Army and declared surplus. 126 airmen were killed in Blythe Army Air Base-related accidents.

Blythe Army Air Field later became a sub-base of Muroc Army Air Field (now Edwards Air Force Base) on June 30, 1945, and was inactivated on October 18, 1945, although during October–December 1946, the 477th Composite Group (Medium) used the airfield for desert maneuvers, flying North American B-25 Mitchells.

The airfield was declared surplus effective as of July 30, 1946, and was reported to the General Service Administration for disposal. On September 10, 1948, the entire 4,560-acre site was transferred to the County of Riverside via quitclaim deed dated September 10, 1948.

Today a modern airport has been built on the site of the former wartime airfield; however most of the area of what was Blythe Army Air Field has been abandoned to the natural landscape being empty and undeveloped. Abandoned runways and concrete parking ramps are visible in aerial photography.

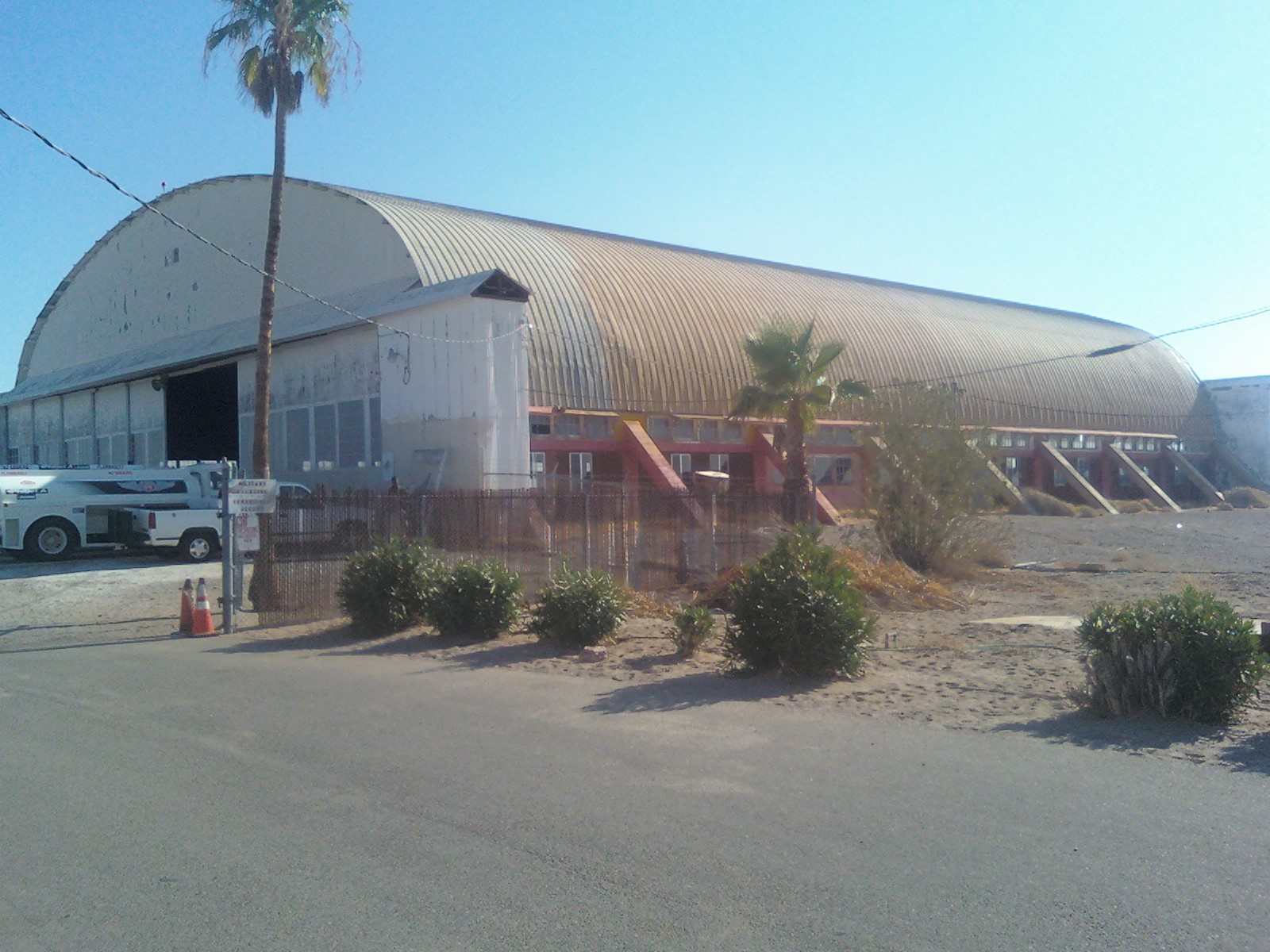
Photo of the main hangar at Blythe Airport taken in August 2009

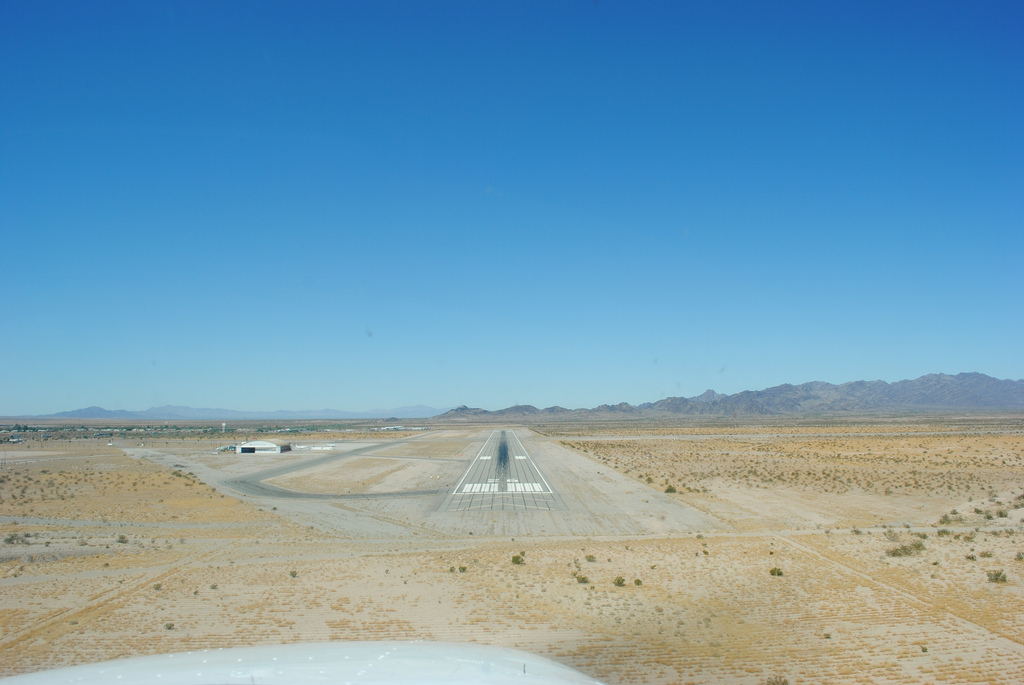
Final approach into runway 26 in September 2009

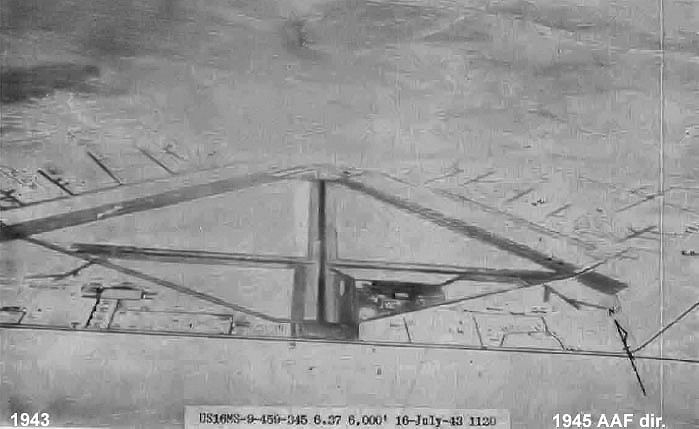
1943 airphoto of Blythe AAF

== Historical airline service ==
Blythe was served by Bonanza Air Lines with Fairchild F-27 turboprops to Los Angeles (LAX), Phoenix, Tucson and other cities. Bonanza merged with Pacific Air Lines and West Coast Airlines to form Air West which continued to operate F-27s from the airport. Air West was then renamed Hughes Airwest which in turn eventually ceased all F-27 passenger service from Blythe.

Several commuter airlines operated flights into the airport in the past as well. Cochise Airlines served Blythe during the early 1980s with Cessna 402 flights nonstop to LAX and also to Yuma, Imperial and Phoenix. Desert Sun Airlines flew Piper Navajos on a LAX-Riverside-Blythe routing in 1985. In 1989, Air L.A. served Blythe with direct service to LAX.

Although this air carrier never served Blythe, Pacific Southwest Airlines (PSA) conducted jet training flights from the Blythe Airport on occasion. PSA was based in San Diego; thus, Blythe was a convenient location for such training flights.

== Facilities ==
Blythe Airport covers 3,904 acres (1,580 ha) at an elevation of 399 feet (122 m). It has two asphalt runways: 8/26 is 6,543 by 150 feet (1,994 x 46 m) and 17/35 is 5,800 by 100 feet (1,768 x 30 m).

In 2010 the airport had 25,150 aircraft operations, average 68 per day: 99% general aviation and 1% military. Five aircraft were then based at this airport, three single-engine and two multi-engine.

== Airlines and destinations ==
=== Cargo ===
Airlines	Destinations
Ameriflight	Ontario

== See also ==
- California World War II Army Airfields
- Desert Training Center

== Other sources ==
- Maurer, Maurer, ed. (1983) [1961]. Air Force Combat Units of World War II (PDF) (reprint ed.). Washington, DC: Office of Air Force History. ISBN 0-912799-02-1. LCCN 61060979. Archived from the original (PDF) on December 20, 2016.
- Maurer, Maurer, ed. (1982) [1969]. Combat Squadrons of the Air Force, World War II (PDF) (reprint ed.). Washington, DC: Office of Air Force History. ISBN 0-405-12194-6. LCCN 70605402. OCLC 72556. Archived from the original (PDF) on December 20, 2016.
- Shaw, Frederick J. (2004). Locating Air Force Base Sites: History’s Legacy. Air Force History and Museums Program, United States Air Force, Washington DC, 2004.
- Wilson, Art (2008). Runways in the Sand:The History of Blythe Army Air Base. Blythe, California: Art Wilson. p. 128. ISBN 978-0-615-21889-2. OCLC 316309702. LCC D769.85.C21 B598 2008
