= Baton Rouge Metropolitan Airport =

Airport in Baton Rouge, Louisiana, United States

Baton Rouge Metropolitan Airport Ryan Field
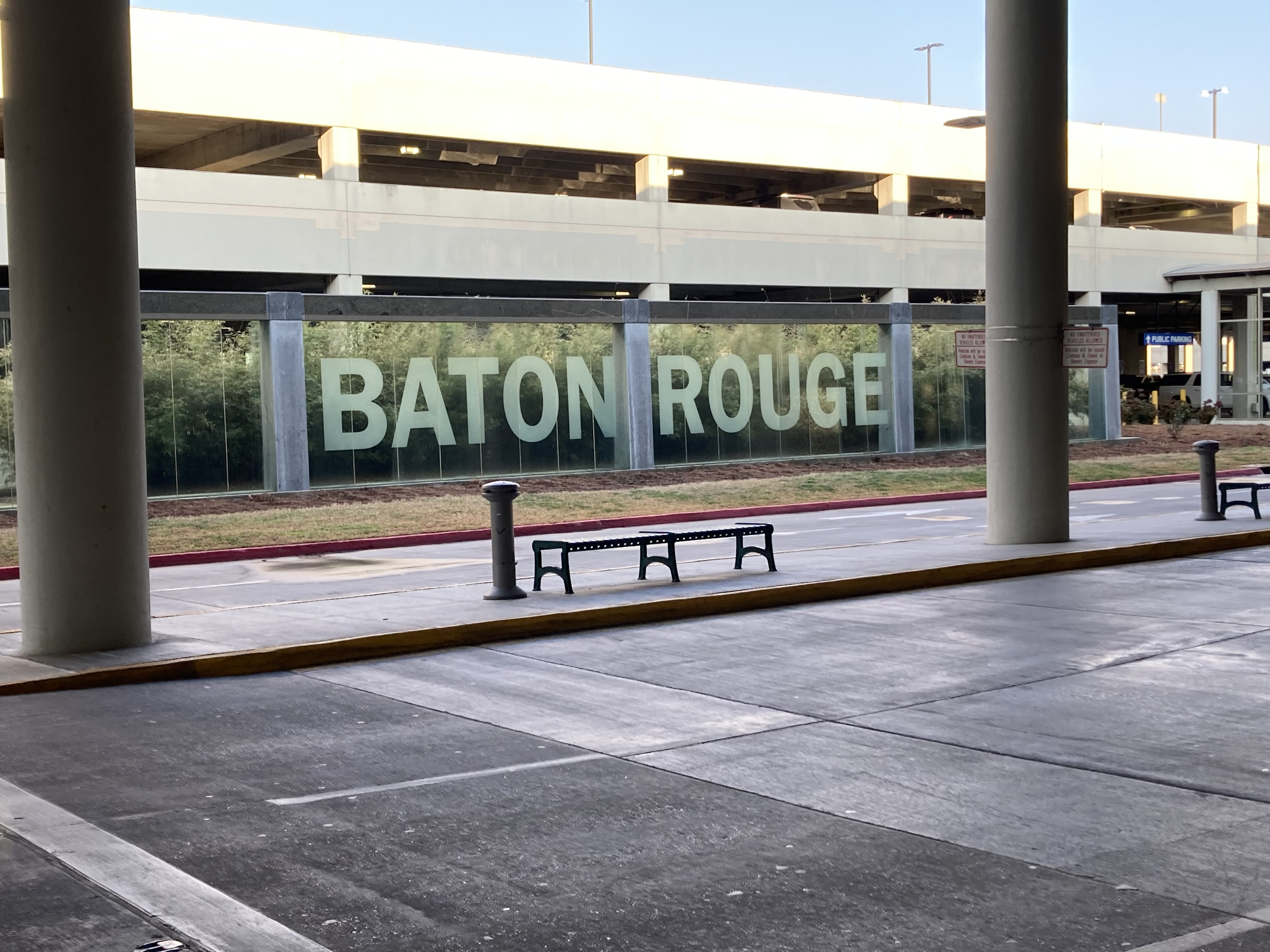
- IATA: BTR; ICAO: KBTR; FAA LID: BTR

Summary
- Airport type: Public
- Owner: City of Baton Rouge/Parish of East Baton Rouge
- Operator: Baton Rouge Airport Authority
- Serves: Baton Rouge, Louisiana, U.S.
- Location: Baton Rouge, Louisiana, U.S.
- Elevation AMSL: 70 ft (21 m)
- Coordinates: 30°31′58″N 091°09′00″W
- Website: www.flybtr.com

Maps
- FAA airport diagram
- Interactive map of Baton Rouge Metropolitan Airport

Runways
Direction	Length		Surface
Direction	ft	m	Surface
4L/22R	7,500	2,286	Concrete
4R/22L	3,799	1,158	Asphalt
13/31	7,005	2,135	Asphalt

Statistics (2018)
- Aircraft operations (year ending 8/31): 55,331
- Based aircraft: 240
- Source: Federal Aviation Administration

Baton Rouge Metropolitan Airport (IATA: BTR, ICAO: KBTR, FAA LID: BTR), also known as Ryan Field, is a public use airport located four miles (7 km) north of the central business district of Baton Rouge, a city in East Baton Rouge Parish, Louisiana, United States.

The airport was originally Harding Field during World War II and was used by the United States Army Air Forces Technical Service Command as a maintenance and supply base. Its uses also included training pilots to fly P-47 Thunderbolts. One of the Thunderbolt pilots trained at Harding was Quentin Aanenson, who survived the war, and in 2007 appeared in Ken Burns' The War, a PBS film about World War II. Training was dangerous, The War noting that "Five members of Aanenson's group of 40 trainees died before they got a chance to go overseas".

Many other aircraft were used at Harding, including P-40 Warhawks, P-39 Airacobras, A-36 Apaches, and B-26 Marauders.

Today, other than the runways, virtually no traces remain of the military installation.

== Facilities and aircraft ==
The airport covers an area of 1,250 acres (510 ha) at an elevation of 70 feet (21 m) above mean sea level. It has three runways: 4L/22R is 7,500 by 150 feet (2,286 × 46 m) with a concrete surface; 4R/22L is 3,799 by 75 feet (1,158 × 23 m) with an asphalt surface; 13/31 is 7,005 by 150 feet (2,135 × 46 m) with an asphalt surface.

Air Traffic Services are provided by dedicated Air Traffic Controllers in the tower and the Terminal Radar Approach Control.

For 2018, the airport had 51,070 aircraft operations with 17,695 of those being commercial air carrier flights. Other aircraft operations include 32,362 General Aviation (GA) and 1,013 military.

This airport is also the main airport used by the Louisiana State Police Air Support Unit.

== Airlines and destinations ==
=== Passenger ===
Airlines	Destinations
American Eagle	Charlotte, Dallas/Fort Worth, Washington–National
Delta Air Lines	Atlanta
United Express	Houston–Intercontinental

Annual passenger traffic (arrivals and departures) at BTR 2005–present (12 months ending December)
Year	Passengers	Year	Passengers	Year	Passengers	Year	Passengers	Year	Passengers
2005	1,014,000	2010	766,000	2015	726,000	2020	352,000	2025	824,000
2006	1,054,000	2011	782,000	2016	719,000	2021	546,000		
2007	952,000	2012	802,000	2017	749,000	2022	649,000		
2008	820,000	2013	788,000	2018	774,000	2023	742,000		
2009	685,000	2014	754,000	2019	790,000	2024	821,000		

Historically, the Baton Rouge Metropolitan Airport (BTR) was served by American Airlines, Continental Airlines (now United Airlines), Eastern Airlines, Northwest Airlines (now Delta Air Lines), Southern Airways, which merged with North Central Airlines to form Republic Airlines which in turn then continued to serve the airport, and Trans-Texas Airways (TTa) which subsequently changed its name to Texas International Airlines. All of these airlines operated mainline jet service from the airport with the exception of Eastern which flew Martin 4-0-4 and Convair 440 twin prop "Silver Falcon" airliners from Baton Rouge in the 1950s. Mainline jet aircraft types operated in passenger service from Baton Rouge in the past included Boeing 727-100, 727-200, 737-200, 737-300 and 737-500 jetliners as well as Douglas DC-9-10 and DC-9-30 jets and also McDonnell Douglas MD-80 jetliners.

Currently, commercial airline service at the airport is primarily operated with Canadair CRJ or Embraer ERJ regional jets flown by the regional affiliates of the major airlines that serve Baton Rouge. Most Delta and American flights are operated with larger, multi-class regional jets including CRJ-700, CRJ-900, and E175 aircraft that offer coach, premium coach, and first class seating options. Delta also uses mainline Boeing 717 jets for some flights. United Express flights are operated with a mix of E175, CRJ-700, and ERJ-145 aircraft.

=== Top destinations ===
Busiest domestic routes from Baton Rouge Regional (September 2025 – August 2026)
Rank	City	Passengers
1	(Georgia (U.S. state)) Atlanta, Georgia	133,200
2	Dallas/Fort Worth, Texas	115,360
3	Houston-Intercontinental, Texas	101,090
4	Charlotte, North Carolina	43,910
5	(Virginia) Washington–National, DC	13,230

== Cargo terminal ==
Baton Rouge Metropolitan Airport has a 33,000-square-foot (3,100 m^{2}) cargo facility. It is currently being expanded to 68,000 square feet (6,300 m^{2}).

== Challenges ==
Baton Rouge Metropolitan Airport is slightly smaller than might be expected for a city and metro area of its size due in part to its proximity to New Orleans' Armstrong International Airport. Despite aggressive advertising campaigns encouraging catchment area residents to use the airport, passenger numbers are in the FAA's small-hub classification (slightly over 800,000 passengers per year). However, the airport is the second largest in Louisiana by passenger volume and is served by the major, network airlines: American, Delta and United. With service to some of largest hub airports in the U.S., connections are available to and from destinations worldwide. At one time, ViaAir started low-cost, nonstop service to Austin (year-round) and Orlando (June–August).

In the wake of Hurricane Katrina, and the ensuing increase in Baton Rouge's (temporary and permanent) population, BTR saw its destination portfolio expanded dramatically. New services were initiated to Cincinnati, New York City (both Newark Liberty and LaGuardia airports), Chicago–O'Hare, Denver, Washington-National, St. Louis, and Orlando. The new destinations were discontinued by the end of 2008, as New Orleans air service returned to pre-Katrina levels. After experiencing record fuel prices in 2008 and the subsequent recession, the carriers returned their focus to the most efficient hub options for BTR, resulting in the current service schedule of daily jet flights to four major hubs. Vision Airlines also briefly served Baton Rouge with Boeing 737 jetliner service nonstop to Las Vegas (LAS) and Fort Walton Beach/Destin, FL (VPS); however, these flights were suspended when Vision discontinued scheduled, commercial air service.

== Expansion and development ==
Louisiana Aircraft Inc., a fixed-base operator on the south side of the airport, has been purchased by a real estate developer. The developer has plans to build more hangar space and has purchased the old Capitol Jet Center / LuxJet FBO on the east side of the airport. Future plans include a ramp and hangars on the north side of the airfield. The increase in hangar space is most noticeable during the College Football season. This future expansion is causing the Army National Guard armory of the 769th Combat Engineer Battalion to relocate to the other side of Baton Rouge.

On June 24, 2010, US Airways recommenced operations to Charlotte from BTR.

In March 2012, a project to expand the rotunda area of the terminal began. The purpose of the project was to relieve the traffic jams inside the terminal caused by passengers going through security screening or departing the airport close to the walkway from the parking garage and the waiting area. The renovation project is expected to be completed sometime in August 2013.

In September 2013, Baton Rouge Metro Airport announced that the August passenger volume had hit a 5 year high. The airport achieved its best August passenger count in five years. A total of 66,860 passengers passed through the airport for the month. The August departing passengers (enplanements) were up 11% at 33,465. Arriving passengers (deplanements) were up 7.08% at 33,395. Delta maintained the top August market share at 42%, followed by United at 25%, American Eagle at 24% and US Airways at 9%. Delta had the biggest passenger increase among the BTR airlines at +13.03% in enplanements and +10.15% in deplanements.

Delta has also begun scheduling larger, dual-class aircraft into BTR, including CRJ 700/900, MD-88, Boeing 717, and Airbus A319 aircraft. All four aircraft types have both first and economy class seating.

In September 2013, Baton Rouge Metro Airport announced Delta's "Red Coat" Service has been implemented at the check in terminal to assist customers.

The expanded rotunda opened in October 2013 and the TSA checkpoint was re-located to the new area, providing more room and allowing an additional line to be added when necessary. The original rotunda now serves as a spacious arrival court where guests without tickets can wait on arriving passengers. Construction of new restrooms and vending in the arrival court are complete. New restrooms on Concourse A are also open, including a family restroom and breast-feeding room. The new rotunda provides an airy space for passengers that includes a floor-to-ceiling glass wall with a great view of the airfield and runways. New seating in the rotunda provides an outlet at each seat, and a charging station has been added at the beginning on Concourse A. The renovated food court now includes PJ's Coffee and WOW Cafe: American Grill and Wingery. The airport sports lounge has also been expanded and renovated. Other airport amenities include free Wi-Fi, a business center, chapel, and a children's playroom.

In January 2016, it was announced the airport was seeking to open a hotel that would connect to the BTR terminal. Baton Rouge Metro Airport is looking to add a hotel and restaurant to its north Baton Rouge terminal in hopes of growing airport revenue and adding convenience for travelers.

Since 2016, United has begun scheduling larger ERJ-175 aircraft which include first, economy plus, and coach class seating.

The airport's board of commissioners accepted a request for proposals from Holiday Inn representatives to explore building a 147-room hotel with a Mike Anderson's Seafood. Holiday Inn representatives are still studying the market, but they are expected to make a determination in the next couple of months on whether they can build the hotel.

== Accidents and incidents ==
- On October 20, 1977 a plane chartered by rock band Lynyrd Skynyrd was en route to the airport during their Tour of the Survivors but crashed in a swamp in southern Mississippi 15 miles northeast of the airport due to fuel exhaustion, killing six people; the pilot and copilot, three band members and one crew member. The rest were severely injured.
- On March 16, 1984, sex offender Jeff Doucet was shot in the head while being escorted through the airport by police officers; the shooter Gary Plauché was captured on the spot, while Doucet died the following day in hospital. The incident had occurred because Plauché had found out that Doucet had been sexually abusing his son.
- On September 2, 2011, Atlantic Southeast Airlines Flight 5058 operated by Canadair CRJ-200 N875AS landed with the port main undercarriage retracted. There were no injuries among the 50 passengers and three crew on board.
- On June 7, 2013, a Beechcraft Super King Air operated by Osage Air LLC crashed 2.9 miles N of Baton Rouge Int'l Airport shortly after takeoff. Probable causes were the pilot's failure to maintain airspeed and lack of knowledge of the avionics. The crash occurred in a residential area, damaging two homes. The sole occupant, the pilot, was killed.

== See also ==
- List of airports in Louisiana
- Louisiana World War II Army Airfields
