= 8th Airlift Squadron =

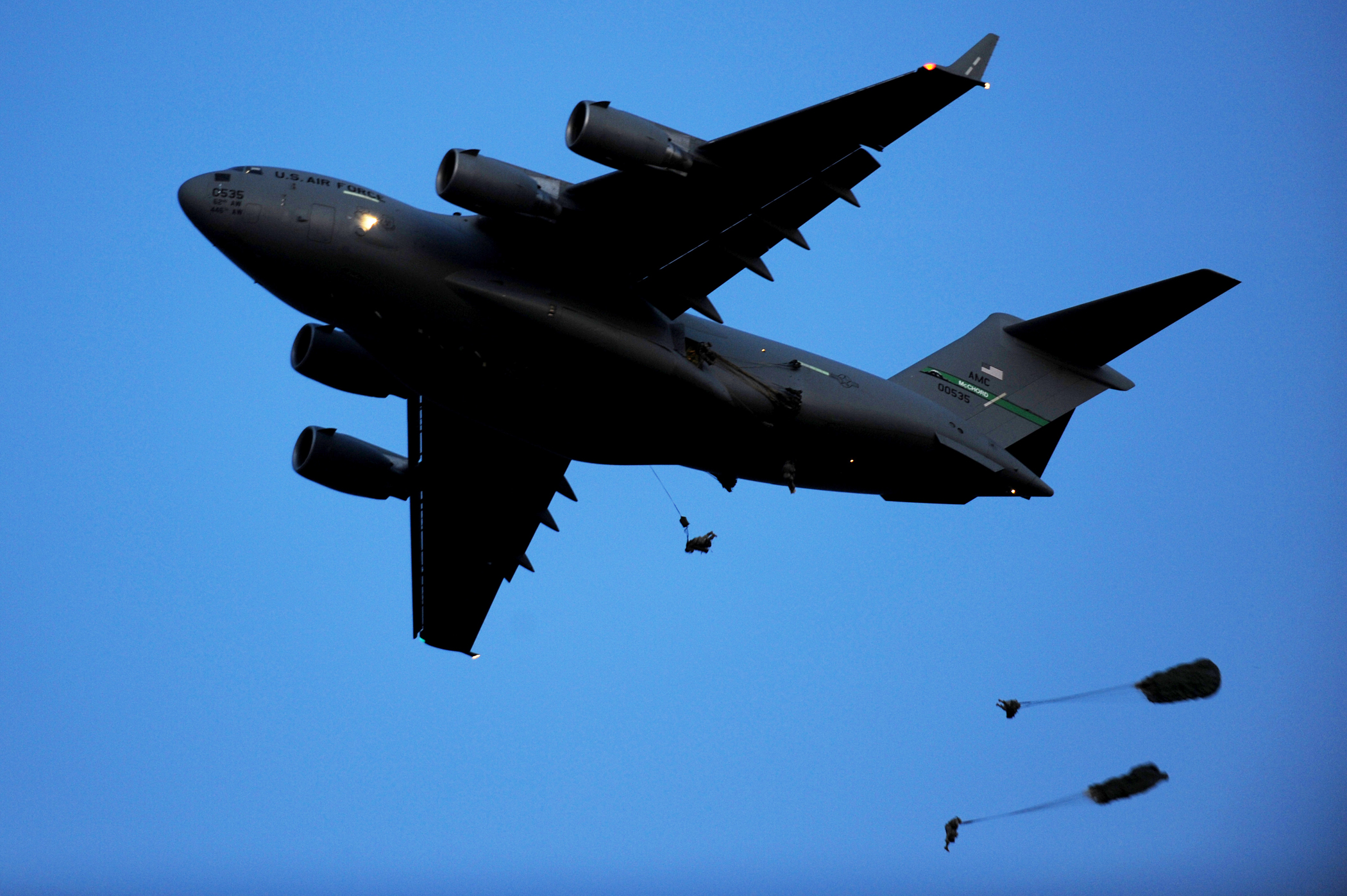
- 8th Airlift Squadron C-17A drops paratroopers from the 82nd Airborne Division during a joint forcible entry exercise (Note: Aircraft is Boeing C-17A Globemaster III, serial 90-535. Taken at a drop zone at Fort Bragg, North Carolina on 28 April 2010.)
- Active: 1940–1945; 1946–present
- Country: United States
- Branch: United States Air Force
- Role: Airlift
- Part of: Air Mobility Command
- Garrison/HQ: McChord Air Force Base, Washington
- Motto: First in War First in Peace
- Engagements: European-African-Middle East Campaign World War II: Tunisia; Sicily; Naples-Foggia; Rome-Arno; Southern France; North Apennines; Po Valley; Armed Forces Expeditionary: Operation Just Cause (Panama), 1989–90

- Decorations: Meritorious Unit Award Air Force Outstanding Unit Award (13x) Republic of Vietnam Gallantry Cross with Palm

Insignia
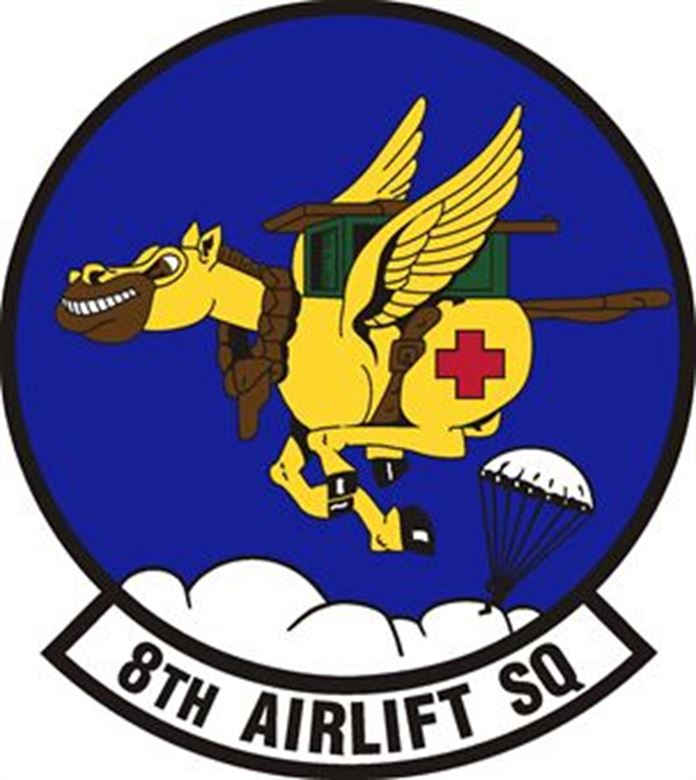
- 8th Airlift Squadron emblem (approved 12 June 1943)

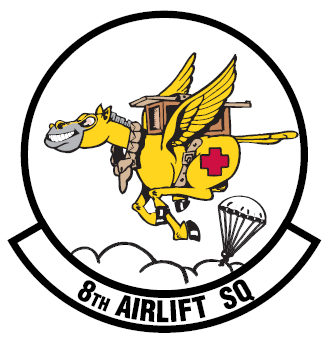
- 8th Airlift Squadron emblem (approved 1994)

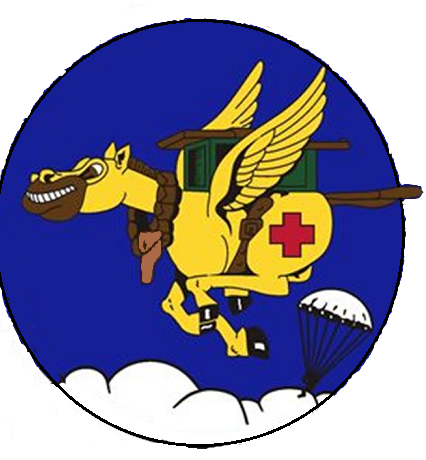
- 8th Troop Carrier Squadron emblem (approved 12 June 1943)

The 8th Airlift Squadron is part of the 62d Airlift Wing at Joint Base Lewis-McChord, (McChord Air Force Base), Washington. It operates Boeing C-17 Globemaster III aircraft supporting the United States Air Force global reach mission worldwide.

== Mission ==
Train and equip Boeing C-17 Globemaster III aircrews for global airland and airdrop operations.

== History ==
=== Initial organization ===
The squadron's origins date to 1 October 1933 when it was constituted as the 8th Transport Squadron and assigned to the 2d Transport Group in the Fifth Corps Area in inactive status. The unit became a Regular Army Inactive unit when reserve personnel were assigned to it in June 1938 at Patterson Field, Ohio. (Note: Regular Army Inactive units were units that were constituted in the regular army. Although they were not activated, they were organized with reserve personnel during the 1920s and early 1930s. Even though they had reserve personnel assigned, they were not Organized Reserve units. Because they had no regular personnel they were still considered inactive in the regular army. Clay, p. vi) On 1 February 1940, these reserve personnel were withdrawn and the squadron was activated at Brooks Field, Texas, and assigned to the 10th Transport Group. Once organized it moved to nearby Duncan Field where it became a transport squadron for supplies and equipment managed by the San Antonio Air Depot. It moved on 29 June 1941 to Hill Field, Utah where it performed the same mission for the Ogden Air Depot.

=== World War II ===
After the Pearl Harbor Attack, the squadron was transferred to the 62d Troop Carrier Group and re-equipped with Douglas C-47 Skytrain transports. Transferred to Kellogg Field, Michigan, the squadron trained for combat resupply and casualty evacuation mission at several airfields during the spring and summer of 1942. The 8th deployed to England, where it became part of Eighth Air Force in September 1942. Performed intratheater transport flights of personnel, supply and equipment within England during summer and fall of 1942, reassigned to Twelfth Air Force after Operation Torch, the invasion of North Africa, and moved to Tafaraoui Airfield, Algeria.

In combat, the squadron performed resupply and evacuation missions across Morocco, Algeria and Tunisia during the North African Campaign. During June 1943, the unit began training with gliders in preparation for Operation Husky, the invasion of Sicily. It towed gliders to Syracuse, Sicily and dropped paratroopers at Catania during the operation. After moving to Sicily, the squadron airdropped supplies to escaped prisoners of war in Northern Italy in October. It operated from Sicily until December until moving to the Italian mainland in December.

The squadron supported the Italian Campaign during balance of 1944 supporting partisans in the Balkans. Its unarmed aircraft flew at night over uncharted territory, landing at small unprepared airfields to provide guns, ammunition, clothing, medical supplies, gasoline, and mail to the partisans. It even carried jeeps and mules as cargo. On return trips it evacuated wounded partisans, evadees and escaped prisoners. It carried paratroopers during Operation Dragoon, the invasion of Southern France in August 1944. The squadron then returned to operations over Italy and in the Balkans until the end of combat in Europe, May 1945.

=== Cold War ===
The squadron returned to the United States in September 1946, being assigned to the troop carrier squadron training school at Bergstrom Field, Texas. When the school closed in July 1947, it moved to McChord Field, Washington where its parent 62d Troop Carrier Wing became the host unit at the airfield after reorganizing under the wing base organization system. It conducted routine peacetime transport operations, training with Army units at Fort Lewis with simulated combat parachute training drops flying Curtiss C-46 Commandos and the new Fairchild C-82 Packet combat cargo aircraft, designed to operate from forward, rugged airfields. It deployed to Alaska in September 1947 where it flew airlift missions from Elmendorf Field during the winter of 1947–1948, returning to McChord in March 1948. In October 1949 it received the long-distance Douglas C-54 Skymaster.

On 1 June 1950, its parent 62d Wing was inactivated, while the 62d Troop Carrier Group, less the 4th Troop Carrier Squadron moved for a short time to Kelly Air Force Base, Texas, returning in July. During the Korean War, the squadron flew long, over-water trans-Pacific missions to Japan from McChord. In 1951, it upgraded to the new Douglas C-124 Globemaster II strategic airlifter. It moved to nearby Larson Air Force Base when McChord was taken over by Air Defense Command in 1952. From Larson, the squadron airlifted troops, blood plasma, aircraft parts, ammunition, medical supplies, and much more, primarily to Japan, in support of the Korean War until the armistice in June 1953. During the balance of the 1950s, the squadron supported the French forces in French Indochina, transporting a replacement French garrison to Dien Bien Phu in 1954.

By 1955 the Cold War was well under way, and the North American Air Defense Command set out to build a chain of radar stations on the northernmost reaches of the continent. This chain of radars, known as the Distant Early Warning Line (DEW Line), was to detect incoming Soviet missiles and bombers, and give American forces enough warning to launch a counterattack, and get the National Command Authorities to safety. Between 1955 and 1957, the squadron began to fly missions to the Alaskan arctic regions, carrying 13 million pounds of supplies and equipment to build the DEW Line. The resupply of the DEW Line stations kept the squadron occupied until 1969. Its Globemasters also flew airlift missions in South Vietnam as the growing American commitment required more troops, supplies and equipment.

=== Vietnam War ===
In a realignment of assets, the squadron's parent 62d Troop Carrier Wing moved back to McChord in June 1960. During the early 1960s, the squadron found itself back in Indochina by April 1962. At a time when overt American participation in the war in Vietnam was minimized, the squadron began carrying Army supplies and equipment from Dover Air Force Base, Delaware, to Saigon, South Vietnam. The next month, the squadron participated in Operation Spare Bed, airlifting an Army field hospital to a classified location in Thailand. During the 1960s the aircraft of the squadron found themselves almost continually supporting United States military missions in South Vietnam as the growing American commitment required more troops, supplies and equipment. The squadron was upgraded to the Lockheed C-141 Starlifter intercontinental jet transport in 1966 flying troops and supplies regularly to Tan Son Nhut, Cam Ranh Bay and Da Nang Air Bases in South Vietnam, as well as Clark Air Base in the Philippines and Don Muang Airport in Thailand, among others.

With the ending of the United States involvement in the Vietnam War in the early 1970s, the squadron flew missions in support of Operation Homecoming, the return of prisoners of war from Vietnam in early 1973. Missions were flown to Hanoi, North Vietnam to pick up the Prisoners and transport them to Clark Air Base. Subsequently, they were flown back to the United States, to return to their waiting families. In March 1975, with the fall of South Vietnam imminent, the squadron returned to Saigon one last time during Operation Babylift, which carried hundreds of Vietnamese orphans to the United States, where adoptive parents awaited their arrival.

=== Return to peacetime support ===
During the 1970s, the squadron returned to a peacetime status, with routine flights around the world carrying personnel, equipment and supplies as needed. This was interrupted in 1978 following the mass murder-suicide of more than 900 people at the Jonestown religious compound in Guyana, South America. The squadron airlifted bodies to a morgue at Dover Air Force Base (most of the victims were U.S. Citizens). Crew members reported using their oxygen masks during the flight, in an effort to stifle the stench of decaying bodies in the cargo compartment.

In 1980, the squadron began to exchange its Lockheed C-141A Starlifters for newer, "stretched" C-141B models. This new version of the aircraft increased its cargo carrying capacity by inserting two fuselage plugs, one forward, one aft of the wings, totaling just over 23 feet in length. The B series modification also added an air refueling receptacle, giving yet longer range to the C-141.

=== Desert Storm ===
In August 1990, totalitarian Iraq invaded Kuwait, on the shores of the Persian Gulf. Within days the squadron began flying missions to the Middle East as part of Operation Desert Shield, the effort to deter further aggression from Iraq. The operation's tempo was unprecedented. By January 1991, Desert Shield became Desert Storm, as allied air power was unleashed upon the invaders with irresistible force. The squadron joined the rest of the Military Airlift Command in providing round-the-clock airlift to the Middle East, keeping the air war supplied, and aiding the buildup of ground forces for the highly successful, though brief ground war in February. Before long, Kuwait was free, although the tremendous effort put forth by the squadron had accelerated the aging process of its C-141s. The increased payloads and almost incessant flying would have lasting negative effects on the fleet.

=== Recent operations ===
In early 1992, squadron crews and aircraft began participating in Operation Provide Hope, helping to deliver hundreds of tons of food and medicine to the former Soviet Union. By August; Operation Provide Relief (later known as Operation Restore Hope), rushing food supplies to the starving people of Somalia; the relief of victims of Hurricane Andrew in America, and relief efforts for the Guamanian victims of Typhoon Omar kept our crews and aircraft on the move.

In late 1995, President Bill Clinton ordered the deployment of 20,000 U.S. troops to the former Yugoslav Republic of Bosnia, as part of a multinational peacekeeping force. Squadron aircraft were deployed to Rhein-Main Air Base, Germany, by 18 December. In spite of severe weather conditions, crews and aircraft were soon flying troops and equipment into Taszar Air Base, Hungary, for Operation Joint Endeavor. In January 1996 the squadron, operating under a provisional wing located at Rhein-Main, continued supporting airlift missions into Tuzla and Sarajevo, Bosnia-Herzegovina, and Taszar in support of Operation Joint Endeavor. In April 1996, the squadron provided equipment and personnel transportation in support of an airpower expeditionary force in the Middle Eastern Kingdom of Jordan as part of Operation Southern Watch.

On the night of 15 May 1996, aircrews took part in Big Drop III, the largest airdrop since World War II. The squadron helped deploy members of the Army 82nd Airborne Division, U.K. 5th Airborne Brigade personnel, and their heavy equipment onto three drop zones on Fort Bragg, North Carolina. A humanitarian mission included the deliverance of relief supplies from Kadena Air Base, Japan to Ho Chi Minh City, Vietnam after Typhoon Linda devastated the area in early November 1997. The typhoon unleashed torrential rains and winds that wiped out coastal villages, killed hundreds of people and left thousands homeless.

In 2000, the squadron retired its Starlifters for the new Boeing C-17 Globemaster III airlifter. In a response to the terrorist attacks against America on 11 September 2001, President George W. Bush initiated war against terrorism named Operation Infinite Justice, later renamed Operation Enduring Freedom. The squadron supported these efforts by airlifting troops and supplies destined for Afghanistan. It also flew humanitarian airdrops that hundreds of thousands of the rations for starving Afghans. Flights in support of Coalition efforts in Afghanistan continue to the present day.

In January 2003 additional personnel and aircraft would deploy to locations all around the world in support airlift operations. By the end of January all aircraft supporting this effort would fly their missions from Charleston Air Force Base, South Carolina. Similar C-17 stage operations had been operating into Afghanistan from a base in Germany. After repeated noncompliance to UN demands Operation Iraqi Freedom began. "On my orders, coalition forces have begun striking selected targets of military importance to undermine Saddam Hussein's ability to wage war," President Bush stated in an address to the nation. Under the cover of darkness at a forward operation location at Aviano Air Base, Italy on 26 March 2003, squadron aircraft flew into combat in Northern Iraq. The nine-hour mission, covering distance roughly the equivalent of Seattle to St. Louis, delivered members of the Army's 173rd Airborne Brigade into an area north of Baghdad. This mission, the largest combat airdrop since the invasion of Panama in December 1989 in Operation Just Cause, was the first combat insertion of paratroopers using C-17's. Operations in support of Operation Iraqi Freedom continued until the United States withdraw from Iraq at the end of 2011.

== Lineage ==
- Constituted as the 8th Transport Squadron on 1 October 1933

Activated on 1 February 1940
Redesignated 8th Troop Carrier Squadron on 4 July 1942
Inactivated on 11 November 1945

- Activated on 7 September 1946

Redesignated 8th Troop Carrier Squadron, Medium on 23 June 1948
Redesignated 8th Troop Carrier Squadron, Heavy on 12 October 1949
Redesignated 8th Air Transport Squadron, Heavy on 1 January 1965
Redesignated 8th Military Airlift Squadron on 8 January 1966
Redesignated 8th Airlift Squadron on 1 December 1991

=== Assignments ===
- 10th Transport Group, 1 February 1940
- 62d Transport Group (later 62d Troop Carrier Group), 11 December 1940 – 11 November 1945
- 62d Troop Carrier Group, 7 September 1946 (attached to Alaskan Air Command until 1 December 1948, (Note: Bailey says the attachment began on 2 September 1946, but the squadron was not active until 7 September.) 62d Troop Carrier Wing after 8 January 1960)
- 62d Troop Carrier Wing (later 62d Air Transport Wing, 62d Military Airlift Wing), 15 January 1960
- 62d Operations Group, 1 December 1991 – present

=== Stations ===
- Brooks Field, Texas, 1 February 1940
- Duncan Field, Texas, 5 November 1940
- Hill Field, Utah, 29 June 1941
- Kellogg Field, Michigan, 26 May 1942
- Florence Army Air Field, South Carolina, 30 June-14 August 1942
- RAF Keevil, England, 25 September 1942
- Tafaraoui Airfield, Algeria, 16 November 1942
- Nouvion Airfield, Algeria, 22 December 1942
- Matemore Airfield, Algeria, 17 May 1943
- El Djem Airfield, Tunisia, 1 July 1943
- Goubrine Airfield, Tunisia, 28 July 1943
- Gela Airfield, Sicily, 7 September 1943
- Ponte Olivo Airfield, Sicily, 30 September 1943
- Gaudo Airfield, Italy, 8 May 1944
- Galera Airfield, Italy, 30 June 1944
- Malignano Airfield, Italy, 5 October 1944
- Tarquinia Airfield, Italy, 9 January 1945
- Rosignano Airfield, Italy, 26 May 1945
- Naples Airport, Italy, October-11 November 1945
- Bergstrom Field, Texas, 7 September 1946
- McChord Field (later McChord Air Force Base), Washington, 14 July 1947

Deployed at Elmendorf Field, Alaska, 2 September-1 December 1948

- Kelly Air Force Base, Texas, 9 May 1950
- McChord Air Force Base, Washington, 27 July 1950
- Larson Air Force Base, Washington, 9 May 1952
- McChord Air Force Base, Washington, 13 June 1960 – present

=== Aircraft ===
- Douglas C-39 (1940–1942)
- Douglas C-47 Skytrain (1942–1945)
- Curtiss C-46 Commando (1946–1947)
- Fairchild C-82 Packet (1947–1949)
- Douglas C-54 Skymaster (1949–1951)
- Douglas C-124 Globemaster II (1951–1969)
- Lockheed C-141 Starlifter (1966–2000)
- Boeing C-17 Globemaster III (1999 – present)
