= 51st Troop Carrier Squadron =

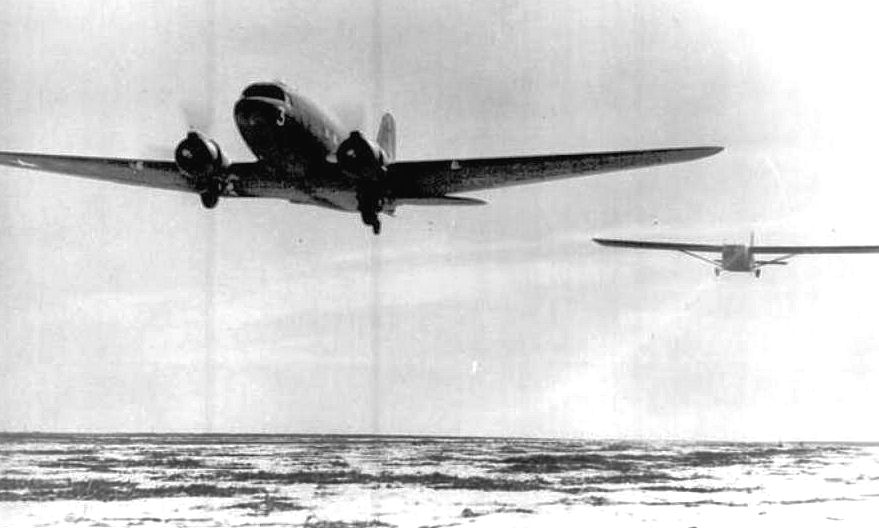
- C-47 Skytrains and Waco CG-4 gliders
- Active: 1942-1946
- Country: United States
- Branch: United States Air Force
- Role: Airlift
- Engagements: Mediterranean Theater of Operations

Insignia
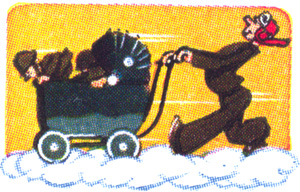
- 51st Troop Carrier Squadron emblem (approved 20 April 1944)

The 51st Troop Carrier Squadron is an inactive United States Air Force unit. Its last assignment was with the Naples Air Force General Depot at Ciampino Airport, Italy, where it was inactivated on 9 March 1946. The squadron was activated in the spring of 1942 as the 51st Transport Squadron, when the 62d Transport Group expanded from three to four squadrons. After training in the United States, the squadron moved briefly to England, then to the Mediterranean Theater of Operations, where it served until V-E Day. It remained in Italy after the war until inactivating.

== History ==
Activated in June 1942 as a I Troop Carrier Command Douglas C-47 Skytrain troop carrier squadron, trained in the United States until being deployed to England. Assigned to VIII Air Support Command, Eighth Air Force in October 1942.

Trained briefly in England until the Operation Torch landings in North Africa during November 1942. Was reassigned to Twelfth Air Force and moved to Tafaraoui Airfield, Algeria on 15 November 1942. The squadron's aircraft flew supplies to front-line units in Algeria and Tunisia during the North African Campaign as soon as suitable landing strips were available and evacuated casualties back to rear area field hospitals.

Squadron engaged in combat operations, dropping airborne units into Sicily during Operation Husky invasion and later into areas around Anzio, Italy as part of Operation Shingle, the invasion of mainland Italy and the initiation of the Italian Campaign, January 1944. Moved north through Italy, 1944–1945 in support of Allied ground forces, evacuated wounded personnel and flew missions behind enemy lines in Italy and the Balkans to haul guns, ammunition, food, clothing, medical supplies, and other materials to the partisans and to drop propaganda leaflets.

Participated in the airborne assault of Southern France, August 1944, dropping airborne forces into the Rhone Valley. With the end of combat in May, 1945, aided in the redeployment of personnel after the war and also hauled freight and mail. Personnel demobilized in Italy on 14 November 1945 and placed in non-operational status, inactivated as an administrative unit in March 1946.

=== Campaigns ===
- Tunisia; Sicily; Naples-Foggia; Rome-Amo; Southern France; North Apennines; Po Valley; Air Combat, EAME Theater.

== Lineage ==
- Constituted as the 51st Transport Squadron on 30 May 1942

Activated on 1 June 1942
Re-designated 51st Troop Carrier Squadron on 4 July 1942
Inactivated on 9 March 1946

=== Assignments ===
- 62d Transport Group (later 62d Troop Carrier) Group, 1 June 1942
- Naples Air Force General Depot, 14 November 1945 – 9 March 1946 (nonoperational after 14 November 1945)

=== Stations ===
- Kellogg Field, Michigan, 1 Jun 1942
- Florence Army Air Field, South Carolina, 1 Jul-14 Aug 1942;
- RAF Keevil (AAF-471), England, 10 Oct 1942
- Tafaraoui Airfield, Algeria, 15 November 1942
- Nouvion Airfield, Algeria, 24 December 1942
- Matemore Airfield, Algeria, 16 May 1943
- Goubrine Airfield, Tunisia, 2 July 1943
- Ponte Olivo Airfield, Sicily, 6 September 1943
- Brindisi Airfield, Italy, February 1944
- Galera Airfield, Italy, 30 June 1944
- Malignano Airfield, Italy, 30 September 1944
- Tarquinia Airfield, Italy, 8 January 1945
- Rosignano Airfield, Italy, 25 May 1945
- Capodichino Airport, Italy, 6 Oct 1945
- Naples, Italy, 6 February-9 March 1946

=== Aircraft ===
- Douglas C-47 Skytrain, 1942-1946
