= 7th Airlift Squadron =

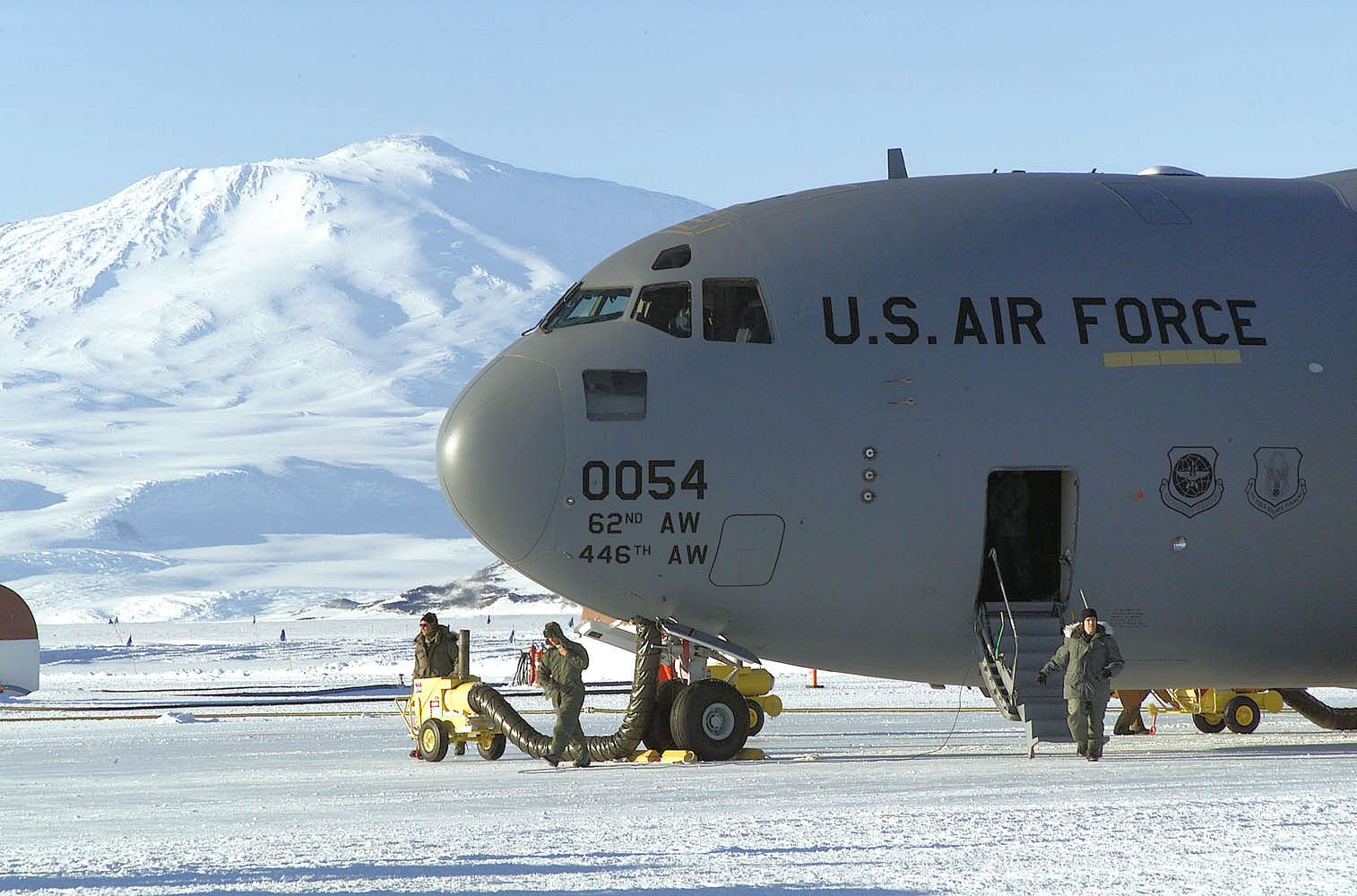
- 7th Airlift Squadron C-17A Globemaster III sits on the sea-ice parking ramp at McMurdo Station, Antarctica (Note: Aircraft is Boeing C-17A Globemaster III, serial 98-54.)
- Active: 1939–1945; 1946–1969; 1971–present
- Country: United States
- Branch: United States Air Force
- Role: Airlift
- Size: Squadron
- Part of: Air Mobility Command
- Garrison/HQ: McChord Air Force Base, Washington
- Motto(s): Always Willing – Always Able
- Engagements: European-African-Middle East Campaign World War II: Tunisia; Sicily; Naples-Foggia; Rome-Arno; Southern France; North Apennines; Po Valley; Armed Forces Expeditionary: Operation Just Cause (Panama), 1989–90

- Decorations: Air Force Meritorious Unit Award Air Force Outstanding Unit Award (13x) Republic of Vietnam Gallantry Cross with Palm

Insignia
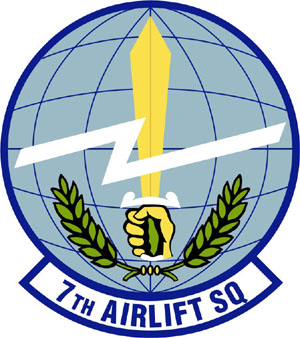
- 7th Airlift Squadron emblem (Note: The date the emblem was redesigned to bring all elements within the disc is not known, but was prior to 1995. Endicott, p. 382 (image and description changed from "Over and through a light blue disc . . ." to "On a light blue disc . . ." The color of the sword hilt was altered after 1995. Compare Endicott, p. 382 with Bailey.)

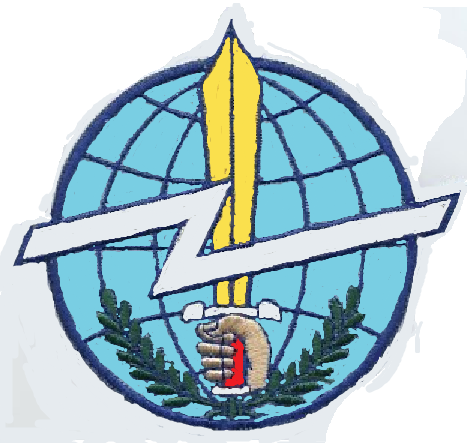
- 7th Troop Carrier Squadron emblem (approved 9 August 1944)

The 7th Airlift Squadron is part of the 62d Airlift Wing at McChord Air Force Base, Washington. It operates Boeing C-17 Globemaster III aircraft supporting the United States Air Force global reach mission worldwide.

== Mission ==
Train and equip C-17 aircrews for global air-land and airdrop operations.

== History ==
=== World War II ===
The squadron's origins begin on 1 October 1933 when it was constituted in the Regular Army Reserve as the 7th Transport Squadron, assigned to the 2d Transport Group in the Fourth Corps Area without personnel or equipment. It was activated on 14 October 1939 in the United States Army Air Corps and activated at the Sacramento Air Depot, California, assigned to the 10th Transport Group. It was equipped with Douglas C-33 transports, tasked with transporting supplies and equipment from the depots to field units at airfields in the Western United States.

After the Pearl Harbor Attack, the squadron was transferred to the 62d Troop Carrier Group and re-equipped with Douglas C-47 Skytrain transports. After being transferred to Selfridge Field, Michigan for training, the squadron trained for combat resupply and casualty evacuation mission at several airfields during the spring and summer of 1942. Was ordered deployed to England, assigned to Eighth Air Force in September 1942. Performed intra-theater transport flights of personnel, supply and equipment within England during summer and fall of 1942, reassigned to Twelfth Air Force after Operation Torch invasion of North Africa, initially stationed at Tafaraoui Airfield, Algeria.

In combat, performed resupply and evacuation missions across Morocco, Algeria and Tunisia during North African Campaign. In March 1943, the squadron was temporarily transferred to Royal Air Force control where it supported the British Eighth Army in the Western Desert Campaign by moving essential munitions, supplies and other equipment from Palestine and Egypt to the front lines in Libya. It returned to Twelfth Air Force control in Algeria at the end of May.

During June 1943, the unit began training with gliders in preparation for Operation Husky, the invasion of Sicily. It towed gliders to Syracuse, Sicily and dropped paratroopers at Catania during the operation. After moving to Sicily, the squadron airdropped supplies to escaped prisoners of war in Northern Italy in October. Operated from Sicily until December until moving to Italian mainland in December.

Supported the Italian Campaign during balance of 1944 supporting partisans in the Balkans. Its unarmed aircraft flew at night over uncharted territory, landing at small unprepared airfields to provide guns, ammunition, clothing, medical supplies, gasoline, and mail to the partisans. It even carried jeeps and mules as cargo. On return trips it evacuated wounded partisans, evadees and escaped prisoners. During the spring of 1944, the squadron was transferred to Tenth Air Force in India where it carried combat cargo during the Siege of Myitkyina, Burma. Returning to the Mediterranean Theater of Operations in July 1944, it carried paratroopers during Operation Dragoon, the invasion of Southern France in August 1944. The squadron then returned to operations over Italy and in the Balkans until end of combat in Europe, May 1945. In all the 4th earned nine Campaign streamers during operations in both the European and China-Burma-India theaters in the Second World War.

=== Cold War ===
The squadron returned to the United States in September 1946, being assigned to the troop carrier squadron training school at Bergstrom Field, Texas. When the school closed in July 1947, it was moved to McChord Field, Washington where its parent 62d Troop Carrier Group became the host unit at the airfield. It conducted routine peacetime transport operations, training with Army units at Fort Lewis with simulated combat parachute training drops flying Curtiss C-46 Commandos and the new Fairchild C-82 Packet combat cargo aircraft, designed to operate from forward, rugged airfields. It was deployed to Alaska in September 1947 where it flew airlift missions from Elmendorf Field during the winter of 1947–1948, returning to McChord Air Force Base in March 1948. In October 1949 it received the long-distance Douglas C-54 Skymaster.

On 1 June 1950, its parent 62d Troop Carrier Wing was inactivated, while the 62d Troop Carrier Group, less the 4th Troop Carrier Squadron moved for a short time to Kelly Air Force Base, Texas, returning in July. During the Korean War, the squadron flew long, over-water trans-Pacific missions to Japan from McChord. In 1951, it was upgraded to the new Douglas C-124 Globemaster II strategic airlifter. It moved to nearby Larson Air Force Base when McChord was taken over by Air Defense Command in 1952. From Larson, the squadron airlifted troops, blood plasma, aircraft parts, ammunition, medical supplies, and much more, primarily to Japan, in support of the Korean War until the armistice in June 1953. During the balance of the 1950s, the squadron supported the French forces in Indochina, transporting a replacement French garrison to Dien Bien Phu in 1954.

By 1955 the Cold War was well under way, and the North American Air Defense Command set out to build a chain of radar stations on the northernmost reaches of the continent. This chain of radars, known as the Distant Early Warning Line (DEW Line), was to detect incoming Soviet missiles and bombers, and give our forces enough warning to launch a counterattack, and get the National Command Authorities to safety. Between 1955 and 1957, the squadron began to fly missions to the Alaskan arctic regions, carrying 13 million pounds of supplies and equipment to build the DEW Line. The resupply of the DEW Line stations kept the squadron occupied until 1969. Its Globemasters also flew airlift missions in South Vietnam as the growing American commitment required more troops, supplies and equipment. In December 1969, the squadron was inactivated along with its C-124 Globemasters transferring its personnel to the other squadrons of the 62d MAW.

The 7th was reactivated just over a year later at Travis Air Force Base, California as part of the 60th Military Airlift Wing, and was equipped with Lockheed C-141 Starlifter jet transports. It was immediately put to use supporting the logistics missions of the Vietnam War, carrying personnel, equipment and supplies from the United States to South Vietnam, Thailand, the Philippines, Japan, and other bases in the Western Pacific. Then, after the 1973 Paris Peace Accords, a squadron C-141 returned the first 20 US Prisoners of War from Clark Air Base, Republic of The Philippines to Travis in Operation Homecoming. Over the next 6 weeks, 280 POWs were returned to Travis to be reunited with their families and to receive medical care.

During the fall of 1973, the squadron supported Operation Nickel Grass, the support of Israel during the Yom Kippur War in the Middle East. As Military Airlift Command (MAC)'s prime representative in this operation, the 7th flew C-141 missions to Israel and delivered over 22,000 tons of supplies and equipment.

To upgrade cargo carrying capacity, MAC initiated a major upgrade program for its C-141 fleet beginning in 1979. The project added an in-flight refueling system and 23 feet in length to the fuselage. The stretchedStarlifter was designated the C-141B. The squadron sent its first C-141A to the Lockheed Corporation for modification on 13 August 1979. It received its last "B" model on 10 May 1982.

In the 1980s and 1990s, the 7th provided humanitarian support after Hurricanes Hugo, Andrew, and Iniki; flood relief to Bangladesh and evacuation support after the eruption of Mount Pinatubo in the Philippines. In addition, the 7th provided critical airlift support during Operation Restore Hope in Somalia, as well as delivering thousands of tons of relief supplies to the former Soviet Union.

=== Modern era ===
In a 1993 realignment of assets as the C-141s at Travis were retiring, and the 60th was receiving former SAC McDonnell Douglas KC-10 Extender tankers, the squadron was transferred back to its previous unit, the 62d Airlift Wing at McChord AFB, Washington which consolidated Air Mobility Command's C-141 fleet.

At McChord, the 7th received its first McDonnell Douglas C-17 Globemaster III in 1998, and began to retire its C-141s. It maintained a Starlifter flight until 2002 as the new Globemaster IIIs were received. One of the squadron's many firsts was the landing the first C-17 on the ice sheet near McMurdo Station in Antarctica in 1999, and landing the first C-17 in North Korea a few weeks later.

Recently, the 7th Airlift Squadron helped man another expeditionary airlift squadron along with the 17th Airlift Squadron from Charleston Air Force Base. For the first time in history, two C-17 squadrons deployed to forward theater locations, supporting Operation Iraqi Freedom, Operation Enduring Freedom, and the Combined Joint Task Force - Horn of Africa. On 1 June 2006, the 816th Expeditionary Airlift Squadron was created from half of the 817th Expeditionary Airlift Squadron flying from "an undisclosed location in South West Asia". While the 817th Flies from Incirlik Airbase, Turkey and Manas Air Base, Kyrgyzstan. The 7th helped initiate the new 2 EAS concept in C-17 operations.

== Lineage ==
- Constituted as the 7th Transport Squadron on 1 October 1933

Activated on 14 October 1939
Redesignated 7th Troop Carrier Squadron on 4 July 1942
Inactivated on 27 November 1945

- Activated on 7 September 1946

Redesignated 7th Troop Carrier Squadron, Medium on 23 June 1948
Redesignated 7th Troop Carrier Squadron, Heavy on 12 October 1949
Redesignated 7th Air Transport Squadron, Heavy on 1 January 1965
Redesignated 7th Military Airlift Squadron on 8 January 1966
Inactivated on 22 December 1969

- Activated on 13 March 1971

Redesignated 7th Airlift Squadron on 1 November 1991.

=== Assignments ===
- 10th Transport Group, 14 October 1939
- 62d Transport Group (later 62d Troop Carrier Group), 11 December 1940 – 14 November 1945
- Unknown 15–27 Nov 1945
- 62d Troop Carrier Group, 7 September 1946 (attached to Yukon Sector, Alaskan Air Command, 15 September 1947 – 5 March 1948; 62d Troop Carrier Wing, after 8 January 1960)
- 62d Troop Carrier Wing (later 62d Air Transport wing, 62d Military Airlift Wing), 15 January 1960 – 22 December 1969
- 60th Military Airlift Wing, 13 March 1971
- 60th Military Airlift Group, 6 March 1978
- 60th Military Airlift Wing, 15 February 1979
- 60th Operations Group, 1 November 1991
- 62d Operations Group, 1 October 1993 – present

=== Stations ===
- Sacramento Air Depot (later McClellan Field), California, 14 October 1939
- Kellogg Field, Michigan, 29 May 1942
- Florence Army Airfield, South Carolina, 2 July-14 August 1942
- RAF Greenham Common, England, 7 September 1942
- RAF Keevil, England, 25 September-16 November 1942
- Tafaraoui Airfield, Algeria, 27 December 1942

Operated from bases in Egypt and Palestine, 13 March-19 May 1943

- Matemore Airfield, Algeria, 21 May 1943
- El Djem Airfield, Tunisia, 22 June 1943
- Goubrine Airfield, Tunisia, 26 July 1943
- Ponte Olivo Airfield, Sicily, 6 September 1943
- Brindisi Airfield, Italy, 12 February 1944
- Ponte Olivo Airfield, Sicily, 29 March 1944
- Guado Airfield, Italy, 8 May 1944
- Galera Airfield, Italy, 28 June 1944
- Brindisi Airfield, Italy, 22 October 1944
- Tarquinia Airfield, Italy, 4 December 1944
- Rosignano Airfield, Italy, 24 May 1945
- Naples Airport, Italy, 25 September-27 November 1945
- Bergstrom Field, Texas, 7 September 1946
- McChord Field (later McChord Air Force Base), Washington, 5 August 1947 (operated from Elmendorf Field, Alaska, 15 September 1947 – 5 March 1948)
- Kelly Air Fotce Base, Texas, 9 May 1950 (operated from McChord Air Force Base, Washington after 27 July 1950)
- McChord Air Force Base, Washington, 19 February 1951
- Larson Air Force Base, Washington, 9 May 1952
- McChord Air Force Base, Washington, 13 June 1960 – 22 December 1969
- Travis Air Force Base, California, 13 March 1971
- McChord Air Force Base, Washington, 1 October 1993 – present

=== Aircraft ===
- Douglas C-33 (1939–1941)
- Douglas C-39 (1939–1942)
- Martin B-10 (1939–1940)
- Douglas C-53 Skytrooper (1942)
- Douglas C-47 Skytrain (1942–1945)
- Curtiss C-46 Commando (1946–1947)
- Fairchild C-82 Packet (1947–1949)
- Douglas C-54 Skymaster (1949–1951)
- Douglas C-124 Globemaster II (1951–1969)
- Lockheed C-141 Starlifter (1971–2000)
- Boeing C-17 Globemaster III (1999 – present)
