= 4th Airlift Squadron =

4th Airlift Squadron

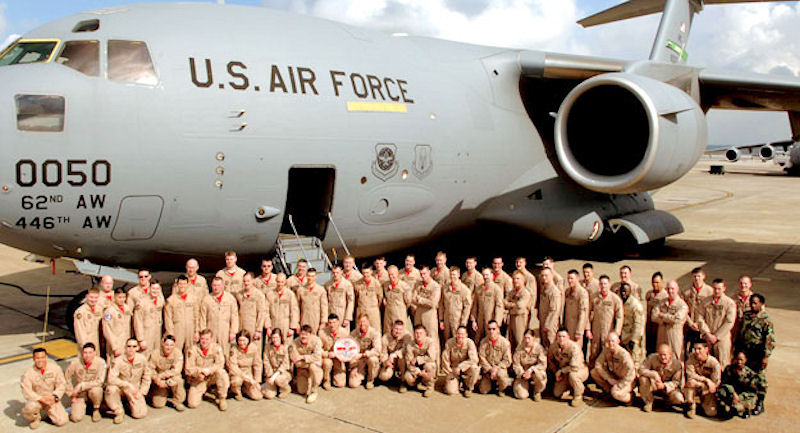
- Squadron airmen pose in front of a C-17A Globemaster III at Incirlik Air Base (Note: Aircraft is Boeing C-17A Globemaster III, serial 98-50. the airmen were finishing a 120-day deployment to Incirlik.)
- Active: 1935–1945; 1946–present
- Country: United States
- Branch: United States Air Force
- Role: Airlift
- Part of: Air Mobility Command
- Garrison/HQ: McChord Air Force Base, Washington
- Nickname: Fightin' Fourth
- Engagements: European-African-Middle East Campaign World War II: Tunisia; Sicily; Naples-Foggia; Rome-Arno; Southern France; North Apennines; Po Valley; India-Burma with Arrowhead; Korean War: Chinese Communist Forces Intervention; First UN Counteroffensive; CCF Spring Offensive; UN Summer-Fall Offensive; Armed Forces Expeditionary Streamer: Operation Just Cause (Panama), 1989–90

- Decorations: Distinguished Unit Citation Air Force Meritorious Unit Award Air Force Outstanding Unit Award (13x) Republic of Korea Presidential Unit Citation Republic of Vietnam Gallantry Cross with Palm

Insignia
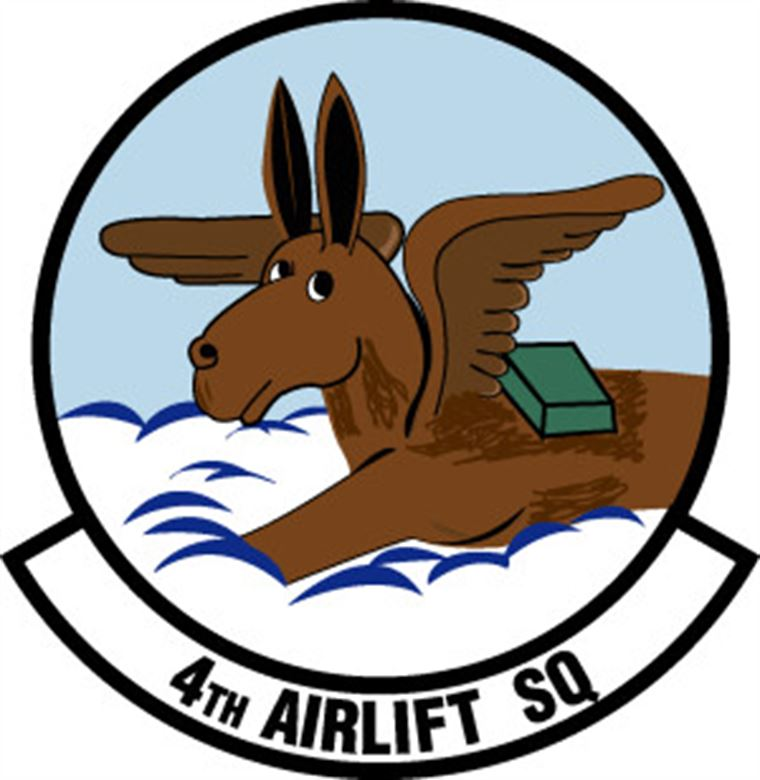
- 4th Airlift Squadron Emblem (approved 25 September 2007)

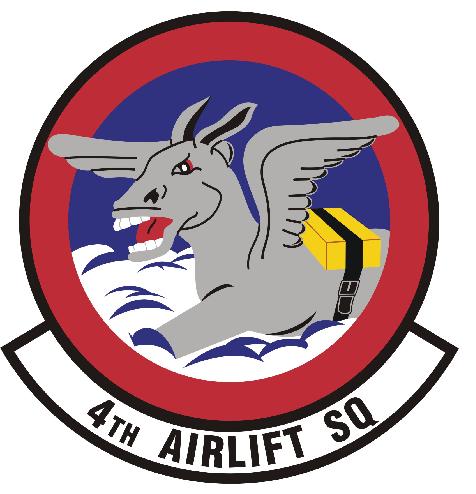
- 4th Airlift Squadron emblem (early) (Note: This variation was used by the squadron through several designations, but was apparently never approved. Compare Maurer, Combat Squadrons, pp. 31–32 with Endicott, pp. 345–346)

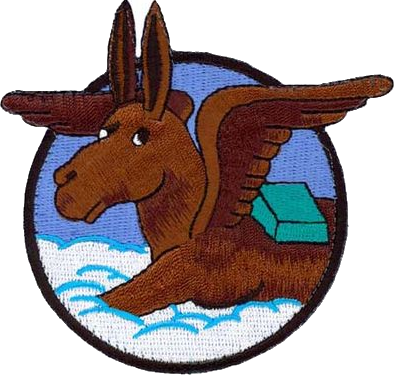
- Patch with 4th Troop Carrier Squadron emblem (approved 17 September 1942)

The 4th Airlift Squadron is part of the 62nd Airlift Wing at Joint Base Lewis-McChord, (McChord Air Force Base), Washington. It operates Boeing C-17 Globemaster III aircraft supporting the United States Air Force global reach mission worldwide.

== History ==
=== Origins ===
Prior to the early 1930s, transport aircraft in the Air Corps had been assigned to air depots and to service squadrons, although provisional transport squadrons had been formed for special projects. By 1932 Major Hugh J. Knerr, Chief of the Field Service Section of the Materiel Division, proposed the formation of a transport squadron at each air depot to act as a cadre for the transport wing the Air Corps proposed to support a field army in the event of mobilization. Major General Benjamin Foulois approved the formation of four provisional squadrons in November 1932.

The 4th Provisional Transport Squadron was constituted on 1 October 1933 and allotted to the Fifth Corps Area. It was organized with reserve personnel by March 1934 at Bowman Field, Kentucky as a Regular Army Inactive unit. (Note: Regular Army Inactive units were units that were constituted in the regular army. Although they were not activated, they were organized with reserve personnel during the 1920s and early 1930s. Even though they had reserve personnel assigned, they were not Organized Reserve units. Because they had no regular personnel they were still considered inactive in the regular army. Clay, p. vi)

In the spring of 1935, the provisional transport squadrons, including the 4th Transport Squadron at Rockwell Field, California, were activated with Bellanca C-27 Airbus aircraft assigned. The reserve officers of the unit were reassigned. With enlisted men as pilots, the squadron hauled engines, parts, and other equipment to airfields in the Rockwell Air Depot area, returned items to the depot, and transferred materiel between depots. It also furnished transportation for maneuvers. The rapid transport of supplies by the squadrons permitted the Air Corps to maintain low levels of materiel at its airfields, relying on replenishment from depot stocks only when needed.

In May 1937, the squadron was reassigned from the Rockwell Air Depot to the newly activated 10th Transport Group, which assumed command of all four active transport squadrons. The squadron received two-engine Douglas C-33s, the military version of the DC-2 in 1936 and Douglas C-39s (DC-2s with tail surfaces of the DC-3) in 1939 to replace the single engine Bellancas. These, and various other militarized DC-3s remained as the squadron's equipment until the entry of the United States into World War II. In 1938 when Rockwell Field was transferred to the United States Navy, the Rockwell Depot moved to Sacramento, California and the squadron continued its transport mission from McClellan Field.

=== World War II ===
After the Pearl Harbor Attack, the squadron was transferred to the 62d Transport Group and re-equipped with Douglas C-47 Skytrain transports. Initially transferred to Kellogg Field, Michigan for training, the squadron trained for combat resupply and casualty evacuation mission at several airfields during the spring and summer of 1942. Was ordered deployed to England, initially as part of Eighth Air Force in September 1942. It performed intratheater transport flights of personnel, supply and equipment within England during summer and fall of 1942. The squadron was reassigned to Twelfth Air Force after Operation Torch invasion of North Africa, initially stationed at Tafaraoui Airfield, Algeria.

In combat, performed resupply and evacuation missions across Morocco, Algeria and Tunisia during North African Campaign. During June 1943, the unit began training with gliders in preparation for Operation Husky, the invasion of Sicily. It towed gliders to Syracuse, Sicily and dropped paratroopers at Catania during the operation. After moving to Sicily, the squadron airdropped supplies to escaped prisoners of war in Northern Italy in October. I operated from Sicily until December until moving to Italian mainland.

The squadron supported the Italian Campaign during the balance of 1944 supporting partisans in the Balkans. Its unarmed aircraft flew at night over uncharted territory, landing at small unprepared airfields to provide guns, ammunition, clothing, medical supplies, gasoline, and mail to the partisans. It even carried jeeps and mules as cargo. On return trips it evacuated wounded partisans, evadees and escaped prisoners. During the spring of 1944, the squadron was transferred to Tenth Air Force in India where it carried combat cargo during the Siege of Myitkyina, Burma. Returning to the Mediterranean Theater of Operations in July 1944, it carried paratroopers during Operation Dragoon the invasion of Southern France in August 1944. The squadron then returned to operations over Italy and in the Balkans until end of combat in Europe, May 1945. In all the 4th earned nine campaign streamers during operations in both the European and China-Burma-India theaters in the Second World War. The squadron was inactivated at the end of 1945

=== Korean War ===
The squadron was reactivated September 1946, being assigned to the troop carrier squadron training school at Bergstrom Field, Texas. When the school closed in July 1947, it moved to McChord Field, Washington where its parent 62d Troop Carrier Wing became the host unit at the airfield. It conducted routine peacetime transport operations, training with Army units at Fort Lewis with simulated combat parachute training drops flying Curtiss C-46 Commandos and the new Fairchild C-82 Packet combat cargo aircraft, designed to operate from forward, rugged airfields.

With the outbreak of the Korean War in June 1950, the squadron deployed to Japan in December 1950 where it was attached to various Far East Air Forces (FEAF) units for the next year. The squadron was re-equipped with Douglas C-54 Skymaster 4-engine cargo aircraft where it flew combat resupply missions over the Korean peninsula, supporting United Nations ground forces with resupply and casualty evacuation flights from rough airfields to and from FEAF Japanese air bases. It also conducted trans-pacific aerial transportation from the United States. The squadron returned to McChord in November 1951.

=== Cold War ===
With its return from Korea, the squadron re-equipped with the new Douglas C-124 Globemaster II strategic airlifter. It moved to nearby Larson Air Force Base when McChord was taken over by Air Defense Command in 1952. From Larson, the squadron airlifted troops, blood plasma, aircraft parts, ammunition, medical supplies, and much more, primarily to Japan, in support of the Korean War until the armistice in June 1953. During the balance of the 1950s, the squadron supported the French forces in French Indochina, transporting a replacement French garrison to Dien Bien Phu in 1954. Operation Bali Hai saw the Globemasters fly around the world in a period of 8 to 10 days. The C-124s departed the desert of Moses Lake for Germany and France, where French troops were onloaded for a flight through Tunisia, Libya, Egypt, Saudi Arabia, Pakistan, Ceylon (now Sri Lanka), Thailand, and, finally, Vietnam, where the French joined their comrades in Indochina.

By 1955 the Cold War was well under way, and North American Air Defense Command set out to build a chain of radar stations on the northernmost reaches of the continent. This chain of radars, known as the Distant Early Warning Line (DEW Line), was to detect incoming Soviet missiles and bombers, and give our forces enough warning to launch a counterattack, and get the National Command Authorities to safety. Between 1955 and 1957, the squadron began to fly missions to the Alaskan arctic regions, carrying 13 million pounds of supplies and equipment to build the DEW Line. The resupply of the DEW Line stations kept the Wing occupied until 1969.

=== Vietnam War ===
In a realignment of assets, on 1 June 1960, the squadron's parent 62d Troop Carrier Wing moved back to McChord in June 1960. During the early 1960s, the squadron found itself back in Indochina by April 1962. At a time when overt American participation in the war in Vietnam was minimized, the squadron began carrying Army supplies and equipment from Dover Air Force Base, Delaware, to Saigon, South Vietnam. The next month, the squadron participated in Operation Spare Bed, airlifting an Army field hospital to a classified location in Thailand. During the 1960s the aircraft of the squadron found themselves almost continually supporting United States military missions in South Vietnam as the growing American commitment required more troops, supplies and equipment. The squadron was upgraded to the Lockheed C-141 Starlifter intercontinental jet transport in 1966 flying troops and supplies regularly to Tan Son Nhut, Cam Ranh Bay and Da Nang Air Bases in South Vietnam, as well as to Clark Air Base in the Philippines and Don Muang Airport in Thailand, among others.

With the ending of the United States involvement in the Vietnam War in the early 1970s, the squadron flew missions in support of Operation Homecoming, the return of our prisoners of war from Vietnam in early 1973. Missions were flown to Hanoi, North Vietnam to pick up the POWs and transport them to Clark Air Base. Subsequently, they were flown back to the United States, to return to their waiting families. In March 1975, with the fall of South Vietnam imminent, the squadron returned to Saigon one last time during Operation Babylift, which carried hundreds of Vietnamese orphans to the United States, where adoptive parents awaited their arrival.

=== Global airlift ===
During the 1970s, the squadron returned to a peacetime status, with routine flights around the world carrying personnel, equipment and supplies as needed. This was interrupted in 1978 following the mass murder-suicide of more than 900 people at the Jonestown religious compound in Guyana, South America. The squadron airlifted bodies to a morgue at Dover Air Force Base (most of the victims were U.S. citizens). Crew members reported using their oxygen masks during the flight, in an effort to stifle the stench of decaying bodies in the cargo compartment.

In 1980, the squadron began to exchange its C-141A Starlifters for newer, "stretched" C-141B models. This new version of the aircraft increased its cargo carrying capacity by inserting two fuselage plugs, one forward, one aft of the wings, totaling just over 23 feet in length. Also of note in the B series, an air refueling receptacle, lending yet longer range to the C-141. Beginning in June 1983, the squadron took full advantage of the longer, air-refuelable C-141B to carry out the perilous mid-winter (June is the beginning of winter in the Southern Hemisphere) airdrop over Antarctica. Air refueling made possible the trip from Christchurch, New Zealand, to the South Pole and back.

In August 1990, Iraq invaded Kuwait, on the shores of the Persian Gulf. Within days the squadron began flying missions to the Middle East as part of Operation Desert Shield, the effort to deter further aggression from Iraq. The operations tempo was unprecedented. By January 1991, Desert Shield became Desert Storm, as allied air power was unleashed upon the invaders. The squadron joined the rest of Military Airlift Command in providing round-the-clock airlift to the Middle East, keeping the air war supplied, and aiding the buildup of ground forces for the highly successful, though brief, ground war in February. Before long, Kuwait was free, although the effort put forth by the squadron had accelerated the aging process of its C-141s. The increased payloads and almost incessant flying would have lasting negative effects on the fleet.

In early 1992, squadron crews and aircraft began participating in Operation Provide Hope, helping to deliver hundreds of tons of food and medicine to the former Soviet Union. By August, Operation Provide Relief (later known as Operation Restore Hope), rushing food supplies to the starving people of Somalia, the relief of victims of Hurricane Andrew in our own country, and relief efforts for the Guamanian victims of Typhoon Omar kept its crews and aircraft on the move.

In late 1995, President Bill Clinton ordered the deployment of 20,000 U.S. troops to the former Yugoslav Republic of Bosnia, as part of a multinational peacekeeping force. Squadron aircraft deployed to Rhein-Main Air Base, Germany, by 18 December, ready to do their part. In spite of severe weather conditions, crews and aircraft were soon flying troops and equipment into Taszar Air Base, Hungary, for Operation Joint Endeavor. In January 1996 the squadron, operating under a provisional wing located at Rhein-Main Air Base Germany, continued supporting airlift missions into Tuzla and Sarajevo, Bosnia-Herzegovina. and Taszar in support of Operation Joint Endeavor. In April 1996, the squadron provided equipment and personnel transportation in support of an Air Expeditionary Force in the middle eastern Kingdom of Jordan as part of Operation Southern Watch.

On the night of 15 May 1996, aircrews took part in Big Drop III, the largest airdrop since World War II. The squadron helped deploy members of the Army 82d Airborne Division, U.K. 5th Airborne Brigade personnel, and their heavy equipment onto three drop zones on Fort Bragg, North Carolina. A humanitarian mission included the deliverance of relief supplies from Kadena Air Base, Japan to Ho Chi Minh City, Vietnam after Typhoon Linda devastated the area in early November 1997. The typhoon unleashed torrential rains and winds that wiped out coastal villages, killed hundreds of people and left thousands homeless.

In 2000, the squadron retired its C-141 Starlifters for the new McDonnell Douglas C-17 Globemaster III airlifter. In a response to the terrorist attacks against America on 11 September 2001, President George W. Bush initiated war against terrorism named Operation Infinite Justice, later renamed Operation Enduring Freedom. The squadron supported these efforts by airlifting troops and supplies destined for Afghanistan. It also flew humanitarian airdrops that hundreds of thousands of the rations for starving Afghans. Flights in support of Coalition efforts in Afghanistan continue to the present day.

In January 2003 additional personnel and aircraft deployed to locations all around the world in support airlift operations. By the end of January all aircraft supporting this effort would fly their missions from Charleston Air Force Base, South Carolina, the only East Coast C-17 Base. Similar C-17 stage operations had been operating into Afghanistan from a base in Germany. After repeated noncompliance with UN demands Operation Iraqi Freedom began. "On my orders, coalition forces have begun striking selected targets of military importance to undermine Saddam Hussein's ability to wage war," President Bush stated in an address to the nation. During the war squadron personnel would be in the thick of the fight. Under the cover of darkness at a forward operating location at Aviano Air Base, Italy on 26 March 2003, squadron aircraft flew into the hostile skies of Northern Iraq. The nine-hour mission, covering distance roughly the equivalent of Seattle to St. Louis, delivered members of the Army's 173rd Airborne Brigade into an area north of Baghdad. This mission, the largest combat airdrop since the invasion of Panama in December 1989 in Operation Just Cause, was the first combat insertion of paratroopers using C-17s. Operations in support of Operation Iraqi Freedom continued until the United States withdraw from Iraq at the end of 2011.

== Lineage ==
- Constituted as the 4th Provisional Transport Squadron on 1 March 1935

Redesignated 4th Transport Squadron on 25 June 1935
Activated on 8 July 1935
Redesignated 4th Troop Carrier Squadron on 4 July 1942
Inactivated on 13 December 1945

- Activated on 7 September 1946

Redesignated 4th Troop Carrier Squadron, Medium on 23 June 1948
Redesignated 4th Troop Carrier Squadron, Heavy on 12 October 1949
Redesignated 4th Air Transport Squadron, Heavy on 8 July 1962
Redesignated 4th Military Airlift Squadron on 8 January 1966
Redesignated 4th Airlift Squadron on 1 December 1991.

=== Assignments ===
- Rockwell Air Depot, 8 July 1935
- 10th Transport Group, 20 May 1937
- 62d Transport Group (later 62d Troop Carrier Group), 10 May 1941 (attached to 64th Troop Carrier Group, 3 April–19 June 1944)
- Unknown, 14 November–13 December 1945
- 62d Troop Carrier Group, 7 September 1946 (attached to 374th Troop Carrier Wing, 1 December 1950; 6122d Air Base Group, 25 December 1950; 315th Air Division, 25 January 1951; Far East Air Forces, 1 October–7 November 1951)
- 62d Troop Carrier Wing (later 62d Air Transport Wing, 62d Military Airlift Wing), 15 January 1960
- 62d Operations Group, 1 December 1991 – present

=== Stations ===
- Rockwell Field, California, 8 July 1935
- Sacramento Air Depot (later McClellan Field), California, 1 December 1938
- Kellogg Field, Michigan, 29 May 1942
- Florence Army Airfield, South Carolina, 1 July–14 August 1942
- RAF Keevil, England, 25 September 1942
- Tafaraoui Airfield, Algeria, 15 November 1942
- Casablanca–Anfa Airport, French Morocco, 16 December 1942
- Nouvion Airfield, Algeria, 29 March 1943
- Matemore Airfield, Algeria, 18 May 1943
- Goubrine Airfield, Tunisia, 25 June 1943
- Gela Airfield, Sicily, Italy, 7 September 1943
- Catania-Fontanarossa Airport, Sicily, Italy, 18 October 1943
- Ponte Olivo Airfield, Sicily, Italy, 27 February 1944

Operated from bases in India, 12 April–11 June 1944

- Gaudo Airfield, Italy, 8 May 1944
- Galera Airfield, Italy, 29 June 1944
- Malignano Airfield, Italy, 3 October 1944
- Tarquinia Airfield, Italy, 9 January 1945
- Rosignano Airfield, Italy, 26 May 1945
- Marcianise Airfield, Italy, 28 September 1945
- Naples Airport, Italy, c. Oct-13 Dec 1945
- Bergstrom Field, Texas, 7 September 1946
- McChord Field (later McChord Air Force Base), Washington, 20 July 1947 – 28 November 1950
- Ashiya Air Base, Japan, 1 December 1950
- Tachikawa Air Base, Japan, 25 July–16 November 1951
- McChord Air Force Base, Washington, 16 November 1951
- Larson Air Force Base, Washington, 11 May 1952
- McChord Air Force Base, Washington, 13 June 1960 – present

=== Aircraft ===
- Bellanca C-27 Airbus (1935–1937)
- Douglas C-33 (1936–1941)
- Douglas C-39 (1938–1942)
- Douglas C-47 Skytrain (1942–1945)
- Curtiss C-46 Commando (1946–1947)
- Fairchild C-82 Packet (1947–1949)
- Douglas C-54 Skymaster (1949–1951)
- Douglas C-124 Globemaster II (1951–1969)
- Lockheed C-141 Starlifter (1966–2002)
- Boeing C-17 Globemaster III (2000 – present)
