= 62nd Operations Group =

62d Operations Group

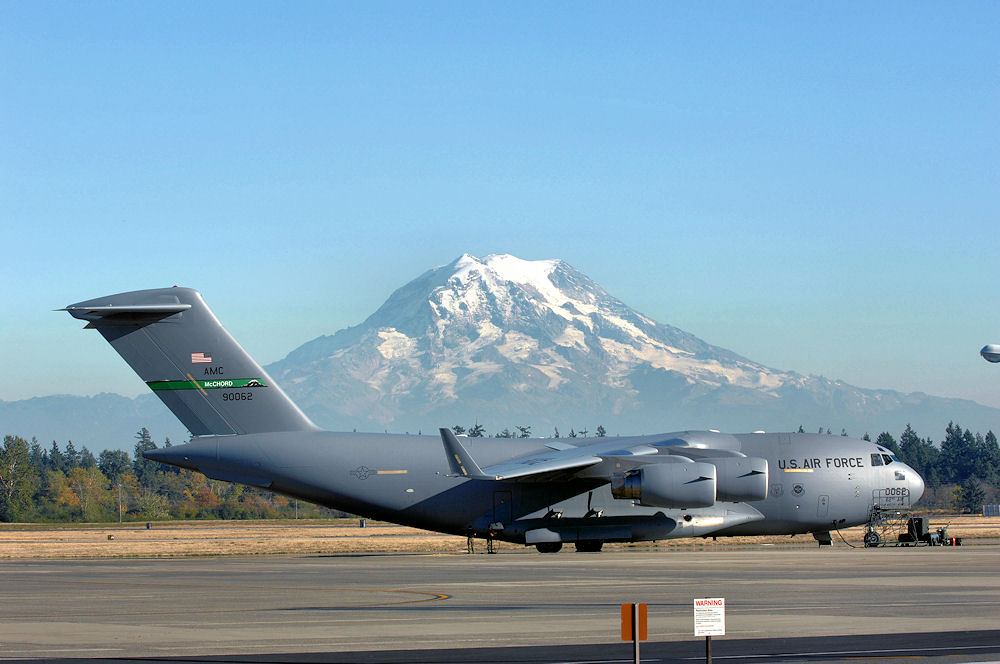
- C-17 Globemaster III taxiing at McChord AFB (Note: Aircraft is Boeing C-17A Lot XI Globemaster III, serial 99-0062 Spirit of the Hump.)
- Active: 1940–1945; 1946–1960; 1991–present
- Country: United States
- Branch: United States Air Force
- Type: Airlift
- Part of: 62d Airlift Wing
- Garrison/HQ: McChord Air Force Base, Washington
- Engagements: European-African-Middle East Campaign World War II: Tunisia; Sicily; Naples-Foggia; Rome-Arno; Southern France; North Apennines; Po Valley

- Decorations: Meritorious Unit Award Air Force Outstanding Unit Award (6x)

Insignia
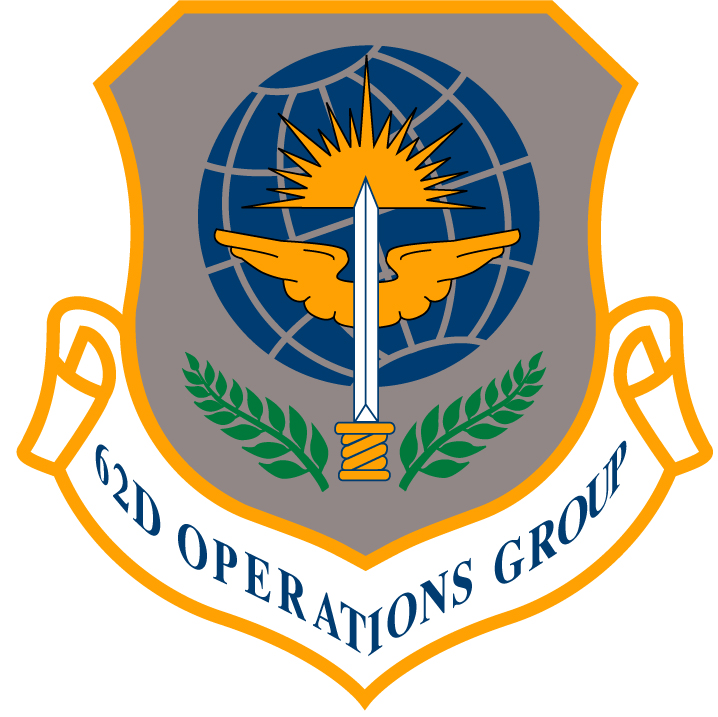
- 62d Operations Group Emblem (Note: While assigned to the 62nd Wing, the group uses the wing emblem with the group designation on the scroll. AF Instruction 84-105, Organizational Lineage, Honors and History, 27 April 2017, paragraph 3.3.3.)

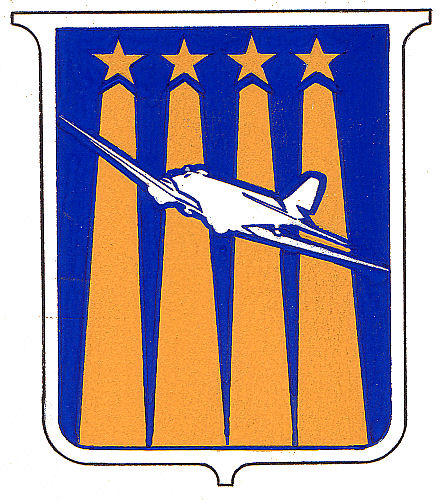
- 62nd Troop Carrier Group emblem

The 62d Operations Group is a United States Air Force unit assigned to the 62d Airlift Wing. It is stationed at McChord Air Force Base, Joint Base Lewis-McChord, Washington.

Established prior to World War II, its predecessor unit, the 62d Transport Group (later 62d Troop Carrier Group) engaged in combat operations, first with the Eighth Air Force and primarily with Twelfth Air Force during the war.

== Mission ==
The 62d Operations Group is the flying component of the 62nd Wing. The group provides a large part of Air Mobility Command's Global Reach airlift capability. This adaptable and reactive air mobility promotes stability in regions by keeping America's competency and character highly visible. The group's tasking requirements range from supplying humanitarian airlift relief to victims of disasters, to airdropping troops into the heart of contingency operations in hostile areas.

== History ==
=== World War II ===
First constituted as the 62d Transport Group on 20 November 1940, the Group activated on 11 December at McClellan Field, California, bringing together three of the oldest, most experienced airlift squadrons in history. The 7th and 8th Transport Squadrons, constituted on 1 October 1933, and the 4th Transport Squadron on 1 March 1935 existed only on paper until the 4th was activated on 8 July 1935, the 7th on 14 October 1939, and the 8th on 1 February 1940.

Redesignated 62d Troop Carrier Group in July 1942. After intensive training for the Atlantic crossing, the redesignated group, now composed of the 4th, 7th, 8th, and 51st Troop Carrier Squadrons, arrived at its temporary home, RAF Keevil, England, on 3 October 1942 (their support personnel followed, arriving in country via the luxury ocean liner RMS Queen Elizabeth and assigned to VIII Air Support Command for further training.

Reassigned to Twelfth Air Force, it moved to North Africa on 15 November 1942 to support Allied ground forces in the campaign to wrest Tunisia from Axis control. After resupplying troops for a couple of weeks, the 62d got its first taste of combat when, on 29 November 1942, it joined the 64th Troop Carrier Group for a combat airdrop of 530 British airborne troops on German held airfields at Depienne, Pont-du-Fahs, and Oudna, Tunisia in an unsuccessful attempt to capture Tunis when German resistance to the advance of the British First Army appeared to be crumbling.

Trained with gliders for several months, then towed gliders to Syracuse, Sicily and also dropped paratroops behind enemy lines at Catania during the Allied invasion of Sicily. On the night of 9 July 1943, a total of 51 Douglas C-47 Skytrains and C-53 Skytroopers towed the first of these gliders into combat over Sicily. Their key objective was to capture a bridge south of Syracuse, and keep it open for use by allied forces. It took the huge formation 40 minutes to take off. They flew 500 feet above the Mediterranean Sea, at 120 miles per hour. An unforeseen headwind sent some group planes off course, whereby some gliders were released up to 30 minutes late. Battling against bad weather, darkness, friendly naval fire, flak, and inexperience, the 62d crews did their best to keep their gliders on target. In the end, 36 gliders went down at sea, 12 made land, 2 were unaccounted for, and 2 never cast off over their landing zones.

Operated from bases in Sicily and Italy from September 1943 until after the war. Dropped paratroops in northern Italy in June 1944 to harass the retreating enemy and to prevent the Germans from destroying bridges over which their forces had withdrawn. Flew two missions in connection with the invasion of Southern France in August 1944, releasing gliders and paratroops in the battle area. Transported paratroops and towed gliders to Greece during the Allied assault in October 1944. In addition to the airborne operations, the group transported men and supplies in the Mediterranean theater and to the front lines during the campaigns for Tunisia, Italy, and southern France. Also evacuated wounded personnel and flew missions behind enemy lines in Italy and the Balkans to haul guns, ammunition, food, clothing, medical supplies, and other materials to the partisans and to drop propaganda leaflets. Aided in the redeployment of personnel after the war and also hauled freight and mail.

After the end of the war in Europe, in May 1945, the 62nd shuttled troops, supplies, wounded, and prisoners in the Mediterranean area. Inactivated in Italy on 14 November 1945.

=== Cold War ===
On 7 September 1946, the 62nd Group, minus the 51st TCS, was activatedat Bergstrom Field, Texas. The group flew the Curtiss C-46 Commando, which was quickly replaced by the Fairchild C-82 Packet. In April 1947, in what would be the first of many humanitarian and disaster relief missions, the 62d flew to aid victims of an explosion in Texas City, Texas.

On 16 June 1947, the Group moved to McChord Field, Washington. Under the new Wing Base organization system wing headquarters were establish to command tactical groups and their supporting elements. Thus, the 62d Troop Carrier Wing was activated at McChord on 15 August 1947, assigned to Twelfth Air Force of Tactical Air Command while the 62d Troop Carrier Group became its flying arm.

After overcoming shortages of personnel and aircraft parts, the 62d began flying in earnest in January 1948 during Project Yukon. One infantry company with full field equipment was airlifted from McChord to Big Delta, Alaska. From Big Delta, the 62d's C-82s flew to Elmendorf Field, Alaska, for the return of another Army unit to McChord. A relatively simple task today, such deployments and redeployments were quite a feat then, as the piston-engine-powered C-82s required numerous stops for refueling.

During the first half of 1948, the 62d flew flood relief supplies to several locations in Washington and Oregon. McChord crews flew 100 tons of burlap bags, later to be filled with sand, to flood workers. By Fall, 62d assets were tapped to support the Berlin Airlift. More than 100 men, primarily mechanics, flight engineers, and truck drivers were identified for a 90-day temporary tour of duty in Europe, to bolster airlift resources.

In the unusually cruel winter of 1948–49, the 62d attracted national attention as it airdropped tons of hay to livestock stranded by extreme blizzards in several western States. Operation Hayride brought all available 62d assets to Naval Air Station Fallon, Nevada. From there the 62nd reached cattle in Nevada, Arizona, Utah, Colorado, Wyoming, Kansas, and Nebraska. With the operation well under way, President Truman called in additional C-82s from other units to assist in the endeavor. In the end, as much as 80 percent of the livestock in these states were saved as a result of the airdrop.

On 6 October 1949, the 62nd received its first four-engine Douglas C-54 Skymaster transport. By Thanksgiving of that same year, the wing was equipped entirely with C-54s, and its designation was changed from 62d Troop Carrier Wing, Medium to , Heavy. On 1 June 1950, the wing was inactivated. The group, together with the 7th and 8th Troop Carrier Squadrons, moved for a short time to Kelly Air Force Base, Texas, while the 4th was temporarily transferred to Japan. On 17 September 1951, the wing was once again activated at McChord. Shortly thereafter, the group and its three flying squadrons, again assigned to the Wing, returned to McChord. Not two years had passed, however, before the wing was once again on the move. Now flying the Douglas C-124 Globemaster II, which the 62nd had just proven as a viable platform for live paratroop drops, the Wing took command of Larson Air Force Base in central Washington, on 1 April 1952.

On 20 December 1952, one of the 62d's C-124s took off from Larson on a routine airlift mission. Immediately after takeoff, about one half-mile from the runway, the Globemaster II crashed and burned, killing 87, including servicemen on leave, going home for the holidays. At the time, it was the worst air disaster in history.

During 1952 and 1953, the 62d airlifted troops, blood plasma, aircraft parts, ammunition, medical supplies, and much more, to the Far East, in support of the Korean War. In May 1953, the 7th Squadron, using only 11 C-124s, set a new standard in airdrop, delivering simultaneously 1,008 men, and equipment of the 82d Airborne Division at Fort Bragg, North Carolina.

In April 1954, the 62d transported a replacement French garrison to Dien Bien Phu, French Indochina. Operation Bali Hai saw the Globemasters fly around the world in a period of 8 to 10 days. The C-124s departed Larson for Germany and France, where French troops were onloaded for a flight through Tunisia, Libya, Egypt, Saudi Arabia, Pakistan, Ceylon (now Sri Lanka), Thailand, and, finally, French indochina, where the French joined their comrades in the defense of Dien Bien Phu. Not longer after the second and final wave of Globemasters had delivered their French troops, the aircrews learned Dien Bien Phu had fallen to the communists. The mission of the 62d, however, was complete, and they flew eastward, through the Philippines, Japan, Guam, Kwajelein, Hawaii, and California, before reaching Larson again.

By 1955 the Cold War was well under way, and the North American Air Defense Command set out to build a chain of radar stations on the northernmost reaches of the continent. This chain of radars, known as the Distant Early Warning Line (Dew Line), was to detect incoming Soviet missiles and bombers, and give the U.S. forces enough warning to launch a counterattack, and get the National Command Authorities to safety. Between 1955 and 1957, the 62nd began to fly missions to the Alaskan arctic regions, carrying 13 million pounds of supplies and equipment to build the DEW Line. The resupply of the DEW Line stations kept the Wing occupied until 1969.

The 62d Troop Carrier Wing joined the Continental Division of the Military Air Transport Service (MATS) on 1 July 1957. On 31 December 1959, the wing relinquished command of Larson and MATS turned the base over to Strategic Air Command. Meanwhile, the Air Force reorganized the structure of its wings, and the 62d Troop Carrier Group was inactivated 8 January 1960 when squadrons were assigned directly to the wing as part of the Air Force dual deputy reorganization.

=== From 1991 ===
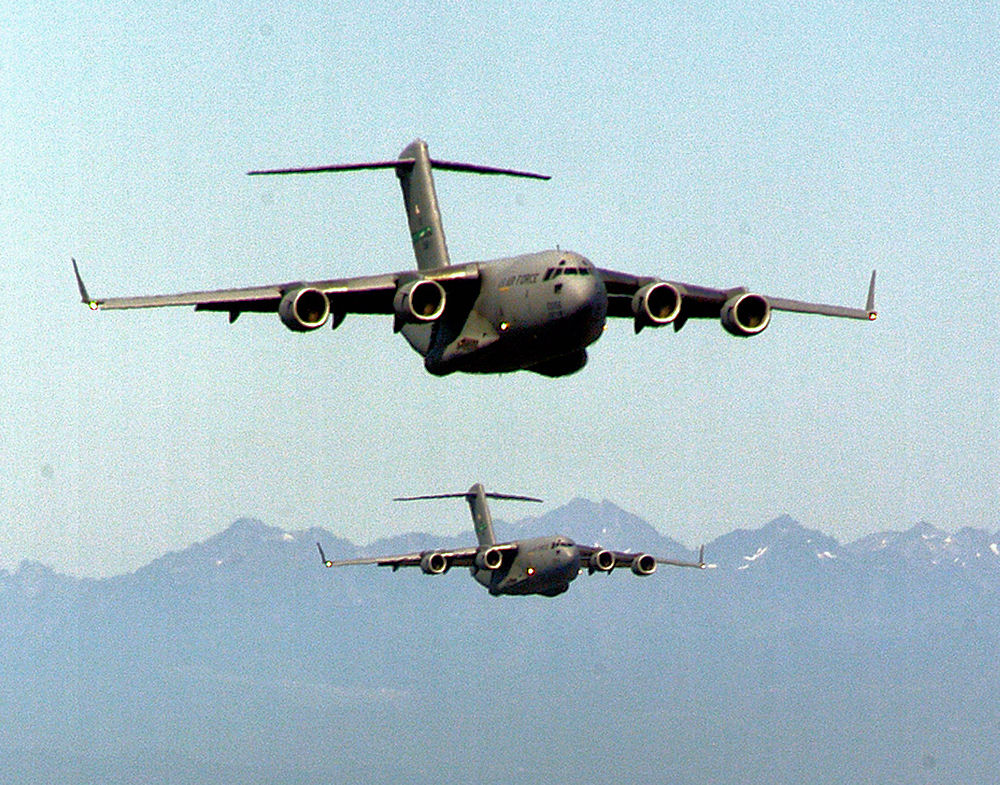
C-17s preparing to land at McChord AFB

From 1991, its squadrons flew a variety of exercises and training missions and provided airlift for worldwide contingencies and humanitarian relief efforts. Flew resupply missions for Operation Deep Freeze, Antarctica, 1997–. Group elements conducted aerial delivery of rations to Afghan towns and villages during Global War on Terrorism contingency operations in 2001.

By the time Operation Iraqi Freedom was launched in mid-March 2003, nearly 1,000 McChord Airmen were heavily involved in defending America. At the end of March, McChord's C-17s and aircrews made history when they nighttime airdropped 1,000 "Sky Soldiers" from the 173d Airborne Brigade behind enemy lines into Northern Iraq. It was the largest combat airdrop since the invasion of Panama in December 1989 and a first for the C-17.

In 2005, McChord Airmen assisted in bringing relief to the victims of Hurricane Katrina. McChord brought over 135,000 pounds of food and water into the region and brought more than 1,000 residents of the area out to safety.

Aircrew from the 62d also participated in the largest noncombatant evacuation operation since Vietnam. In July 2006, they moved 12,703 U.S. citizens from Cyprus and Turkey where they had previously fled to escape fighting in Lebanon. In addition to aiding in the evacuation of people, McChord's Airmen delivered food, water and equipment to Cyprus to support stranded citizens awaiting evacuation.

In December 2006, a C-17 from McChord made its debut airdrop to the South Pole, Antarctica, showcasing the aircraft's reliability and versatility.

Finally, on 18 December 2007, the Air Force marked the 104th anniversary of powered flight with the first transcontinental flight of an aircraft using a blend of regular aviation and synthetic fuel. The transcontinental flight followed other successful synthetic fuel tests in C-17s and paved the way to certify the fuel blend for all C-17s.

Today the flying squadrons of the 62d Operations Group all fly the C-17 Globemaster III, with "McChord" in white on a green tail flash. They are among the oldest airlift squadrons in the Air Force:

- 4th Airlift Squadron, "Fighting Fourth", Established 1 March 1935
- 7th Airlift Squadron, "Willing and Able", Established 1 October 1933
- 8th Airlift Squadron, "Soaring Stallions", Established 1 October 1933
- 10th Airlift Squadron, "Pathfinders", Established 1 January 1938

== Lineage ==
- Established as the 62d Transport Group on 20 November 1940

Activated on 11 December 1940
Redesignated 62d Troop Carrier Group on 4 July 1942
Inactivated on 14 November 1945

- Activated on 7 September 1946

Redesignated: 62d Troop Carrier Group, Medium on 23 June 1948
Redesignated: 62d Troop Carrier Group, Heavy on 12 October 1949
Inactivated on 15 January 1960

- Redesignated: 62d Military Airlift Group on 31 July 1985 (Remained inactive)
- Redesignated: 62d Operations Group on 1 December 1991

Activated on 1 December 1991

=== Assignments ===
- Air Transport Command (later I Troop Carrier Command), 11 December 1940
- 50th Transport Wing, 14 January 1941
- 51st Transoirt Wing (later 51st Troop Carrier Wing), 1 June 1942
- Mediterranean Air Transport Service, 4 June-14 November 1945
- Third Air Force, 7 September 1946
- Ninth Air Force, 1 November 1946
- Twelfth Air Force, 5 August 1947
- 62d Troop Carrier Wing, 15 August 1947
- Fourth Air Force, 1 June 1950
- Fourteenth Air Force, 1 July 1950
- Continental Division, MATS, 17 July 1950
- 1705 Air Transport Wing, 24 August 1950
- 62d Troop Carrier Wing, 1 October 1951 – 15 January 1960
- 62d Airlift Wing, 1 December 1991–present

=== Components ===
- 4th Transport Squadron (later 4th Troop Carrier Squadron, 4th Airlift Squadron): 11 December 1940 – 14 November 1945; 7 September 1946 – 15 January 1960; 1 December 1991–present
- 7th Transport Squadron (later 7th Troop Carrier Squadron, 7th Airlift Squadron): 11 December 1940 – 14 November 1945; 7 September 1946 – 15 January 1960; 1 October 1993–present
- 8th Transport Squadron (later 8th Troop Carrier Squadron, 8th Airlift Squadron): 11 December 1940 – 14 November 1945; 7 September 1946 – 15 January 1960; 1 December 1991–present
- 10th Airlift Squadron, 1 October 2003–present
- 36th Airlift Squadron: 1 December 1991 – 1 October 1993
- 51st Transport Squadron (later 51st Troop Carrier Squadron): 1 June 1942 – 14 November 1945
- 62d Operations Support Squadron, 1 December 1991 – present

=== Stations ===
- McClellan Field, California, 11 December 1940
- Kellogg Field, Michigan, 30 May 1942
- Florence Army Air Field, South Carolina, 1 July-14 August 1942
- RAF Keevil (AAF-471), England, 25 September 1942
- Tafaraoui Airfield, Algeria, 15 November 1942
- Nouvion Airfield, Algeria, 24 December 1942
- Matemore Airfield, Algeria, 16 May 1943
- Tunisia, July 1943
- Ponte Olivo Airfield, Sicily, 6 September 1943
- Brindisi Airfield, Italy, February 1944
- Ponte Olivo Airfield, Sicily, 20 March 1944
- Gaudo Airfield, Italy, 8 May 1944
- Galera Airfield, Italy, 30 June 1944
- Malignano Airfield, Italy, 30 September 1944
- Tarquinia Airfield, Italy, 8 January 1945
- Rosignano Airfield, Italy, 25 May 1945
- Capodichino Airport, Naples, Italy, c.17 September-14 November 1945
- Bergstrom Field, Texas, 7 September 1946
- McChord Field, Washington (later McChord Air Force Base), August 1947
- Kelly Air Force Base, Texas, 9 May 1950
- McChord Air Force Base, Washington, 27 July 1950
- Larson Air Force Base, Washington, 9 May 1952 – 15 January 1960
- McChord Air Force Base, Washington, 1 December 1991–present

=== Aircraft ===
- Douglas C-39, 1941–1942
- Douglas C-47 Skytrain, 1942–1945
- Douglas C-53 Skytrooper, 1940–1945
- Curtiss C-46 Commando, 1946–1947
- Fairchild C-82 Packet, 1947–1949
- Douglas C-54 Skymaster, 1949–1951
- Douglas C-124 Globemaster II, 1951–1960
- Lockheed C-141 Starlifter, 1991–2002
- Boeing C-17 Globemaster III, 1999–present
