= Taszár =

- Village
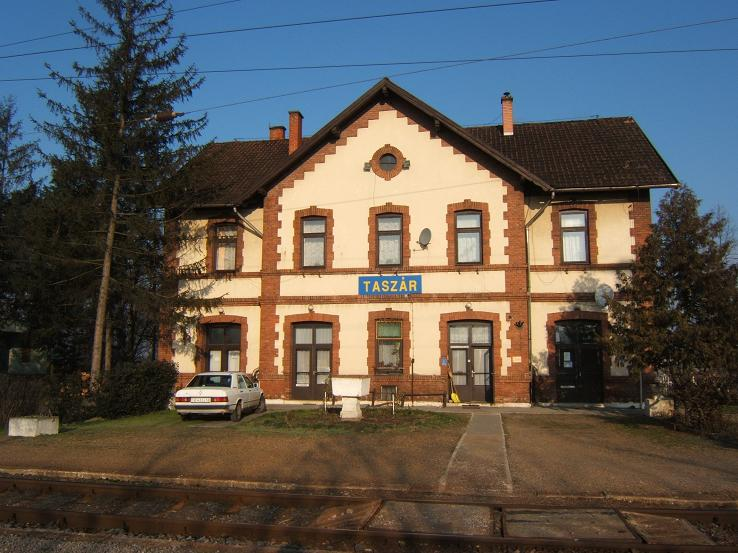
- Train station of Taszár

- Coat of arms

- Location of Somogy county in Hungary

- Location of Taszár
- Coordinates: 46.37616°N 17.90581°E
- Country: Hungary
- Region: Southern Transdanubia
- County: Somogy
- District: Kaposvár
- RC Diocese: Kaposvár

Area
  - Total: 17.29 km^{2} (6.68 sq mi)

Population (2017)
  - Total: 1,903
  - Density: 110.1/km^{2} (285.1/sq mi)
- Demonym: taszári
- Time zone: UTC+1 (CET)
  - Summer (DST): UTC+2 (CEST)
- Postal code: 7261
- Area code: (+36) 82
- NUTS 3 code: HU232
- MP: Mihály Witzmann (Fidesz)
- Website: Taszár Online

Taszár is a village in Somogy county, Hungary. The Taszár Air Base is located here.

== Etymology ==
The name comes from Slavic tesar (a carpenter), see e.g. Tesáre or Tesáre nad Žitavou. Tazar (1358).

== History and infrastructure ==
The village structure of the traditional Hungarian village was radically changed in the 1950s when they built the military air base². The military objects occupy a significant part of the town. This is particularly the inclusion of the airport and the barracks. The houses in the village were built at the airport and the barracks of soldiers were 2-3 storey, mostly flat-roofed buildings.

In 1995 the village were target of international and domestic interest. The Taszár Air Base became the logistical base of IFOR and later SFOR troops. In 2003 the Taszár Air Base took part in the training of the Iraqi volunteers.

Taszár has sealed roads and pavements. 300 children are studying in the primary school which has a modern language laboratory and a computer room to help students and the work of the teachers. The village's medical center has modern medical and dental equipment.

There's a closed-loop 18-channel cable TV system in the village. 98% of the village's houses is able to watch the local information broadcast. Since 2002 the village has information office, whose services cover the field of the village's agricultural and industrial entrepreneurs. There are ability for both the youth and the older people to gain access to the Internet in purpose of getting information online.
