= RAF Keevil =

Former Royal Air Force station in Wiltshire, England

RAF Keevil
- Near Keevil, Wiltshire in England
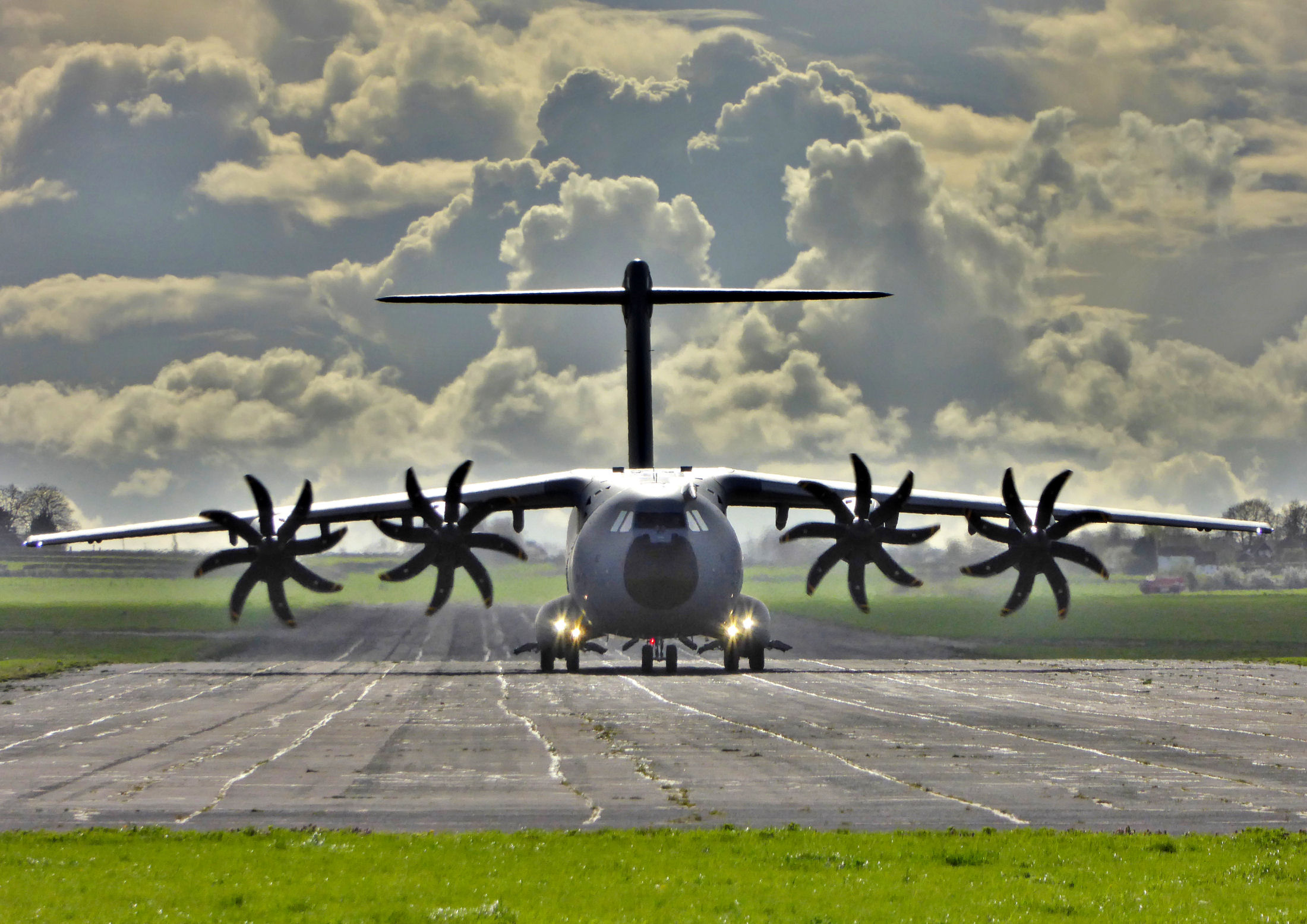
- An RAF Airbus A400M Atlas at Keevil during Exercise Joint Warrior in March 2017

Site information
- Type: Royal Air Force station parent station 1942-45
- Code: KV
- Owner: Ministry of Defence
- Operator: Royal Air Force
- Controlled by: RAF Fighter Command * No. 38 Group RAF; RAF Army Cooperation Command * No. 70 (AC) Group RAF; RAF Flying Training Command * No. 23 Group RAF; Ninth Air Force

Location
- Location in Wiltshire RAF Keevil (the United Kingdom)
- Coordinates: 51°18′46″N 002°06′47″W
- Area: 237 hectares

Site history
- Built: 1941/42
- In use: July 1942 – 1965
- Fate: Retained in military use as an unmanned airfield for training purposes, predominantly used by aircraft from RAF Brize Norton and Joint Aviation Command.

Airfield information
- Elevation: 57 metres (187 ft) AMSL
Runways
Direction	Length and surface
06/24	Asphalt

Royal Air Force Keevil or more simply RAF Keevil is a former Royal Air Force station, now controlled by the Army Air Corps. It lies between the villages of Keevil and Steeple Ashton, about 4 miles (6.4 km) east of the town of Trowbridge, in Wiltshire, England.

The airfield was built on a site previously earmarked for the purpose in the mid-1930s. With three long concrete runways, the airfield was used by the Royal Air Force and the United States Army Air Forces Eighth and Ninth Air Forces.

Although no longer an RAF station and now known as Keevil Airfield, it is maintained for military use and used for training purposes, predominantly by aircraft from RAF Brize Norton and Joint Aviation Command.

== History ==
=== Spitfire assembly ===
After air raids in 1940 on the Supermarine Spitfire production plants near Southampton, the Trowbridge area was one of several chosen for dispersal of production. At first parts were made, and later complete aircraft after completion of a purpose-built factory at Bradley Road, Trowbridge. Fuselages and wings were taken on Queen Mary trailers to an assembly shed on the edge of the airfield near Steeple Ashton village, then flown out by the Air Transport Auxiliary.

=== USAAF use ===
In 1942 Keevil airfield was provided to the USAAF and was assigned USAAF designation 471 (KV).

==== 62nd Troop Carrier Group ====
The first American unit assigned to Keevil was the 62nd Troop Carrier Group, arriving at Keevil on 6 September 1942 from Florence AAF, South Carolina. The group consisted of the following operational squadrons:

- 4th Troop Carrier Squadron
- 7th Troop Carrier Squadron
- 8th Troop Carrier Squadron
- 51st Troop Carrier Squadron

The group transported military freight and supplies using Douglas C-47 Skytrain and Douglas C-53 Skytrooper aircraft. The unit remained in England until 15 November until being transferred to Tafaraoui Airfield, Algeria as part of Twelfth Air Force.

==== 153d Observation Squadron ====
After the departure of the transport group, Keevil saw the arrival of the 153rd Observation Squadron from the 67th Recon Group at RAF Membury in December 1942.

From Keevil the squadron flew a combination of Douglas Bostons, Douglas A-20 Havocs and Supermarine Spitfires. In March 1944 the 153d OS was disbanded, then re-formed for duties as the 2911th Bomb Squadron as a liaison and communications squadron, being equipped with Stinson L-5 Sentinel at RAF Erlestoke.

==== 363d Fighter Group ====
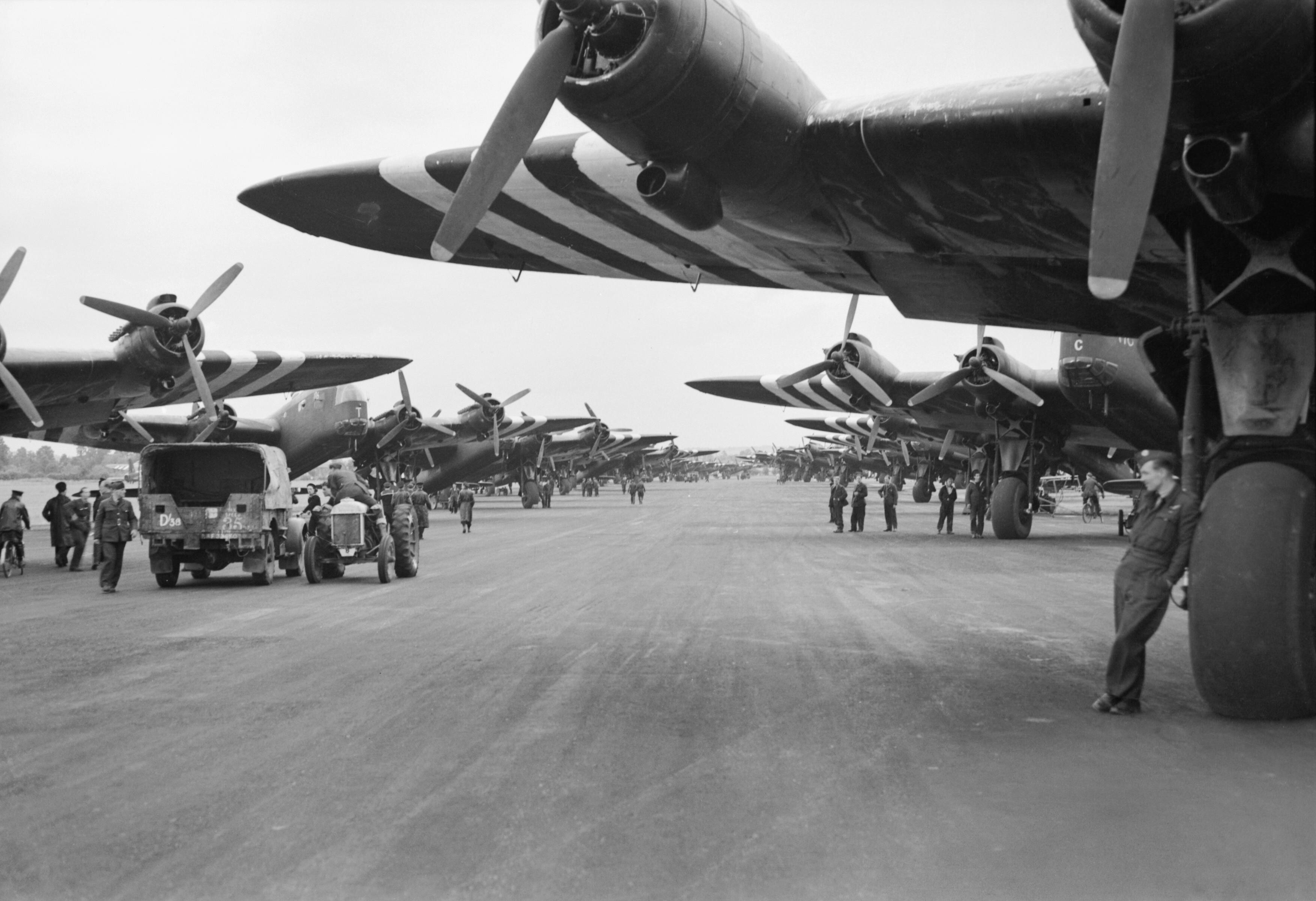
Short Stirlings of Nos. 196 and 299 Squadrons RAF lining the runway at RAF Keevil on the evening of 5 June 1944 before emplaning paratroops of the 5th Parachute Brigade Group for the invasion of Normandy

On 20 December 1943, the Ninth Air Force 363d Fighter Group moved to Keevil from Sacramento AAF California. The group consisted of the following operational squadrons:

- 380th Fighter Squadron
- 381st Fighter Squadron
- 382d Fighter Squadron

The group awaited its operational aircraft until 22 January 1944 when the group moved to RAF Rivenhall in Essex.

=== RAF Fighter Command use ===
With the departure of the Americans, the RAF used Keevil beginning in March 1944 for 196 and 299 Squadron. Short Stirling glider tugs of No. 38 Group RAF arrived, followed by a large number of Airspeed Horsa gliders, crewed by Army pilots of the Glider Pilot Regiment.

The RAF Stirling aircraft were crewed by RAF, RCAF, RAAF, RNZAF and SAAF personnel and were engaged in Special Operations Executive (SOE) and Special Air Service (SAS) drops, largely in France, and in glider towing. Their involvement in the Normandy invasion of France and Operation Market-Garden is well remembered by Keevil and Steeple Ashton villagers. Casualties of army and air force personnel were heavy and a number of aircraft were lost.

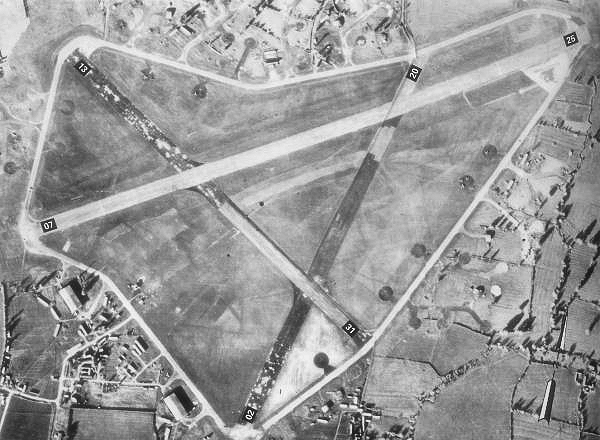
Keevil airfield on 4 November 1956. The secondary runways are deteriorating; the main runway is still being maintained as an auxiliary runway for the USAF.

=== RAF Flying Training Command use ===
The departure of these units to East Anglia brought Keevil to a training role when in October 1944 No. 22 Heavy Glider Conversion Unit arrived, with their twin-engined Armstrong Whitworth Albemarle aircraft and Waco Hadrian Gliders.

They in turn were replaced in June 1945 by 61 Operation Training Unit converting newly qualified pilots on to Spitfires and, later, on to North American Mustangs. 61 OTU in due course became 203 Advanced Flying School and moved to Chivenor in Devon in July 1947 and this marked the end of RAF Keevil as a fully staffed and equipped operational airfield.

=== Postwar military use ===
Between 1955 and 1964 the United States Air Force used the base occasionally. During 1956 and 1957, Keevil was used as a satellite airfield for "ab initio" training by No 2 Flying Training School, based at RAF Hullavington. Aircraft included the Percival Jet Provost T.1.

Keevil was kept in reserve status until 1965 when it was closed. Subsequently, it was regularly used for British Army and RAF exercises; a monthly flying schedule was published by RAF Brize Norton. Around 2023, management of the airfield was transferred from the RAF to the Army Air Corps, specifically the Joint Aviation Command at Middle Wallop.

In September 1994 the Keevil Society, organised by Paul Vingoe, held a Commemorative Day to mark the 50th anniversary of the D-Day and Arnhem operations and to dedicate a memorial to all who served at Keevil, especially those who flew from there and lost their lives.

In May 2023, the Civil Aviation Authority granted permission for Keevil to be used by the Royal Artillery as a base for Thales Watchkeeper WK450 drone exercises on the nearby Salisbury Plain Training Area, with operations commencing in June 2023.

For a number of years until 2024, the airfield was the home of Bannerdown Gliding Club, a Royal Air Force Gliding & Soaring Association club which was affiliated to RAF Lyneham and later to Brize Norton. By 2026, the club had reformed as RAF Brize Norton Gliding Club at Colerne Airfield.

== Current use ==
Keevil airfield is virtually complete with all of its runways, perimeter track and many of the hardstands still in place. The airfield has been occasionally used as a motorsport circuit for various events and is also used by the Wessex Model Flying Club.

In 2012, proposals were made to add a fourth runway parallel to 06/24, a Tactical Landing Zone – a copy of a temporary battlefield runway – by breaking up some of the hard surfaces.

The hangar that was used for Spitfire final assembly is outside the present-day airfield boundary at grid reference ST 910 570, and is now used by small businesses.

== See also ==
- List of former Royal Air Force stations
- United States Air Force in the United Kingdom
