= Taszár Air Base =

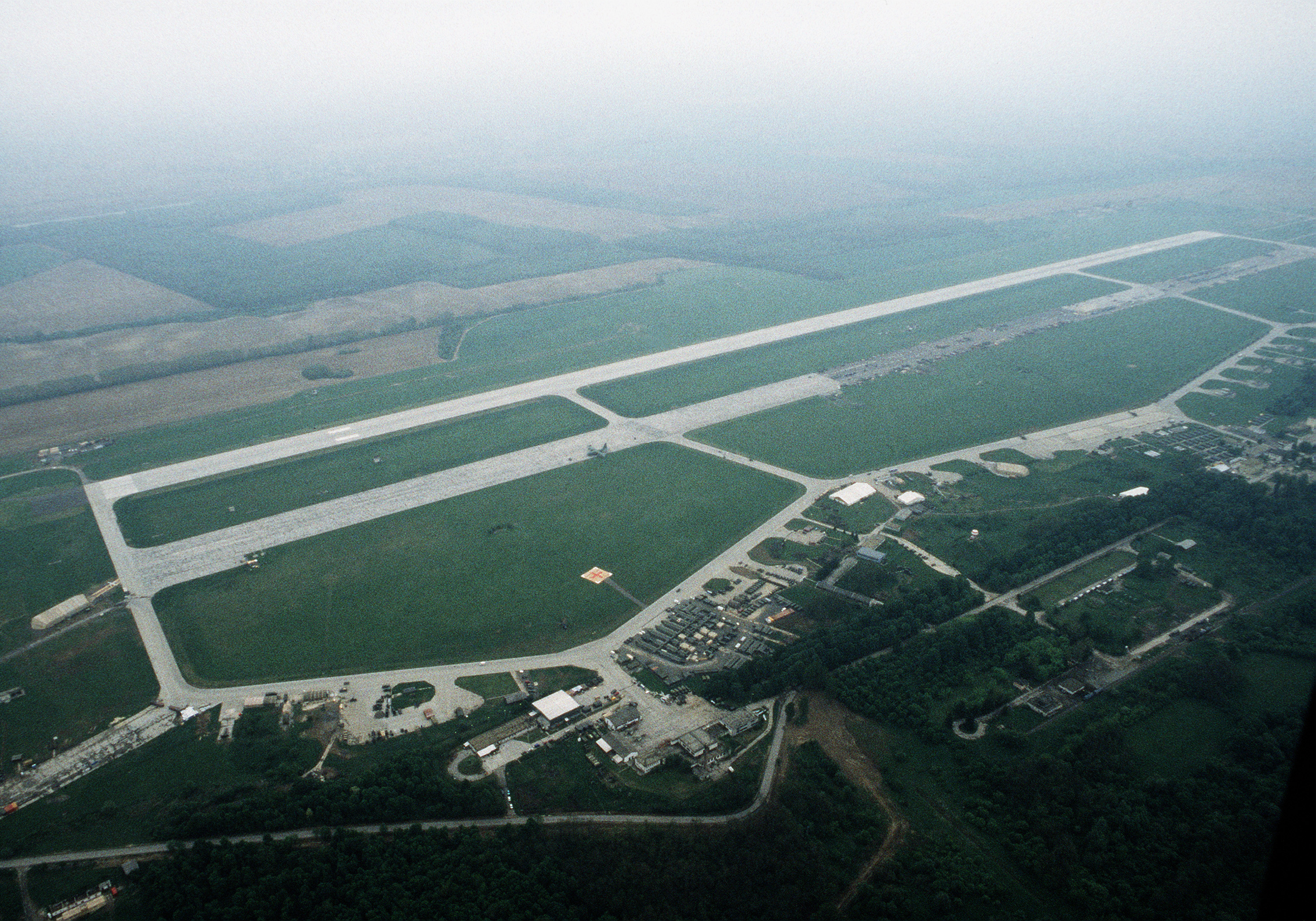
- IATA: none; ICAO: LHTA

Summary
- Airport type: Military
- Location: Taszár, Hungary
- Elevation AMSL: 156 m / 512 ft
- Coordinates: 46°23′36″N 017°55′06″E

Map
- Location of Taszár Air Base

Runways
Direction	Length		Surface
Direction	m	ft	Surface
16/34	2,500	8,202	Concrete
- Source: HungaryAirport.hu

Taszár Air Base (ICAO: LHTA) is a military air base located near Taszár, Somogy County, Hungary. It is 10 kilometres (5 NM) east of Kaposvár.

It became the primary staging post for peacekeeping forces coming and going into the Balkans in December of 1995 becoming NATO's first military base in former Warsaw Pact territory. During two years of Operations Joint Endeavor and Joint Guard, Taszar can claim Europe's largest airlift mission since World War II. Normally, three or four C-130s make daily two-hour hops to Taszar from Ramstein AB, Germany. But during rotation surges, activity jumps to 20 aircraft - including jumbo commercial charters - that deliver some 4,000 US replacement peacekeepers.

In 1999 the airbase was used by the United States Marine Corps as a base for aircraft supporting Operation Allied Force in Kosovo. During Operation Joint Forge (1998-2004) the National Support Element (NSE) of the U.S. Army (consisting of approximately 250 U.S. Army personnel) was located at the airbase. In late 2000 the NSE's designation was changed to United States Army Support Element Tasar (USASET).

It was reportedly 'mothballed' in 2001, but the United States then used it to train the Free Iraqi Forces before March 2003. Then Major General David Barno said the training programme had been ended, with the departure of the second group of Free Iraqi Forces, on April 1, 2003.

As of April 2011, it is reported "disused".

== Facilities ==
The air base is at an elevation of 156 metres (512 ft) above mean sea level. It has one runway designated 16/34 with a concrete surface measuring 2,500 by 70 metres (8,202 ft × 230 ft).
