= Goubrine Airfield =

Tunisian abandoned military airfield

Goubrine Airfield
- Part of Twelfth Air Force

Site information
- Type: Military airfield
- Controlled by: United States Army Air Forces

Location
- Coordinates: 35°32′08.76″N 010°38′40.63″E

Site history
- Built: 1943
- In use: 1943-1944

Location of Goubrine Airfield, Tunisia

Goubrine Airfield is an abandoned military airfield in Tunisia, about 10 km south of Manzil Kāmil, and 145 km south-southeast of Tunis. Its last known use was by the United States Army Air Force Twelfth Air Force in 1943 during the North African Campaign against the German Afrika Korps. It was used by the following units:

- HQ 51st Troop Carrier Wing, 24 July-29 August 1943
- 4th Troop Carrier Squadron (62d Troop Carrier Group), 25 June-7 September 1943, C-47 Skytrain
- 7th Troop Carrier Squadron (62d Troop Carrier Group), 26 July-6 September 1943, C-47 Skytrain
- 8th Troop Carrier Squadron (62d Troop Carrier Group), 28 July-7 September 1943, C-47 Skytrain
- 51st Troop Carrier Squadron (62d Troop Carrier Group), 2 July-6 September 1943, C-47 Skytrain

After the Americans moved out, the airfield was dismantled and abandoned. Today, the precise location of the field can not be determined, as agricultural use has erased all evidence of its existence.
