= Rosignano Airfield =

Rosignano Airfield
- Part of Twelfth Air Force

Site information
- Type: Military airfield
- Controlled by: United States Army Air Forces

Location
- Coordinates: 43°20′40″N 010°29′25″E

Site history
- Built: 1944
- In use: 1944-1945

Location of Rosignano Airfield, Italy

Rosignano Airfield is an abandoned World War II military airfield in Italy, located near the comune of Rosignano Marittimo in the Province of Livorno in Tuscany.

The area was captured by the Fifth Army in the early summer of 1944, and the airfield was used by the United States Army Air Force Twelfth Air Force in 1945 during the Italian campaign. Known units assigned were:

- 416th Night Fighter Squadron, P-61 Black Widow, 1 September-1 October 1944

Operations included defensive patrols of Naples, Leghorn (Livorno), Pisa and Florence. Also provided air defense of Fifth Army operations and intruder sweeps of the Po Valley in Northern Italy.

- 62d Troop Carrier Group, 30 September 1944-8 January 1945

4th, 7th, 8th, 51st, 517th TC Squadrons, C-47 Skytrain

- 47th Bombardment Group, October–11 December 1944

84th, 85th, 86th, 97th, Bomb Squadrons, A-26 Invader

- 64th Troop Carrier Group, 10 January-23 May 1945

16th, 17th, 18th, 35th TC Squadrons, C-47 Skytrain

- 2641st Special Group, 24 March-20 May 1945

859th Bomb Squadron, B-24 Liberator
Engaged in special operations assigned to Fifteenth Air Force.

The 457th Air Service Squadron provided base support functions for the station, and the 904th Base Security Battalion provided security for the airfield and ground station.

The primary runway ran NNW ~ SSE 100' x 6,000', PSP field was developed with 100 Hardstands. Status operational from 1 April 1945/.

The USAAF ended its operations at Rosignano about 30 September 1945 when the 117th Army Airways Communications Squadron closed its facility on the station. Today there is little or no evidence of the airfield, as the land has been returned to agricultural use.
