= Siena–Ampugnano Airport =

Siena–Ampugnano Airport Aeroporto di Siena-Ampugnano
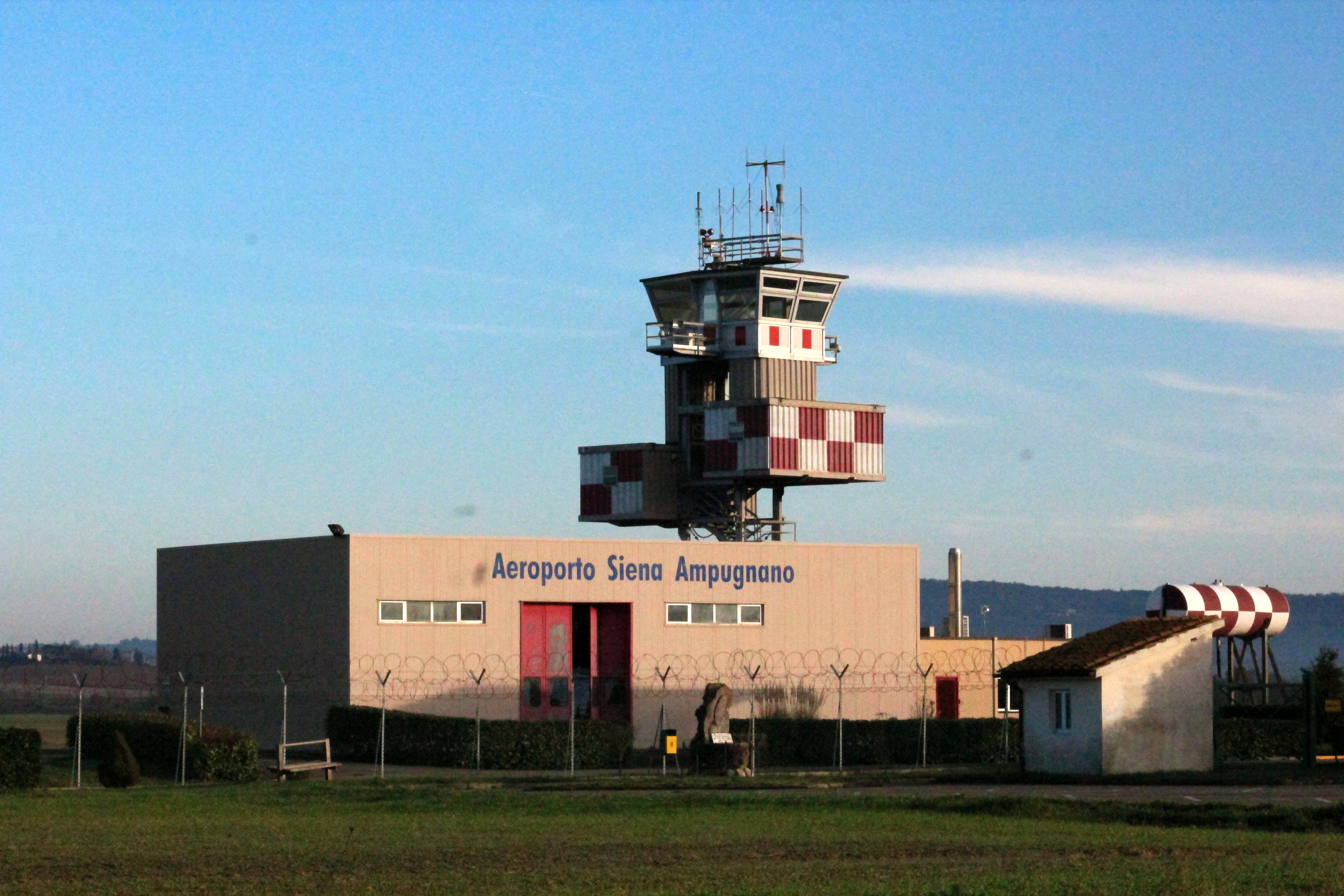
- IATA: none; ICAO: LIQS

Summary
- Airport type: Military / Public
- Serves: Siena, Tuscany, Italy
- Elevation AMSL: 634 ft (193 m)
- Coordinates: 43°15′23″N 011°15′18″E
- Website: https://www.skyservices.it/article/welcome-to-siena-airport

Map
- Location of airport in Italy

Runways
Direction	Length		Surface
Direction	m	ft	Surface
18/36	1,393	4,570	Asphalt

Statistics (2012)
- Passengers: 3745
- Passenger change 11–12: ▼ -23.0%
- Aircraft movements: 2492
- Movements change 11–12: ▼ -20.8%
- Source: Italian AIP at EUROCONTROL; Statistics from Assaeroporti

Siena–Ampugnano Airport (Italian: Aeroporto di Siena-Ampugnano) (ICAO: LIQS) was a small military airfield in Ampugnano, near Siena, in Tuscany, Italy. All employment has been terminated in 2014.

2008 the site has been proposed for a new international airport capable of handling 4 million passengers a year by 2020. Since 2003 the project has met widespread local opposition. Upon request about current status and future of the airport in November 2016 the Siena Comune confirmed by eMail: ″the airport of Siena is not operating″. As of January 2017, the field is mentioned as being operated by Sky Services. There are however indications of very high fees and rates, opposed to limited or low levels of service.

== History ==
During World War II, the facility was known as Malignano Airfield. It was a major United States Air Force Twelfth Air Force base of operations during the Italian Campaign.

== Facilities ==
The airport resides at an elevation of 634 feet (193 m) above mean sea level. It has one runway designated 18/36 with an asphalt surface measuring 1,393 by 30 metres (4,570 ft × 98 ft).
