= Mostaganem Airport =

- IATA: MQV; ICAO: none; LID: DA14

Summary
- Airport type: Public
- Location: Algeria
- Elevation AMSL: 732 ft / 223 m
- Coordinates: 35°54′31.99″N 000°08′56.39″E

Map
- Location of airport in Algeria

Runways
Direction	Length		Surface
Direction	ft	m	Surface
23/05	3,550	1,800	Asphalt
31/13	2,275	100	Asphalt

Mostaganem Airport is a civilian airport in Mostaganem Province, Algeria (IATA: MQV), located about 280 km west-southwest of Algiers. The airport has no commercial air service, and is sparsely used by general aviation.

== World War II ==
During World War II, the facility was known as "Matemore Airfield". It was a major Twelfth Air Force Troop Carrier transport base of operations during the North African Campaign against the German Afrika Korps. It was used by the following combat units:

- 4th Troop Carrier Squadron (62d Troop Carrier Group), 18 May-25 June 1943, C-47 Skytrain
- 7th Troop Carrier Squadron (62d Troop Carrier Group), 21 May-22 June 1943, C-47 Skytrain
- 8th Troop Carrier Squadron (62d Troop Carrier Group), 17 May-1 June 1943, C-47 Skytrain
- 51st Troop Carrier Squadron (62d Troop Carrier Group), 16 May-2 July 1943, C-47 Skytrain
