= Ponte Olivo Airfield =

Ponte Olivo Airfield

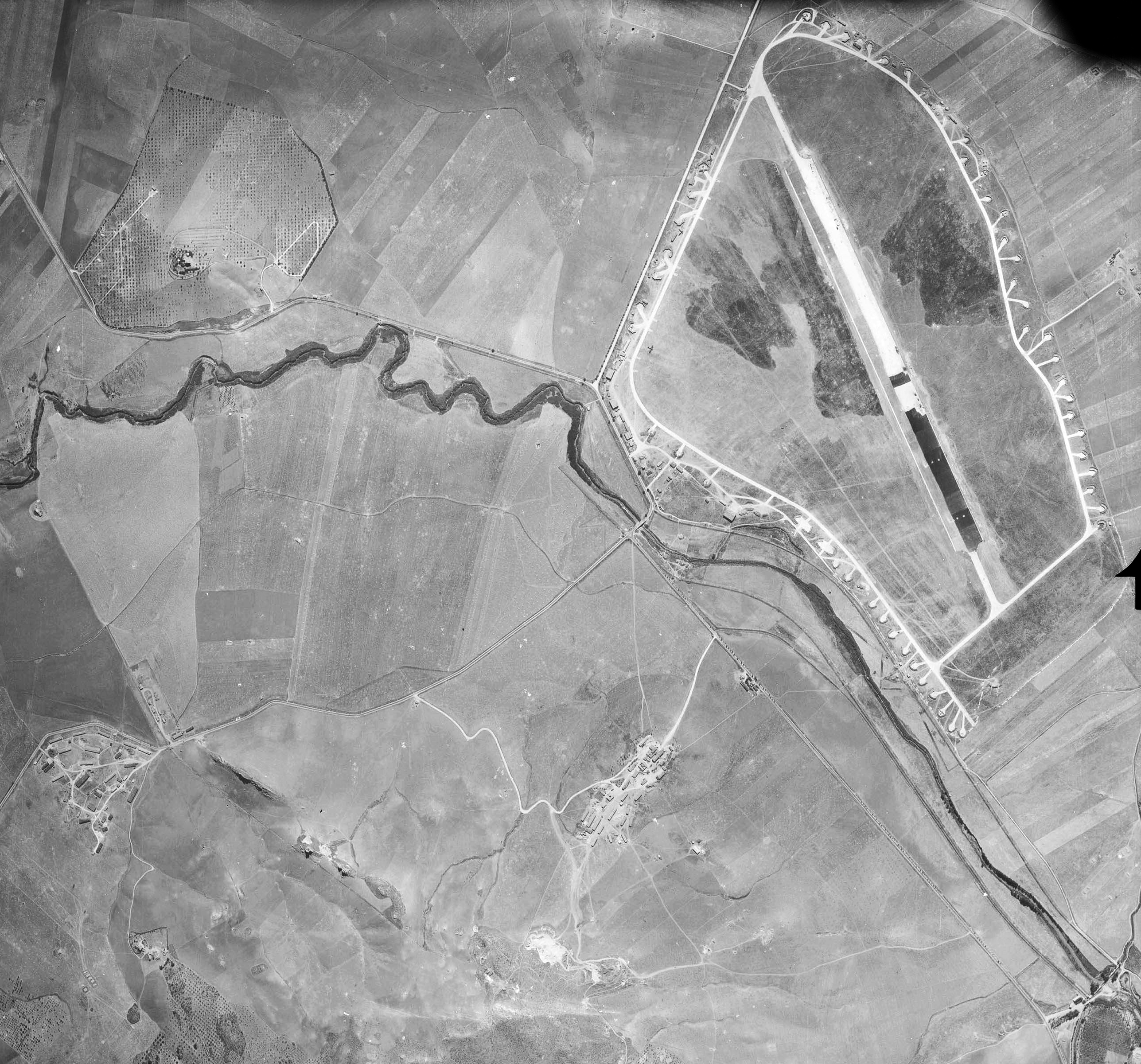

Site information
- Type: Military airfield
- Controlled by: United States Army Air Forces
- Condition: Abandoned

Location
- Coordinates: 37°07′51.68″N 14°19′17.27″E

Site history
- Built: Civil airfield prior to World War II
- In use: 1920s?-1944

Location of Ponte Olivo Airfield, Italy

Ponte Olivo Airfield is an abandoned pre-World War II airport and later wartime military airfield in Sicily, 3 kilometres (1.9 mi) north of Gela. Its last known use was by the United States Army Air Force Twelfth Air Force in 1944 during the Italian Campaign.

== History ==
Originally built as Ponte Olivo Airport in the 1920s, the airport in September 1939 became base for the 41st Storm of the Italian Regia Aeronautica with 18 Savoia-Marchetti SM.79 that were later transferred (in October 1940) to the Italian bases round Benghazi in Cyrenaica.

Together with Comiso Airport it was extensively used for the bombing of the British bases on the Maltese islands. Canadian fighter ace, Wing Commander "Hilly" Brown, a veteran of the Battle of Britain and the Battle of France, but now flying from RAF Ta Kali on Malta, was killed attacking the airfield in November 1941.

It was the primary objective of the Amphibious Battle of Gela during Operation Husky. On 9 July 1943, the United States Army 82d Airborne Division 505th Regimental Combat Team and the 3d Battalion of the 504th Parachute Regiment was carried by 226 C-47 Skytrains of the 61st, 313th, 314th and 316th Troop Carrier Groups, which departed from Kairouan Airfield, Tunisia. The parachutists mission was to seize the high ground near the airport and to assist the seaborne forces of U.S. II Corps, Seventh Army, in capture of the airfield. Although the parachute drops were widely scattered, the objective was taken. This was the first major airborne operation to be undertaken by Allied forces in World War II. By morning, only 400 of the Regiment's 1600 soldiers had reached the objective area. The others had been dropped in isolated groups on all parts of the island and carried out demolitions, cut lines of communication, established island roadblocks, ambushed German and Italian motorized columns, and caused so much confusion over such an extensive area that initial German radio reports estimated the number of American parachutists dropped to be over ten times the actual number.

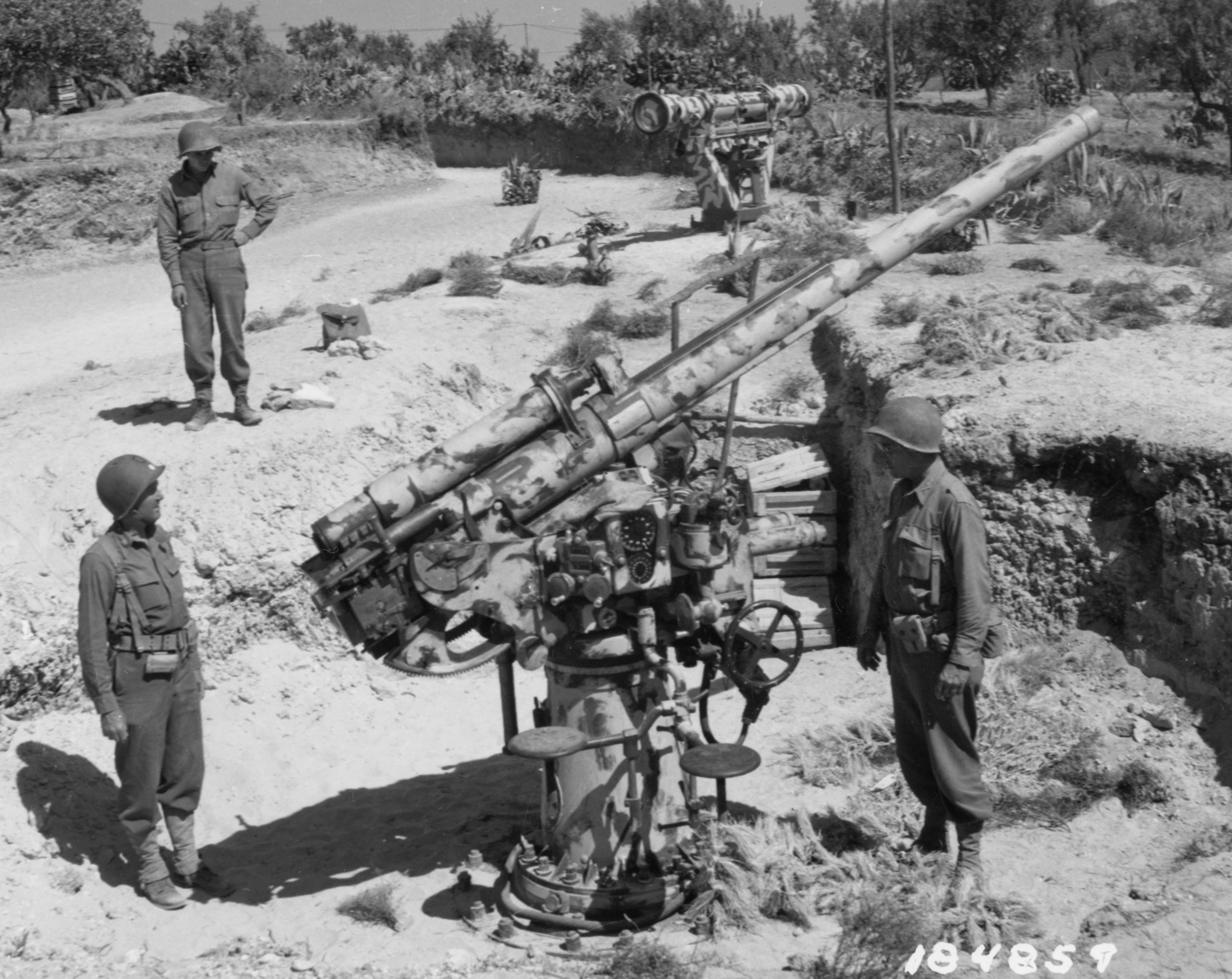
American officers inspect a captured Italian 75mm antiaircraft gun near Ponte Olivo Airfield, Sicily, 1943

Renamed Ponte Olivo Airfield or Gela Airfield by the Americans, the USAAF Twelfth Air Force 27th Fighter Bomber Group landed A-36 Apache ground support aircraft on the field as soon as it was declared secure for operations, supporting ground forces against the German and Italian forces.

The 27th moved to Capaccio Airfield in southern Italy during September. Other units assigned to the airfield were:

- HQ, 64th Fighter Wing, 12 July – 1 September 1943
- HQ, 51st Troop Carrier Wing, 29 August – 29 September 1943
- 12th Bombardment Group, 2–22 August 1943, B-25 Mitchell (9th AF)
- 86th Bombardment Group, 21 July – 27 August 1943, A-36 Apache
- 31st Fighter Group, 13–21 July 1943, Spitfire
- 60th Troop Carrier Group, 31 August – 29 October 1943, C-47 Skytrain
- 62d Troop Carrier Group, 6 September 1943 – February 1944, C-47 Skytrain

The USAAF closed its facilities at the airfield at the end of September 1944, and returned the airport to Italian authorities.

During the late 1950s and early 1960s it was reused as a private airport by Enrico Mattei and other managers of the Ente Nazionale Idrocarburi (ENI) for inspections on the nearby petrochemical refineries. On 27 October 1962 at 07:30, Mattei took off from Ponte Olivo airport for the last time with ENI's private plane, a Morane-Saulnier MS.760 Paris, not knowing he would die a few hours later in the skies of northern Italy when the plane exploded.

Today there are little or no remains of the airfield, with some faint land disturbances visible on aerial photography of its former runways. Some buildings in the area may have been reused and adapted for other purposes.
