= Galera Airfield =

Galera Airfield
- Part of Twelfth Air Force

Site information
- Type: Military airfield
- Controlled by: United States Army Air Forces

Location
- Coordinates: 41°48′39″N 012°22′10″E

Site history
- Built: 1943
- In use: 1944

Location of Galera Airfield, Italy.

Galera Airfield is an abandoned military airfield in the Lazio region of central Italy near western Rome. The strip was laid down with PLS 130 x 6000 with 4-parking areas with the alignment of 69° - 45°.

Code Named Sexton.

Its last known use was by the United States Army Air Force Twelfth Air Force in 1944 during the Italian Campaign. The landing ground was a minor entry point for Rome.

On 23 January 1945 the field was last surveyed as abandoned, with ground being noted as soft and muddy with standing water; surface not stable to enough to sustain aircraft. It was also noted by the V Area Engineer Office that the field was not entirely cleared of mines

Today, the site of the airfield is very visible on current maps.
