= Oran Tafraoui Airport =

Oran Tafaraoui Airport
- IATA: TAF; ICAO: DAOL

Summary
- Airport type: Public/Military
- Owner: People’s National Army
- Operator: Algerian Air Force
- Serves: Oran, Algeria
- Elevation AMSL: 112 m / 367 ft
- Coordinates: 35°32′30″N 000°32′00″W

Map
- Location of airport in Algeria

Runways
Direction	Length		Surface
Direction	m	ft	Surface
08/26	2,754	9,035	Asphalt
- Source:World Aero Data

Oran Tafaraoui Airport is a joint civil/military airport in Oran Province, Algeria (IATA: TAF, ICAO: DAOL).

== History ==
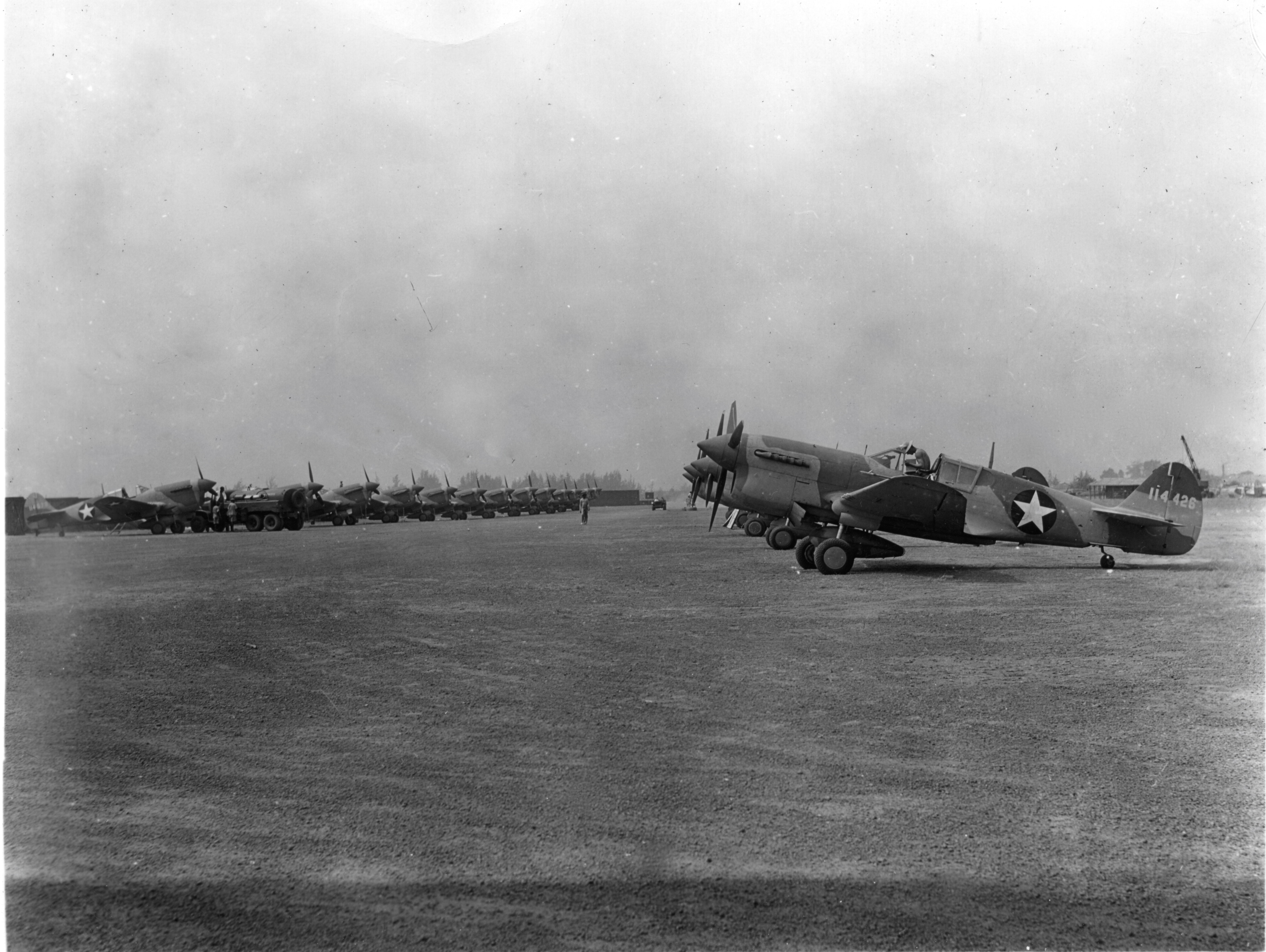
Americans Curtiss P-40 Warhawk, Tafraoui base, 1943.

During World War II, it was a primary mission objective of the United States Army 34th Infantry Division during the Allied Operation Torch landings on 8 November 1942, and became a major Twelfth Air Force base of operations during the North African campaign against the German Afrika Korps.

Tafaraoui became a staging and transit point for many units:

- 11–20 November 1942 - 1st Fighter Group HQ and the 27th, 71st and 94th Fighter Squadrons, flying Lockheed P-38 Lightnings, arrived then departed Tafaraoui.
- 14 November 1942 - HQ 14th Fighter Group, HQ 62d Troop Carrier Group, and the 4th and 7th Troop Carrier Squadrons arrive at Tafaraoui with Douglas C-47 Skytrains
- 16 November 1942 - 8th Troop Carrier Squadron, 62d Troop Carrier Group, arrive at Tafaraoui from the UK with C-47s; the 111th and 154th Observation Squadrons, 68th Observation Group, moves from St Leu to Tafaraoui with A-20s
- 17 November 1942 - 437th and 438th Bombardment Squadrons (Medium), 319th Bombardment Group (Medium), move from Saint-Leu to Tafaraoui with B-26s.
- November 42 - HQ 319th Bombardment Group (Medium) and the 439th, and 440th Bombardment Squadrons (Medium) move from St Leu to Tafaraoui with Martin B-26 Marauders; "A" flight of the air echelon of the 15th Photographic Mapping Squadron, 3d Photographic Group, arrives at Tafaraoui with B-17 Flying Fortresses and F-4s (P-38 photo reconnaissance aircraft).

The new desert Supermarine Spitfires of the 31st Fighter Group were also assigned to Tafaraoui. Other aircraft at the field included P-38s of the 14th, B-26s, North American B-25 Mitchells, Douglas A-20 Havocs, General Jimmy Doolittle's B-17G, some French Amiot bombers around, and some old wrecks fixed up as dummies.

== Current use ==
In 1966 the airport was established as an airbase and training ground for the Algerian Air Force.
