= 307th Fighter Squadron =

US Air Force Reserve group

307th Fighter Squadron

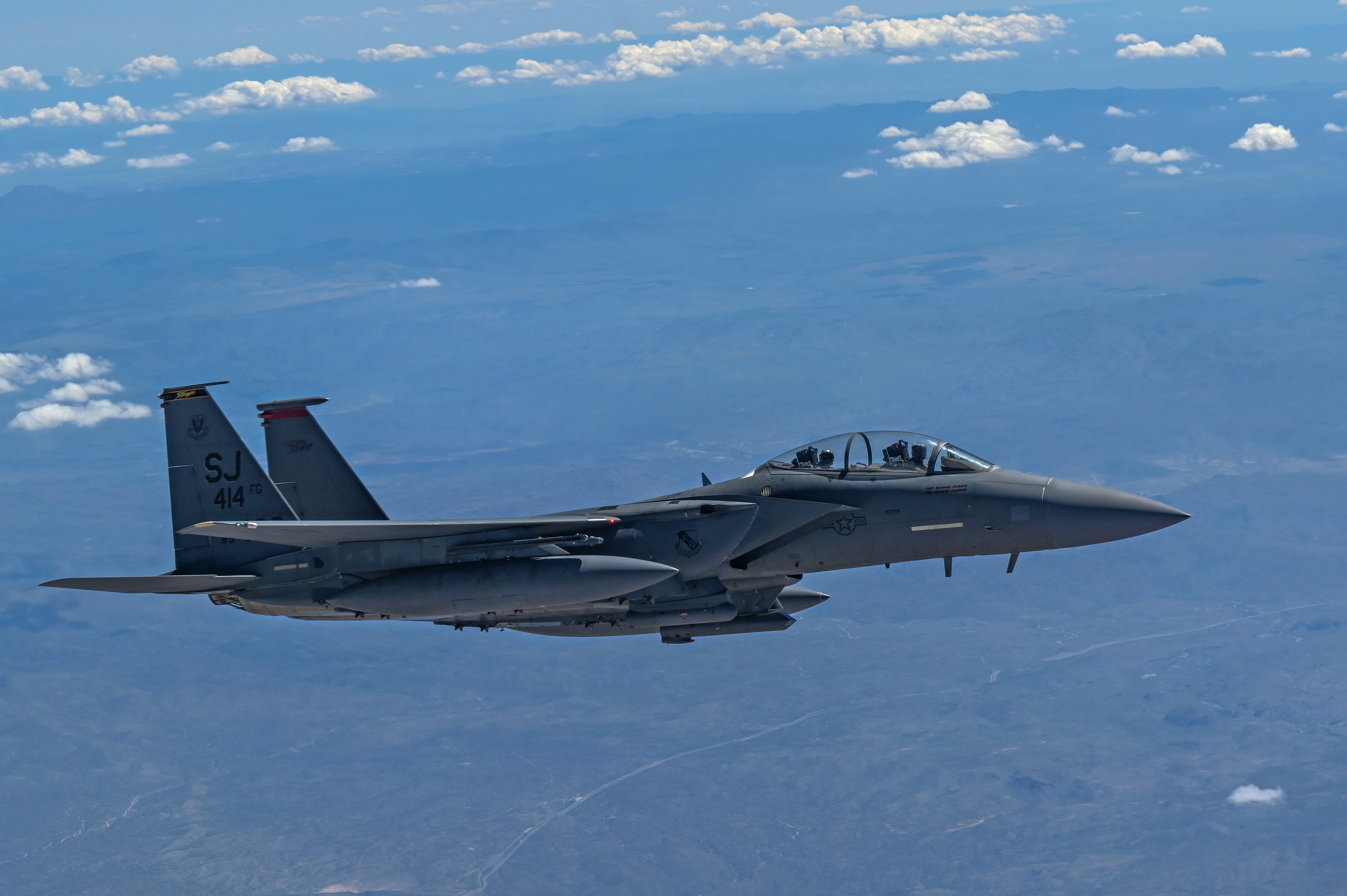
- One of the squadron's F-15E Strike Eagles over Arizona in 2022
- Active: 1942–1945; 1946–1989; 1991–1995; 2003–present
- Country: United States
- Branch: United States Air Force
- Role: Fighter
- Part of: Air Force Reserve Command
- Garrison/HQ: Seymour Johnson Air Force Base
- Nickname: Stingers
- Engagements: European Theater of Operations; Mediterranean Theater of Operations; Vietnam War
- Decorations: Distinguished Unit Citation; Air Force Outstanding Unit Award; Republic of Vietnam Gallantry Cross with Palm

Commanders
- Current commander: Lt Col Sriram Krishnan

Insignia
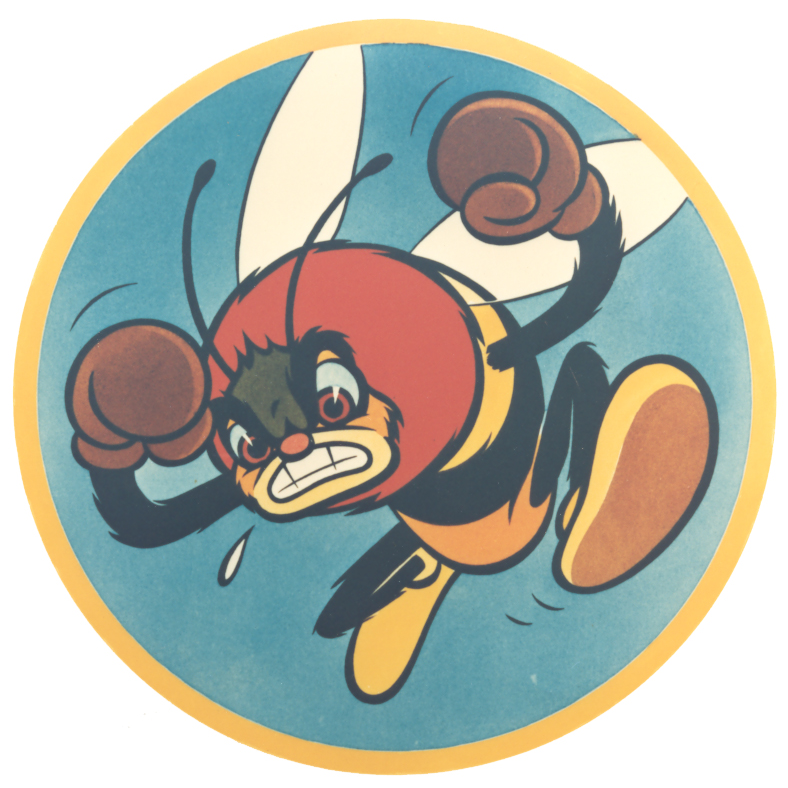
- 307th Fighter Sq emblem (approved 16 October 1944

The 307th Fighter Squadron is a McDonnell Douglas F-15E Strike Eagle unit and is part of Air Force Reserve Command's 414th Fighter Group stationed at Seymour Johnson Air Force Base, North Carolina.

The mission of the 307 FS is to assist the 4th Fighter Wing at Seymour Johnson to produce qualified F-15E aircrew. The squadron became operational in September 2011.

== History ==
=== World War II ===
Initially established under Third Air Force in early 1942 as a fighter squadron at Baer Field, Indiana, flying some antisubmarine patrols in the Gulf of Mexico.

Deployed to the European Theater of Operations in June 1942 without aircraft as its Curtiss P-40 Warhawks and Bell P-39 Airacobras were deemed unsuitable for use against German aircraft in long-range bomber escort duties. Was re-equipped with RAF Supermarine Spitfire Vs and its pilots and technicians spent a two-month period undergoing intensive training in flying and fighting with RAF pilots in the British aircraft from airfields in southeast England. The squadron flew its first combat mission on 18 August 1942, when it attacked enemy positions in occupied France.

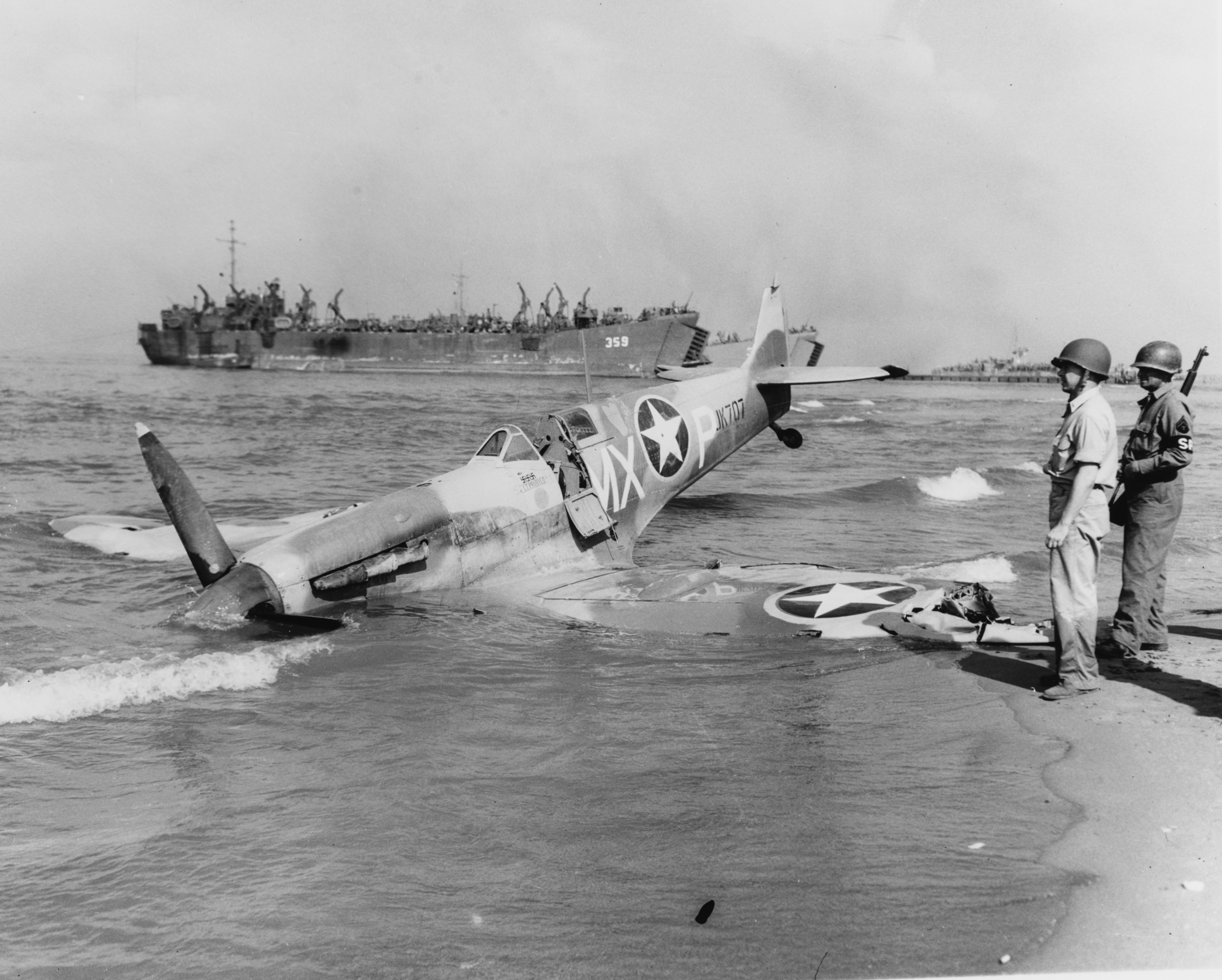
A Spitfire from the 307th Fighter Squadron, flown by Major Virgil C Fields, that crash-landed on the beach at Salerno, Italy after being damaged by a German Dornier Do 217, September 1943

Assigned to the new Twelfth Air Force and deployed to Gibraltar in November 1942 as part of the Operation Torch invasion forces, initially operating from former Vichy French airfields in Algeria. Advanced east across Algeria and Tunisia during the North African Campaign, supporting the Fifth United States Army which halted Field Marshal Rommel's advance on allied positions. Spitfires from the squadron provided support for Allied Forces as the Invasion of Italy began with the capture of Sicily, and later the landings by Allied forces in Fascist Italy, moving north supporting the Fifth Army during the Italian Campaign. As Allied bomber forces operating from Italy began the strategic bombing of Axis petroleum and communications facilities in central Europe and the Balkans, the squadron was re-equipped with the North American P-51 Mustang to replace the shorter-ranged Spitfire. In August 1944, the P-51's were involved in the invasion of Southern France.

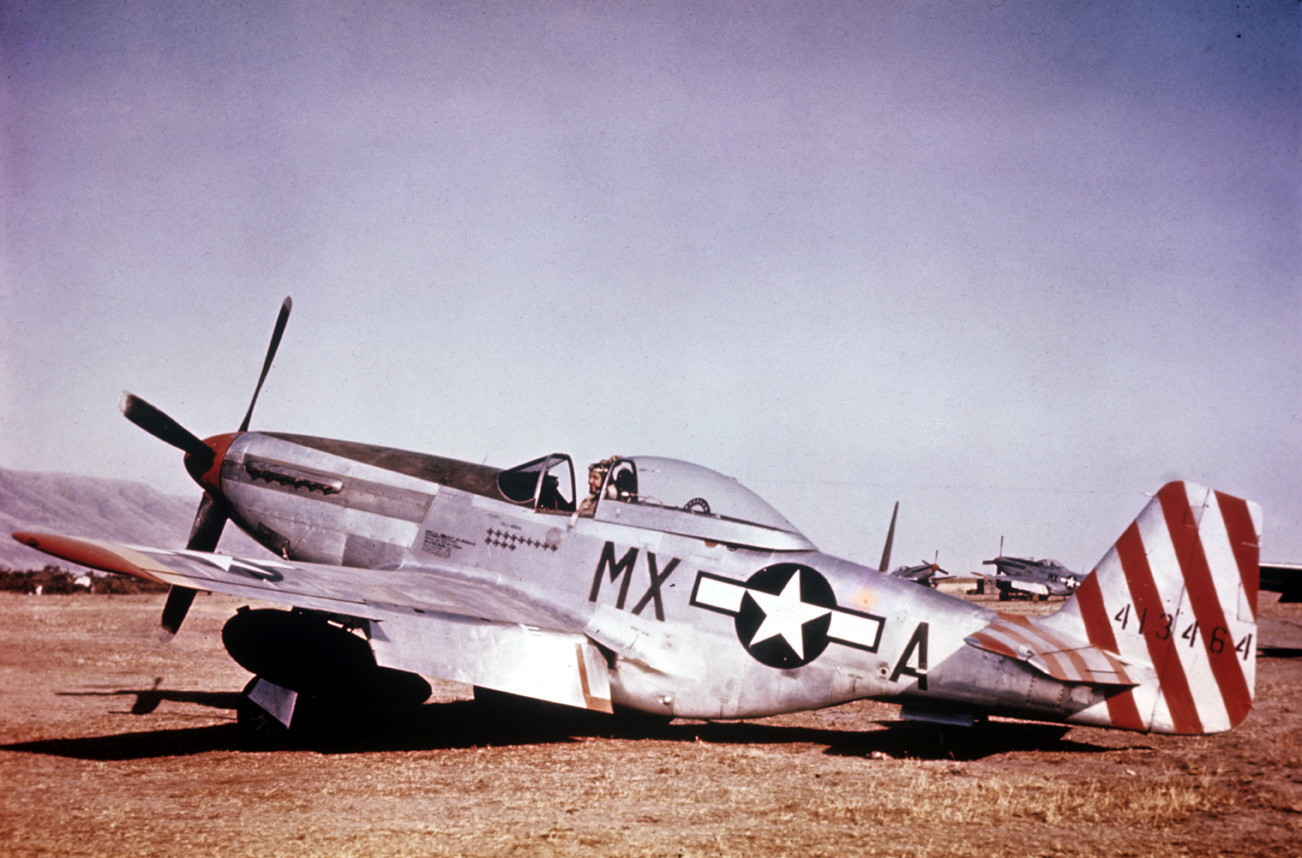
A P-51D-5-NA Mustang (MX-A, serial number 44-13464), flown by Major Sam Brown of the 307th Fighter Squadron, 31st Fighter Group

By war's end, the squadron had earned two Distinguished Unit Citations and was involved in eight campaigns The squadron was largely demobilized during the summer of 1945 in Europe, a skeleton force returned to Drew Field, Florida in August, inactivating largely as an administrative unit in November.

Reactivated from elements of several inactivating organizations in Germany in August 1946, performed occupation duty and operating early-model Lockheed P-80A Shooting Star jets from former Luftwaffe jet-capable airfields at AAF Station Giebelstadt and AAF Station Kitzingen. Returned to the United States in June 1947 without personnel or equipment which remained in Germany.

=== Cold War ===
Assigned to Strategic Air Command at Langley Field, Virginia as a fighter-escort squadron, equipped with straight-winged Republic F-84E Thunderjets. Assigned to Turner AFB, Georgia with mission of long-range escort of B-29 Superfortress bombers, later B-50 and B-36 Peacemakers as newer aircraft came into operation by SAC. Inactivated 1958 with phaseout of B-36 and end of SAC escort fighter concept.

Reactivated in 1959 as Tactical Air Command North American F-100 Super Sabre fighter-bomber squadron at George Air Force Base, California. Trained in tactical air support of ground forces, deploying to NATO bases for operational exercises. Reassigned to Homestead Air Force Base, Florida after the Cuban Missile Crisis, late 1962 to provide air defense of South Florida. Was deployed for 3 months to Southeast Asia, in 1964 as part of advisory forces operating against North Vietnamese and National Liberation Front forces in South Vietnam.

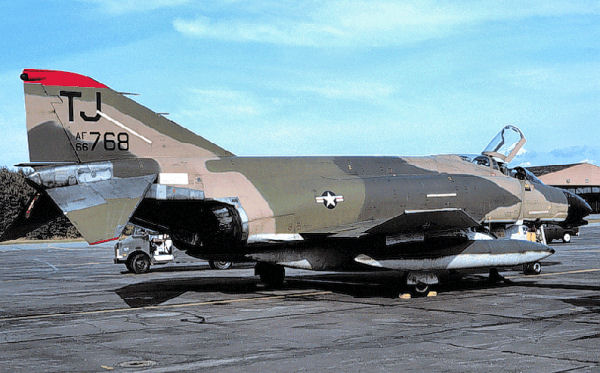
F-4D Phantom II of the 307th (Note: Aircraft is McDonnell F-4D-32-MC Phantom II serial 66-8768. This aircraft is now on permanent display in front of VFW post in Bastrop, Texas. (Photo taken at Ramstein Air Base, Germany).)

Reassigned to NATO, becoming permanently based at Torrejon AB, Spain in 1966 when SAC turned Spanish bases over to USAFE. Initially equipped with F-100s, in 1970 received McDonnell F-4E Phantom IIs. Reassigned back to TAC at Homestead AFB in 1971, as part of re-establishment of 31st TFW upon its return from duty in Southeast Asia. Was deployed to Thailand, July 1972, engaging North Vietnamese forces in northern South Vietnam in response to the communist spring offensive. Returned to the United States in the late fall, 1972.

For the next 20 years, performed routine training and tactical deployments from Homestead, upgraded to the General Dynamics F-16A Fighting Falcon in 1988. At the end of 1986 the squadron and wing changed tail codes from ZF to HS which better matched the squadrons location in Homestead. Upgraded to receive Shaw AFB block 25s in August 1990. With the Gulf War build up and the 363rd TFW at Shaw AFB deploying to Saudi Arabia meant no more block 25s were available. With some F-16A/B block 15s still in service for the 307th TFS, it continued to operate both types.

When Desert Storm ended it was decided to convert the 31st TFW to block 40 F-16s instead. Up to this point about ten block 25s had reached the 307th FS and had been painted in 'Emerald Knight' markings. They were all sent to other units. Neither of the 31st TFWs other sister squadrons flew the block 25. In March 1991 the 307th began conversion to the block 40 version of the F-16. On 1 October 1991 the word 'Tactical' was dropped and unit became the 307th Fighter Squadron. By early 1992 the conversion to block 40 F-16s with the general purpose role was complete.

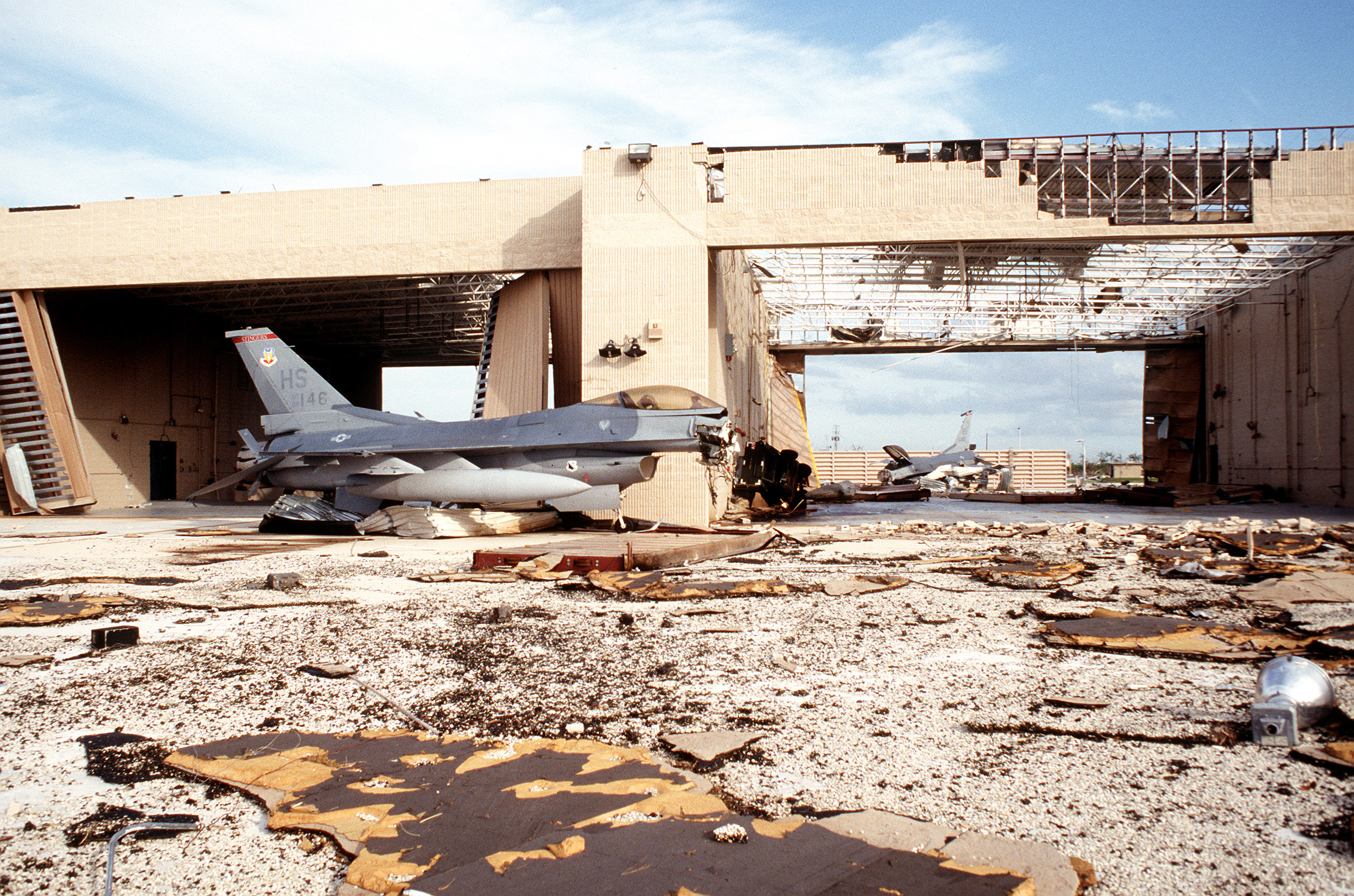
Squadron aircraft at Homestead after Hurricane Andrew (Note: Closest aircraft is 307th Fighter Squadron F-16C serial 89-2146 and the F-16C in the background is serial 88-465 which was repaired and returned to flying status. 89-2146 was repaired afterwards but not to flying status, becoming a GF-16C ground trainer at Sheppard Air Force Base, Texas)

Moved to Moody Air Force Base, Georgia in late August 1992 when Hurricane Andrew threatened South Florida. It was to be a temporary move to Moody, but Homestead AFB was so heavily damaged it was never re-opened for any of the 31st FW squadrons and was eventually turned over to the Air Force Reserve Command's 482nd Fighter Wing and renamed Homestead Air Reserve Base. After the destruction of Homestead AFB, the 307th FS was reassigned permanently to the 347th Operations Group at Moody. At this point the 'HS' tail code began to be replaced with a 'MY' tail code, with some block 40 F-16s were delivered right from the factory to the 307th Fighter Squadron's new home base. It deployed to Saudi Arabia from, March–June 1995 in support of Operation Southern Watch. Inactivated in 1995 when Air Combat Command temporarily closed down ACC operations at the base, temporarily turning Moody over to Air Education and Training Command as a training base.

=== Modern era ===
It was reactivated in 2003 as an Air Force Reserve Command McDonnell Douglas F-15 Eagle training squadron, where its mission was to train Air Force Reserve pilots in the F-15C at Langley Air Force Base, Virginia as an adjunct for the 1st Fighter Wing. The unit was moved from Langley to Seymour Johnson Air Force Base in 2010 in realignment with the phaseout of the F-15C at Langley pending the arrival of the F-22 Raptor and the need for an Associate Air Force Reserve F-15E Strike Eagle unit at Seymour Johnson.

== Lineage ==
- Constituted 'as the 307th Pursuit Squadron' (Interceptor) on 21 January 1942

Activated on 30 January 1942
Redesignated 307th Fighter Squadron on 15 May 1942
Redesignated 307th Fighter Squadron, Single Engine on 20 August 1943
Inactivated on 7 November 1945

- Activated on 20 August 1946

Redesignated 307th Fighter Squadron, Jet Propelled on 19 February 1947
Redesignated 307th Fighter Squadron, Single Engine on 3 November 1947
Redesignated 307th Fighter Squadron, Jet on 15 June 1948
Redesignated 307th Fighter-Bomber Squadron on 20 January 1950
Redesignated 307th Fighter-Escort Squadron on 16 July 1950
Redesignated 307th Strategic Fighter Squadron on 20 January 1953
Redesignated 307th Fighter-Bomber Squadron on 1 April 1957
Redesignated 307th Tactical Fighter Squadron on 1 July 1958
Redesignated 307th Tactical Fighter Training Squadron on 1 July 1983
Redesignated 307th Tactical Fighter Squadron on 1 April 1988
Inactivated on 1 July 1989

- Activated on 30 September 1991

Re-designated 307th Fighter Squadron on 1 November 1991
Inactivated on 31 August 1995

- Activated in the reserve on 1 August 2003

=== Assignments ===
- 31st Pursuit Group (later 31st Fighter Group), 30 January 1942 – 7 November 1945
- 31st Fighter Group (later 31st Fighter-Bomber Group, 31st Fighter Escort Group), 20 August 1946 (attached to 31st Fighter-Escort Wing after 27 July 1951)
- 31st Fighter-Escort Wing (later 31st Strategic Fighter Wing, 31st Fighter-Bomber Wing, 31st Tactical Fighter Wing), 16 June 1952

Attached to Alaskan Air Command, 7 November–7 December 1956
Attached to 48th Fighter-Bomber Wing, 27 February–9 August 1958
Attached to Unknown, 15 March–19 July 1959, 8 November 1960 – 9 March 1961, and 18–28 February 1962
Attached to 18th Tactical Fighter Wing, 17 December 1962 – 16 March 1963
Attached to Unknown, 27 December 1963 – 5 March 1964
Attached to 7231st Combat Support Group, 23 November 1964 – 14 March 1965
Attached to 34th Tactical Group, 24 June–7 July 1965
Attached to 6251st Tactical Fighter Wing, 8 July – 20 November 1965
Attached to 3d Tactical Fighter Wing, 21 November – 6 December 1965

- 401st Tactical Fighter Wing, 27 April 1966
- 31st Tactical Fighter Wing (later 31st Tactical Training Wing, 31st Tactical Fighter Wing), 15 July 1971 – 1 July 1989

Attached to 432d Tactical Reconnaissance Wing, 29 July–31 October 1972

- 31st Tactical Fighter Wing (later 31st Fighter Wing), 30 September 1991
- 31st Operations Group, 1 November 1991 (attached to 347th Operations Group after c. 11 September 1992
- 347th Operations Group, 20 November 1992 – 31 August 1995
- Tenth Air Force, 1 August 2003
- 414th Fighter Group, 23 March 2010 – present

=== Stations ===
- Baer Field, Indiana, 30 January 1942
- New Orleans Army Air Base, Louisiana, c. 5 February 1942 – 19 May 1942
- RAF Atcham (AAF-342), England, 11 June 1942
- RAF Biggin Hill (AAF-343), England, 1 August 1942
- RAF Merston (AAF-351), England, 24 August–22 October 1942
- Tafaraoui Airfield, Algeria, 9 November 1942
- La Senia Airfield, Oran, Algeria, 12 November 1942
- Maison Blanche Airport, Algeria, 21 December 1942
- Thelepte Airfield, Tunisia, 7 February 1943
- Tebessa Airfield, Algeria, 17 February 1943
- Youks-les-Bains Airfield, Algeria, 22 February 1943
- Kalaa Djerda Airfield, Tunisia, 25 February 1943
- Thelepte Airfield, Tunisia, 11 March 1943
- Djilma Airfield, Tunisia, 7 April 1943
- Le Sers Airfield, Tunisia, 12 April 1943
- Korba Airfield, Tunisia, c. 15 May 1943
- Ta' Lambert Aerodrome (Gozo), Malta, c. 30 June 1943
- Ponte Olivo Airfield, Sicily, Italy, c. 14 July 1943
- Agrigento Airfield, Sicily, Italy, 21 July 1943
- Palermo Airfield, Sicily, 27 July 1943
- Termini Imerese, Sicily, Italy, 1 August 1943
- Milazzo Airfield, Sicily, Italy, 3 September 1943
- Montecorvino Airfield, Italy, 21 September 1943
- Pomigliano Airfield, Italy, 13 October 1943
- Castel Volturno Airfield, Italy, 18 January 1944
- San Severo Airfield, Italy, 2 April 1944
- Mondolfo Airfield, Italy, 3 March 1945
- Triolo Airfield, Italy, c. 15 July 1945 – 5 August 1945
- Drew Field, Florida, c. 25 August 1945 – 7 November 1945
- AAF Station Giebelstadt, Germany, 20 August 1946)
- AAF Station Kitzingen, Germany, 25 September 1946
- Langley Field, Virginia (1947)
- Turner Air Force Base, Georgia, 4 September 1947

Deployed to RAF Manston, England 26 December 1950 – 25 July 1951
Deployed to Misawa Air Base, Japan 20 July – 16 October 1952, 7 November 1953 – 9 February 1954
Deployed to Eielson Air Force Base, Alaska 7 November – 7 December 1956
Deployed to Hahn Air Base, Germany 25 February – 17 August 1958)\

- George Air Force Base, California, 15 March 1959

Deployed to Moron Air Base, Spain 15 March – 19 July 1959
Deployed to Aviano Air Base, Italy 8 November 1960 – 9 March 1961
Deployed to Ramey Air Force Base, Puerto Rico 18–28 February 1962

- Homestead Air Force Base, Florida, 1 June 1962

Deployed to Kadena Air Base, Okinawa (17 December 1962 – 16 March 1963)
Deployed to Itazuke Air Base, Japan (27 December 1963 – 5 March 1964)
Deployed to Çiğli Air Base, Turkey (23 November 1964 – 14 March 1965)
Deployed to Bien Hoa Air Base, South Vietnam (24 June – 7 December 1965)

- Torrejon Air Base, Spain, 27 April 1966 – 14 July 1971
- Homestead Air Force Base, Florida, 15 July 1971 – 1 July 1989

Deployed to Udorn Royal Thai Air Force Base, Thailand 29 July – 31 October 1972

- Homestead Air Force Base, Florida, 30 September 1991(operated from Moody Air Force Base, Georgia after c. 11 September 1992
- Moody Air Force Base, Georgia, 1 October 1992 – 31 August 1995
- Langley Air Force Base, Virginia, 1 August 2003
- Seymour Johnson Air Force Base, North Carolina, 15 July 2010 – present

=== Aircraft ===
- Curtiss P-40 Warhawk (1942)
- Bell P-39 Airacobra (1942)
- Supermarine Spitfire (1942–1943)
- North American P-51 Mustang (1943–1945, 1947–1948)
- Lockheed P-80 Shooting Star (1946–1947)
- Republic F-84 Thunderjet (1948–1957)
- North American F-100 Super Sabre (1957–1970)
- McDonnell F-4 Phantom II (1970–1988)
- General Dynamics F-16 Fighting Falcon (1988–1989, 1991–1995)
- McDonnell Douglas F-15C/D Eagle (2003–2010)
- McDonnell Douglas F-15E Strike Eagle (2010–present)
