= 309th Fighter Squadron =

US Air Force unit

309th Fighter Squadron

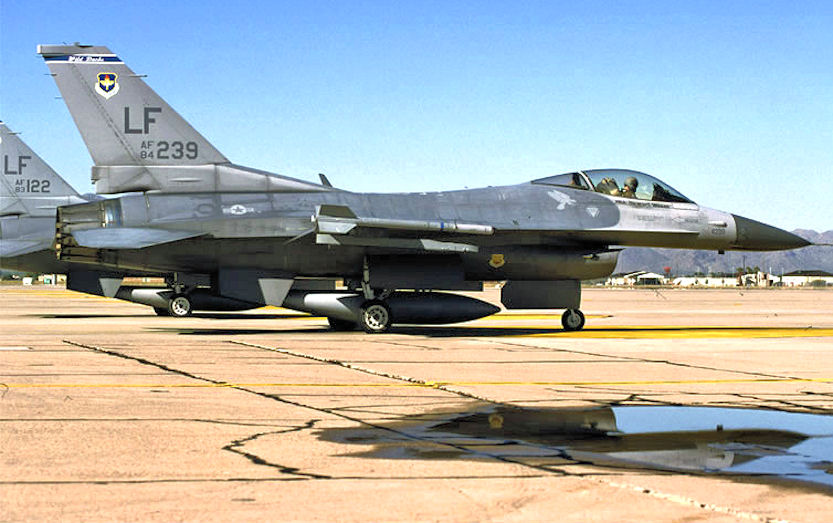
- Squadron F-16 Fighting Falcon at Luke AFB (Note: Aircraft is F-16C Block 25C serial 84-1239.)
- Active: 1942–1945; 1946–1993; 1994–present
- Country: United States
- Branch: United States Air Force
- Role: Fighter Training
- Part of: Air Combat Command
- Garrison/HQ: Luke Air Force Base
- Nickname: Wild Ducks
- Motto: Mad Mallards From Hell
- Mascot: Donald Duck holding a lightning bolt
- Engagements: Operation Avalanche
- Decorations: Distinguished Unit Citation; Presidential Unit Citation; Air Force Outstanding Unit Award with Combat "V" Device; Air Force Outstanding Unit Award; Republic of Vietnam Gallantry Cross with Palm

Insignia
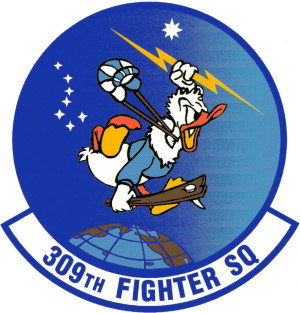
- 309th Fighter Squadron emblem (approved 3 November 1955)

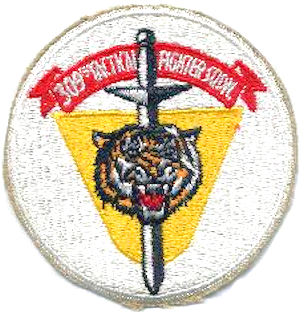
- Patch with unofficial 309th Tactical Fighter Squadron emblem

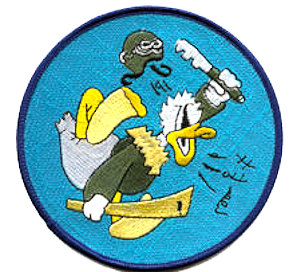
- 309th Fighter Squadron emblem (approved 27 November 1944)
- Tailband: Blue & White

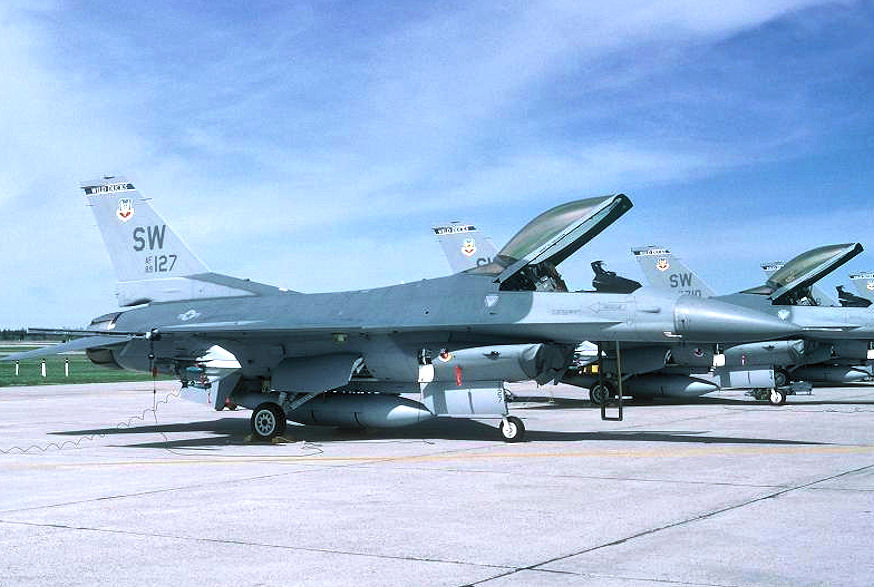
F-16C after being displaced from Homestead AFB, which was evacuated to Shaw in August 1992. Temporarily reassigned to the 363d FW, the tail codes were changed to "SW" when Homestead was destroyed by Hurricane Andrew and the squadron was reassigned to Shaw on a semi-permanent basis.

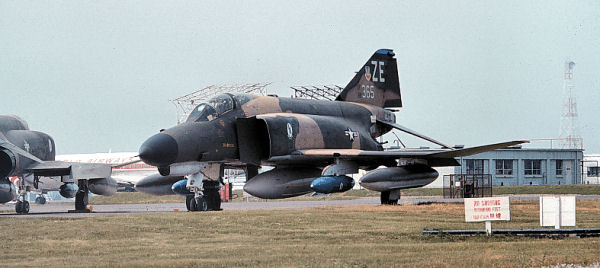
McDonnell Douglas F-4E Phantom of the 309th TFS, about 1971.

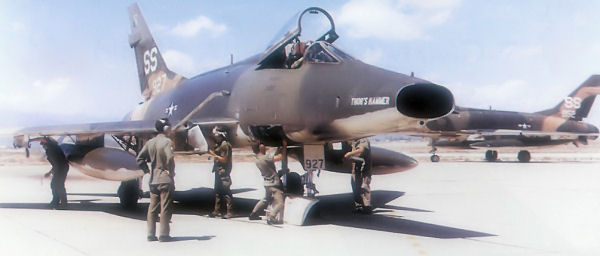
North American F-100D Super Sabres of the 309th TFS on the ramp at Tuy Hoa AB South Vietnam, April 1970.

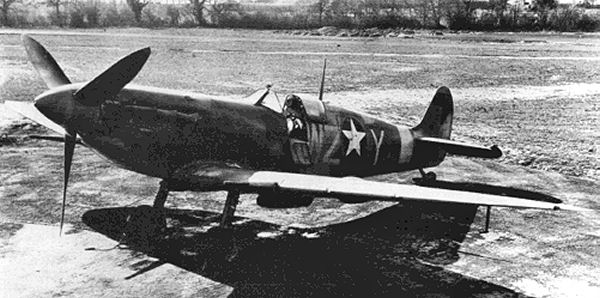
Spitfire V of the 309th Fighter Squadron

The 309th Fighter Squadron (309 FS) is part of the 56th Operations Group at Luke Air Force Base, Arizona. It operates the General Dynamics F-16 Fighting Falcon (F-16C and F-16D variants) aircraft conducting advanced fighter training.

== History ==
=== World War II ===
Initially established under Third Air Force in early 1942 as a fighter squadron at Baer Field, Indiana, flying some antisubmarine patrols in the Gulf of Mexico.

Deployed to the European Theater of Operations (ETO) in June 1942 without aircraft as its Curtiss P-40 Warhawks and Bell P-39 Airacobras were deemed unsuitable for use against German aircraft in long-range bomber escort duties. The squadron was re-equipped with RAF Supermarine Spitfire Mark Vs and its pilots and technicians spent a two-month period undergoing intensive training in flying and fighting with RAF pilots in the British aircraft from airfields in southeast England. The squadron flew its first combat mission on 18 August 1942, when it attacked enemy positions in occupied France.

Assigned to the new Twelfth Air Force and deployed to Gibraltar in November 1942 as part of the Operation Torch invasion forces, it initially operated from former Vichy French airfields in Algeria. It subsequently advanced east across Algeria and Tunisia during the Tunisian campaign, supporting the Fifth United States Army which halted Field Marshal Rommel's advance on allied positions.

Spitfires from the squadron provided support for the Allied invasion of Sicily and later the landings by Allied forces in mainland Italy, moving north supporting the Fifth Army during the Italian Campaign. As Allied bomber forces operating from Italy began the strategic bombing of Axis petroleum and communications facilities in central Europe and the Balkans, the squadron was re-equipped with the North American P-51 Mustang to replace the shorter-ranged Spitfire. In August 1944, the P-51's were involved in the invasion of Southern France.

By war's end, the squadron had earned two Distinguished Unit Citations and was involved in eight campaigns The squadron was largely demobilized during the summer of 1945 in Europe, a skeleton force returned to Drew Field, Florida in August, inactivating largely as an administrative unit in November.

Reactivated from elements of several inactivating organizations in Germany in August 1946, Performed occupation duty and operating early-model P-80A Shooting Star jets from former Luftwaffe jet-capable airfields at AAF Station Giebelstadt and AAF Station Kitzingen. Returned to the United States in June 1947 without personnel or equipment which remained in Germany.

=== Cold War ===
Assigned to Strategic Air Command at Langley Air Force Base, Virginia as a fighter-escort squadron, equipped with straight-winged Republic F-84E Thunderjets. Assigned to Turner Air Force Base, Georgia with mission of long-range escort of Boeing B-29 Superfortress bombers, later Boeing B-50 Superfortress and Convair B-36 Peacemakers as newer aircraft came into operation by SAC.

Relieved from assignment to SAC and made non-operational in 1957 with phaseout of B-36 and end of SAC escort fighter concept. On 1 April 1957 the parent 31 SFW was transferred back to Tactical Air Command and moved to George Air Force Base, California. Trained in tactical air support of ground forces, deploying to NATO bases for operational exercises. Reassigned to Homestead Air Force Base, Florida after the Cuban Missile Crisis, late 1962 to provide air defense of South Florida.

Was deployed to Southeast Asia, 1964 as part of advisory forces operating against North Vietnamese and Viet Cong forces in South Vietnam.

Reassigned back to TAC at Homestead AFB in 1970, as part of re-establishment of 31st TFW upon its return from duty in Southeast Asia. Equipped with McDonnell F-4E Phantom IIs. Was deployed to Thailand, July 1972, engaging North Vietnamese forces in northern South Vietnam in response to the communist spring offensive. Returned to the United States in the late fall 1972. For the next 20 years, performed routine training and tactical deployments from Homestead AFB. At the end of 1986 the squadron and wing changed tail codes from ZF to HS, which better matched the squadrons location in Homestead. Upgraded to the General Dynamics F-16A Fighting Falcon in 1988, upgrading to receive Shaw AFB block 25s in August 1990. The Gulf War build-up and the 363rd TFW at Shaw Air Force Base deploying to Saudi Arabia meant no more block 25s were available. With some F-16A/B block 15s still in service for the 309th TFS, it continued to operate both types.

When Desert Storm ended it was decided to convert the 31st TFW to block 40 F-16s instead. Up to that point about ten block 25s had reached the 309th FS. They were all sent to other units. Neither of the 31st TFW's other sister squadrons flew the block 25. In March 1991 the 309th began conversion to the block 40 version of the F-16. On 1 October 1991 the word 'Tactical' was dropped and the unit became the 309th Fighter Squadron. By early 1992 the conversion to block 40 F-16s with the general purpose role was complete.

=== Modern era ===
The squadron evacuated to Shaw Air Force Base, South Carolina, in August 1992, narrowly escaping the devastation of Hurricane Andrew. It was to be a temporary move to Moody, but Homestead was so heavily damaged it was never re-opened for any of the 31st FW squadrons After destruction of Homestead AFB, was reassigned permanently to the 363d Operations Group at Shaw. At this point the 'HS' tail code began to be replaced with a 'SW' tail code. When Shaw AFB began converting to the block 50 in 1993, even the 309th FS was involved receiving many examples. Although the squadron began converting to the block 50, it was short lived. The 20th FW at RAF Upper Heyford, England inactivated and moved its Wing and associate squadrons to Shaw AFB. On 31 December 1993 the 363d FW inactivated and the same day the 309th FS inactivated.

Plans were already in the works which involved moving the 309th Fighter Squadron to Luke Air Force Base, Arizona, where it would continue its heritage, this time as a training squadron under the 56th Fighter Wing. The Air Force reactivated the squadron on 1 April 1994, as with the block 25 version of the Viper.

The 309th produced 14 aces over the years, totaling 161 kills among them. The 309th also received numerous awards, including two Distinguished Unit Citations, one Presidential Unit Citation, two Air Force Outstanding Unit Awards with Combat "V" Device, two Air Force Outstanding Unit Awards, and one Republic of Vietnam Gallantry Cross with Palm. In addition, the squadron earned 25 campaign streamers from World War II through Southeast Asia. The squadron emblem is a 1944 Walt Disney production copyrighted design. It symbolizes the fighter mission celestial navigation pioneered by this squadron, its around-the-clock mission readiness, and its striking power.

On 1 March 2014, the 311th Fighter Squadron was reactivated as a part of the also newly reactivated 54th Fighter Group at Holloman Air Force Base, New Mexico. The 311th will operate F-16s currently flown by the 309th. Once all of the 309th's aircraft are transferred to Holloman, the squadron is planned to become inactivate for a time in preparation for Luke's transition to the F-35 Lightning II.

== Lineage ==
- Constituted as the 309th Pursuit Squadron (Interceptor) on 21 January 1942

Activated on 30 January 1942
Redesignated 309th Fighter Squadron on 15 May 1942
Redesignated 309th Fighter Squadron, Single Engine on 20 August 1943
Inactivated on 7 November 1945

- Activated on 20 August 1946

Redesignated 309th Fighter Squadron, Jet on 15 June 1948
Redesignated 309th Fighter-Bomber Squadron on 20 January 1950
Redesignated 309th Fighter-Escort Squadron on 16 July 1950
Redesignated 309th Strategic Fighter Squadron on 20 January 1953
Redesignated 309th Fighter-Bomber Squadron on 1 April 1957
Redesignated 309th Tactical Fighter Squadron on 1 July 1958
Redesignated 309th Tactical Fighter Training Squadron on 1 July 1982
Redesignated 309th Tactical Fighter Squadron on 1 October 1986
Redesignated 309th Fighter Squadron on 1 November 1991
Inactivated on 31 December 1993

- Activated on 1 April 1994

=== Assignments ===
- 31st Pursuit Group (later 31st Fighter Group), 30 January 1942 – 7 November 1945
- 31st Fighter Group (later 31st Fighter-Bomber Group, 31st Fighter-Escort Group), 20 August 1946 (attached to 31st Fighter-Escort Wing after 27 July 1951)
- 31st Fighter-Escort Wing (later 31st Strategic Fighter Wing, 31st Fighter-Bomber Wing, 31st Tactical Fighter Wing), 16 June 1952

Attached to Alaskan Air Command, 5 January – 9 February 1957
Attached to Unknown, 9 July – 15 November 1960 and 9 October – 26 November 1961
Attached to 18th Tactical Fighter Wing, 17 July – 22 December 1962 and 26 September – 30 December 1963
Attached to 7231st Combat Support Group, 5 August – 27 November 1964 and 18 January – 31 March 1966
Attached to 41st Tactical Group, 1–24 April 1966

- 4403d Tactical Fighter Wing, 9 October 1970
- 31st Tactical Fighter Wing (later 31st Tactical Training Wing, 31st Tactical Fighter Wing, 31st Fighter Wing), 30 October 1970
- 31st Operations Group, 1 November 1991

Attached to 363d Operations Group, 28 August – 30 September 1992

- 363d Fighter Wing, 1 October 1992 – 20 November 1992
- 363d Operations Group, 20 November 1992 – 31 December 1993
- 56th Operations Group, 1 April 1994 – present

=== Stations ===
- Baer Field, Indiana, 30 January 1942
- New Orleans Army Air Base, Louisiana, 6 February–19 May 1942
- RAF High Ercall (AAF-346), England, c. 12 June 1942
- RAF Westhampnett (AAF-352), England, 1 August–23 October 1942
- Tafaraoui Airfield, Algeria, 8 November 1942
- La Senia Airfield, Oran, Algeria, 14 November 1942
- Thelepte Airfield, Tunisia, 6 February 1943
- Tebessa Airfield, Algeria, 17 February 1943
- Youks-les-Bains Airfield, Algeria, 22 February 1943
- Kalaa Djerda Airfield, Tunisia, 26 February 1943
- Thelepte Airfield, Tunisia, 11 March 1943
- Djilma Airfield, Tunisia, 7 April 1943
- Le Sers Airfield, Tunisia, 12 April 1943
- Korba Airfield, Tunisia, 17 May 1943
- Ta' Lambert Aerodrome, Malta, 3 July 1943
- Ponte Olivo Airfield, Sicily, Italy, 13 July 1943
- Agrigento Airfield, Sicily, Italy, 21 July 1943
- Termini Imerese, Sicily, Italy, 5 August 1943
- Milazzo Airfield, Sicily, Italy, 5 September 1943
- Montecorvino Airfield, Italy, 21 September 1943
- Pomigliano Airfield, Italy, 14 October 1943
- Castel Volturno Airfield, Italy, c. 19 January 1944
- San Severo Airfield, Italy, 4 April 1944
- Mondolfo Airfield, Italy, 4 March 1945
- Triolo Airfield, Italy, 15 July–5 August 1945
- Drew Field, Florida, August–7 November 1945
- AAF Station Giebelstadt, Germany, 20 August 1946
- AAF Station Kitzingen, Germany, c. 30 September 1946 – 25 June 1947
- Langley Field, Virginia, 25 June 1947
- Turner Field (later Turner Air Force Base), Georgia, 4 September 1947

Deployed to RAF Manston, England 26 December 1950 – 25 July 1951
Deployed to Misawa Air Base, Japan 20 July – 16 October 1952, 7 November 1953 – 9 February 1954
Deployed to Eielson Air Force Base, Alaska 5 January – 9 February 1957

- George Air Force Base, California, 15 March 1959

Deployed to Aviano Air Base, Italy 9 July – 15 November 1960
Deployed to Spangdahlem Air Base, Germany 9 October – 26 November 1961

- Homestead Air Force Base, Florida, 1 June 1962 – 13 December 1966

Deployed to Kadena Air Base, Okinawa 7 July–22 December 1962
Deployed to Itazuke Air Base, Japan 26 September–31 December 1963
Deployed to Cigli Air Base, Turkey 5 August–27 November 1964, 18 January–24 April 1966

- Tuy Hoa Air Base, South Vietnam, 16 December 1966 – October 1970
- England Air Force Base, Louisiana, c. 9 October 1970
- Homestead Air Force Base, Florida, 30 October 1970 (operated from Shaw Air Force Base South Carolina after 23 August 1992)
- Shaw Air Force Base, South Carolina, 1 October 1992 – 31 December 1993
- Luke Air Force Base, Arizona, 1 April 1994 – present)

=== Aircraft ===
- Curtiss P-40 Warhawk (1942)
- Bell P-39 Airacobra (1942)
- Supermarine Spitfire (1942–1943)
- North American P-51 Mustang (1943–1945, 1947–1948)
- Lockheed F-80 Shooting Star (1946–1947)
- Republic F-84 Thunderjet (1948–1957)
- North American F-100 Super Sabre (1957–1970)
- McDonnell F-4 Phantom II (1970–1986)
- General Dynamics F-16 Fighting Falcon (1986–1993, 1994 – 2025)
