= 308th Fighter Squadron =

US Air Force unit

308th Fighter Squadron

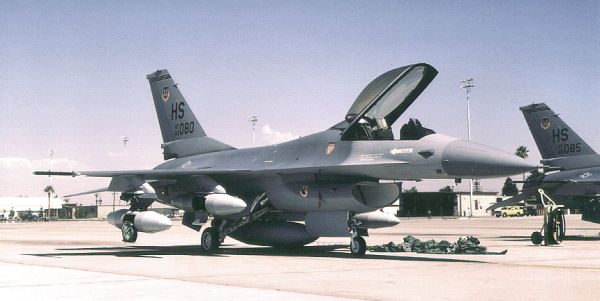
- Squadron F-16A Fighting Falcon (Note: Aircraft is General Dynamics F-16A Block 15Q Fighting Falcon Serial 83-1080, about 1988.)
- Active: 1942–1945; 1946–2015; 2018–
- Country: United States
- Branch: United States Air Force
- Role: Fighter Training
- Part of: Air Combat Command
- Nickname: Emerald Knights
- Engagements: Operation Torch; Operation Husky; Operation Dragoon
- Decorations: Distinguished Unit Citation; Presidential Unit Citation; Air Force Outstanding Unit Award with Combat "V" Device; Air Force Outstanding Unit Award; Republic of Vietnam Gallantry Cross with Palm

Insignia
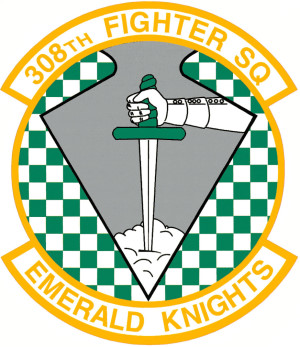
- 308th Fighter Squadron emblem

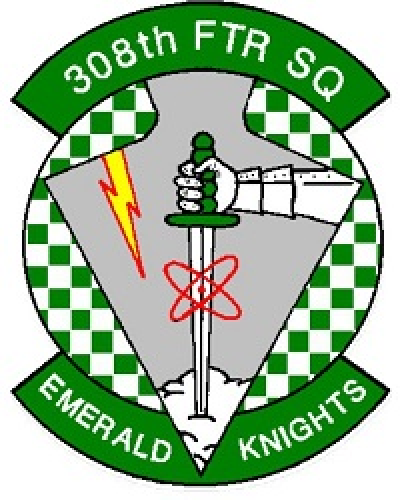
- 308th Tactical Fighter Squadron emblem(approved 10 January 1962)

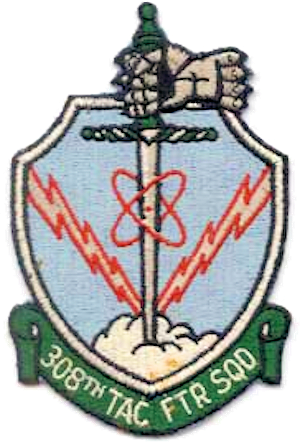
- Patch with 308th Fighter-Bomber Squadron emblem (approved 14 May 1957)

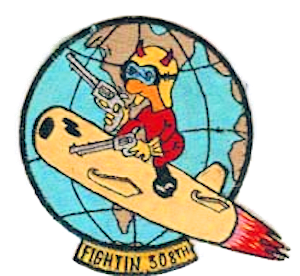
- 308th Strategic Fighter Squadron emblem (approved 7 March 1952)

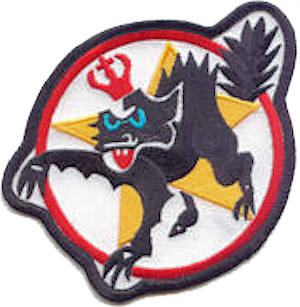
- 308th Fighter Squadron emblem (World War II) (Note: Apparently never approved. See Endicott, p. 719 (listing approved emblems).)

The 308th Fighter Squadron is an active United States Air Force unit. It is part of the 56th Operations Group at Luke Air Force Base, Arizona, where it trains pilots on the Lockheed Martin F-35A.

== History ==
=== World War II ===
Initially established under Third Air Force in early 1942 as a fighter squadron at Baer Field, Indiana, flying some antisubmarine patrols in the Gulf of Mexico.

Deployed to the European Theater of Operations in June 1942 without aircraft as its P-40s and P-39s were deemed unsuitable for use against German aircraft in long-range bomber escort duties. Was re-equipped with RAF Supermarine Spitfire Vs and its pilots and technicians spent a two-month period undergoing intensive training in flying and fighting with RAF pilots in the British aircraft from airfields in southeast England. The squadron flew its first combat mission on 18 August 1942, when it attacked enemy positions in occupied France.

Assigned to the new Twelfth Air Force and deployed to Gibraltar in November 1942 as part of the Operation Torch invasion forces, initially operating from former Vichy French airfields in Algeria. Advanced east across Algeria and Tunisia during the North African Campaign, supporting the Fifth United States Army which halted Field Marshal Rommel's advance on allied positions.

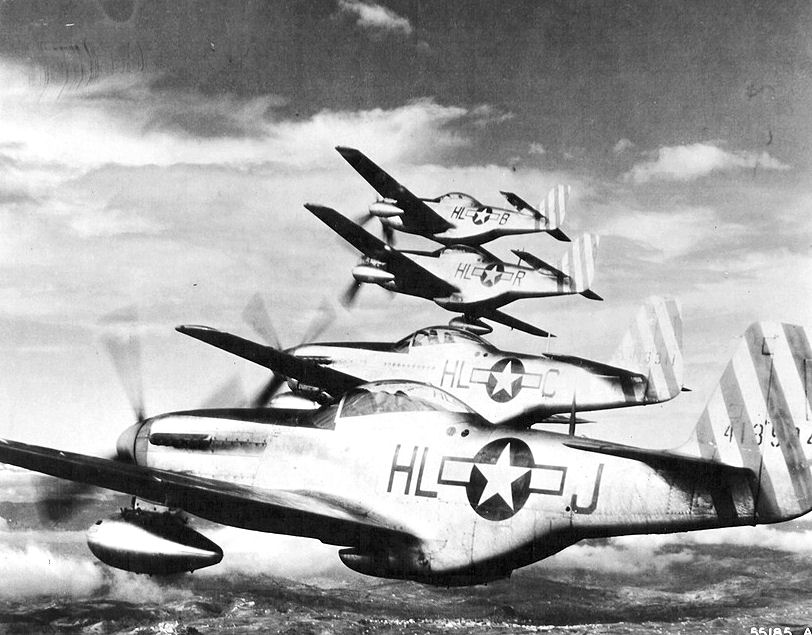
308th FS, May 1944, P-51D-5-NA Mustang 44-13524 in foreground

Spitfires from the squadron provided support for Allied Forces as the Invasion of Italy began with the capture of Sicily, and later the landings by Allied forces in Fascist Italy, moving north supporting the Fifth Army during the Italian Campaign. As Allied bomber forces operating from Italy began the strategic bombing of Axis petroleum and communications facilities in central Europe and the Balkans, the squadron was re-equipped with the North American P-51 Mustang to replace the shorter-ranged Spitfire. In August 1944, the P-51's were involved in the invasion of Southern France. In December 1944, the first destruction of a German jet fighter by a 308th P-51 occurred, eventually operating from the Po Valley in Northern Italy at the end of the European War in May 1945.

By war's end, the squadron had earned two Distinguished Unit Citations and was involved in eight campaigns The squadron was largely demobilized during the summer of 1945 in Europe, a skeleton force returned to Drew Field, Florida in August, inactivating largely as an administrative unit in November.

Reactivated from elements of several inactivating organizations in Germany in August 1946, Performed occupation duty and operating early-model P-80A Shooting Star jets from former Luftwaffe jet-capable airfields at Giebelstadt and Kitzingen. Returned to the United States in June 1947 without personnel or equipment which remained in Germany.

=== Cold War ===
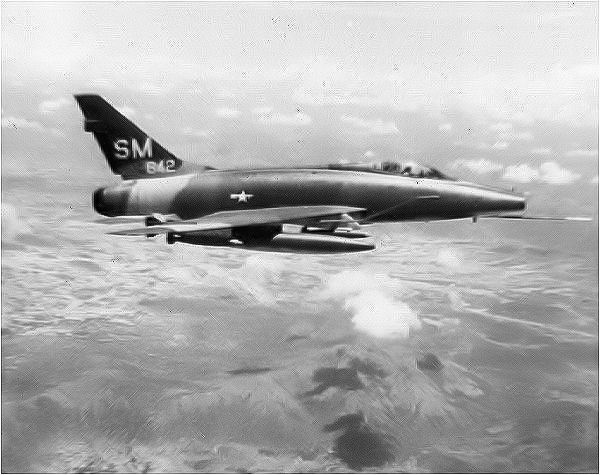
North American F-100D-25-NA Super Sabre Serial 55-3642 of the 308th Tactical Fighter Squadron.

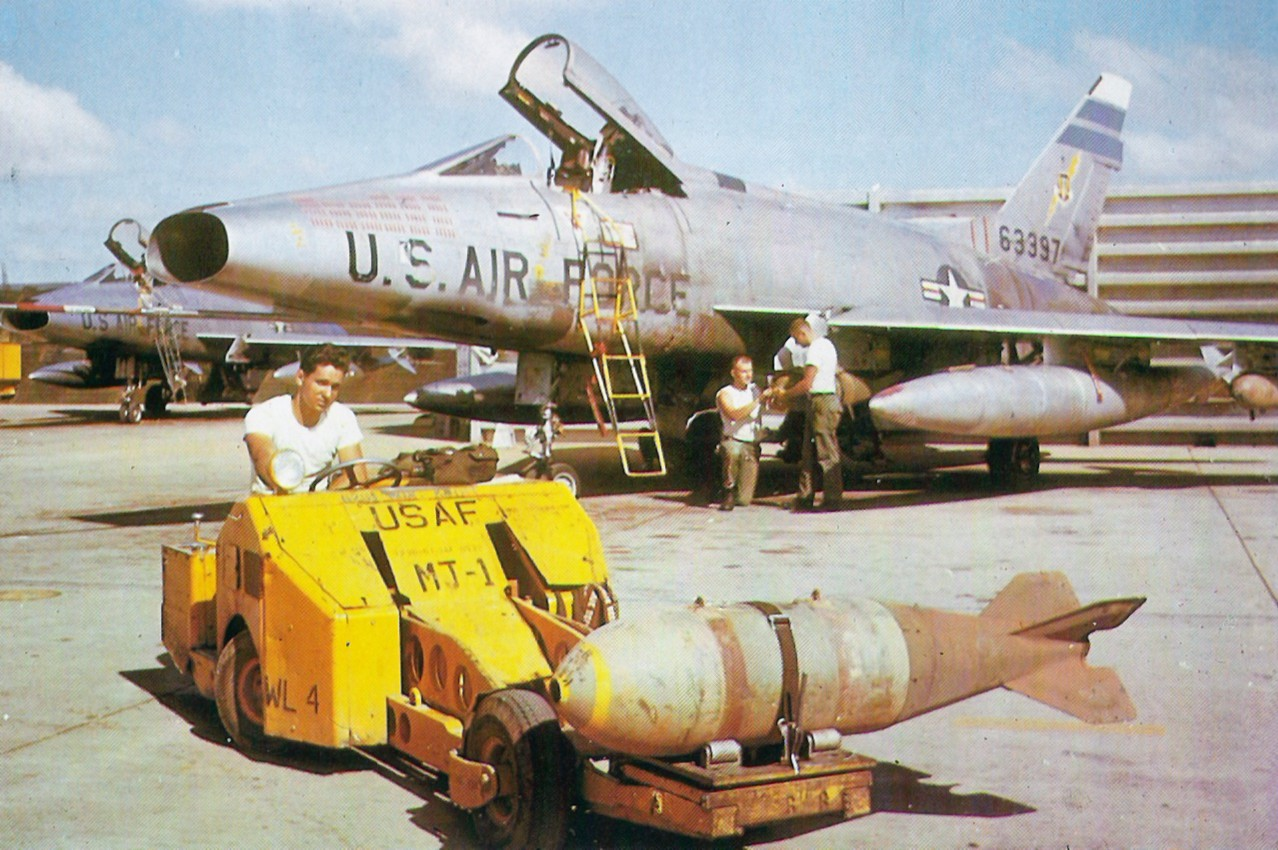
F-100D s/n 56-3397 in a revetment, Tuy Hoa AB, Vietnam, with a munitions jammer loading a M117 bomb

Assigned to Strategic Air Command at Langley Field, Virginia as a fighter-escort squadron, equipped with straight-winged Republic F-84E Thunderjets. Assigned to Turner Air Force Base, Georgia with mission of long-range escort of Boeing B-29 Superfortress bombers, later Boeing B-50 Superfortresses and Convair B-36 Peacemakers as newer aircraft came into operation by SAC.

Relieved from assignment to SAC and made non-operational in 1957 with phaseout of B-36 and end of SAC escort fighter concept. On 1 April 1957 the parent 31 SFW was transferred back to Tactical Air Command and moved to George Air Force Base, California. Trained in tactical air support of ground forces, deploying to NATO bases for operational exercises. Reassigned to Homestead Air Force Base, Florida after the Cuban Missile Crisis, late 1962 to provide air defense of South Florida. On 8 February 1964 the 308th Fighter Squadron flew a non-stop mission from Homestead to Cigli Air Base, Turkey. The 6,600-mile trip required eight in-flight refuelings and set a new record for the longest mass flight of jet aircraft to cross the Atlantic. The flight also led to the wing receiving the Tactical Air Command Outstanding Fighter Wing Award for 1964, the second consecutive year it won that prestigious award.

Was deployed to Southeast Asia, 1965 as part of advisory forces operating against North Vietnamese and National Liberation Front forces in South Vietnam. For its efforts in Southeast Asia from 2 December 1965 to 15 October 1970, the 308th was awarded the Republic of Vietnam Gallantry Cross with Palm. The 308th Fighter Squadron also won the Air Force Outstanding Unit Award with Combat "V" Device.

Reassigned back to TAC at Homestead in 1970, as part of re-establishment of 31st TFW upon its return from duty in Southeast Asia. Equipped with McDonnell F-4E Phantom IIs. Was deployed to Thailand, July 1972, engaging North Vietnamese forces in northern South Vietnam in response to the communist spring offensive. Returned to the United States in the late fall, 1972. For the next 20 years, performed routine training and tactical deployments from Homestead AFB. At the end of 1986 the squadron and wing changed tail codes from ZF to HS which better matched the squadron's location in Homestead. Upgraded to the General Dynamics F-16A Fighting Falcon in 1988, upgrading to receive Shaw AFB block 25s in August 1990. With the Gulf War build up and the 363rd TFW at Shaw AFB deploying to Saudi Arabia meant no more block 25s were available. With some F-16A/B block 15s still in service for the 308th TFS, it continued to operate both types.

=== Modern era ===
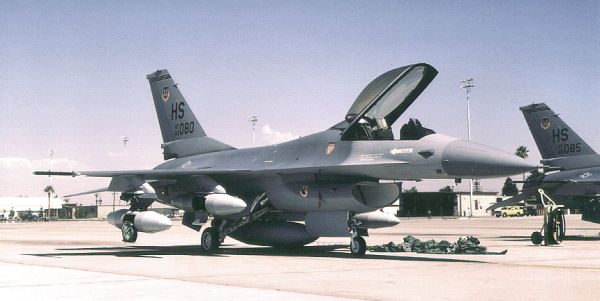
General Dynamics F-16A Block 15Q Fighting Falcon AF Serial No. 83-1080 of the 308th FS, about 1988.

When Desert Storm ended it was decided to convert the 31st TFW to block 40 F-16s instead. Up to this point about ten block 25s had reached the 308th FS and had been painted in 'Emerald Knight' markings. They were all sent to other units. Neither of the 31st TFWs other sister squadrons flew the block 25. In March 1991 the 308th began conversion to the block 40 version of the F-16. On 1 October 1991 the word 'Tactical' was dropped and unit became the 308th Fighter Squadron. By early 1992 the conversion to block 40 F-16s with the general purpose role was complete.

Moved to Moody AFB, Georgia in late August 1992 when Hurricane Andrew threatened South Florida. It was to be a temporary move to Moody, but Homestead was so heavily damaged it was never re-opened for any of the 31st FW squadrons After destruction of Homestead AFB, was reassigned permanently to the 347th Operations Group at Moody. At this point the 'HS' tail code began to be replaced with a 'MY' tail code. In fact some block 40 F-16s were delivered right from the factory to the 308th Fighter Squadron's new home base. It deployed to Saudi Arabia from, March–June 1995 in support of Operation Southern Watch.

On 1 April 1994 the unit reassigned to Luke Air Force Base, Arizona where it became a training unit. Training by the 308th FS is not a typical syllabus as the 308th FS is the main training hub for turning out instructor pilots. The 'Emerald Knights' mission is to ' Train . . . F-16 pilots and deploy combat ready airmen...' The role of training instructor pilots is not exclusive and the 308th FS still has classes of crew which are new to the Viper.

The 308th ranks tenth as the most highly decorated unit in Air Force history among the 152 fighter squadrons that were ever active. Since 1942, it has served around the world from Southeast Asia to Europe.

=== Fighter Training ===
The 308th ("Emerald Knights", Tailband: Green & White (checkerboard)), flew Block 42 F-16C/Ds conducting F-16 Fighting Falcon training for active duty USAF pilots.

On 25 June 2015 the unit inactivated.

On 5 December 2018, the USAF reactivated the 308th Fighter Squadron as an F-35A Lightning II training unit, primarily training F-35 crew for the Royal Danish Air Force and Royal Netherlands Air Force at Luke Air Force Base.

== Lineage ==
- Constituted as the 308th Pursuit Squadron (Interceptor) on 21 January 1942

Activated on 30 January 1942
Redesignated 308th Fighter Squadron on 25 May 1942
Redesignated 308th Fighter Squadron, Single Engine on 20 August 1943
Inactivated on 7 November 1945

- Activated on 20 August 1946

Redesignated 308th Fighter Squadron, Jet on 15 June 1948
Redesignated 308th Fighter-Bomber Squadron on 20 January 1950
Redesignated 308th Fighter-Escort Squadron on 16 July 1950
Redesignated 308th Strategic Fighter Squadron on 20 January 1953
Redesignated 308th Fighter-Bomber Squadron on 1 April 1957
Redesignated 308th Tactical Fighter Squadron on 1 July 1958
Redesignated 308th Tactical Fighter Training Squadron on 9 October 1980
Redesignated 308th Tactical Fighter Squadron on 1 October 1986
Redesignated 308th Fighter Squadron on 1 November 1991
Inactivated on 25 June 2015

- Activated on 30 November 2018

=== Assignments ===
- 31st Pursuit Group (later 31st Fighter Group), 30 January 1942 – 7 November 1945
- 31st Fighter Group (later 31st Fighter-Bomber Group, 31st Fighter Escort Group), 20 August 1946 (attached to 31st Fighter-Escort Wing after 27 July 1951)
- 31st Fighter-Escort Wing (later 31st Strategic Fighter Wing, 31st Fighter-Bomber Wing, 31st Tactical Fighter Wing), 16 June 1952

Attached to Alaskan Air Command, 5 December 1956 – 7 January 1957
Attached to Unknown, 15–21 August 1958, 22 August 1958 – 19 January 1959, 11 July-c. Dec 1959, 7 March-c. 19 July 1961
Attached to 18th Tactical Fighter Wing, 13 March – 30 April 1963
Attached to Unknown, 1 May – 3 July 1963
Attached to 7231 Combat Support Group, 9 February – 5 May 1964 and 9 March – 8 July 1965

- 3d Tactical Fighter Wing, 2 December 1965 (attached to 31st Tactical Fighter Wing after 15 November 1966)
- 31st Tactical Fighter Wing, 25 December 1966
- 4403d Tactical Fighter Wing, 5 October 1970
- 31st Tactical Fighter Wing, 30 October 1970 (attached to 432d Tactical Reconnaissance Wing, 28 April – 29 July 1972, 8th Tactical Fighter Wing, 11 December 1972 – 11 June 1973)
- 31st Operations Group, 1 November 1991 (attached to 347th Operations Group after c. 11 September 1992)
- 347th Operations Group, 20 November 1992
- 56th Operations Group, 1 April 1994 – 25 June 2015; 30 November 2018–

=== Stations ===
- Baer Field, Indiana, 30 January 1942
- New Orleans Army Air Base, Louisiana, 6 February 1942 – 19 May 1942
- RAF Atcham (AAF-342), England, 10 June 1942
- RAF Kenley (AAF-348), England, 1 August 1942
- RAF Westhampnett (AAF-352), England, 25 August 1942 – 23 October 1942
- Tafaraoui Airfield, Algeria, 8 November 1942 (operated From: Casablanca Airfield, French Morocco 10–31 January 1943)
- Thelepte Airfield, Tunisia, 7 February 1943
- Tebessa Airfield, Algeria, 17 February 1943
- Canrobert Airfield, Algeria, 21 February 1943
- Kalaa Djerda Airfield, Tunisia, 25 February 1943
- Djilma Airfield, Tunisia, 7 April 1943
- Le Sers Airfield, Tunisia, 12 April 1943
- Korba Airfield, Tunisia, 20 May 1943
- Ta' Lambert Aerodrome, Malta, 30 June 1943
- Ponte Olivo Airfield, Sicily, Italy, 14 July 1943
- Agrigento Airfield, Sicily, Italy, 19 July 1943
- Termini Imerese, Sicily, Italy, 2 August 1943)
- Milazzo Airfield, Sicily, Italy, 2 September 1943
- Montecorvino Airfield, Italy, 14 October 1943
- Pomigliano Airfield, Italy, 14 October 1943
- Castel Volturno Airfield, Italy, 14 January 1944
- San Severo Airfield, Italy, 2 April 1944
- Mondolfo Airfield, Italy, 3 March 1945
- Triolo Airfield, Italy, 14 July 1945 – 5 August 1945
- Drew Field, Florida, 25 August 1945 – 7 November 1945
- AAF Station Giebelstadt, Germany, 20 August 1946)
- AAF Station Kitzingen, Germany, 30 September 1946
- Langley Field, Virginia (25 June 1947)
- Turner Field (later Turner Air Force Base), Georgia, 4 September 1947

Deployed to RAF Manston, England (26 December 1950 – 25 July 1951)
Deployed to Misawa Air Base, Japan, 20 July–16 October 1952
Deployed to Chitose Air Base, Japan, 7 November 1953 – 9 February 1954
Deployed to Eielson Air Force Base, Alaska, 5 December 1956 – 7 January 1957)
Deployed to Hahn Air Base, Germany, 15–21 August 1958
Deployed to Aviano Air Base, Italy (22 August 1958 – 19 January 1959)

- George Air Force Base, California, 15 March 1959

Deployed to Moron Air Base, Spain, 11 July– c. December 1959
Deployed to Aviano Air Base, Italy (7 March – c. 19 July 1961)

- Homestead Air Force Base, Florida, 1 October 1965

Deployed to Kadena Air Base, Okinawa (13 March–30 April 1963)
Deployed to Itazuke Air Base, Japan, 1 May–3 July 1963
Deployed to Cigli Air Base, Turkey, 9 February–5 May 1964; 9 March–8 July 1965

- Bien Hoa Air Base, South Vietnam, 2 December 1965
- Tuy Hoa Air Base, South Vietnam, 25 December 1966
- England Air Force Base, Louisiana, 5 October 1970
- Homestead Air Force Base, Florida, 30 October 1970

Deployed to Udorn Royal Thai Air Force Base, Thailand, 28 April–29 July 1972
Deployed to Ubon Royal Thai Air Force Base, Thailand, 11 December 1972 – 11 June 1973

- Moody Air Force Base, Georgia, 20 November 1992
- Luke Air Force Base, Arizona, 1 April 1994 – 15 June 2015; 30 November 2018–

=== Aircraft ===
- Curtiss P-40 Warhawk (1942)
- Bell P-39 Airacobra (1942)
- Supermarine Spitfire (1942–1943)
- North American P-51 Mustang (1943–1945, 1947–1949)
- Lockheed F-80 Shooting Star (1946–1947)
- Republic F-84 Thunderjet (1948–1957)
- North American F-100 Super Sabre (1957–1970)
- McDonnell F-4 Phantom II (1970–1986)
- General Dynamics F-16 Fighting Falcon (1986–2015)
- Lockheed Martin F-35A Lighting II (2018-)
