= Termini Airfield =

Abandoned World War II military airfield on Sicily

Termini Airfield
- Part of Twelfth Air Force

Site information
- Type: Military airfield
- Controlled by: Regia Aeronautica 1940-1943 United States Army Air Forces 09/1943

Location
- Coordinates: 37°59′18.91″N 013°40′12.95″E

Site history
- Built: 1940
- In use: 1943

Location of Termini Airfield, Italy

Termini Airfield is an abandoned World War II military airfield on Sicily, located approximately 6 km East of Termini Imerese harbour.

This airfield - placed in Canne Masche - was used by Regia Aeronautica as emergency airfield till September 1943; after Allied's arriving it was rebuilt by the XII Engineer Command using a graded earth compacted surface, with a prefabricated hessian (burlap) surfacing known as PHS. PHS was made of an asphalt-impregnated jute which was rolled out over the compacted surface over a square mesh track (SMT) grid of wire joined in 3-inch squares. Pierced Steel Planking was also used for parking areas, as well as for dispersal sites, when it was available. In addition, tents were used for billeting and also for support facilities; an access road was built to the existing road infrastructure; a dump for supplies, ammunition, and gasoline drums, along with a drinkable water and minimal electrical grid for communications and station lighting; the XII Engineer Command built another airfield in contrada Pistavecchia 12km East from Termini Imerese harbour, close to Campofelice di Roccella town.

Once completed it was turned over for use by the Twelfth Air Force 31st Fighter Group from 2 August to 2 September 1943, during the liberation of Sicily, before moving up to Milazzo in eastern Sicily to take part in the Invasion of Italy.

The airfield was used by the Italian S 79 aircraft carrying the diplomatic Mission designed to firm the Unconditional Surrender/Armistizio at Cassibile on September 3 1943

With the Americans pulling out, engineers dismantled the airfield. Today, there appears to be traces of the airfield in a flat.
