= Gourgion Tower =

- It-Torri ta' Gourgion; It-Torri Gorġun
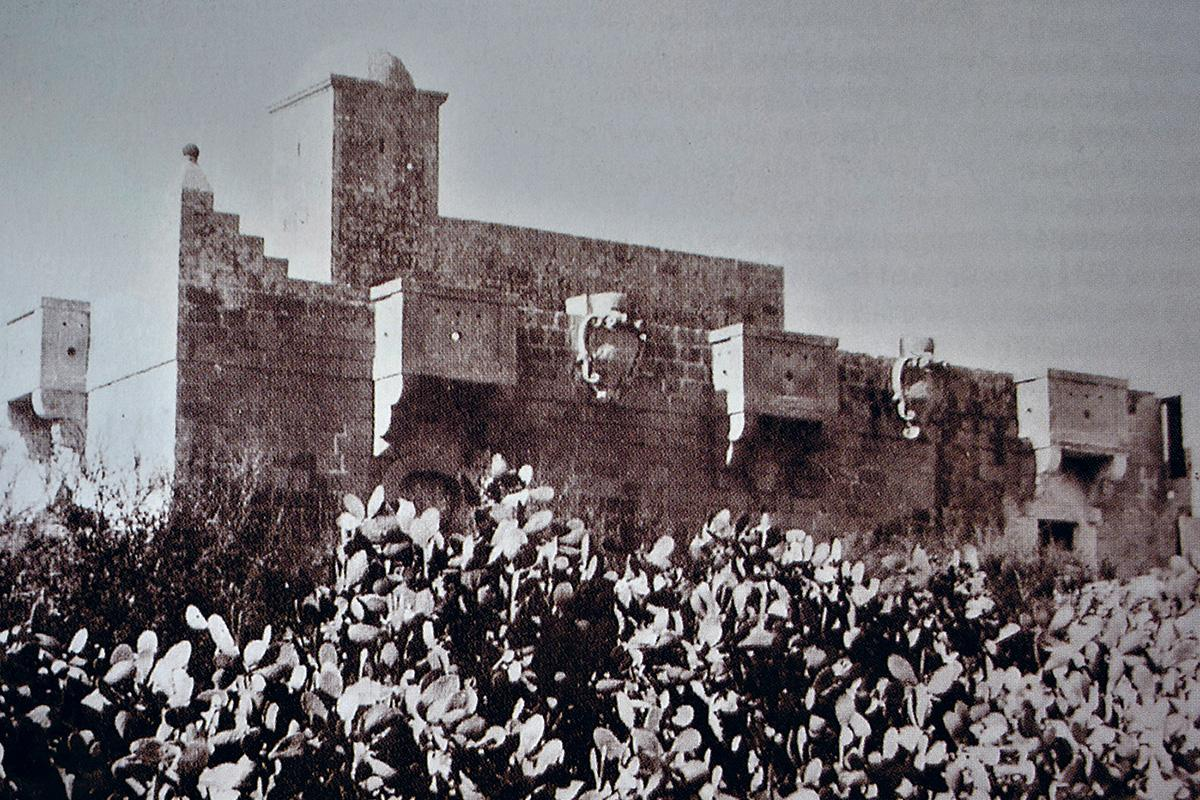
- Gourgion Tower in the 1920s

General information
- Status: Demolished
- Type: Farmhouse, Fortified house
- Location: Xewkija, Gozo, Malta
- Coordinates: 36°1′47.8″N 14°15′46.6″E
- Named for: Giovanni Gourgion
- Completed: 1690
- Demolished: 16–20 June 1943

Technical details
- Material: Limestone

Gourgion Tower (Maltese: It-Torri ta' Gourgion or It-Torri Gorġun, Italian: Torre Gourgion) was a fortified house in the outskirts of Xewkija, Gozo, Malta. The tower was built by Giovanni Gourgion in 1690, and it became a symbol of the village of Xewkija. Despite being listed on the Antiquities List in 1925, it was demolished by American forces in 1943 to make way for an airfield for the Allied invasion of Sicily.

== History ==
Gourgion Tower was built by and named after Giovanni Gourgion, a Gozitan nobleman who had made a fortune in corsairing against Ottoman shipping, and who was the personal secretary of Grand Masters Gregorio Carafa and Adrien de Wignacourt. The tower was completed in 1690, and served as the centrepiece of Gourgion's estates and a farmhouse in Gozo. According to tradition, Grand Master Wignacourt himself attended the opening ceremony of the tower, but this is unlikely since it is not recorded in any archives.

In 1798, during the French occupation of Malta, some of the coats of arms at Gourgion Tower were defaced by French forces. Some alterations were made to the structure over the years, including the addition of a room on the first floor.

The tower was listed on the Antiquities List of 1925.

=== Demolition ===
The tower was demolished between 16 and 20 June 1943 to make way for Runway No. 1 of the Ta' Lambert Airfield. The demolition work was carried out by American servicemen from the Company E of the 21st Engineer Aviation Regiment, as well as 300 Gozitan labourers. The airfield was inaugurated on 23 June, and was used during the Allied invasion of Sicily which started on 9 July. It became redundant on 14 July, when American aircraft moved to the Ponte Olivo Airfield in Sicily. The last planes left on 19 July, and the airfield was cleared back to agricultural land in June 1944.

According to some sources, Gourgion Tower was dismantled not demolished, and the Americans marked all the stones so the tower could be rebuilt. When the airfield was cleared in 1944, the authorities reportedly asked the owners if they wanted the tower rebuilt or financial compensation, and the owners chose the second option. However, this claim is not verified in any documented source.

Many of the tower's inscriptions and decorated stones were retrieved by Lawrence Zammit Haber. These were later donated to the Gozo Museum of Archaeology, where they were displayed for a number of years, but were later removed and are now in storage at Heritage Malta.

== Architecture ==
The Gourgion Tower was meant to serve both as a country retreat and a defensive position, so it was largely utilitarian in nature. The structure was rectangular, and its architecture had similarities to the Bubaqra Tower on mainland Malta. A notable feature of the tower was a domed stair-hood, which was similar to echauguettes found in the Hospitaller fortifications of Malta. The tower also contained eight balcony-like structures, which were similar to the machicolation, found in earlier structures such as Gauci Tower, and to a Mashrabiya. The design derived from architecture of the Middle East, and evolved to local interpretation.

The tower's façade had musketry loopholes, and was decorated with the coats of arms of Gourgion, Carafa and Wignacourt, as well as a number of inscriptions and other sculptures. The three coats of arms were defaced during the French occupation.

Gourgion's estates near the tower were surrounded by a boundary wall, which also contained a number of inscriptions and an ornate public well.
