= Ta' Lambert Aerodrome =

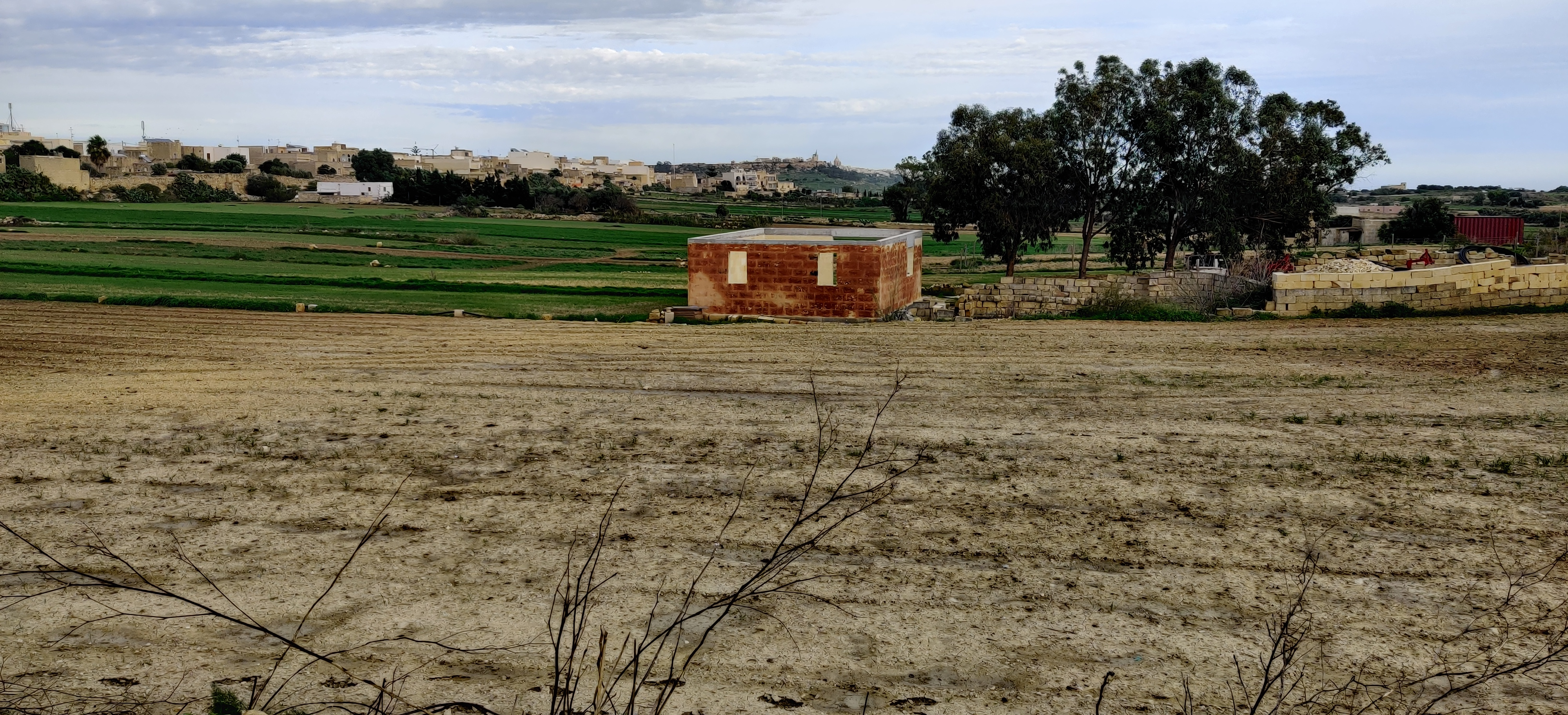
- IATA: none; ICAO: none; GPS: 36.030820, 14.264878

Summary
- Airport type: Military
- Operator: United States Army Air Forces
- In use: June 1943 to August 1943
- Interactive map of Ta' Lambert Aerodrome

Runways
Direction	Length		Surface
Direction	ft	m	Surface
	4,000	1,219	Compacted Soil

Ta' Lambert is an airfield on the island of Gozo, Malta. Between June and August 1943, it was used to assist American squadrons in their invasion of Sicily, code-named Operation Husky.

== Construction and Operational History ==
The hilly terrain Gozo poses, made the construction of a sufficiently long runway particularly difficult and after consideration the ta' Lambert area was chosen. Within six days the terrain was cleared of rubble walls, shrubs and famously, Gourgion Tower, which was reportedly dismantled but never rebuilt. In the process, 300 Gozitan citizens participated in the construction effort, with equipment made available by the American forces. By mid-June, two 4,000 feet (1,200 m)-long compacted soil runways intersecting in a 'Y' shape were built extending from Xewkija to the outskirts of Għajnsielem. Care was immediately taken to install sufficient anti-aircraft artillery units, Bezzina listing stations in Sannat, Ta' Ċenċ, Qala and Xagħra. The runway was considered operational on 22 June and on 23 June, the first Supermarine Spitfires landed.

In its short operational history, the aerodrome hosted Spitfires Mk Vs of the 307th, 308th and 309th fighter squadrons under the command of Lt. Col. Fred M. Dean. While not much is known of the day-to-day running of the aerodrome, there was one notable incident. As Edward L. Fardella was landing his Spitfire, he collided into a stationary Spitfire, killing two British commandoes. The pilot survived the incident. Over the span of two months, a total of four United States Army Air Forces pilots failed to return while on mission from Ta' Lambert.

The prospects of extending the use of the aerodrome through the winter posed its own set of challenges, notably rain which would have made the area too muddy for practical use. By late July 1943 the last Spitfires had departed from the aerodrome, the site falling into disrepair. The land was later handed back to their owners for cultivation and the airfield was cleared back to agricultural land in June 1944.
