= 31st Operations Group =

US Air Force unit

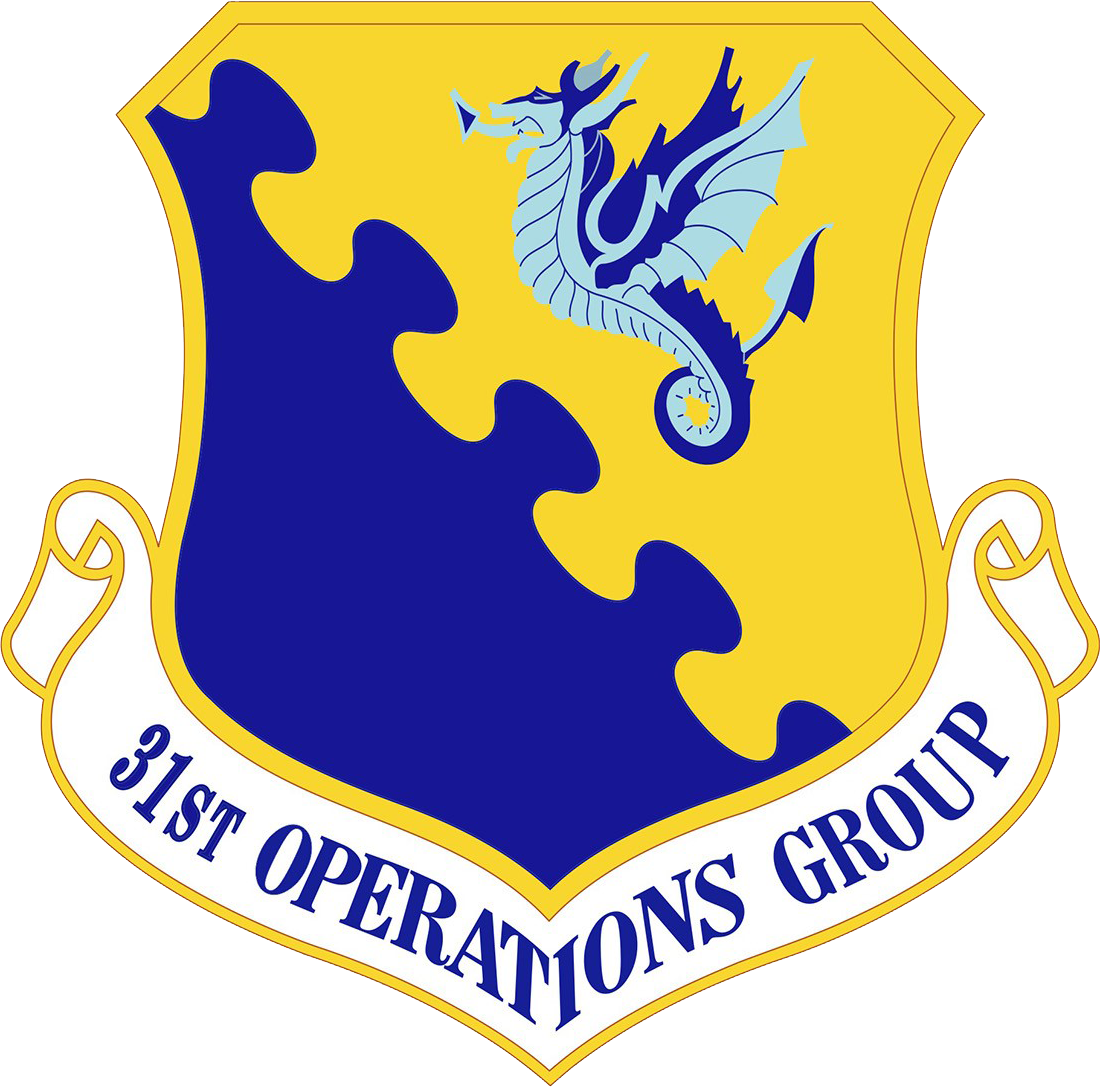
- Group emblem
- Active: 1940–1952; 1991–1994; 1994 – present
- Country: United States
- Branch: United States Air Force
- Type: Dependent group
- Role: Multirole combat; Combat search and rescue
- Part of: 31st Fighter Wing
- Base: Aviano Air Base, Italy
- Motto: Return with honor
- Website: Official website

Commanders
- Current commander: Colonel Joseph S. Miranda
- Notable commanders: Carroll W. McColpin

Insignia
- Tail code: AV

Aircraft flown
- Fighter: F-16CG Fighting Falcon
- Multirole helicopter: HH-60W Jolly Green II

The 31st Operations Group is the flying component of the 31st Fighter Wing, assigned to the United States Air Forces in Europe. It is stationed at Aviano Air Base, Italy.

The 31st Operations Group ensures the combat readiness of two F-16CG Falcon squadrons, one air control squadron, and one operational support squadron conducting and supporting worldwide air operations. The group prepares fighter pilots, controllers, and support personnel to execute U.S. and NATO war plans and contingency operations.

It trains, equips, plans, and provides weather, intelligence, standardization/evaluation, and command and control sustaining global flying operations.

== Components ==
The 31st Operations Group was reactivated in late October 1991 at Homestead Air Force Base, Florida. The 31st Tactical Fighter Wing received new equipment the previous March in the form of Block 40 F-16C/D Fighting Falcons and in October of that year the wing resumed its original title (one month short of 44 years since the unit had formed) of 31st Fighter Wing, with the 31 OG as its flying component.

On 24 August 1992 the effects of Hurricane Andrew severely damaged Homestead. The group's three F-16 squadrons were relocated to Moody Air Force Base, Georgia (and eventually reassigned to other units) and the base declared non-operational because of the damage caused by the hurricane. The result of this was the reassignment of the 31st from Air Combat Command Ninth Air Force to United States Air Forces Europe's Sixteenth Air Force on 31 March 1994 without personnel or equipment. The 31st replaced the 401st Tactical Fighter Wing at Aviano Air Base, Italy, and the wing received two new fighter Squadrons, the 510th "Buzzards" and 555th Fighter Squadrons "Triple Nickel". These squadrons were initially unequipped, but the 512th and 526th Fighter Squadrons, of the 86th Fighter Wing at Ramstein Air Base, Germany, which were equipped with F-16CG/DG Block-40s were inactivated as the 86th Wing became an airlift organization. These squadrons transferred their equipment and personnel to the new squadrons at Aviano.

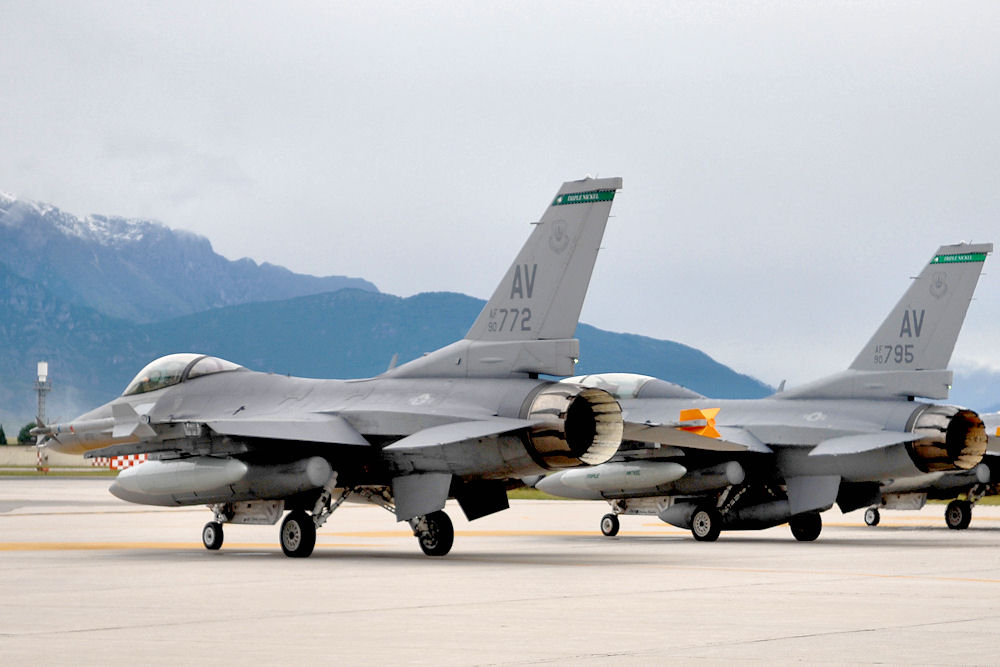
F-16C Block 40K (90-0772) and Block 40J (90-0775) of the 555th Fighter Squadron

Both use the tail code "AV" for AViano. Each F-16 has a tail markings in the squadron colors – Green with the words "Triple Nickel" in white for the 555th FS and Purple with the words "Buzzards" in white for the 510th FS.

The group's motto is "Return with honor".

The Block 40s (as well as the Block 42 F-16's) are equipped with the Martin–Marietta Low Altitude Navigation and Targeting Infra-Red for Night (LANTIRN) system. This consists of two pods, a AAQ-13 navigation pod carried on the left-hand chin pylon and an AAQ-14 targeting pod on the right-hand chin pylon. To differentiate this version the USAF has applied the designation F-16CG/DG.

Non-flying squadrons of the 31st OG are:

- 603rd Air Control Squadron "Scorpions"
- 31st Operations Support Squadron

== History ==
The group's origins begin just before World War II, when the 31st Pursuit Group (Interceptor) on 22 December 1939 and was activated on 1 February 1940. with the 39th, 40th and 41st Pursuit squadrons. The group fought in North Africa and Italy during the war, returning to Drew Field Florida in August 1945 where it was Inactivated.

A SAC Fighter-Escort group during the early years of the Cold War, the group was inactivated again in 1952. It was reactivated as the 31st Operations Group in 1991.

=== World War II ===
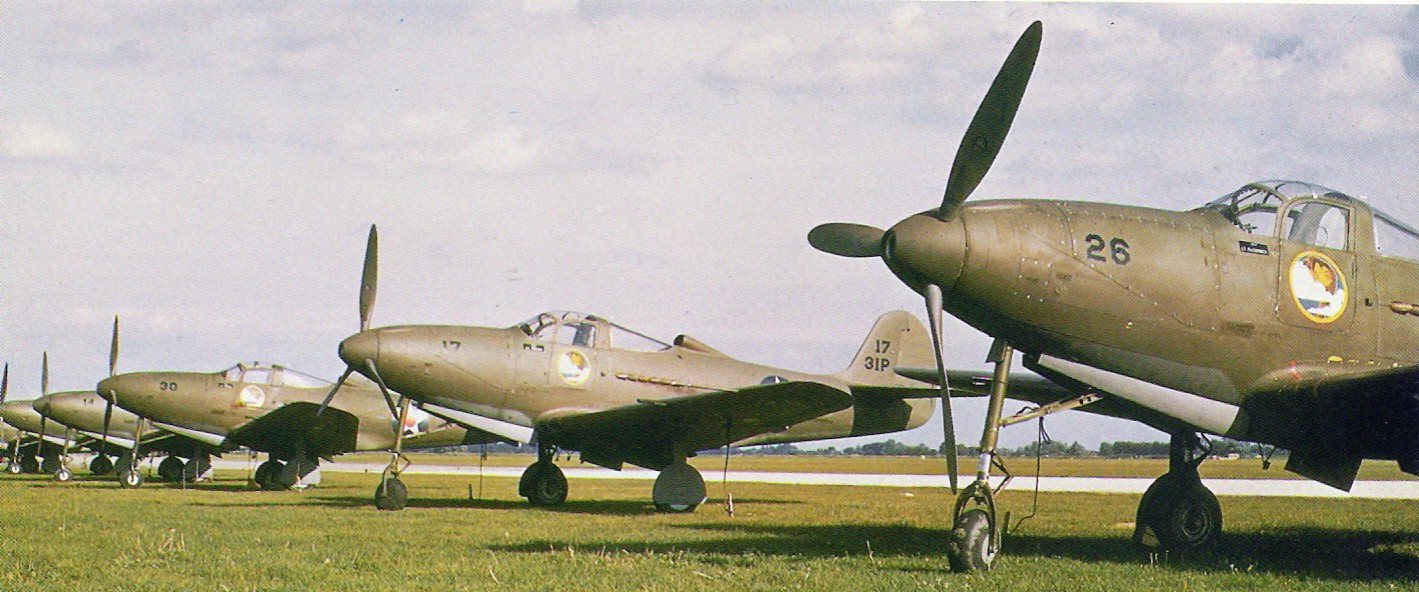
P-39Ds of the 31st PG at Selfridge Field in 1941

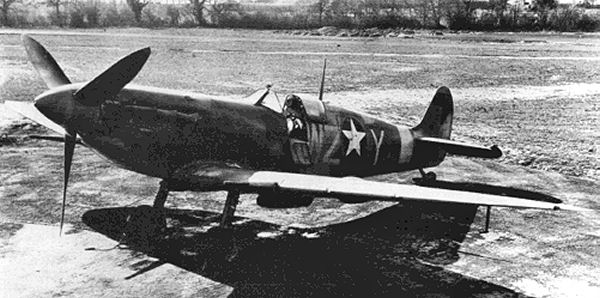
Spitfire V of the 309th Fighter Squadron

The 31st Pursuit Group (Interceptor) was constituted on 22 December 1939 and activated on 1 February 1940, at Selfridge Field, Michigan, with the 39th, 40th and 41st Pursuit squadrons. Its first commander was Lt. Col. Harold H. George, previously commander of the 94th Pursuit Squadron, also at Selfridge. The group trained and participated in Army maneuvers. The unit was redesignated the 31st Fighter Group on 15 May 1942 and was deployed to the European Theater. Most of the group moved to RAF Atcham England where it was assigned to Eighth Air Force. The stationing of the group personnel and aircraft was very haphazard, being assigned to various RAF stations in Kent and the East Midlands throughout its tenure in England.

The group consisted of the following squadrons and fuselage codes:

- 39th Pursuit Squadron (1940–1942)
- 40th Pursuit Squadron (1940–1942)
- 41st Pursuit Squadron (1940–1942)
- 307th Fighter Squadron (MX) (1942–1945)
- 308th Fighter Squadron (HL) (1942–1945)
- 309th Fighter Squadron (WZ) (1942–1945)

The group arrived in the UK without its assigned aircraft as the Bell P-39 Airacobras they trained with in the United States were found unsuitable for long-distance formation ferry flights. The ground echelon sailed on the RMS Queen Elizabeth on 4 June 1942 arriving Clyde 10 June 1942. Pilots followed later that month. In England, the group was provided with British Supermarine Spitfire Vbs by the Royal Air Force.

The 31st Fighter Group was the first group to commence operations with VIII Fighter Command.

It flew its first sorties with the RAF on 26 July, and its first squadron operation on 5 August. The 31st's first combat operation was on 19 August 1942, when it supported the Allied raid at Dieppe, France.

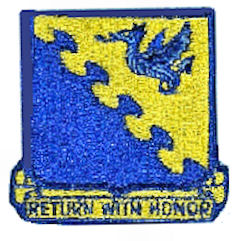
Patch with 31st Fighter Group emblem as first approved on 28 June 1941

In August 1942, the 31st moved to RAF Westhampnett in Sussex until October before moving into Tafaraoui Airfield, Algeria on 8 November 1942 as part of Twelfth Air Force to take part in Operation Torch, the invasion of North Africa.

Once in North Africa, the group attacked motor transports, gun positions, and troop concentrations during the campaign for Algeria and French Morocco. It supported ground troops in Tunisia and provided cover for bomber and fighter aircraft. During May and June 1943, after being re-equipped with Mk VIII and Mk IX Spitfires, it escorted naval convoys in the Mediterranean and bombers on raids to Pantelleria. It supported landings on Sicily in July, at Salerno in September, and at Anzio in January 1944. The group provided close air support of Allied ground forces in Italy and flew patrol and escort missions.

In April 1944, after being assigned to Fifteenth Air Force, the group was equipped with P-51B, C and D Mustangs and engaged primarily in missions to escort heavy bombers to enemy targets in Italy, France, Germany, Poland, Czechoslovakia, Austria, Hungary, Bulgaria, Romania, Yugoslavia, and Greece. The 31st earned a Distinguished Unit Citation for a 21 April 1944 mission to cover a raid on production centers in Romania. It escorted reconnaissance and cargo aircraft participating in the airborne invasion of southern France. The unit strafed airdromes and communications targets. As part of a Fifteenth Air Force task force, it attacked targets in Romania while flying to Russia on 22 July 1944. After escorting Lockheed P-38 Lightning aircraft from a Russian base for a raid on an airdrome in Poland on 25 July, it attacked a German fighter-bomber force and a truck convoy, earning a second Distinguished Unit Citation. In April 1945, when Allied forces pursued their final offensive in northern Italy, the group strafed enemy rail and highway traffic.

The 31st Fighter Group returned to Drew Field Florida in August 1945, where it was inactivated on 7 November.

=== Occupation duty ===
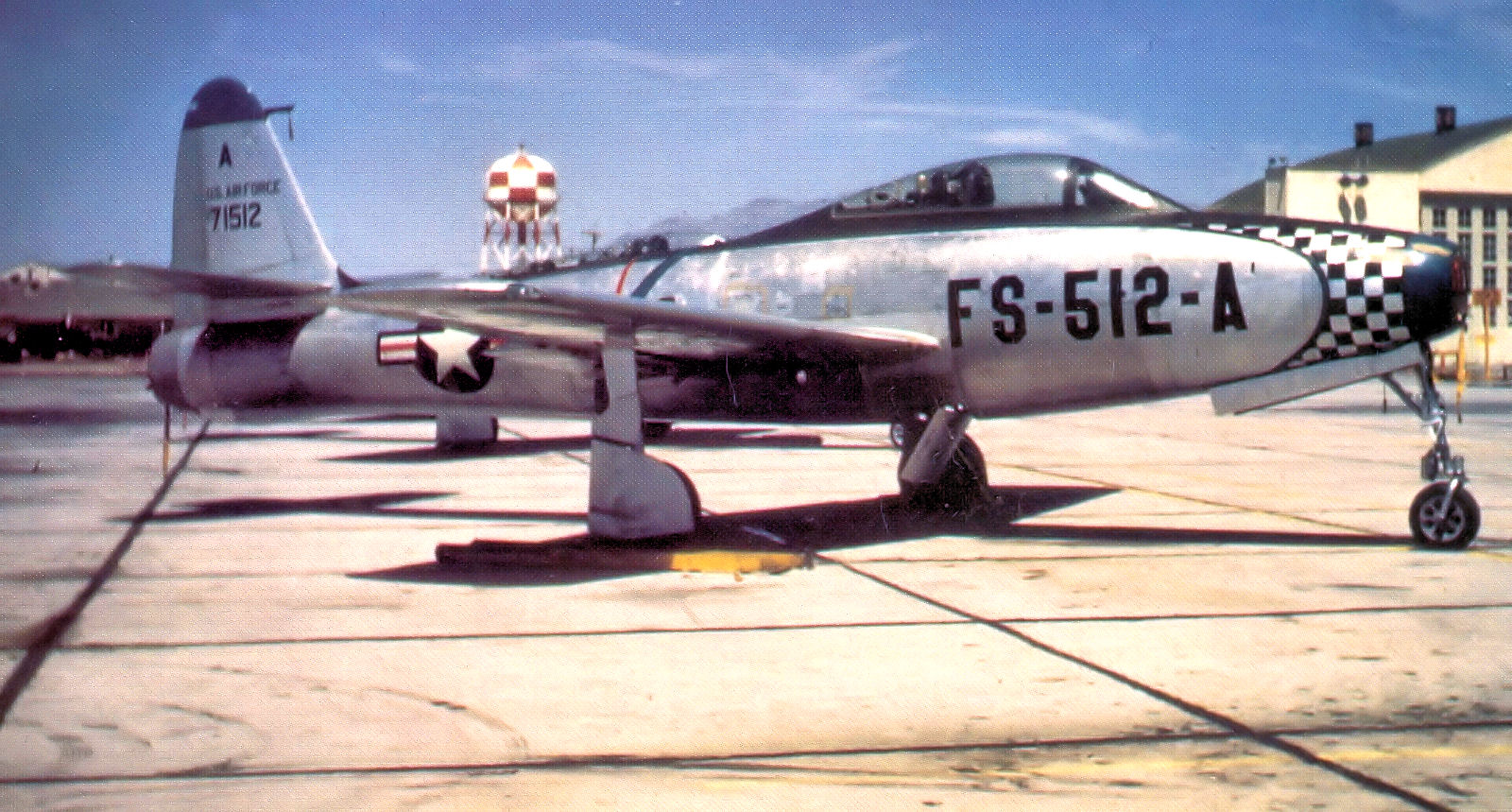
F-84C 47–1512 at Turner AFB, 1949

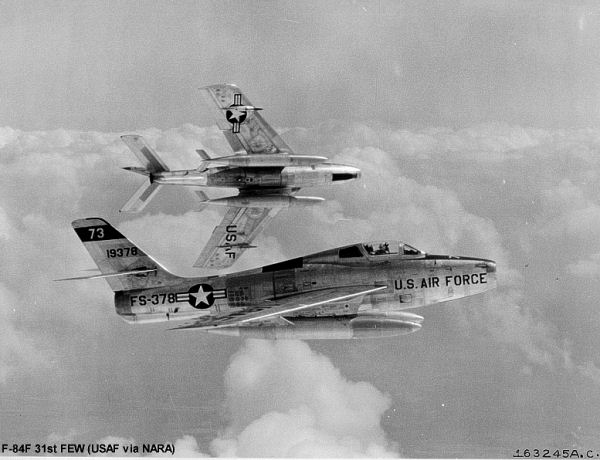
General Motors F-84F-25-GK Thunderstreaks of the 31st Fighter Escort Group, about 1952. Serial 51-9378 identifiable

The 31st Fighter Group was reactivated at AAF Station Giebelstadt, Germany on 20 August 1946 where it was assigned to the United States Air Forces in Europe XII Tactical Air Command for duty with the occupation force, assuming the mission, aircraft and personnel of the 55th Fighter Group, which was simultaneously inactivated. The group flew the former 55th's North American P-51D Mustangs from the airfield, as well as early-model Lockheed P-80B Shooting Star jet aircraft which had been deployed to the 55th. The unit moved to AAF Station Kitzingen on 30 September where it continued to operate both P-51Ds and P-80Bs.

=== Strategic Air Command ===
After a year, the group's personnel and equipment were stood down, and the group was transferred without personnel or equipment, to Turner Field, Georgia on 20 November 1947. At Turner the 31st Fighter Group became the operational component of the newly established United States Air Force 31st Fighter Wing on 20 November under Tactical Air Command, and was equipped with surplus P-51D Mustangs. The group consisted of the 307th, 308th and 309th Fighter Squadrons.

At Turner, the 31st FG trained to achieve tactical proficiency from 1947 to 1950. In the summer of 1948, the 31st Fighter Group became the second Tactical Air Command unit to receive the Republic P-84C Thunderjet. The designation was changed to F-84C on 11 June 1948.

Effective 20 June 1950, Turner was transferred to Strategic Air Command and effective 1 July 1950 control of the 31st Fighter Group was turned over to SAC and the group was redesignated as the 31st Fighter Escort Group. Upon the transfer to SAC, the group was assigned to SAC's Second Air Force on 16 July with a mission to escort SAC's intercontinental Boeing B-29 and Boeing B-50 Superfortress bomber fleet.

Along with the reassignment to SAC, the 31st was upgraded to the new F-84E model, which was designed for bomber escort duties. As the F-84E model was still a brand-new aircraft, the 31st FEW was charged with performing accelerated service test on them. For these evaluations, the group utilized the air-to-ground gunnery range at Fort Stewart, Georgia and an air-to-air range over the Atlantic Ocean between Savannah, Georgia and Brunswick, Georgia. In addition, bomber escort missions were flown with B-29s from the 2d Bombardment Group at Hunter Air Force Base near Savannah.

Beginning in December 1950 through July 1951, all tactical and most support components deployed to RAF Manston, England. The remaining components of the 31st at Turner were backfilled by the Federalized New Jersey Air National Guard 108th Fighter-Bomber Wing with 141st, 149th and 153d Fighter-Bomber Squadrons.

Between 1 June 1951 and 15 June 1942, the 31st Fighter-Escort Group was reduced to a "paper" status when the operational squadrons were assigned directly to the 31st FEW. In June 1952 the group was inactivated when the Wing completed implementation of the dual deputate organization.

=== Reactivation ===
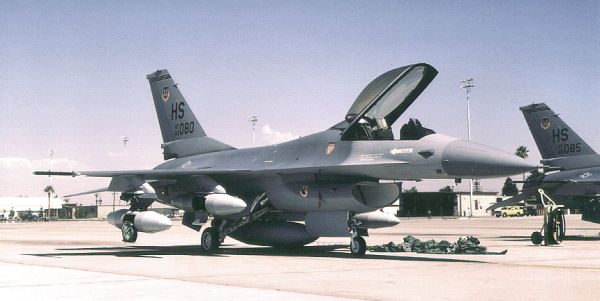
General Dynamics F-16A Block 15Q Fighting Falcon 83-1080 of the 308th FS

On 1 November 1991, the unit, which had been redesignated the 31st Operations Group, was activated as a result of the 31st Fighter Wing implementing the USAF Objective Wing organization. The 31st Group was assigned the flying components of the wing with a mission to train combat-ready fighter crews for deployment in any part of the world.

On 24 August 1992, much of Homestead Air Force Base's physical plant was destroyed or severely damaged by Hurricane Andrew. Just prior to the storm's landfall in Southeast Florida, the 31st dispersed its fighter squadrons to safe areas away from the storm's path. These locations were:

- 307th and 308th Fighter Squadrons to the 347th Operations Group, Moody Air Force Base, Georgia
- 309th Fighter Squadron to the 363d Operations Group, Shaw Air Force Base, South Carolina

The effects of Hurricane Andrew caused the almost total destruction of Homestead Air Force Base. Although both President George H. W. Bush and President Clinton promised to rebuild Homestead, the BRAC designated the installation for realignment to the Air Force Reserve, with the 31st Operations Group's squadrons being permanently reassigned to their dispersal bases, Moody AFB and Shaw AFB on 1 October 1992. The remaining wing elements worked to clean up and salvage government property at Homestead.

The 31st Group was reassigned to Italy in April 1994 without personnel and equipment, replacing the 401st Operations Group, to control flying operations for the 31st Fighter Wing.

From May 1994 – December 2004, the group participated in the major Balkan operations. Its squadrons also deployed personnel and equipment to support operations in Southwest Asia April 1991 – November 1995. In 2000 the group gained a Combat Search and Rescue Mission (CSAR), along with additional F-16s. The 31st also supported Operation Northern Watch, March–May 2002 and Operation Southern Watch, August–December 2002. Most recently the 31 OG has deployed personnel and equipment in support of Operation Enduring Freedom and Operation Iraqi Freedom.

== Lineage ==
- Established as the 31st Pursuit Group (Interceptor) on 22 December 1939

Activated on 1 February 1940
Redesignated 31st Fighter Group on 15 May 1942
Inactivated on 7 November 1945

- Activated on 20 August 1946

Redesignated: 31st Fighter-Bomber Group on 20 January 1950
Redesignated: 31st Fighter-Escort Group on 16 July 1950
Inactivated on 16 June 1952

- Redesignated: 31st Tactical Training Group on 31 July 1985 (remained inactive)
- Redesignated: 31st Operations Group on 28 October 1991

Activated on 1 November 1991
Inactivated on 1 April 1994

- Activated on 1 April 1994

=== Assignments ===
- 2d Wing, 1 February 1940
- 6th Pursuit Wing, 18 December 1940
- I Interceptor Command, 1 October 1941
- III Interceptor Command (later III Fighter Command), 18 April 1942
- VIII Fighter Command, 10 June 1942
- 6th Fighter Wing, 16 August 1942
- Twelfth Air Force, 14 September 1942
- XII Fighter Command, 27 September 1942
- XII Air Support Command, November 1942
- 64th Fighter Wing, 24 July 1943
- 306th Bombardment Wing (later 306th Fighter Wing), 1 April 1944
- 305th Bombardment Wing, c. 13 June 1945
- Third Air Force, August-7 November 1945
- XII Tactical Air Command, 20 August 1946
- Ninth Air Force, 25 June 1947
- 31st Fighter Wing (later 31st Fighter-Bomber Wing, 31st Fighter-Escort Wing), 20 November 1947 – 16 June 1952
- 31st Fighter Wing, 1 November 1991 – 1 April 1994
- 31st Fighter Wing, 1 April 1994 – present

=== Components ===
- 31st Operations Support Squadron: 1 April 1994 – present
- 39th Pursuit Squadron: 1 February 1940 – 15 January 1942
- 40th Pursuit Squadron: 1 February 1940 – 15 January 1942
- 41st Pursuit Squadron: 1 February 1940 – 15 January 1942
- 56th Rescue Squadron: May 2018 – present
- 57th Rescue Squadron: May 2018 – present
- 307th Pursuit Squadron (later 307th Fighter Squadron 307th Fighter-Bomber Squadron, 307th Fighter-Escort Squadron, 307th Fighter Squadron): 30 January 1942 – 7 November 1945; 20 August 1946 – 16 June 1952 (detached 27 July 1951 – 16 June 1952); 1 November 1991 – 20 November 1992 (detached c. 11 September – 20 November 1992)
- 308th Pursuit Squadron (later 308th Fighter Squadron 308th Fighter-Bomber Squadron, 308th Fighter-Escort Squadron, 308th Fighter Squadron): 30 January 1942 – 7 November 1945; 20 August 1946 – 16 June 1952 (detached 27 July 1951 – 16 June 1952); 1 November 1991 – 20 November 1992 (detached c. 11 September – 20 November 1992)
- 309th Pursuit Squadron (later 309th Fighter Squadron 309th Fighter-Bomber Squadron, 309th Fighter-Escort Squadron, 309th Fighter Squadron): 30 January 1942 – 7 November 1945; 20 August 1946 – 16 June 1952 (detached 27 July 1951 – 16 June 1952); 1 November 1991 – 20 November 1992 (detached 28 August – 20 November 1992)
- 510th Fighter Squadron: 1 April 1994 – present
- 555th Fighter Squadron: 1 April 1994 – present
- 606th Air Control Squadron: 1 November 2016 – present
- 731st Expeditionary Attack Squadron: 2021 - present

=== Stations ===
- Selfridge Field, Michigan, 1 February 1940
- Baer Field, Indiana, 6 December 1941
- New Orleans Army Air Base, Louisiana, 6 February – 19 May 1942
- RAF Atcham (AAF-342), England, 11 June 1942
- RAF Westhampnett (AAF-352), England, 1 August – 21 October 1942
- Tafaraoui Airfield, Algeria, 8 November 1942
- Oran Es Sénia Airport, Algeria, c. 13 November 1942
- Thelepte Airfield, Tunisia, c. 7 February 1943
- Tebessa Airfield, Algeria, 17 February 1943
- Youks-les-Bains Airfield, Algeria, 21 February 1943
- Kalaa Djerda Airfield, Tunisia, c. 25 February 1943
- Thelepte Airfield, Tunisia, 11 March 1943
- Djilma Airfield, Tunisia, 7 April 1943
- Le Sers Airfield, Tunisia, 12 April 1943
- Korba Airfield, Tunisia, 15 May 1943
- Guyotville, Algeria, June 1943

Air echelon operated from Gozo Island (near Malta), c. 28 June – 13 July 1943

- Ponte Olivo Airfield, Sicily, c. 13 July 1943
- Agrigento Airfield, Sicily, 21 July 1943
- Termini Airfield, Sicily, 2 August 1943
- Milazzo Airfield, Sicily, 2 September 1943
- Montecorvino Airfield, Italy, 21 September 1943
- Pomigliano Airfield, Italy, 14 October 1943
- Castel Volturno Airfield, Italy, 19 January 1944
- San Severo Airfield, Italy, 2 April 1944
- Mondolfo Airfield, Italy, 3 March 1945
- Triolo Airfield, Italy, 15 July–August 1945
- Drew Field, Florida, c. 25 August – 7 November 1945
- AAF Station Giebelstadt, Germany, 20 August 1946
- AAF Station Kitzingen, Germany, 30 September 1946 – 25 June 1947
- Langley Field, Virginia, 25 June 1947
- Turner Field(later Turner Air Force Base), Georgia, 4 September 1947 – 16 June 1952
- Homestead Air Force Base, Florida, 1 November 1991 – 1 April 1994
- Aviano Air Base, Italy, 1 April 1994 – present

=== Aircraft ===
- Bell P-39 Airacobra, 1942
- Curtiss P-40 Warhawk, 1942
- Supermarine Spitfire, 1942–1943
- North American P-51 (later F-51) Mustang, 1943–1945, 1947–1949
- Lockheed P-80, 1946–1947; P-51
- Republic F-84 Thunderjet, 1948–1952
- General Dynamics F-16 Fighting Falcon, 1991–1992, 1994–present

== Awards and decorations ==
- Distinguished Unit Citation
  Air Force Outstanding Unit Award
