= Djilma Airfield =

Abandoned World War II military airfield in Tunisia

Djilma Airfield
- Part of Twelfth Air Force

Site information
- Type: Military airfield
- Controlled by: United States Army Air Forces

Location
- Coordinates: 35°17′19.29″N 009°25′31.99″E

Site history
- Built: 1942
- In use: 1942–1944

Location of Djilma Airfield, Tunisia

Djilma Airfield is an abandoned World War II military airfield in Tunisia, located about 2 km (1.2 mi) north of Jilma (Sidi Bu Zayd), approximately 180 km (110 mi) west-southwest of Tunis.

The airfield was built in 1942 as a temporary field which was used by the United States Army Air Force Twelfth Air Force 31st Fighter Group during the North African Campaign against the German Afrika Korps.

The 31st Fighter Group based three squadrons (307th, 308th, 309th) of Supermarine Spitfires at the airfield from 7 to 12 April 1943. It then moved to Korba Airfield and afterwards, engineers came to the field and dismantled the facility.

Today there are little to no remains of the airfield, except the remains of a runway in the desert just north of the town of Jilma, visible from satellite imagery.
