= Agrigento Airfield =

Abandoned Sicilian airfield

Agrigento Airfield
- Part of Twelfth Air Force

Site information
- Type: Military Airfield
- Controlled by: United States Army Air Forces

Location
- Coordinates: 37°18′50.48″N 013°34′01.66″E

Site history
- Built: 1943
- In use: 1943-1944

Location of Agrigento Airfield, Sicily

Agrigento Airfield was a military airfield in Sicily, just to the northwest of Agrigento; approximately 5 km northeast of Porto Empedocle.

A pre-war Regia Aeronautica Italian Air Force base, the airfield was a primary objective of the Operation Husky landings. After being secured, it was used by the United States Army Air Forces Twelfth Air Force 31st Fighter Group, equipped with three squadrons (307th, 308th 309th) of Supermarine Spitfires. Later, it was a command and control base for the 52d Troop Carrier Wing from 1 September 1943 – 13 February 1944.

The airfield is also notable because many Italian Air Force airplanes landed at Agrigento in the days immediately following the armistice between Italy and the Allied armed forces in early September 1943. The Regia Aeronautica 8° Gruppo Macchi C.200 fighters landed at Agrigento on 13 September. Most were worn out and obsolete, no longer useful for combat, however Italian crews scrounged any parts that they could to keep their aircraft flying against the Germans. Later, the Italian Co-Belligerent Air Force (ICBAF or ACI) was formed and incorporated these aircraft.

After the American use of the base ended, it was turned over to the Italian Air Force for its use. Today, the site of the airfield is abandoned, although several runways and what appears to be a former sports facility (also abandoned) is visible at the former airfield site.
