= Cheikh Larbi Tébessa Airport =

Cheikh Larbi Tébessi Airport مطار الشيخ العربي التبسي
- IATA: TEE; ICAO: DABS

Summary
- Airport type: Public
- Operator: Government
- Location: Tébessa, Algeria
- Elevation AMSL: 811 m (2,661 ft)
- Coordinates: 35°25′55″N 8°7′20″E

Map
- Location of airport in Algeria

Runways
| Direction | Length | | Surface |
| Direction | m | ft | Surface |
|---|---|---|---|
| 11/29 | 3,000 | 9,843 | Asphalt |
| 12/30 | 2,400 | 7,874 | Asphalt |

Statistics (2020)
- Passenger volume: 12,607
- Sources: Algerian AIP, DAFIF Landings.com

Cheikh Larbi Tébessa Airport (Arabic: مطار الشيخ العربي التبسي) (IATA: TEE, ICAO: DABS) is a public airport located 1.35 nautical miles (2.5 km; 1.6 mi) north of Tébessa, the capital of the Tébessa province (wilaya) in Algeria.

== History ==
During World War II, the facility was known as Tebessa Airfield. It was a Twelfth Air Force base of operations during the North African Campaign against the German Afrika Korps. It was operationally used by the 31st Fighter Group, which flew Supermarine Spitfires from the airfield between 17 and 21 February 1943. It was also the headquarters of the XII Fighter Command between December 1942 and 12 January 1943.

== Facilities ==
The airport resides at an elevation of 811 metres (2,661 ft) above mean sea level. It has two asphalt paved runways: 11/29 measuring 3,000 by 45 metres (9,843 ft × 148 ft) and 12/30 which measures 2,400 by 30 metres (7,874 ft × 98 ft).

== Airlines and destinations ==
| Airlines | Destinations |
|---|---|
| Air Algérie | Algiers |
