= Mondolfo Airfield =

Abandoned World War II military airfield in Italy

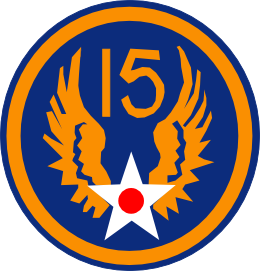
Mondolfo Airfield
- Mondolfo - Italy

Site information
- Type: Military airfield
- Controlled by: Fifteenth United States Army Air Force

Location
- Coordinates: 43°45′01.46″N 013°09′50.0″E

Site history
- Built: Winter 1944-1945
- In use: 1945

Garrison information
- Occupants: 31st and 325th USAAF Fighter Groups

Location of Mondolfo Airfield, Italy

Mondolfo Airfield is an abandoned World War II military airfield in Italy, located about 6 km southeast of Marotta and 4 km east of Mondolfo in the Marche region.

The airfield had two 4000' (2000m) parallel runways aligned approximately NW/SE, with two adjacent taxiways of about 40 hardstands each, and large areas of Pierced Steel Planking (PSP) for aircraft parking ramps (total 180-200 aircraft capacity). A blister-type hangar, a temporary steel control tower and a rudimentary tent containment area northwest of the operational airfield was also constructed. Its last known use was by the United States Army Air Force Fifteenth Air Force in 1945 during the Italian campaign

Known USAAF units stationed at Mondolfo were:

- 31st Fighter Group, 3 March-15 July 1945

307th; 308th; 309th Fighter Squadrons, P-51D/K Mustang
Primary mission was to escort B-17 and B-24 heavy bombers on missions into Northern Italy, Germany, Yugoslavia and Austria.

- 325th Fighter Group, April-July 1945

317th; 319th Fighter Squadrons, P-51D/K Mustang
Primary mission was to fly ground air support missions for advancing Allied ground forces in Italy.

Ground support units assigned were the 65th Ordnance Ammunition Company (munitions supply), and the 543d Air Service Group (ground station operations).

The airfield was turned over to the Italian government in late September 1945, and today there is little or no remains of the airfield in evidence. Remains of the northwest end of both the eastern and western runways are visible in aerial photography, along with traces of the east taxiway. The station was dismantled after the war, and the land used by the station as well as the airfield has largely been returned to agricultural use.
