= Kalaa Djerda Airfield =

Abandoned military airfield in Tunisia

Kalaa Djerda Airfield
- Part of Twelfth Air Force
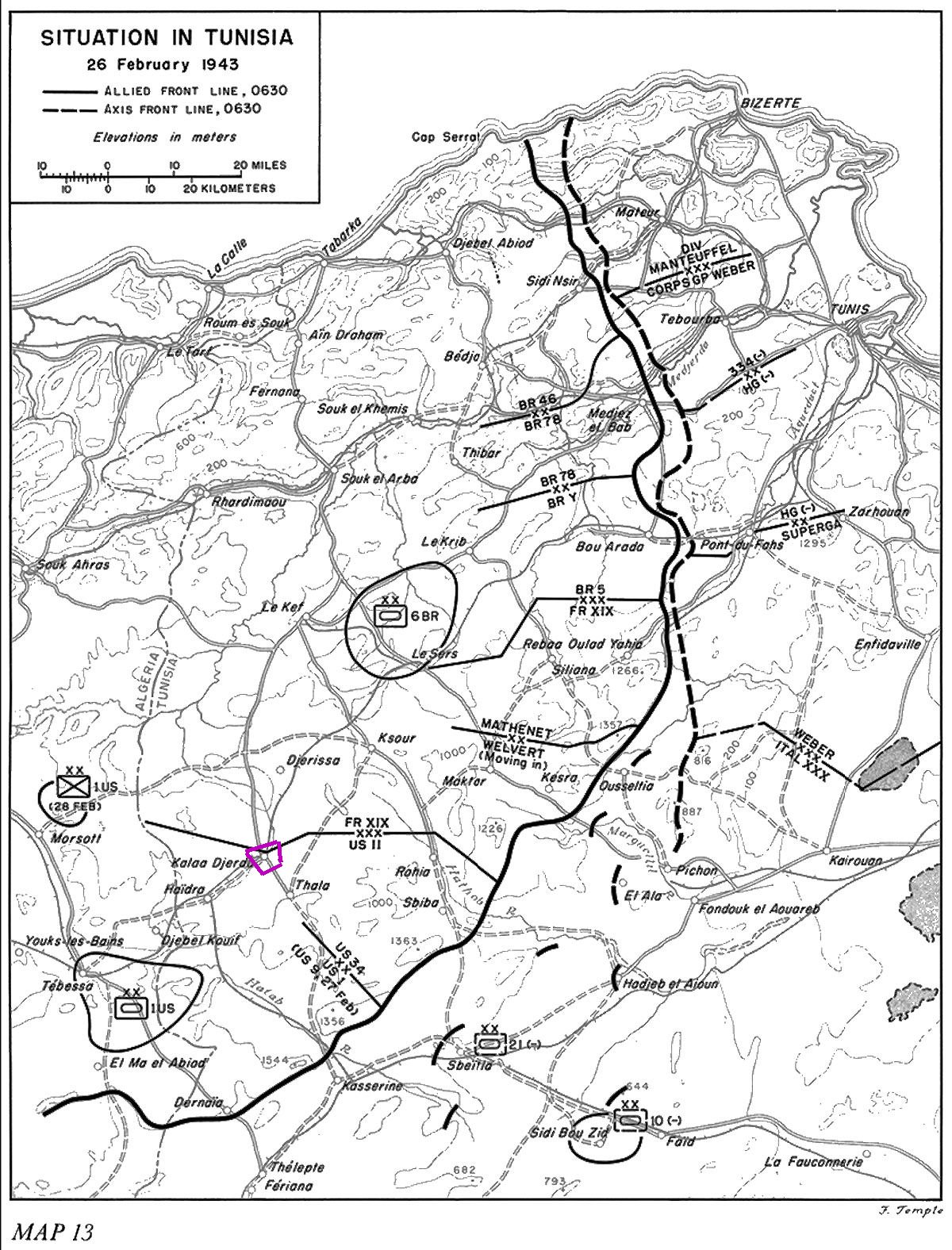
- Location of Kalaa Djerda Airfield

Site information
- Type: Military airfield
- Controlled by: United States Army Air Forces

Location
- Coordinates: 35°39′59.26″N 008°35′24.54″E

Site history
- Built: 1942
- In use: 1942-1943

Kalaa Djerda Airfield is an abandoned military airfield in Tunisia approximately 40 kilometres (25 mi) south-southwest of El Kef and 190 kilometres (120 mi) southwest of Tunis.

The airfield was built prior to World War II by the French Air Force Armée de l'Air. In 1939, GB I/19 and II/19 "Gascogne" of Snisian FA South stationed Bloch MB.210 bombers at the airfield. After the Battle of France in 1940, the Vichy French Air Force (Armée de l'Air de Vichy) continued to use the airfield until its abolition in November 1942 after the Operation Torch Landings in French North Africa and the German takeover of Tunisia afterward.

The airfield was seized in February 1943 by elements of the United States Army II Corps during the Tunisian Campaign and was turned over to the USAAF Twelfth Air Force 31st Fighter Group, which had moved east from Youks-les-Bains Airfield, Algeria, during the North African Campaign for use against the German Afrika Korps.

The 31st Fighter Group based three squadrons (307th, 308th, 309th) of Supermarine Spitfires at the airfield from 21 February to 11 March 1943. It then moved to Thelepte Airfield, and afterwards, the airfield was used in a support role for transport and re-supply and evacuation flights by C-47s. After operational forces moved into Sicily and southern Italy, the airfield was abandoned.

It appears that the village of Kalaat Khasba expanded onto the land previously used by the airfield, as two streets appear to be former runways of the base.
