= Castel Volturno Airfield =

Abandoned military airfield in Italy

Castel Volturno Airfield
- Part of Twelfth Air Force

Site information
- Type: Military Airfield
- Controlled by: United States Army Air Forces

Location
- Coordinates: 41°02′11.82″N 013°57′38.31″E

Site history
- Built: 1943
- In use: 1943-1944

Location of Castel Volturno Airfield, Italy

Castel Volturno Airfield is an abandoned military airfield in Italy, located approximately 3 km east of Castel Volturno, in the Province of Caserta in the Italian region Campania, located about 35 km northwest of Naples and about 35 km west of Caserta on the Volturno river.

It was an all-weather temporary field built by the United States Army Air Force XII Engineer Command using a graded earth compacted surface, with a prefabricated hessian (burlap) surfacing known as PHS. PHS was made of an asphalt-impregnated jute which was rolled out over the compacted surface over a square mesh track (SMT) grid of wire joined in 3-inch squares. Pierced Steel Planking was also used for parking areas, as well as for dispersal sites, when it was available. In addition, tents were used for billeting and also for support facilities; an access road was built to the existing road infrastructure; a dump for supplies, ammunition, and gasoline drums, along with a drinkable water and minimal electrical grid for communications and station lighting.

Once completed it was turned over for use by the Twelfth Air Force 31st Fighter Group from Jan through April 1944 flying Spitfires and transitioning to P-51 Mustangs. Also the 27th Fighter Group was stationed at the airfield during April and May 1944, flying A-36 Apaches, later converting to P-47 Thunderbolts.

The airfield was closed in June 1944 and largely dismantled. Today, there are few remaining traces of the airfield. The end of the former main runway is now used as a concrete foundation for agricultural buildings in farmland. Two blister hangars are being used for storage in a small area to the west of the airfield.
