= Milazzo Airfield =

Abandoned military airfield

Milazzo Airfield
- Part of Twelfth Air Force

Site information
- Type: Military airfield
- Controlled by: United States Army Air Forces

Location
- Coordinates: 38°13′00.68″N 015°14′16.64″E

Site history
- Built: 1943
- In use: 1943

Location of Milazzo Airfield, Italy

Milazzo Airfield is an abandoned World War II military airfield on Sicily, located in the southern suburbs of Milazzo, on the northern tip of the island.

Built as a temporary wartime field by Army Engineers, using Pierced Steel Planking for runways and parking and dispersal areas, and support structures being quickly constructed out of wood or tents. The following units were stationed at the base taking part in the Allied invasion of Italy from the field.

- HQ, 64th Fighter Wing, 1 September-7 October 1943
- 31st Fighter Group, 2–21 September 1943, Supermarine Spitfire
- 57th Fighter Group, 12–16 September 1943, P-40 Warhawk

With the Americans pulling out and moving onto the mainland of Italy in October, engineers dismantled the airfield. Today, there are no traces, as the area around Milazzo has grown over the years, and have obliterated any trace of the airfield. It is unknown precisely where the airfield was located due to the changed landscape.
