= Korba Airfield =

Abandoned World War II military airfield in Tunisia

Korba Airfield
- Part of Twelfth Air Force

Site information
- Type: Military airfield
- Controlled by: United States Army Air Forces

Location
- Coordinates: 36°41′32.20″N 010°50′09.24″E

Site history
- Built: 1943
- In use: 1943

Location of Korba Airfield, Tunisia

Korba Airfield is an abandoned World War II military airfield in Tunisia, located about 3 km west of Hamadet Bir Messaouda in Nabul province; 13 km north of Korbra, and 60 km east-southeast of Tunis.

Built by the US Army Corps of engineers, the airfield consisted of Pierced Steel Planking runways and parking and dispersal areas, with support structures quickly constructed out of wood or tents. Its last known use was by the United States Army Air Force Twelfth Air Force in 1943 during the Tunisian Campaign. Units which used the airfield were the following:

- 27th Fighter Bomber Group, June–July 1943, A-36 Apache
- 31st Fighter Group, 15 May-30 June 1943, Spitfire
- 86th Bombardment Group, 30 June-20 July 1943, A-20 Havoc

The airfield is also notable because many Italian Air Force airplanes landed at Korba in the days immediately following the armistice between Italy and the Allied armed forces in early September 1943. The Regia Aeronautica 8 Gruppo Macchi C.200 fighters landed at Korba on 8 September. Most were worn out and obsolete, no longer useful for combat, however Italian crews scrounged any parts that they could to keep their aircraft flying against the Germans. Later, the Italian Co-Belligerent Air Force (ICBAF or ACI) was formed and incorporated these aircraft.

With the withdrawal of the Italian aircraft in late 1943, the airfield was dismantled. Today there are few or no remains of the airfield, as the area today consists primarily of agricultural fields, although scarring on the land, where the runways and other areas were, still can be seen in aerial photography.
