= List of United States Air Force support squadrons =

List of United States Air Force support squadrons identifies the United States Air Force squadron, shield, location and support unit. A support squadron supplies all the necessary manpower and equipment needed to continue numerous tasks. An operations support squadron may dictate policy, train aircrews, and maintain airfields based on the missions of the units it supports. This type of unit will also staff the control tower and supply weather forecasts for bases and aircrews.

== Logistics Support Squadrons ==
Squadron	Shield	Location	Supported Unit
7th Logistics Support Squadron		Robins AFB	3079th Aviation Depot Wing
19th Logistics Support Squadron		Kelly AFB	3079th Aviation Depot Wing
28th Logistics Support Squadron		Hill AFB	3079th Aviation Depot Wing

== Operations Support Squadrons (OSS) ==
The OSS ensures the wing’s flying operations run smoothly by managing: airfield management, intelligence and threat information, weather support, aircrew life-support equipment, and tactics development.

Squadron	Shield	Location	Supported Unit
1st Operations Support Squadron		Langley AFB	1st Fighter Wing
1st Special Operations Support Squadron		Hurlburt Field	1st Special Operations Wing
2d Operations Support Squadron		Barksdale AFB	2d Bomb Wing
3d Operations Support Squadron		Elmendorf AFB	3d Wing
4th Operations Support Squadron		Seymour Johnson AFB	4th Fighter Wing
5th Operations Support Squadron		Minot AFB	5th Bomb Wing
6th Operations Support Squadron		MacDill AFB	6th Air Mobility Wing
7th Operations Support Squadron		Dyess AFB	7th Bomb Wing
8th Operations Support Squadron		Kunsan AB	8th Fighter Wing
9th Operations Support Squadron		Beale AFB	9th Reconnaissance Wing
12th Operations Support Squadron		Randolph AFB	12th Flying Training Wing
14th Operations Support Squadron		Columbus AFB	14th Flying Training Wing
15th Operations Support Squadron		Hickam AFB	15th Wing
18th Operations Support Squadron		Kadena AB	18th Wing
19th Operations Support Squadron		Little Rock AFB	19th Airlift Wing
20th Operations Support Squadron		Shaw AFB	20th Fighter Wing
21st Operations Support Squadron		Peterson AFB	21st Space Wing
22d Operations Support Squadron		McConnell AFB	22d Air Refueling Wing
23d Operations Support Squadron		Moody AFB	23d Wing
24th Operations Support Squadron		Howard AFB	Inactive; 24th Wing
27th Operations Support Squadron		Cannon AFB	27th Special Operations Wing
28th Operations Support Squadron		Ellsworth AFB	28th Bomb Wing
30th Operations Support Squadron		Vandenberg AFB	30th Space Wing
31st Operations Support Squadron		Aviano AB	31st Fighter Wing
33d Operations Support Squadron		Eglin AFB	33d Fighter Wing
34th Operations Support Squadron		United States Air Force Academy	34th Training Wing
35th Operations Support Squadron		Misawa AB, Japan	35th Fighter Wing
36th Operations Support Squadron		Andersen AFB	36th Wing
37th Operations Support Squadron		Lackland AFB	37th Training Wing
39th Operations Support Squadron		Incirlik AB	39th Air Base Wing
42d Operations Support Squadron		Maxwell AFB	42d Air Base Wing
43d Operations Support Squadron		Pope Field	43d Air Mobility Operations Group
44th Operations Support Squadron		Ellsworth AFB	44th Missile Wing; inactive
45th Operations Support Squadron		Patrick Space Force Base	45th Space Wing
46th Operations Support Squadron		Eglin AFB	46th Test Wing
47th Operations Support Squadron		Laughlin AFB	47th Flying Training Wing
48th Operations Support Squadron		RAF Lakenheath	48th Fighter Wing
49th Operations Support Squadron		Holloman AFB	49th Fighter Wing
50th Operations Support Squadron		Schriever AFB	50th Space Wing
51st Operations Support Squadron		Osan Air Base	51st Fighter Wing
52d Operations Support Squadron		Spangdahlem Air Base	52nd Fighter Wing
54th Operations Support Squadron		Holloman AFB	54th Fighter Group
55th Operations Support Squadron		Offutt AFB	55th Wing
56th Operations Support Squadron		Luke AFB	56th Fighter Wing
57th Operations Support Squadron		Nellis AFB	57th Wing
58th Operations Support Squadron		Kirtland AFB	58th Special Operations Wing
60th Operations Support Squadron		Travis AFB	60th Air Mobility Wing
62d Operations Support Squadron		McChord AFB	62d Airlift Wing
65th Operations Support Squadron		Lajes Field	65th Air Base Group
67th Operations Support Squadron		Lackland AFB	67th Cyberspace Wing
70th Operations Support Squadron		Fort Meade	70th ISR Wing
71st Operations Support Squadron		Vance AFB	71st Flying Training Wing
72nd Operations Support Squadron		Tinker AFB	72d Air Base Wing
75th Operations Support Squadron		Hill AFB	75th Air Base Wing
78th Operations Support Squadron		Robins AFB	78th Air Base Wing
80th Operations Support Squadron		Sheppard AFB	80th Flying Training Wing
86th Operations Support Squadron		Ramstein Air Base	86th Airlift Wing
88th Operations Support Squadron		Wright-Patterson AFB	88th Air Base Wing
89th Operations Support Squadron		Joint Base Andrews	89th Airlift Wing
90th Operations Support Squadron		F.E. Warren AFB	90th Missile Wing
91st Operations Support Squadron		Minot AFB	91st Missile Wing
92d Operations Support Squadron		Fairchild AFB	92d Air Refueling Wing
93d Operations Support Squadron		Castle AFB	Inactive; 93d Bombardment Wing
96th Operations Support Squadron		Eglin AFB	96th Air Base Wing
97th Operations Support Squadron		Altus AFB	97th Air Mobility Wing
98th Operations Support Squadron		Nellis AFB	98th Range Wing
100th Operations Support Squadron		RAF Mildenhall	100th Air Refueling Wing
305th Operations Support Squadron		McGuire AFB	305th Air Mobility Wing
314th Operations Support Squadron		Little Rock AFB	314th Airlift Wing
317th Operations Support Squadron		Dyess AFB	317th Airlift Group
341st Operations Support Squadron		Malmstrom AFB	341st Missile Wing
351st Operations Support Squadron		Whiteman AFB	351st Missile Wing; inactive
352d Operations Support Squadron		RAF Mildenhall	352d Special Operations Group
374th Operations Support Squadron		Yokota AB	374th Airlift Wing
375th Operations Support Squadron		Scott AFB	375th Airlift Wing
403d Operations Support Squadron		Keesler AFB	403d Operations Group
460th Operations Support Squadron		Buckley Space Force Base	Inactivated under Space Delta 4 in 2020
479th Operations Support Squadron			
752d Operations Support Squadron		Tinker AFB	552d Air Control Wing
757th Operations Support Squadron		Nellis AFB	

== Range Support Squadrons ==
Squadron	Shield	Location	Supported Unit
98th Range Squadron		Nellis AFB	
98th Northern Range Support Squadron		Nellis AFB	
98th Southern Range Support Squadron		Creech AFB	
388th Range Support Squadron		Hill AFB	

== Security Support Squadrons ==
Squadron	Shield	Location	Supported Unit
316th Security Support Squadron		Joint Base Andrews	316th Security Forces Group; see 316th Wing
341st Security Support Squadron		Malmstrom AFB	Redesignated 341st Missile Security Operations Squadron

== Tactical Air Support Squadrons ==
Unlike other squadrons in this article, these squadrons did not support another USAF unit, but ensured that ground forces (Army, Marines) were supported by air power. There are no active USAF units currently designated as Tactical Air Support Squadrons (TASS). Similarly functioning units are called Air Support Operations Squadrons (ASOS). See List of United States Air Force air support operations squadrons. Most numbered Tactical Air Support Squadrons that flew O‑1s, O‑2s, OV‑10s, and similar aircraft in Vietnam and the Cold War were inactivated by the 1970s-1990s as missions and structures evolved.

Squadron	Shield	Location	Notes
11th Tactical Air Support Squadron		Eielson Air Force Base	
19th Tactical Air Support Squadron			
20th Tactical Air Support Squadron			
21st Tactical Air Support Squadron			
22nd Tactical Air Support Squadron			
23d Tactical Air Support Squadron			
24th Tactical Air Support Squadron		Nellis Air Force Base	March 2018 - 23 December 2020
25th Tactical Air Support Squadron		Eielson Air Force Base	25th Air Support Operations Squadron
169th Tactical Air Support Squadron			
196th Tactical Air Support Squadron			
601st Tactical Air Support Squadron			
701st Tactical Air Support Squadron			
702d Tactical Air Support Squadron			

== Training Support Squadrons (TRSS) ==
Primarily under AETC, they do not deliver primary technical skills training or core instruction, but provide the critical enabling support, infrastructure, logistics, technology, and specialized services that allow primary training squadrons to focus on teaching airmen.

Squadron	Shield	Location	Supported Unit
37th Training Support Squadron		Lackland Air Force Base	37th Training Group
81st Training Support Squadron		Keesler Air Force Base	81st Training Group
637th Training Support Squadron		Lackland Air Force Base	Defense Language Institute English Language Center (DLIELC)
737th Training Support Squadron		Lackland Air Force Base	737th Training Group
937th Training Support Squadron		Fort Sam Houston	937th Training Group

== See also ==
- List of United States Air Force squadrons
