= 352nd Special Operations Support Squadron =

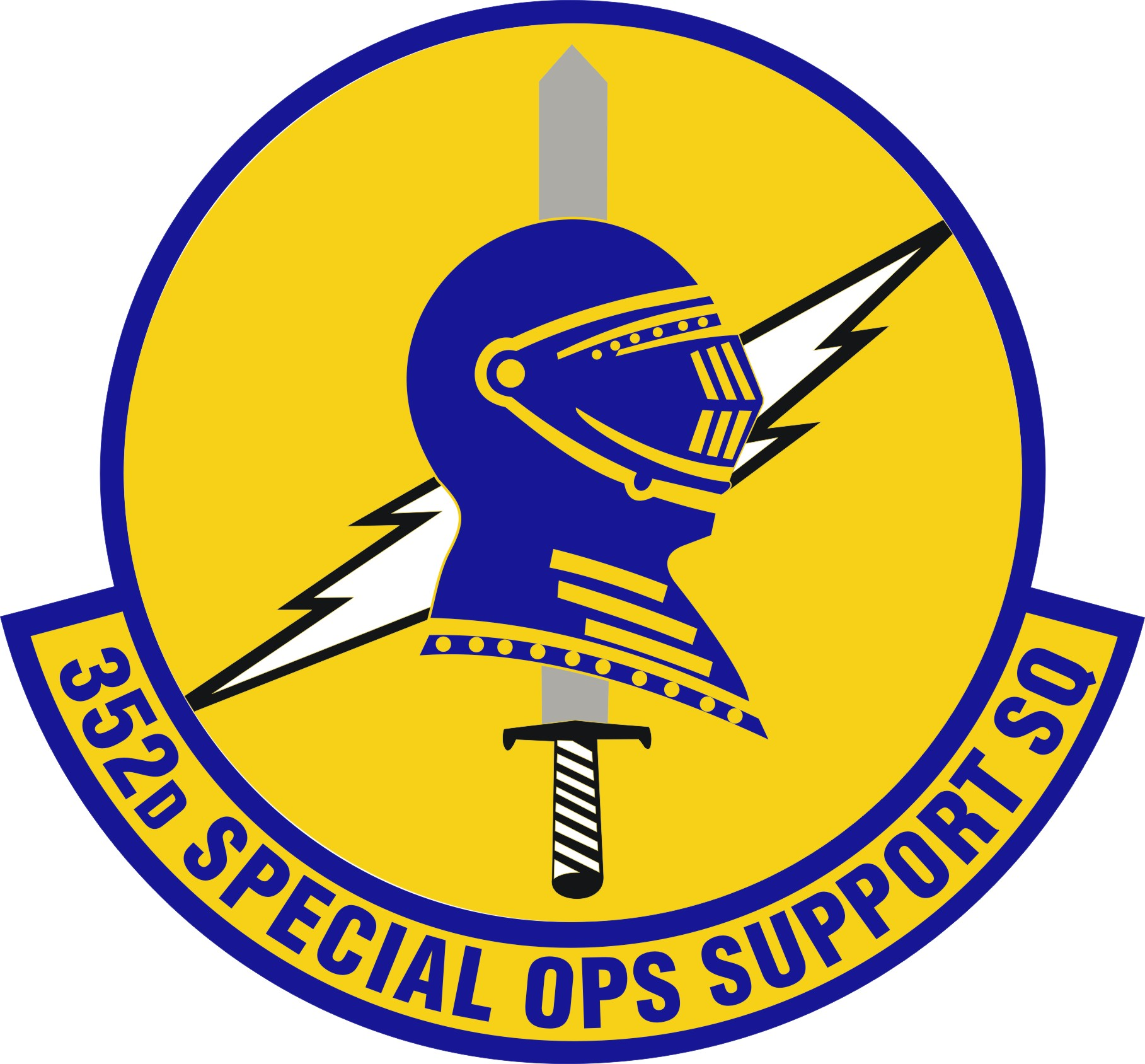
- Emblem
- Country: United States
- Branch: United States Air Force
- Type: Special Operations Support
- Part of: 752nd Special Operations Group, United States European Command
- Garrison/HQ: RAF Mildenhall, England

The 352nd Special Operations Support Squadron (352nd SOSS) is a land-based unit of the 752nd Special Operations Group (752nd SOG), 352nd Special Operations Wing (352nd SOW), the U.S. Air Force, and the U.S. European Command. It is based at the Royal Air Force base RAF Mildenhall in Suffolk, England.

== Operated Vehicles ==
The squadron operates two types of aircraft: the MC-130J Commando II and the CV-22B Osprey.

== Mission ==
The 352nd SOSS supports two flying squadrons, a special tactics squadron, and a maintenance squadron in the areas of exercise, logistics, and deployment planning.

== History ==
The 352nd SOSS has been involved in several military operations in the Middle East; including Operations Desert Storm, Enduring Freedom, and Iraqi Freedom. The squadron has also supported humanitarian and combat missions across Europe, Africa, and Southwest Asia.

It supports Special Operations forces through providing medical support, weather forecasting, and the maintenance of specialized aircraft, including the CV-22B Osprey and MC-130J Commando II. They also conduct training exercises simulating infiltration, exfiltration, search and rescue, and survival scenarios.

== Command Structure ==
The 352nd SOSS is part of the 352nd Special Operations Wing and coordinates efforts with other squadrons in the wing:

- 752nd Special Operations Group
  - 7th Special Operations Squadron, with CV-22B Osprey tilt-rotor aircraft
  - 67th Special Operations Squadron, with MC-130J Commando II aircraft
  - 321st Special Tactics Squadron
  - 352nd Special Operations Support Squadron
- 352nd Special Operations Maintenance Group
  - 352nd Special Operations Maintenance Squadron
  - 352nd Special Operations Aircraft Maintenance Squadron
  - Joint Special Operations Air Component – Europe (JSOAC-E)
