= Francis John Linnell =

Royal Air Force air marshal

Sir Francis John Linnell
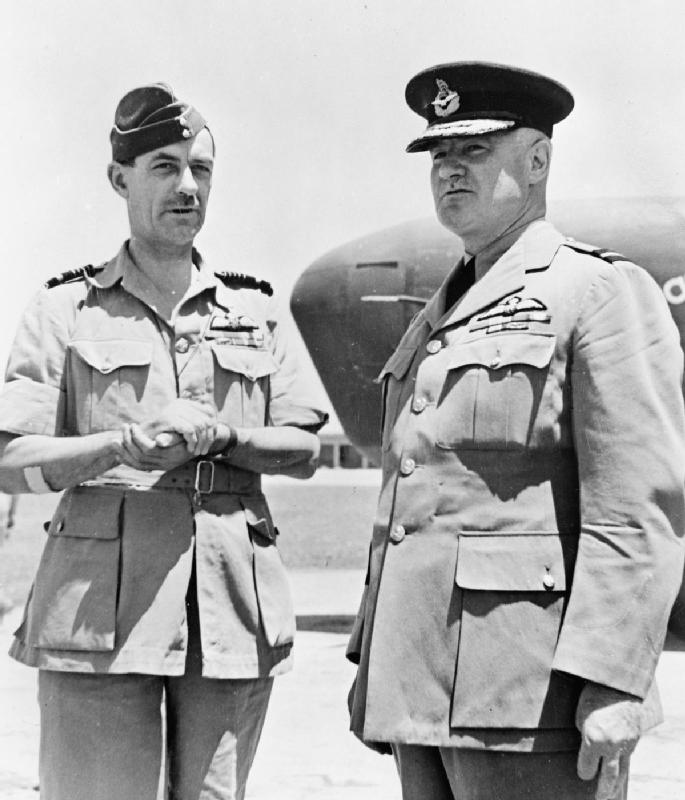
- Air Marshal Linnell (left) meets Alfred Critchley (right), the newly appointed Director-General of British Overseas Airways Corporation at an airfield in the Middle East, 1943
- Born: 16 March 1892; Margate, Kent
- Died: 3 November 1944 (aged 52); Near Tetsworth, Oxfordshire
- Burial place: Charing Crematorium, Charing
- Military career
- Allegiance: United Kingdom
- Branch: Royal Navy (1914–18); Royal Air Force (1918–44)
- Service years: 1914–44
- Rank: Air Marshal
- Nickname: "Jack"
- Commands: RAF Mildenhall (1934–35); No. 99 Squadron (1934); RAF Base Malta (1931–32)
- Conflicts: First World War; Second World War
- Awards: Knight Commander of the Order of the British Empire; Companion of the Order of the Bath; Mentioned in Despatches (3); Commander of the Legion of Merit (United States)

Air Marshal Sir Francis John Linnell, KBE, CB (16 March 1892 – 3 November 1944) was a senior Royal Air Force commander during the Second World War. He was Controller of Research and Development of the Ministry of Aircraft Production during the development of the Bouncing bomb, the weapon eventually employed in Operation Chastise. 'Jack' was dubbed Sir Francis in the desert in front of the British press by King George VI and posthumously appointed Commander of the Legion of Merit by U.S. President Franklin D. Roosevelt.

== Career ==
Francis John Linnell was born on Isle of Thanet, Margate and was educated at Bloxham School.

=== First World War ===
Linnell joined the Royal Naval Reserve as temporary warrant-telegraphist in September 1914, serving with the Royal Naval Air Service in France and Belgium. He learnt to fly at the Grahame-White Flying School Hendon. Flying a Grahame-White Biplane he gained Royal Aero Club Certificate No.1338 in June 1915. Flt Sub-Lt Linnell was responsible for carrying out trials in a special Blackburn-built B.E.2c. The unique aircraft No.3999 was ordered by Admiralty for W/T experiments, it was fitted with a 70 hp Renault engine and had a top speed of 72 mph. Blackburn-built B.E.2cs are recognisable by the ringed airscrew motif on the fin and saw active service in every theatre during the war.

From March 1916 till the end of 1919 he served with the Grand Fleet as a pilot on HMS Campania, HMS Repulse and HMS Furious and was mentioned in despatches twice. He ended the Great War with a permanent commission of captain in the newly formed Royal Air Force.

The Dunning Memorial Cup, given annually to the officer that has done the most to further aviation in connection with the fleet, was awarded Linnell in 1920 "... for flights which led to important developments in artillery and reconnaissance observation."

=== Inter war years ===
From 1920 he worked as a Royal Air Force (RAF) Communications Officer at the Department of Civil Aviation, then transferred to Signals Staff duties at the Air Ministry in 1925. He was appointed an Officer of the Order of the British Empire in June 1923, the citation reads, "This officer has done exceptionally good work in connection with Signals. His liaison with the Navy and the Army has been excellent." He received special thanks from the Air Council for preparing the handbook on air communications and intelligence systems for the air defence of Great Britain.

His first command on 20 October 1930 was No. 9 Squadron RAF located at RAF Manston and then in September 1931 Wg Cdr Linnell was Officer Commanding RAF Malta. He spent 1933 attending the course at RN Staff College Greenwich after which he took command of No. 99 Squadron RAF

He became the first Station Commander at RAF Mildenhall four days before it hosted 70,000 people for the start of the RAeC MacRobertson Air Race (England to Australia) of 1934. Then in July 1935, the year of the Silver Jubilee, RAF Mildenhall welcomed King George V for the first ever Royal review of the RAF. Linnell returned to the Air Ministry in July 1935 as Deputy Director of Organisation, Department of A.M.S.O.

=== Second World War ===
After attending Imperial Defence College from the beginning of 1939 until 25 August, he was attached to HQ RAF Bomber Command as Air Officer in Charge of Administration and Mentioned in Despatches in 1940. In February 1941 he joined the Air Ministry as Assistant Chief of the Air Staff in charge of Training. In March 1941 he was awarded the Companion of the Order of the Bath. He was appointed Controller of Research and Development Ministry of Aircraft Production and an additional Member of the Air Council on 5 June of the same year. A post that he held until 19 April 1943.

From May 1943 Air Marshal Linnell was Deputy AO C-in-C, RAF Mediterranean and Middle East He was advanced from an Officer to a Knight Commander of the Order of the British Empire (KBE) in June 1943, and knighted in the field by King George VI, at an operational airport in the Tunisian desert. Linnell rejoined the Air Ministry in July 1944 for special duties. He died on active service, 3 November 1944, in a car accident in Oxfordshire, aged fifty-two. He was cremated at Charing (Kent County) Crematorium.

Linnell was posthumously invested as a Commander of the United States Legion of Merit in recognition of his outstanding services in the Mediterranean theatre of operations from 29 February – 29 June 1944. The decoration was presented to his widow, Lady Linnell, by Brigadier General E. F. Koenig at a special ceremony in London.

==== Project Upkeep ====
Linnell was apparently against the idea of a bouncing bomb reasoning that it was drawing development resources away from the prototype high altitude bomber Vickers Windsor, his thinking may have been influenced by Charles Craven, the Chairman at Vickers.

Early in 1943, tests authorised by Linnell in June 1942 at the instigation of Sir Henry Tizard, indicated that a bouncing bomb was technically feasible. A meeting between the Air Ministry, RAF Bomber Command and MAP decided to continue development of project Upkeep with a proposal to have a fully trained squadron ready by May. AOC-in-C of RAF Bomber Command Harris thought differently and saw the project as a waste of precious Lancasters. However Chief of the Air Staff Portal was convinced by film footage of the tests and ordered three Lancasters allocated to the project. One week later, at a meeting convened by Linnell, the number of Lancasters ordered had risen to a squadron and Operation Chastise was planned for that spring.

== Personal life ==
Only son of William Henry and Kate Linnell, he had one sister, Marjorie Clare. On 26 May 1917, 'Jack' married Margaret Christabel Carpenter of St Leonards-on-Sea, Sussex, at Christ Church, Turnham Green. They had no children.

Military offices
| Preceded by Douglas Evill | AO A, HQ RAF Bomber Command; 1939–1941 | Succeeded by Ronald Graham |
| Preceded by Robert Saundby | Air Ministry as Assistant Chief of the Air Staff in charge of Training. 1941–1941 | Succeeded by Ralph Sorley |
