= 752nd Special Operations Group =

US Air Force formation

752nd Special Operations Group

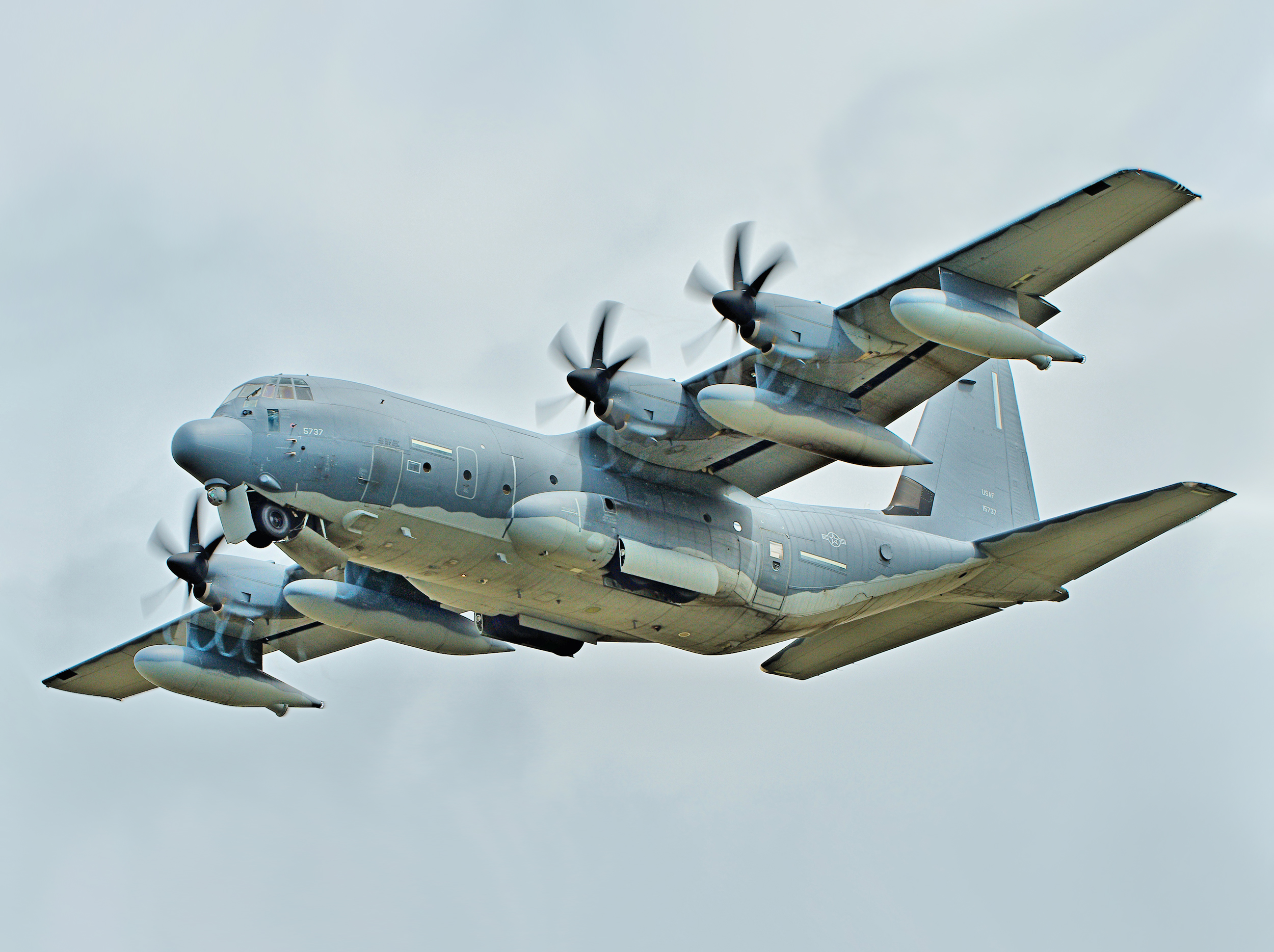
- 752nd Special Operations Group MC-130J Commando II
- Active: 2015 – present
- Country: United States
- Branch: United States Air Force
- Role: Special Operations
- Part of: Air Force Special Operations Command; 352nd Special Operations Wing
- Garrison/HQ: RAF Mildenhall, United Kingdom

Insignia
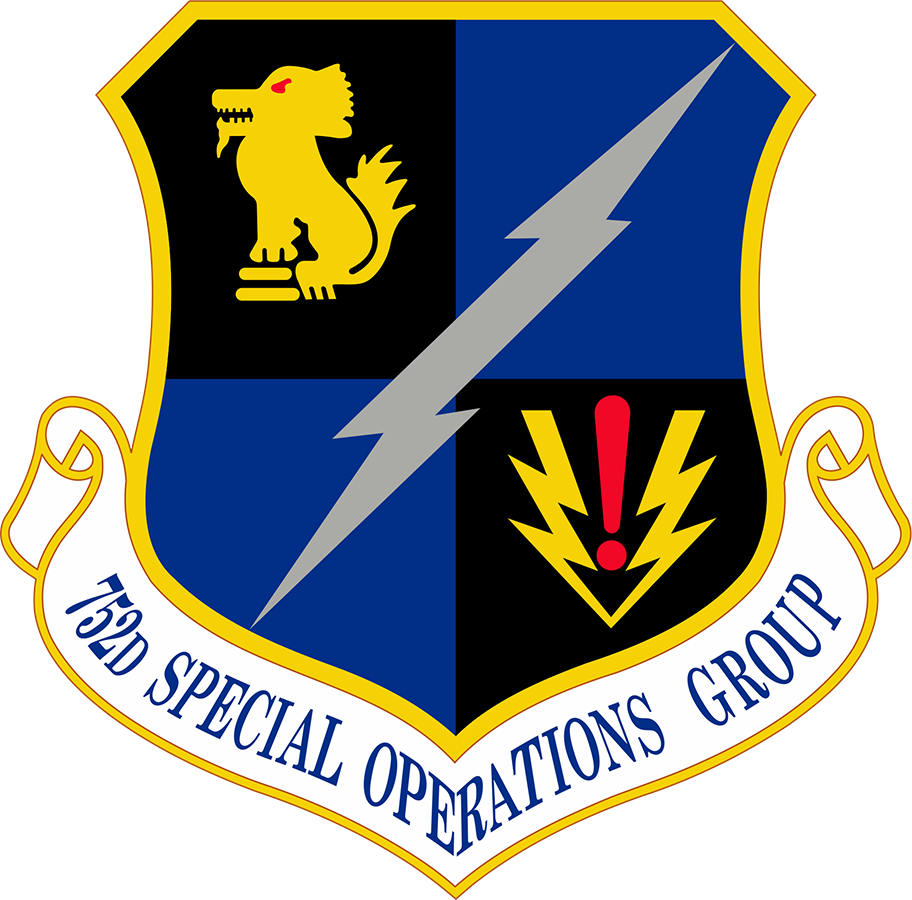
- 752nd Special Operations Group emblem

Aircraft flown
- Transport: CV-22 Osprey; MC-130J Commando II

The 752nd Special Operations Group (752 SOG) is an operational unit of the United States Air Force Special Operations Command. A subordinate unit of the 352nd Special Operations Wing, it is stationed at RAF Mildenhall, Suffolk, England, UK.

As part of the 352nd Special Operations Wing, the 752nd is the United States Air Force special operations forces contribution to the U.S. Special Operations Command, Europe (SOCEUR), a subcommand of the United States European Command.

== Mission ==
The 752nd Special Operations Group is responsible for planning and executing specialized and contingency operations using CV-22 Osprey & MC-130J Commando II aircraft, tactics and air refueling techniques to infiltrate, exfiltrate and resupply special operations forces.

== Units ==
The 752nd Special Operations Group consists of the following squadrons:

- 7th Special Operations Squadron (CV-22 Osprey)
- 67th Special Operations Squadron (MC-130J Commando II)
- 321st Special Tactics Squadron
- 352nd Special Operations Support Squadron

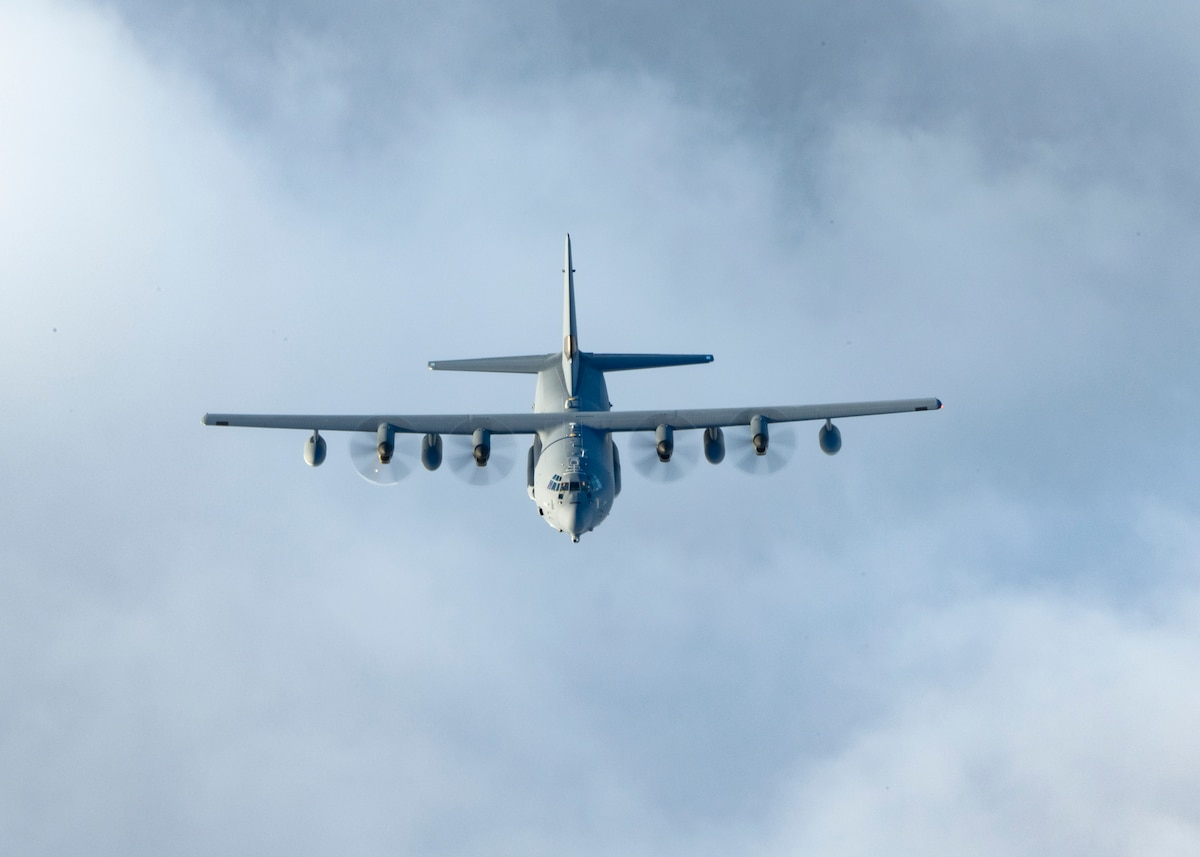
An MC-130J Commando II of the 352nd Special Operations Wing flies over Sweden on 13 November 2020.
