= 7th Special Operations Squadron =

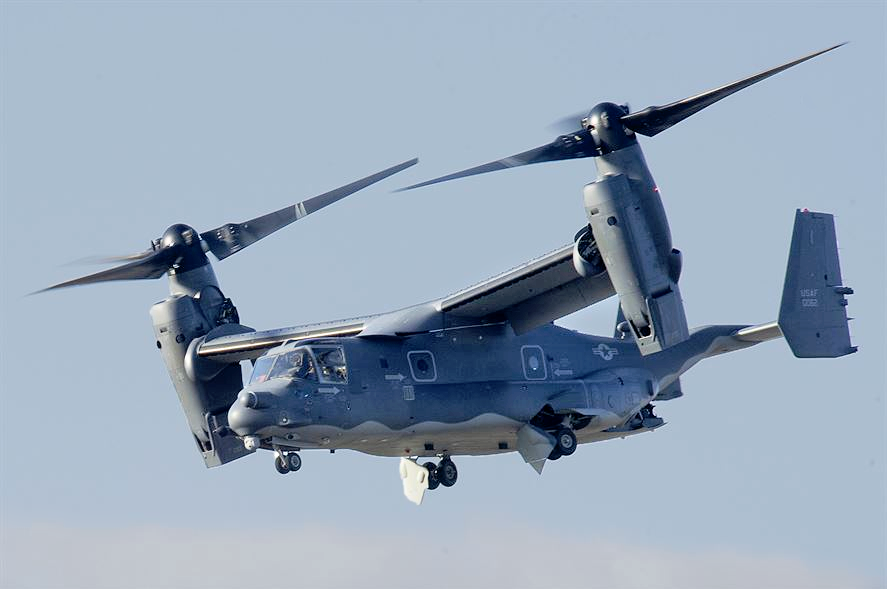
- 7th SOS CV-22 Osprey at RAF Lakenheath
- Active: 17 Jul 1942 to 30 Nov 1943; 19 Feb 1945 to 3 Oct 1946; 14 May 1964 to present
- Country: United States
- Branch: United States Air Force
- Type: Special Operations
- Role: Air infiltration and exfiltration
- Part of: Air Force Special Operations Command; 752d Special Operations Group
- Garrison/HQ: RAF Mildenhall, United Kingdom
- Decorations: Gallant Unit Citation AFOUA w/V Device Air Force Outstanding Unit Award

Insignia
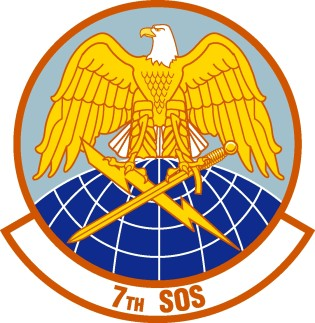
- 7th Special Operations Squadron emblem (Approved 11 January 1965)

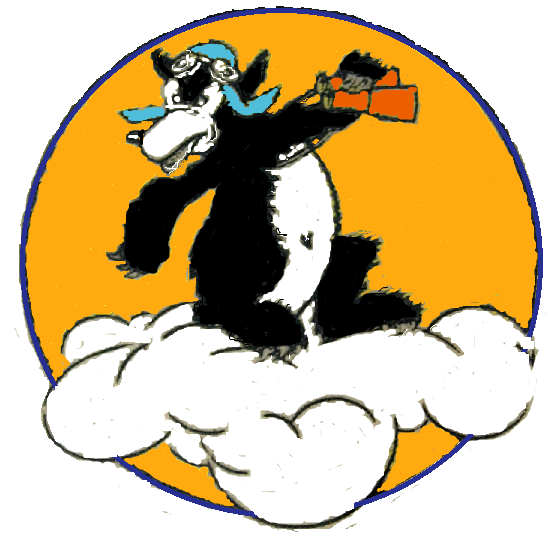
- 27th Observation Squadron emblem (approved 28 December 1942)

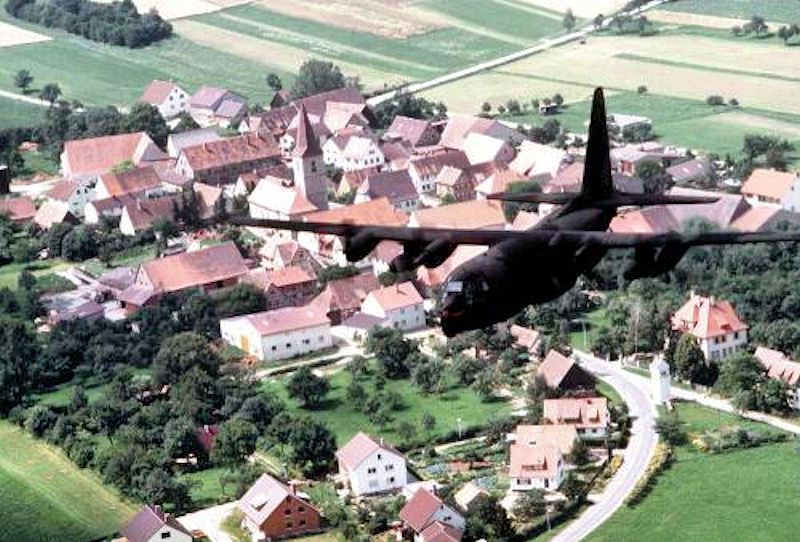
7th SOS MC-130 flying over a village in Germany

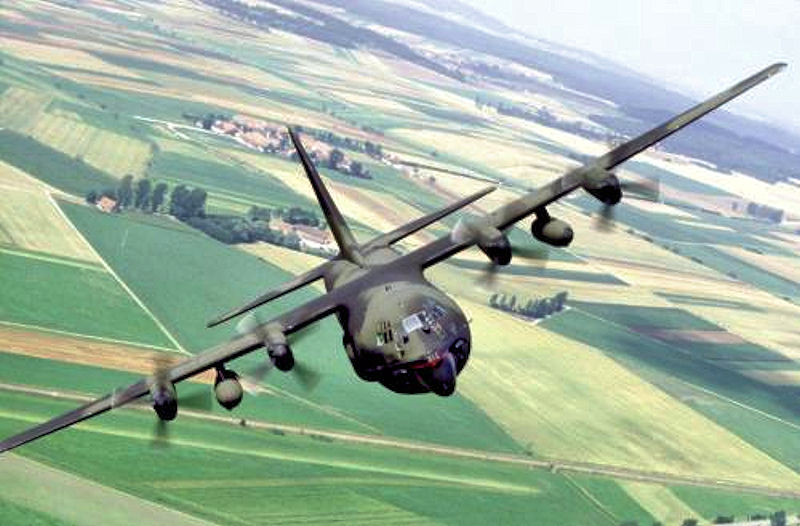
Lockheed MC-130 Combat Talon in flight

The 7th Special Operations Squadron is an active flying unit of the United States Air Force. It is a component of the 752d Special Operations Group (752 SOG), United States Special Operations Command, and is currently based at Royal Air Force Station Mildenhall in Suffolk, UK. From their base at RAF Mildenhall, the 7th Special Operations Squadron is able to deploy or extract troops from hostile, sensitive, or otherwise undesirable locations.

The squadron flies the CV-22 Osprey. Their mission is to provide long-range infiltration, exfiltration and resupply of non-conventional special operation forces. The CV-22 is fitted with advanced electronic warfare systems, terrain following and avoidance radars, and navigation systems allowing them to operate under almost any adverse weather or time condition, to maximum efficiency.

== World War II ==
As the 27th Tactical Reconnaissance Squadron, the unit was assigned to Third Air Force (Jul 1942 – Nov 1943) in the southeastern United States. It provided aerial support for training ground forces. Later, as the 167th Liaison Squadron, the unit served in the European Theater with Ninth Air Force flying courier flights with army group headquarters in areas to the rear of the front lines during 10 Mar – May 1945.

== Cold War ==
The 7th Special Operations Squadron (SOS) was activated on 1 July 1964 as the 7th Air Commando Squadron (7 ACS/USAFE) at Sembach Air Base, West Germany. The original cadre came from Hurlburt Field, Florida, in March 1964, as Detachment 4, 1st Air Commando Wing. The new squadron was equipped with 4 C-123s, 6 C-47s and 2 U-10 aircraft, and had 265 personnel authorized. In February 1967, the 7 ACS was designated as the unit to receive the new C-130E(I) Combat Arrow aircraft. In May 1967, command of the squadron was transferred from USAFE to 17th Air Force.

Major changes in the squadron began in the summer of 1968 when MC-130 aircraft replaced C-123s, U-10s, and part of the C-47 force. Also in 1968, the squadron moved to Ramstein Air Base, West Germany, and USAFE Special Order G-62, dated 2 July 1968, renamed the 7 ACS as the 7th Special Operations Squadron (7th SOS), which was also effective on 15 July. During the period from 5 to 18 July, the four C-47s, the remaining C-123s and the two U-10s were returned to CONUS. September 1968 marked the beginning of a long and successful FLINTLOCK exercise series. Joint/Combined Exercise FLINTLOCK I was conducted in the fall of 1968 and consisted of four sub-exercises located in West Germany, Greece, Spain, and Denmark.

On 3 April 1969, the squadron experienced the loss of one of its two C-47 aircraft and its crew. Major Paul C. Jones was the instructor pilot, Captain Randolph S. Crammer was the co-pilot and Staff Sergeant Donald J. Bissell was the flight engineer. The aircraft was on an instrument training flight and had departed Sembach for Ramstein when the accident occurred. The vertical stabilizer on the C-47 had collapsed, thus putting the aircraft into a condition from which the crew could not recover.

From 28 August until the end of November 1970, a 13-man 7th SOS crew, commanded by Major Irl L. Franklin, participated in the preparation and execution of the Son Tay Raid, which was an attempt to liberate POWs held in North Vietnam. Flying Combat Talon 64-0523 (assigned to the 15th SOS at Nha Trang AB, South Vietnam), the 7th SOS crew lead a dissimilar formation of H-53s and an H-3 deep into North Vietnam. Although no prisoners were found at Son Tay, the Combat Talon portion of the operation went off without a hitch. All aircraft and crews returned safely to Thailand after the mission.

Training at Ramstein was conducted around the clock and the MC-130E could be heard taxiing and conducting low-level flying as often after dark as during daylight. During the years 1969 through 1973, Ramstein hosted two fighter squadrons, 38th TRS and 526th Tactical Fighter Squadron flying the RF-4C and F-102/F-4E respectively. The night belonged to the 7th SOS, protected from prying eyes by the dark, as well as the fog and mist endemic to the area.

The spring of 1971 brought about yet another change with the additional assignment of UH-1N helicopters. In September 1972, while deployed for Operation Flintlock V, the squadron was notified by USAFE that it would leave Ramstein the following March and move to Rhein-Main AB near the city of Frankfurt, Germany. Movement Order Number 23, dated 5 December 1972, directed that the 7th SOS move to Rhein-Main and be in place there NLT 15 March 1973. At Rhein-Main, the squadron came under the 322d Tactical Airlift Wing (USAFE). From 12 to 13 March, the squadron moved its equipment and personnel, and by 15 March, it was operationally ready at its new location. The 7th SOS closed out a significant part of its history with the move to Rhein-Main. Both the C-47 and UH-1N flights remained at Ramstein AB as a squadron detachment.

By the summer of 1973, however, only the four Combat Talons (64–0523, 64–0555, 64–0561 and 64–0566) stationed at Rhein-Main remained in Europe. All other SOF assets had been either decommissioned or returned to the US. As a result of Operation Creek Action, which was completed in 1973, several extensive 'shuffles' took place. The 7th SOS was transferred from Ramstein AB to Rhein-Main AB.

The 7th SOS's MC-130Es, code-named 'Combat Talon', were no less mysterious and were also striking to look at with their matte black camouflage scheme and two large hooks on the nose. The 7th SOS's MC-130Es have been spotted in every corner of Europe. These sightings have perhaps been connected with NATO marine unit exercises with which the 7th SOS is also involved. One of the most bizarre sightings dates from January 1976 when a traveller from West Berlin saw a low-flying C-130 over the Transitstrasse, the transit route, near Magdeburg in the DDR. Flying at an estimated fifty meters over the motorway, the Hercules disappeared northwards at great speed. It was certainly an MC-130E from the 7th SOS but what it was doing in the DDR is not so certain. Granted it was flying perfectly legally in the air corridor at the time of the sighting, the fact that it was a black MC-130E from the mysterious 7th SOS does make one a trifle suspicious that it was on a clandestine mission.

In June 1975, Lt. Col. Thomas Bradley began his Special Operations career with his assignment to the 7th Special Operations Squadron, Rhein Main AB, Germany, serving as Chief Pilot, Operations Officer and in 1978 became the Squadron Commander. In 1979 the 7th SOS was named the Best Flying Squadron in USAFE. In 1977, the 7575th Operations Group was formed at Rhein-Main, realigning the 7th SOS under its control, until March 1983, when the 7th SOS transferred from USAFE to Military Airlift Command. Under this new alignment all special operations forces came into a chain of command from squadron through the 2d Air Division to 23d Air Force.

When the 2nd Air Division was inactivated, the 39th Aerospace Rescue and Recovery Wing at Eglin AFB, Florida picked up the 7th SOS for training and logistics support. Operational control of the squadron resided with the Commander, Special Operations Task Force Europe (SOTFE) at Patch Barracks, Stuttgart-Vaihingen, West Germany.

With the relocation of the 7406th to Greece, the 7th Special Operations Squadron was moved from Ramstein to Rhein-Main as one of the units shuffled as part of operation Creek Action. The 7406th's Hercules had been used for covert COMINT missions along the Eastern Bloc borders. The 7th SOS's MC-130Es, code-named Combat Talon, were no less mysterious and were also striking to look at with their matte black camouflage scheme and two large hooks on the nose.

It is these hooks that provided the clue to the covert task of these aircraft because they were the most visible element of the Fulton surface-to-air recovery system invented at the beginning of the 1960s and originally intended for fast and safe recovery of downed pilots from the ground or the sea as well as for the recovery of reconnaissance satellite capsules parachuting to earth.

The recovery system was not generally known about until around 1965 when several C-130s went into action in the Vietnam War. Being also equipped with terrain following radar and a vast amount of ECM equipment, these special EC-130Es were ideally suited for dropping infiltrators and agents behind enemy lines and picking them up again.

This, then, was the type of aircraft used in Europe by the 7th SOS as MC-130E Combat Talons. Although even today very little is known about this special unit. According to a Fact Sheet issued by the 1st SOW, the MC-130Es can be used for infiltration operations in which commando and sabotage units are dropped in enemy territory and for difficult air drops. For daytime drops the squadron employed high altitude low opening (HALO) drops. Drops after sunset were typically high altitude high opening (HAHO). Heavy equipment pallet drops were often from an extremely low altitude – drops from below fifteen meters were not exceptional.

The 7th SOS was reassigned to the 39th Aerospace Rescue & Recovery Wing, on 1 February 1987 and to the 352d Special Operations Group, on 1 December 1992 relocating in the process to RAF Alconbury, England.

== Post Cold War ==
On 22 May 1990, the Air Force Special Operations Command was established as a major command with its headquarters at Hurlburt Field, Florida, replacing 23d Air Force in the unit's chain of command. On 15 January 1991, the unit deployed in support of Operations DESERT SHIELD/STORM to Incirlik AB, Turkey. Flying operations were conducted until the end of the war. The redeployment to Rhein-Main AB was conducted in early March 1991. Before the squadron could reestablish routine training operations, they were deployed again to Turkey. Within 24 hours of the president's order, they performed the first operational PROVIDE COMFORT airdrop over northern Iraq.

In August 1991, a 7th crew deployed to Kadena AB, Okinawa, Japan to augment the 1st SOS after their abrupt move from Clark AB, Republic of the Philippines. This augmentation was continuously supported by the 7th SOS until April 1992, when they deployed in support of the State Department ordered evacuation of American citizens in Sierra Leone. Operation SILVER ANVIL brought home more than 400 people.

During the third quarter of 1991, the squadron was notified that it would move from Rhein-Main to RAF Alconbury, UK during FY92. Concurrent with the move, the squadron would convert from the MC-130E Combat Talon I to the MC-130H Combat Talon II. For the first time since its activation in the mid-1960s, the squadron would be located outside Germany. Beginning on 5 November 1992, elements of the 7th SOS began the move from Rhein-Main to RAF Alconbury.

The date marked the official move of the squadron, but remaining Combat Talon I crews and maintenance personnel continued to operate out of Germany. Detachment 7, 39 SOW was established at Rhein-Main, effective 5 November, to provide oversight for the CT I element. As the new Combat Talon IIs arrived in Europe, they were delivered to RAF Alconbury. At years end, the 7th SOS was operational with the Combat Talon II, and the older Combat Talon Is were transferred back to the US. Formal raising of the flag at Alconbury took place on 5 November 1992.

Ironically, four months later, in February 1993, the entire squadron deployed back to Rhein-Main AB, Germany in support of Operation PROVIDE PROMISE. While there, members of the unit conceived and tested a unique delivery technique for the free-fall airdrop of individual Meals Ready to Eat (MREs) over Bosnia-Herzegovina. Using leaflet drop rigging procedures, the Tri-wall Aerial Distribution System (TRIADS) was a way to safely deliver food to drop zones close to cities, which avoided fights at distribution centers and kept the besieged refugees from being lured into Serbian fields of fire. This quality idea went from the drawing board to full utilization in less than thirty days. It is still being used and is saving lives.

In October 1993, 7th SOS aircraft and personnel completed an historic mission to the former Soviet Central Asian states of Turkmenistan, Uzbekistan, Tajikistan, Kyrgyzstan, Kazakhstan, and Azerbaijan, transiting Russia and Georgia. This trip represented the first significant contact between US military forces and military representatives from these newly independent states, and gave the squadron a new appreciation for the region.

In December 1993, the squadron performed another first, a humanitarian relief mission to Rivne, Ukraine. This mission provided needed supplies to people of this area. December 1993 also found the 7th SOS back in business at Kenitra Air Base, in Morocco. Through aggressive Office of Defense Cooperation action at the US Embassy in Rabat, the cooperation of Royal Moroccan Air Force officials at the Air Staff and Kenitra Air Base, and the persistence of 7th SOS planners, the squadron was once again flying Combat Talons through the Atlas Mountains.

The same energetic quest for lucrative training locations resulted in a return to Greece and night low-level routes in Spain. In May 1994, two 7th SOS loadmasters ventured to Tunisia, to familiarize Tunisian loadmasters with procedures for air dropping the Combat Rubber Raiding Craft (CRRC). The result was enhanced Tunisian capabilities and improved cooperation with the 1st and 3d Special Forces Group. The squadron's stay at RAF Alconbury was a short one. On 12 January 1995, the squadron moved to RAF Mildenhall, United Kingdom where the 352d Special Operations Group consolidated all of its assigned forces.

Its unconventional warfare capability has reaped the squadron nine AF Outstanding Unit Awards, the 1997 MacKay Trophy for the most meritorious USAF flight of the year, the 1998 William Tunner Award for the most outstanding airlift mission, and selection as AFSOC's Special Operations Squadron of the Year for 1998, the 2004 PK Carlton Award for Valor. In 2005, one of the squadron's MC-130H aircraft (Callsign Wrath 11) crashed while on an NVG low-level training flight in southern Albania killing all aboard.

In 2013 the 7th SOS transitioned from the MC-130H to the Bell Boeing V-22 Osprey.

On 8 January 2015 the last MC-130H departed the 7 SOS returning to Hurlburt Field where they'll continue to fly and make an impact for special operations. The last MC-130H Combat Talon II departure from RAF Mildenhall marks the final step of Special Operations Command Europe's transition from the Talon II to the CV-22 Osprey.

Today, the 7th SOS continues to maintain its traditional ties with the United Kingdom, Norway, Germany, Spain, Italy and France. From Central Asia to South Africa and all of Europe, the squadron's mission is ever expanding and it is ready, willing and able to perform wherever tasked—anywhere, anytime.

== Lineage ==
27th Tactical Reconnaissance Squadron

- Constituted as the 27th Observation Squadron on 1 July 1942

Activated on 17 July 1942
Redesignated 27th Reconnaissance Squadron (Fighter) on 2 April 1943
Redesignated 27th Tactical Reconnaissance Squadron on 11 August 1943
Disbanded on 30 November 1943

- Reconstituted on 19 September 1985 and consolidated with the 167th Liaison Squadron and the 7th Special Operations Squadron as the 7th Special Operations Squadron

167th Liaison Squadron

- Activated on 19 February 1945 as the 167th Liaison Squadron by special authority prior to constitution on 1 Mar 1945

Inactivated on 3 October 1946

- Consolidated on 19 September 1985 with the 27th Tactical Reconnaissance Squadron and the 7th Special Operations Squadron as the 7th Special Operations Squadron

7th Special Operations Squadron

- Constituted as the 7th Air Commando Squadron, Composite and activated on 14 May 1964 (not organized)

Organized on 1 July 1964
Redesignated 7th Special Operations Squadron on 15 July 1968

- Consolidated on 19 September 1985 with the 167th Liaison Squadron and the 27th Tactical Reconnaissance Squadron

=== Assignments ===
- 77th Observation Group (later 77th Reconnaissance Group, 77th Tactical Reconnaissance) Group, 17 July 1942 – 30 November 1943
- Ninth Air Force, 19 February 1945 (attached to Sixth Army Group to 14 June 1945)
- XII Tactical Air Command, 20 May 1945
- US Forces, European Theater, 15 July 1945
- Third Air Force, 4 August 1945
- XIX Tactical Air Command, 21 January 1946
- Tactical Air Command, 21 March 1946
- Ninth Air Force, 28 March 1946 – 3 October 1946
- United States Air Forces in Europe, 14 May 1964 (not organized)
- Seventeenth Air Force, 1 May 1967
- 26th Tactical Reconnaissance Wing, 17 November 1972
- 86th Tactical Fighter Wing, 31 January 1973
- 322d Tactical Airlift Wing, 15 March 1973
- Seventeenth Air Force, 30 June 1975
- 601st Tactical Control Wing, 15 October 1975
- 7575th Operations Group, 1 July 1977
- 2d Air Division, 1 March 1983
- 39th Aerospace Rescue & Recovery Wing (later 39th Special Operations Wing), 1 February 1987 (attached to Joint Special Operations Task Force, 13 January 1991 – 18 March 1991 and 6 April 1991 – 14 May 1991)
- 352d Special Operations Group, 1 December 1992 – 23 Mar 2015 (attached to Joint Special Operations Task Force, 22 Feb-22 Mar 1993)
- 752d Special Operations Group, 23 Mar 2015 – present

=== Stations ===
- Godman Field, Kentucky, 17 July 1942
- Alamo Field, Texas, 15 October 1942
- Abilene Army Air Field, Texas, 9 April 1943
- Esler Field, Louisiana, 13 September 1943
- Birmingham Army Air Field, Alabama, 14 November 1943 – 30 November 1943
- Vittel, France, 19 February 1945
- Kaiserslautern, Germany, 5 April 1945
- Pfaffengrund, Germany, 14 April 1945
- Darmstadt, Germany, 10 June 1945 – 2 July 1945
- Drew Field, FL, 4 August 1945
- Muskogee Army Air Field, Oklahoma, 1 September 1945
- Marshall Army Airfield, Kansas, 1 November 1945 – 3 October 1946
- Sembach Air Base, West Germany, 1 July 1964
- Ramstein Air Base, West Germany, 15 August 1968
- Rhein-Main Air Base, West Germany, 15 March 1973

Deployed at Incirlik Air Base, Turkey, 13 January 1991 – 18 March 1991 and 6 April 1991 – 14 May 1991

- RAF Alconbury, UK, 1 October 1992

Deployed at Rhein-Main Air Base, Germany, 22 February 1993 – 22 March 1993

- RAF Mildenhall, UK, 17 February 1995 – present

=== Aircraft ===
- North American O-47, 1942
- Stinson L-1 Vigilant, and L-4, 1942, 1945
- Piper L-4 Grasshopper, 1942, 1945
- Bell P-39 Airacobra, 1942–1943
- Stinson L-5 Sentinel, 1945–1946
- Douglas C-47 Skytrain, 1964–1973
- Fairchild C-123 Provider, 1964-c. 1973
- Helio U-10 Courier, 1964–1968
- Lockheed C-130 Hercules, 1968–1980
- Bell UH-1 Huey, 1971–1973
- Lockheed MC-130H Combat Talon II, 1993–2015
- Bell Boeing CV-22 Osprey, 2013–present

== Bibliography ==
- Maurer, Maurer, ed. (1983) [1961]. Air Force Combat Units of World War II (PDF) (reprint ed.). Washington, DC: Office of Air Force History. ISBN 0-912799-02-1. LCCN 61060979.
- Maurer, Maurer, ed. (1982) [1969]. Combat Squadrons of the Air Force, World War II (PDF) (reprint ed.). Washington, DC: Office of Air Force History. ISBN 0-405-12194-6. LCCN 70605402. OCLC 72556. Archived from the original (PDF) on 20 December 2016.
