= 321st Special Tactics Squadron =

- Active: 1943–1945; 1992–present
- Country: United States of America
- Branch: United States Air Force
- Type: Special Operations Force
- Role: Special Operations
- Part of: Air Force Special Operations Command
- Garrison/HQ: RAF Mildenhall
- Motto: "Et quis dinumerare possit"
- Engagements: World War II; War in Afghanistan; Iraq War

Insignia
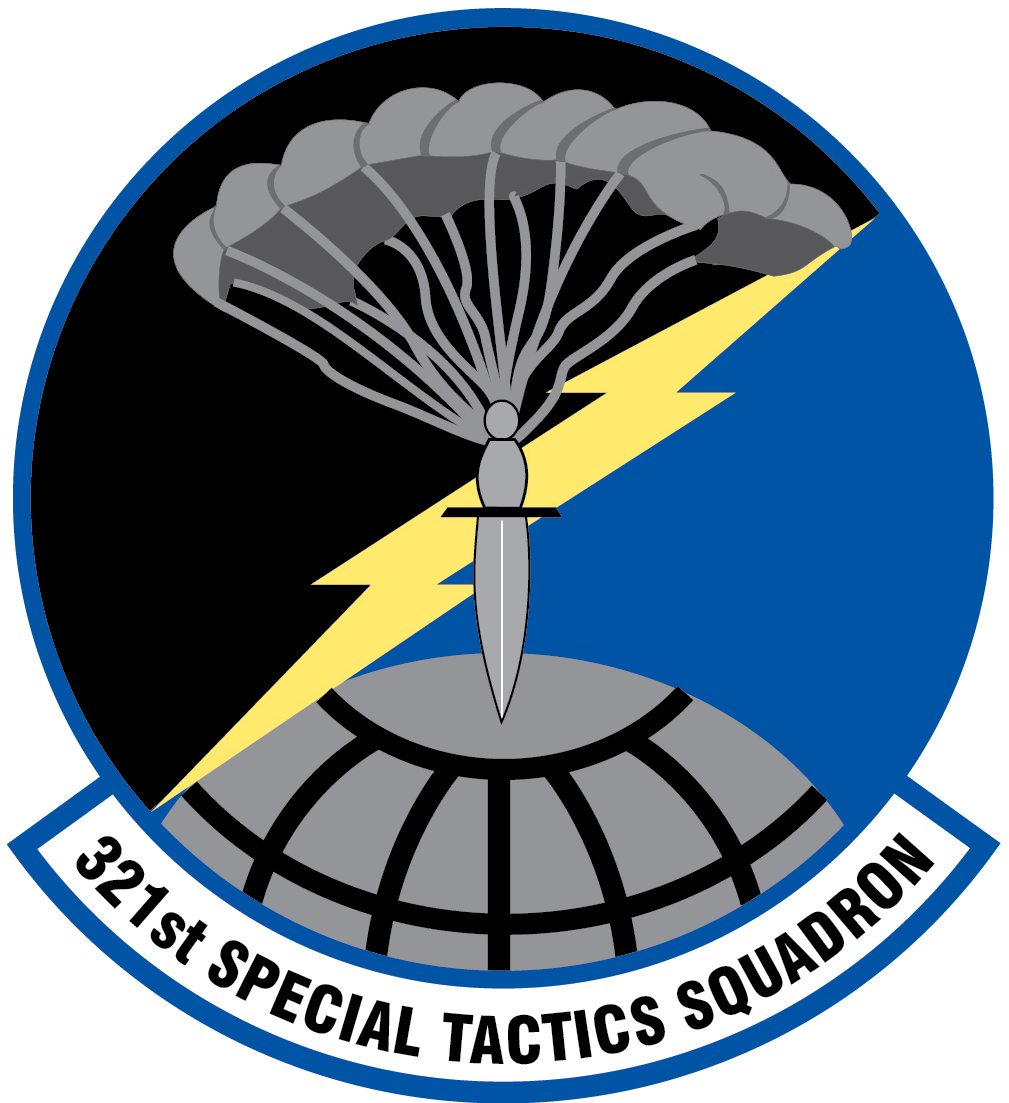
- 321st Special Tactics Squadron emblem

The 321st Special Tactics Squadron (321st STS) is an active ground unit, within the 752d Special Operations Group (752 SOG), United States Air Force, United States European Command, and is based at RAF Mildenhall, in Suffolk, eastern England.

This squadron, combined with the unit's sister airborne units in the 752d Special Operations Group, allows the group to be capable of handling situations within a 4,300 km (2,700 mi) range of RAF Mildenhall, or further with fuel stops, and make up the special operations forces element of the United States Air Forces in Europe. Their specialized training and support structure make them a very versatile unit.

== Mission ==
The 321st STS provides a quick reaction, rapid deployment force to establish and provide air-to-ground control during special operations or conventional missions. Its special reconnaissance operators, combat controllers and pararescuemen conduct the reconnaissance, surveillance, assessment, and creation of assault zone sites and provide air traffic control and long-range secure command and control missions. They also provide combat trauma medical care, personnel recovery and terminal attack control of munitions delivered by fixed- and rotary-wing aircraft.

== History ==
Constituted as 321 Fighter Control Squadron, and activated, on 15 May 1943 at Bradley Field, CT. Inactivated on 16 Nov 1945. Disbanded on 8 October 1948. Reconstituted, and redesignated as 321 Special Tactics Squadron, on 20 Feb 1992. Activated on 31 March 1992, assigned to 752nd Special Operations Group, 352nd Special Operations Wing.

== Lineage ==
- Constituted as 321st Fighter Control Squadron, and activated on 15 May 1943.

Inactivated on 16 Nov 1945.
Disbanded on 8 Oct 1948.

- Reconstituted, and redesignated as 321st Special Tactics Squadron on 20 Feb 1992.

Activated on 31 Mar 1992.

=== Assignment ===
- I Fighter Command, 15 May 1943;
- IX Fighter Command, 8 Jan 1944;
- IX Air Support Command (later, IX Tactical Air Command), 1 Feb 1944;
- IX Air Defense Command, 25 Apr 1944 (attached to IX Tactical Air Command, 12 Oct-4 Nov 1944);
- IX Tactical Air Command, 5 Nov 1944;
- XII Tactical Air Command, 25 Jul 1945;
- unknown, 25 Oct-16 Nov 1945.
- 720th Special Tactics Group, 31 Mar 1992;
- 352d Special Operations Group (later 352d Special Operations Wing), 1 Jan 1993 – present

=== Stations ===
- Bradley Field, CT, 15 May-21 Dec 1943;
- Aldermaston, England, 13 Jan 1944;
- Keevil, England, 25 Jan 1944;
- Beaulieu, England, 11 Mar 1944;
- Newcastle upon Tyne, England, 10 May 1944;
- Bournemouth, England, 30 Jun 1944;
- Le Vast, France, 16 Aug 1944;
- Eure et Loir, France, 30 Aug 1944;
- Ozoir la Ferriere, France, 5 Sep 1944;
- Hun, Belgium, c. 6 Oct 1944;
- Verviers, Belgium, 12 Nov 1944;
- Liege, Belgium, 19 Dec 1944;
- Verviers, Belgium, 21 Jan 1945;
- Brühl, Germany, 26 Mar 1945;
- Göttingen, Germany, 11 Apr 1945;
- Nohra, Germany, 25 Apr 1945;
- Fritzlar, Germany, 25 Jun 1945-unknown;
- Camp Myles Standish, MA, 15–16 Nov 1945.
- RAF Alconbury, England, 31 Mar 1992;
- RAF Mildenhall, England, 17 Feb 1995 – present

== See also ==
- List of United States Air Force special tactics squadrons
