= 352nd Special Operations Wing =

US Air Force formation

352nd Special Operations Wing

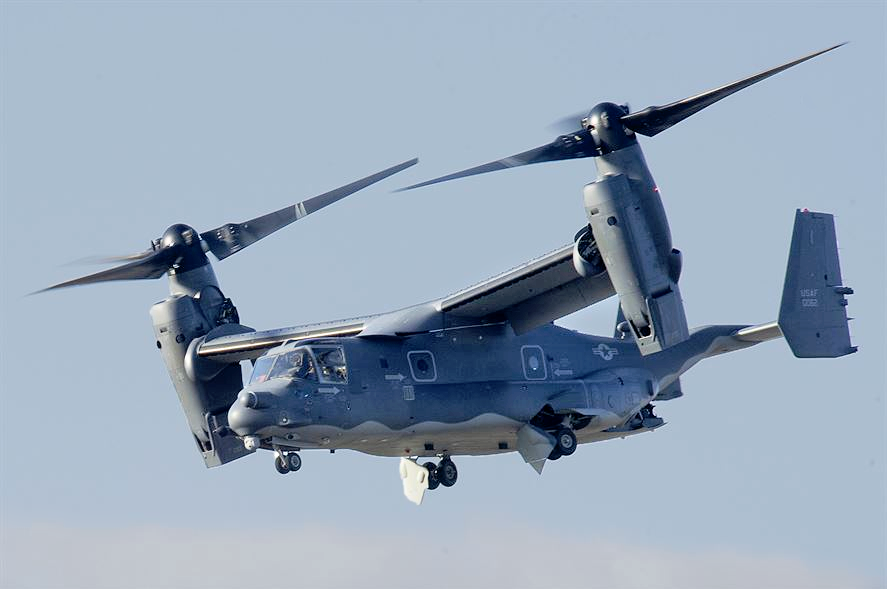
- Group CV-22 Osprey at RAF Lakenheath
- Active: 1944–1945; 1959–1961; 1970–1992; 1992–present
- Country: United States
- Branch: United States Air Force
- Role: Special Operations
- Size: 972 personnel authorized in 2015: 959 military personnel; 13 civilian personnel
- Part of: Air Force Special Operations Command
- Garrison/HQ: RAF Mildenhall, England, UK
- Motto: Ready Able (1961)
- Engagements: China-Burma-India Theater; Gulf War; Kosovo War; Nigerian bandit conflict: 2020 Nigeria hostage rescue
- Decorations: Air Force Outstanding Unit Award with Combat "V" Device; Gallant Unit Citation; Air Force Meritorious Unit Award; Air Force Outstanding Unit Award

Insignia
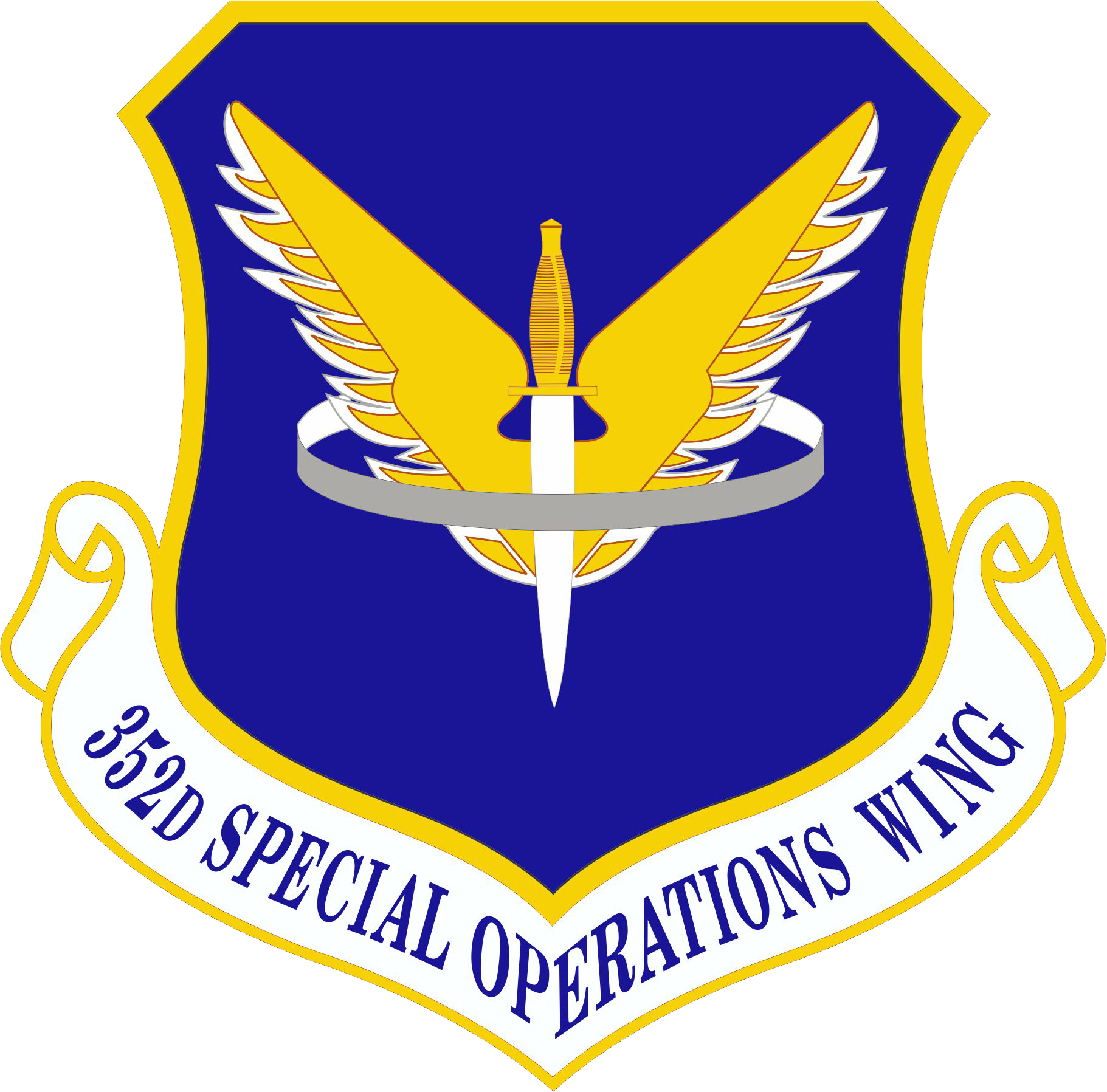
- 352nd Special Operations Wing emblem (Note: Approved 28 February 1995.)

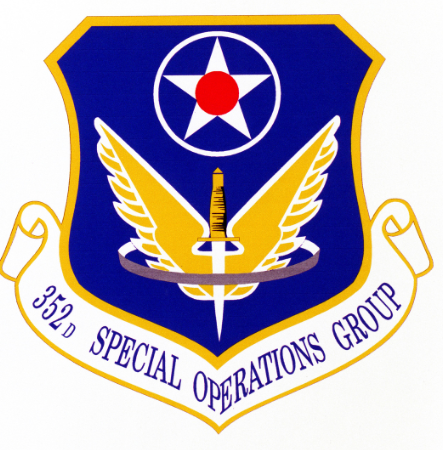
- 352nd Special Operations Group emblem (Note: Approved c. 1993.)

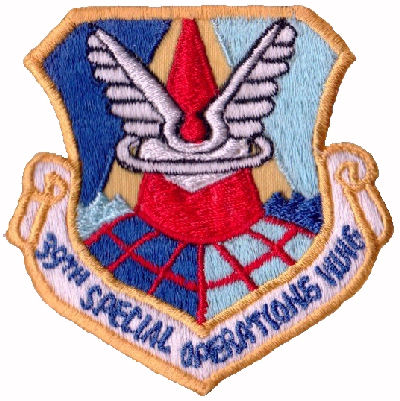
- Patch with 39th Special Operations Wing emblem

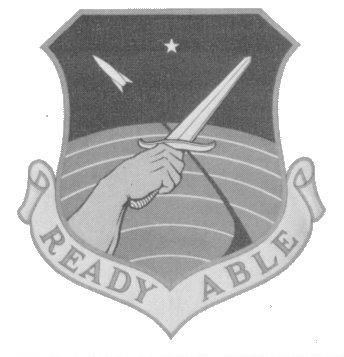
- 702nd Strategic Missile Wing emblem (Note: Approved 15 February 1961.)

The 352nd Special Operations Wing is an operational unit of the United States Air Force Special Operations Command currently stationed at RAF Mildenhall, United Kingdom. The unit's heritage dates back to 1944 as an air commando unit.

The 352nd Wing serves as the focal point for all U.S. Air Force special operations activities throughout the European theater for U.S. European Command (USEUCOM), as well as Africa for U.S. Africa Command (USAFRICOM) and Southwest Asia and the Middle East for U.S. Central Command. The wing is prepared to conduct a variety of high priority, low-visibility missions supporting U.S. and allied special operations forces during peacetime, joint operations exercises, and combat operations. It trains and performs special operations primarily in the USEUCOM and USAFRICOM area of operations, including establishing air assault landing zones, controlling close air support by strike aircraft and gunships, and providing trauma care for wounded and injured personnel.

The group's origins date to 1944 as the 2nd Air Commando Group. The unit was assigned to Tenth Air Force in India, whose elements operated in Burma flying a mixture of fighters, bombers, transports, military gliders and small planes performing operations behind the Japanese lines, and providing close air support for the British Fourteenth Army in the Burma campaign.

== Units ==
It is made up of the:

- 352nd Special Operations Wing, RAF Mildenhall
  - 752nd Special Operations Group
    - 7th Special Operations Squadron, with CV-22B Osprey tilt rotor aircraft
    - 67th Special Operations Squadron, with MC-130J Commando II aircraft
    - 321st Special Tactics Squadron
    - 352nd Special Operations Support Squadron
  - 352nd Special Operations Maintenance Group
    - 352nd Special Operations Maintenance Squadron
    - 352nd Special Operations Aircraft Maintenance Squadron
    - Joint Special Operations Air Component – Europe (JSOAC-E)

== History ==
The group's lineage and honors have to be traced not just through its own history, but through the history of three earlier organizations, the 2nd Air Commando Group (1944–1945); the 702nd Strategic Missile Wing (ICBM-Snark) (1959–1961) and the 39th Aerospace Rescue and Recovery (later Special Operations) Wing (1969–1992).

=== World War II ===
The Air Commando Groups were born out of a simple need. That was to support via light airplanes the evacuation and resupply requirements of British long range penetration groups, or Chindits, as they were affectionately called. Carrying the lethal firepower of both bombers and fighters combined with the logistical tentacles of a gamut of transports, gliders, and light aircraft, this organization would reach deep behind enemy lines to do battle.

Formed as the 2nd Air Commando Group at Lakeland Army Air Field, Florida on 22 April 1944 and sent to India under Colonel Arthur R. DeBolt. The group trained for operations with North American O-47s, North American P-51 Mustangs, Douglas C-47 Skytrains and Stinson L-5 Sentinel aircraft as part of Third Air Force and in addition to operations at Lakeland, also trained at the Army Air Force School of Applied Tactics at Orlando Army Air Base, Florida.

The 2nd Air Commando Group moved to India during October–December 1944 where it was assigned to Tenth Air Force, the troop carrier squadron flying their C-47s to India, arriving by late October; a group advanced echelon arriving in mid-November; and the majority of the group arriving in mid-December. The unit then served in the China-Burma-India Theater of operations, with the fighter units flying missions over Bangkok, Thailand. Between November 1944 and May 1945 the group dropped supplies to Allied troops who were fighting the Japanese in the Chindwin Valley in Burma; moved Chinese troops from Burma to China; transported men, food, ammunition, and construction equipment to Burma; dropped Gurka paratroops during the assault on Rangoon; provided fighter support for Allied forces crossing the Irrawaddy River in February 1945; struck enemy airfields and transportation facilities; escorted bombers to targets in the vicinity of Rangoon; bombed targets in Thailand; and flew reconnaissance missions.

After May 1945 the fighter squadrons were in training, and in June the group's C-47s were sent to Ledo to move road-building equipment. During June—July, most of its L-5s were turned over to Fourteenth Air Force. Following the collapse of the Japanese in Burma, the 2nd Air Commando Group was sent to Okinawa to prepare for the Operation Downfall, the invasion of Japan, but the war ended. The unit was sent to the United States beginning in October 1945 and disbanded on 12 November 1945.

=== Cold War ===
==== 702nd Strategic Missile Wing ====
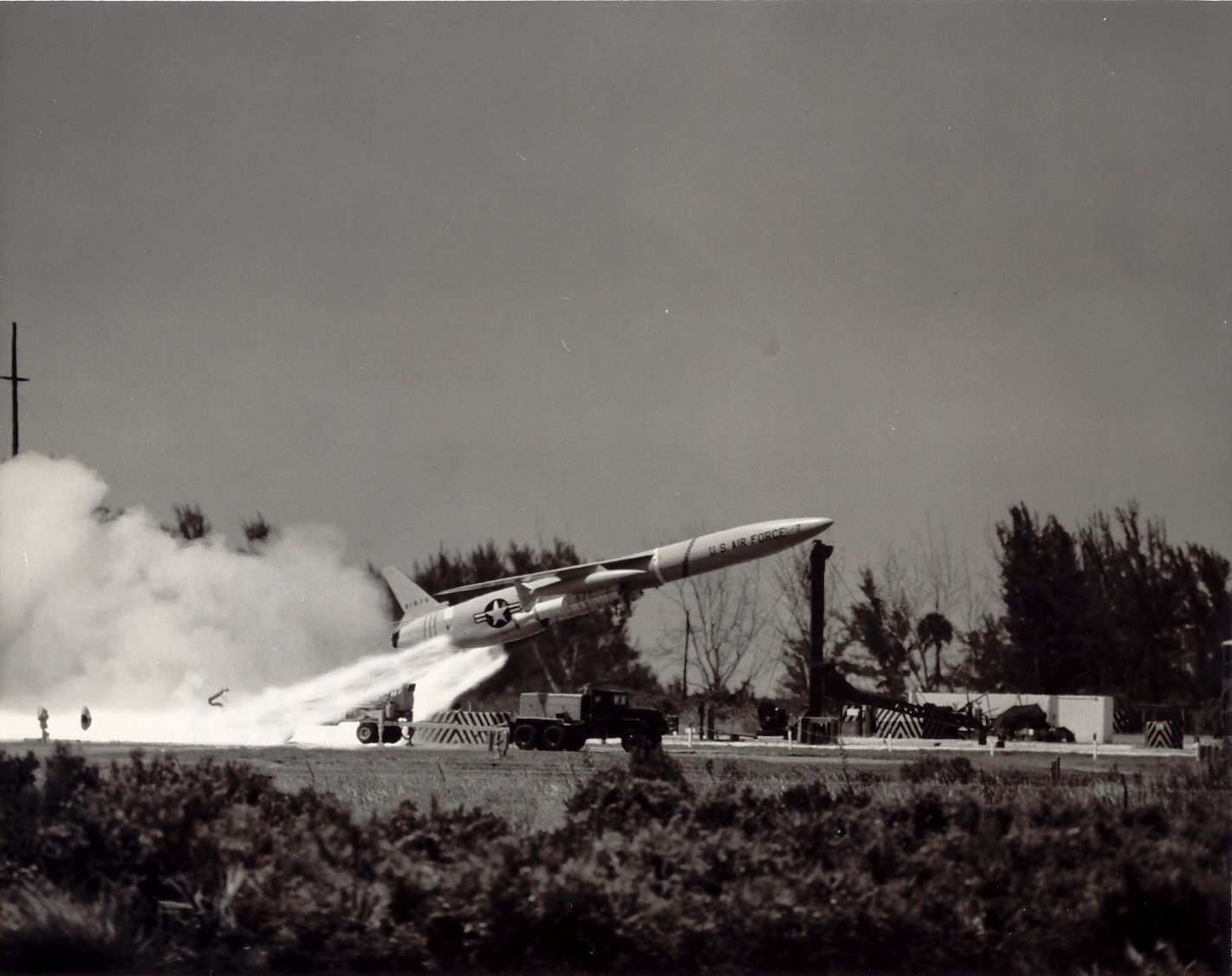
SAC Snark launching

The 702nd Strategic Missile Wing was organized in January 1959 at Presque Isle Air Force Base, Maine to be the only SM-62 Snark missile wing in the USAF. (Note: USAF originally planned to deploy twelve squadrons of Snarks. This was reduced to eight in November 1956, to two in December 1957, and ultimately to a single squadron in April 1958. Werrell, p. 197.) In April, the wing was assigned the 556th Strategic Missile Squadron, which performed intercontinental missile test operations from Patrick Air Force Base, Florida through June 1959. In July, the 556th moved to Presque Isle, where it was inactivated along with the wing's support organizations, and all Snarks were assigned directly to the wing. Test operations from the Atlantic Missile Range at Cape Canaveral Air Force Station, Florida, were resumed by a wing detachment c. December 1959, continuing until the wing was inactivated. On 27 May 1959, the wing received its first operational missile at Presque Isle. However, in November 1959, Strategic Air Command (SAC) recommended cancellation of the Snark program, a recommendation endorsed by Air Research and Development Command. However, this recommendation was rejected by Headquarters. USAF As a result, on 18 March 1960, the first Snark missile went on alert. Thirty are known to have been deployed. Exercises during 1960 indicated that only 20% of the wing's missile met SAC standards of effectiveness. SAC wanted 20% of its Snarks to be launched within 15 minutes, 40% within 75 minutes, and the entire force launched within four hours of notification. The missiles would accompany SAC's bomber force to complicate the problems of Soviet air defense systems.

The 702nd was not declared fully operational until 28 February 1961. Exactly one month later, in March 1961, President John F. Kennedy, in his budget message to Congress, declared the Snark "obsolete and of marginal military value" relative to ballistic missiles, and on 25 June 1961 the 702nd was inactivated. The 702nd Wing and 2nd Group were consolidated as the 352nd Special Operations Wing in July 1985, but remained inactive, redesignating as the 352nd Special Operations Group in September 1992 and activating in December of the same year. In August 1998, the 352nd consolidated with the 39th Special Operations Wing.

==== 39th Special Operations Wing ====
The 39th was originally established as the 39th Aerospace Rescue and Recovery Wing in 1969 as an Aerospace Rescue and Recovery Service unit under Military Airlift Command, to include rescue sorties during the Vietnam War from January 1970 until mid-1971, and also provided helicopter support to Strategic Air Command intercontinental ballistic missile sites in the United States. After moving to Eglin Air Force Base, Florida in June 1971, the wing assumed responsibility for numerous rescue detachments in the Western Hemisphere and Europe.

The 39th redesignated as the 39th Special Operations Wing at Eglin in 1989 and the unit trained and participated in special operations exercises, as well as continuing to fly rescue sorties. The wing headquarters and one squadron moved to Rhein-Main Air Base, West Germany in May 1989 and became the air component of Special Operations Command Europe (SOCEUR). In May 1990, following the establishment of Air Force Special Operations Command, the 39th transferred from MAC to AFSOC.

In response to Iraq's invasion of Kuwait on 2 August 1990, the majority of the 39 SOW personnel deployed to Turkey (12–17 January 1991), and operated as part of the Joint Special Operations Task Force Elusive Concept.

The wing moved to RAF Alconbury, England effective 1 January 1992 and continued to serve as the air component for SOCEUR. In December 1992, the 39th inactivated, replaced by the 352nd Special Operations Group and consolidating activities from Rhein-Main and RAF Woodbridge.

==== 352nd Special Operations Group ====
The 352nd trained for and performed special operations airland and airdrop missions in the U.S. European Command area of operations, including establishing air assault landing zones, controlling close air support by strike aircraft and gunships, and providing trauma care for wounded and injured personnel. Deployed elements also participated in Operation Provide Comfort II. During the 1990s, the group supported numerous humanitarian and combat operations in Europe, Africa, and Southwest Asia, including Operations Provide Promise, Deny Flight, and Allied Force in Yugoslavia, and Provide Comfort and Northern Watch over northern Iraq. In February 1995, the 352nd relocated from RAF Alconbury to its current home of RAF Mildenhall.

The 352nd were forward deployed to San Vito Air Station, Italy in support of NATO IFOR operations. Alert crews were launched when an Air Force Boeing T-43 Bobcat carrying U.S. Commerce Secretary Ron Brown crashed into a mountain. Arriving in a nasty rainstorm, 21st Special Operations Squadron Sikorsky MH-53 Pave Low helicopters inserted the first search-and-rescue teams, followed by a 67th Special Operations Squadron Lockheed MC-130P. RAF Mildenhall crews remained on scene until the last body was recovered. Upon completion of this operation, members of the 21st Special Operations Squadron departed via C-17 to support Operation Assured Response.

Operation Assured Response was a non-combatant evacuation (NEO) order signed by President Bill Clinton on 11 April 1996. With MH-53 postured in Freetown, Sierra Leone and MC-130 in Dakar, Senegal over 2000 non-combatants were ferried to safety from multiple locations throughout Liberia.

In 2002, the 352nd took part in Operation Autumn Return, the non-combatant evacuation of American citizens from Abidjan, Côte d'Ivoire.

Today, the 352nd develops and implements peacetime and wartime contingency plans to effectively use fixed wing, helicopter, and personnel assets to conduct infiltration, exfiltration, and resupply of U.S. and allied special operations forces.

==== 352nd Special Operations Wing ====
The 352nd SOG was upgraded to wing status in March 2015 with an anticipated move to Spangdahlem Air Base Germany in 2017, with the planned closure of RAF Mildenhall. However, as of July 2020, plans to close RAF Mildenhall have been scrapped.

In December 2024, the 352nd SOW received a new aircraft with the assignment of the Dornier C-146A Wolfhound to the wing.

== Lineage ==
2nd Air Commando Group

- Established as the 2nd Air Commando Group on 11 April 1944

Activated on 22 April 1944
Inactivated on 12 November 1945
Disestablished on 8 October 1948

- Reestablished and consolidated with the 702nd Strategic Missile Wing as the 352nd Special Operations Wing on 31 July 1985

702nd Strategic Missile Wing

- Established as the 702nd Strategic Missile Wing (ICBM-Snark) on 17 June 1958

Activated on 1 January 1959
Discontinued and inactivated on 25 June 1961

- Consolidated with the 2nd Air Commando Group as the 352nd Special Operations Wing on 31 July 1985

39th Special Operations Wing

- Established as the 39th Aerospace Rescue and Recovery Wing on 20 October 1969

Activated on 1 January 1970
Redesignated 39th Special Operations Wing on 1 March 1988
Inactivated on 1 December 1992

- Consolidated with the 352nd Special Operations Group as the 352nd Special Operations Group on 17 August 1998

352nd Special Operations Wing

- 2nd Air Commando Group and 702nd Strategic Missile Wing consolidated as the 352nd Special Operations Wing on 31 July 1985
- Redesignated 352nd Special Operations Group on 21 September 1992

Activated on 1 December 1992

- Consolidated with the 39th Special Operations Wing on 17 August 1998

Redesignated 352nd Special Operations Wing on 23 March 2015

=== Assignments ===
- III Fighter Command, 22 April 1944
- Army Air Forces, India-Burma Theater, c. 12 November 1944
- Tenth Air Force, 10 July 1945
- Army Air Forces, India-Burma Theater, c. 18 August–October 1945
- 45th Air Division, 1 January 1959 – 25 June 1961
- Aerospace Rescue and Recovery Service, 1 January 1970
- Twenty-Third Air Force (later, Air Force Special Operations Command), 1 October 1983 – 1 December 1992
- Air Force Special Operations Command, 1 December 1992 – present (attached to 352nd Special Operations Wing, Provisional, 14 January–23 March 2015)

=== Components ===
Groups

- 352nd Special Operations Maintenance Group, 23 March 2015 – present
- 752nd Special Operations Group, 23 March 2015 – present

Squadrons

- 1st Fighter Reconnaissance Squadron (later 1st Fighter Squadron, Commando): 22 April 1944 – 12 November 1945
- 2nd Fighter Reconnaissance Squadron (later 2nd Fighter, Commando): 22 April 1944 – 12 November 1945
- 7th Special Operations Squadron: 1 February 1987– 23 March 2015
- 9th Special Operations Squadron: 1 March 1988 – 18 April 1989
- 21st Special Operations Squadron: 1 May 1988 - 31 October 2007
- 37th Aerospace Rescue and Recovery Squadron: 1 July 1978 – 1 February 1987
- 38th Aerospace Rescue and Recovery Squadron: 1 July 1978 – 8 January 1981
- 40th Aerospace Rescue and Recovery Squadron: 1 July 1978 – 31 December 1987
- 41st Aerospace Rescue and Recovery Squadron: 1 January 1970 – 1 September 1975
- 42nd Aerospace Rescue and Recovery Squadron: 1 January 1970 – 15 June 1973
- 43rd Aerospace Rescue and Recovery Squadron: 1 January 1970 – 1 June 1974
- 44th Aerospace Rescue and Recovery Squadron: 1 January 1970 – 15 June 1973
- 48th Aerospace Rescue and Recovery Squadron: 15 September 1972 – 1 January 1976; 1 October 1985 – 31 December 1987
- 54th Aerospace Rescue and Recovery Squadron: 1 January 1970 – 15 July 1974
- 55th Aerospace Rescue and Recovery Squadron (later 55th Special Operations Squadron): 1 January 1970 – 18 April 1989 (Note: Haulman incorrectly identifies the 37th through 55th Squadrons as "Air Rescue and Recovery" units.)
- 56th Aerospace Rescue and Recovery Squadron: 1 May 1988 – 1 April 1989
- 67th Aerospace Rescue and Recovery Squadron (later 67th Special Operations Squadron): 17 May 1973 – 23 March 2015
- 71st Aerospace Rescue and Recovery Squadron: 8 March 1970 – 1 July 1974
- 127th Liaison Squadron, 1 May 1944 – 27 July 1945
- 155th Liaison Squadron, 1 May 1944 – 27 July 1945
- 156th Liaison Squadron, 1 May 1944 – 27 July 1945
- 317th Troop Carrier Squadron, 1 May 1944 – 12 November 1945
- 321st Special Tactics Squadron: 1 January 1993 – 23 March 2015
- 556th Strategic Missile Squadron: 1 April–16 July 1959

=== Stations ===
- Drew Field, Florida, 22 April 1944
- Lakeland Army Air Field, Florida, 3 May 1944
- Alachua Army Air Field, Florida, 9 June 1944
- Drew Field, Florida, 17 August 1944
- Lakeland Army Air Field, Florida, 22 August 1944
- Drew Field, Florida, 23–28 October 1944
- Kalaikunda Air Force Station, India, 16 December 1944
- Karachi Airport, India, 5–21 October 1945
- Camp Kilmer, New Jersey, 11–12 November 1945
- Presque Isle Air Force Base, Maine, 1 January 1959 – 25 June 1961
- Richards-Gebaur Air Force Base, Missouri, 1 January 1970
- Eglin Air Force Base, Florida, 25 June 1971 – May 1989
- Rhein-Main Air Base, Germany, 1 June 1989
- RAF Alconbury, England, 1 January 1992
- RAF Mildenhall, England, 17 February 1995 – present

=== Aircraft and missiles ===
==== World War II ====
- North American P-51 Mustang, 1944, 1945
- Stinson L-5 Sentinel, 1944, 1945
- Noorduyn C-64 Norseman, 1944, 1945
- Douglas C-47 Skytrain, 1944–1945
- Waco CG-4, 1944, 1945
- North American F-6 Mustang, 1945
- Stinson L-1 Vigilant, 1945
- Piper L-4 Cub, 1945
- Curtiss C-46 Commando, 1945

==== Cold War ====
- Northrop SM-62 Snark, 1959–1961
- Sikorsky CH-3, 1970-c.1988
- Sikorsky HH-3 Jolly Green Giant, 1970-c.1988
- Sikorsky CH-53 Sea Stallion, 1970-c.1988
- Sikorsky HH-53C Super Jolly, 1970-c.1988
- Lockheed HC-130, 1970-c.1990
- Kaman HH-43 Huskie, 1970–1973
- Bell UH-1 Huey, 1970–1988
- Bell HH-1 Huey, 1978-c.1988
- Bell TH-1 Huey, 1978-c.1988
- Sikorsky UH-60 Black Hawk, 1982-c.1988

==== Post Cold War ====
- MC-130P Combat Shadow, 1987–2014
- Sikorsky MH-53 Pave Low, 1989–2007
- MC-130H Combat Talon II, 1994–2015
- Lockheed MC-130J Commando II, 2013–present
- Bell Boeing CV-22B Osprey, 2013–present
- Dornier C-146A Wolfhound, 2024–present
