= RAF Mildenhall =

Royal Air Force station in Suffolk, England

RAF Mildenhall
- Mildenhall, Suffolk in England
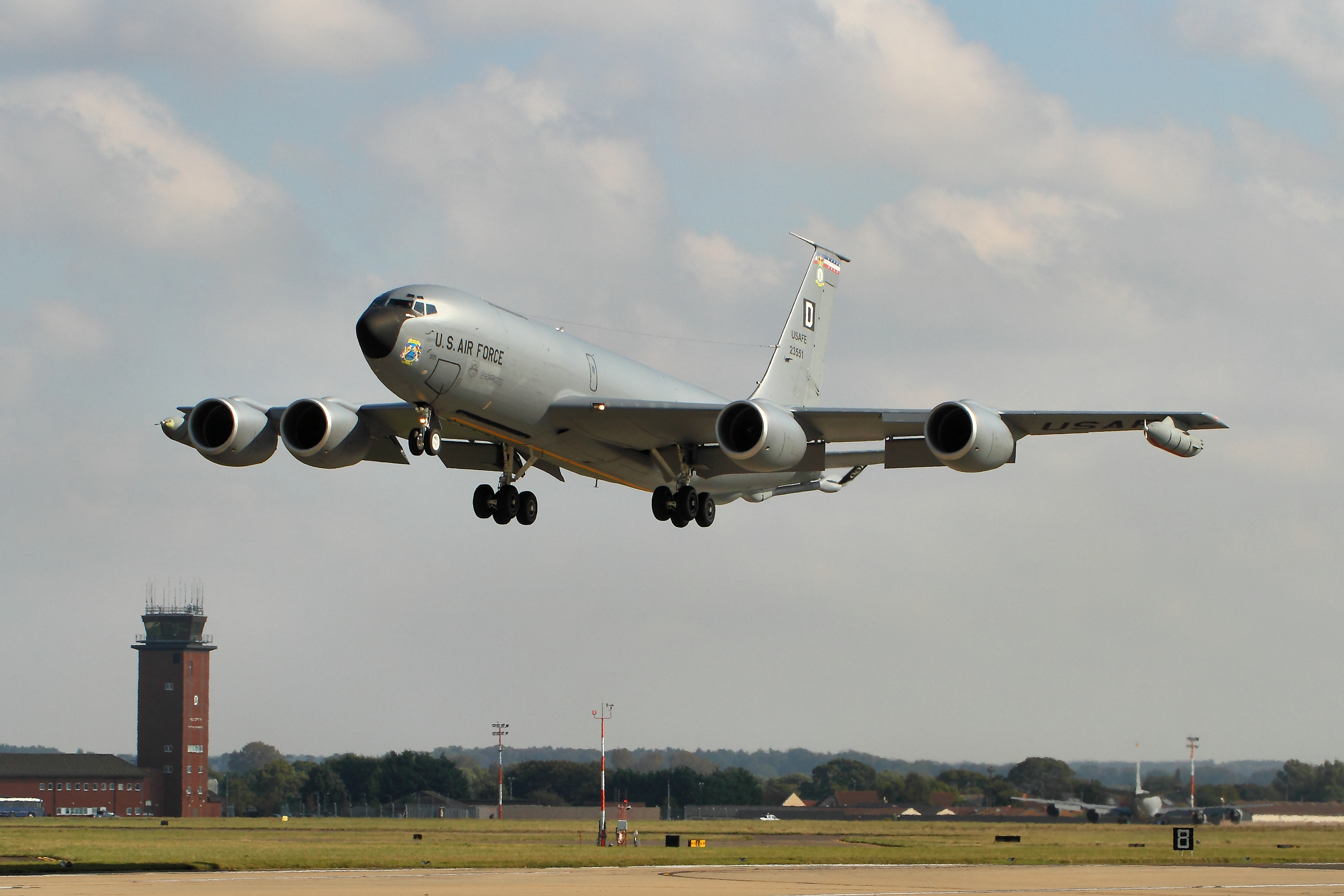
- A Boeing KC-135R Stratotanker of the 100th ARW at RAF Mildenhall.

- Ut aquilae volent (Latin for 'That eagles may fly')

Site information
- Type: RAF station (US Visiting Forces)
- Owner: Ministry of Defence
- Operator: US Air Force
- Controlled by: US Air Forces in Europe – Air Forces Africa (USAFE-AFAFRICA)
- Condition: Operational
- Website: www.mildenhall.af.mil

Location
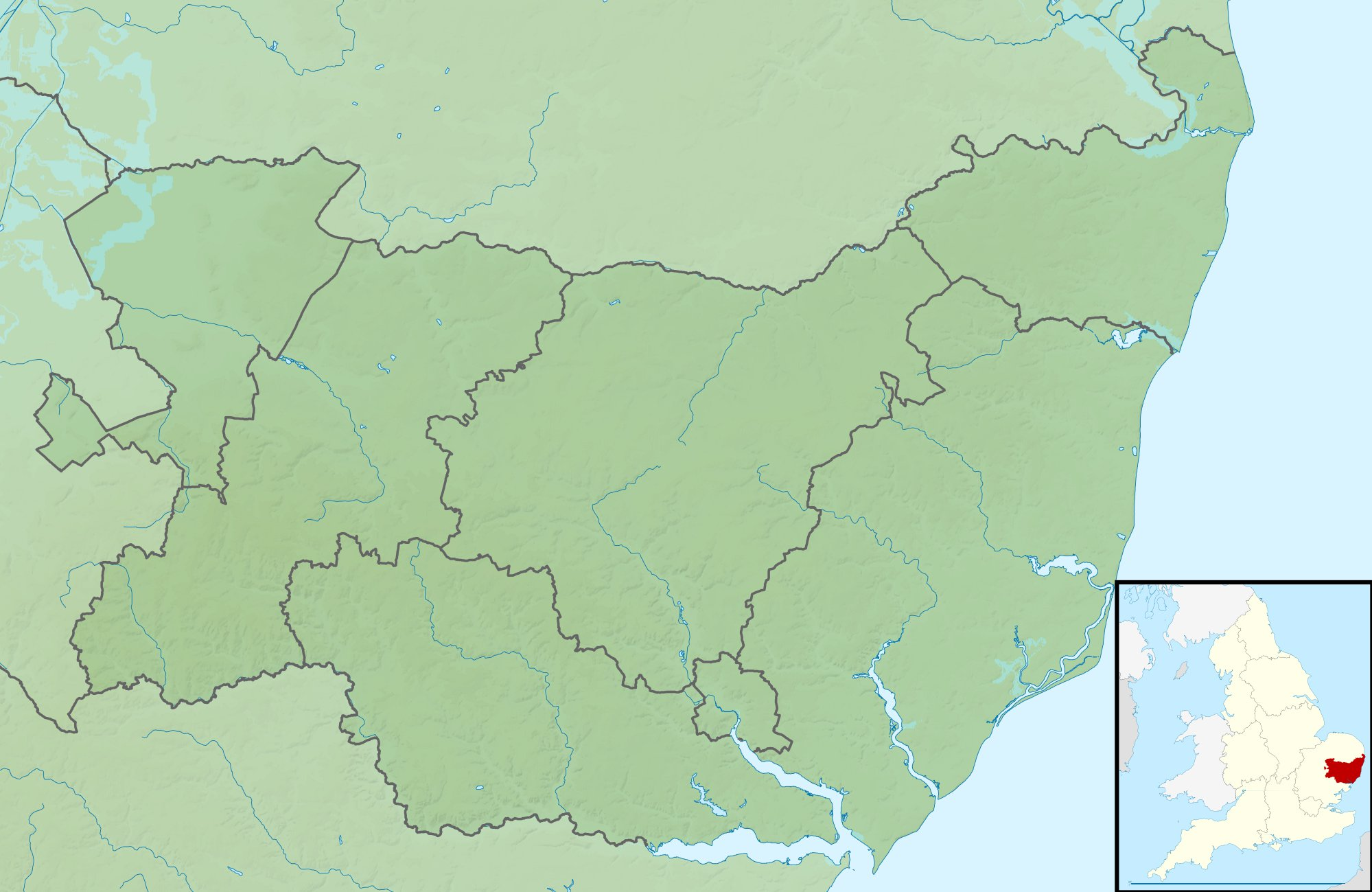
- Location within Europe Location within the United Kingdom Location within Suffolk Location within North Atlantic
- Coordinates: 52°21′54″N 000°28′51″E
- Grid reference: TL685768
- Area: 482 hectares

Site history
- Built: 1934
- In use: 1934–1950 (Royal Air Force); 1950–1959 (Joint RAF/USAF); 1959–present (US Air Force)

Garrison information
- Garrison: 100th Air Refueling Wing; 352d Special Operations Wing; 501st Combat Support Wing

Airfield information
- Identifiers: IATA: MHZ, ICAO: EGUN, WMO: 03577
- Elevation: 10.3 metres (34 ft) AMSL
Runways
Direction	Length and surface
10/28	2,808 metres (9,213 ft) Concrete/Asphalt
- Source: UK MIL AIP Mildenhall

Royal Air Force Mildenhall, or more simply RAF Mildenhall (IATA: MHZ, ICAO: EGUN), is a Royal Air Force station located near Mildenhall in Suffolk, England. Despite its status as a Royal Air Force station, it primarily supports United States Air Force (USAF) operations, and is the home of the 100th Air Refueling Wing (100 ARW).

During the Second World War, RAF Bomber Command used the station for operational combat missions until 1945. Placed on standby status after the war, it was reopened by the Royal Air Force and became a USAF-RAF joint operation base on 11 July 1950. It was assigned to Strategic Air Command (SAC), and began hosting B-50 Superfortresses in 1951, and KC-97 Stratofreighters from 1953 until 1958. The Military Air Transport Service transferred its main United Kingdom terminal to Mildenhall in 1958.

In the late 1970s and throughout the 1980s U-2 and SR-71 Blackbird operations took place from the base. On 8 January 2015, the United States Department of Defense announced that operations at RAF Mildenhall would end and be relocated to Germany (Spangdahlem Air Base) and elsewhere within the UK. After a period of uncertainty it was confirmed in July 2020 that the relocation of operations would no longer take place. RAF Mildenhall, alongside its sister base RAF Lakenheath, have the largest United States Air Force presence in the United Kingdom.

== History ==
=== Early years (1930s) ===
In order to meet a perceived 'continental threat', the British military developed the idea to site a Royal Air Force bomber base at Mildenhall in the late 1920s. Shortly thereafter, the government purchased the land in 1929, followed by the completion of the first buildings in 1931. Three years later, RAF Mildenhall opened on 16 October 1934, as one of the RAF's largest bomber stations. On the same day, Wing Commander Francis Linnell, assumed his position as the first station commander.

RAF Mildenhall's premature inauguration was due in large part with its selection to host the Royal Aero Club's prestigious MacRobertson Air Race on 20 October 1934. At the time, the air race stood as the longest race ever devised, and attracted over 70,000 spectators to the airfield. Even more telling of the race's significance in the world's sporting spotlight, on short notice King George V and Queen Mary visited RAF Mildenhall the day before the race. In the end, pilots Tom Campbell Black and C. W. A. Scott flying the de Havilland Comet Grosvenor House, crossed the finish line first at Melbourne, Australia, less than 72 hours after starting the race.

Following this favourable beginning, RAF Mildenhall received its first squadron and aircraft with the arrival of No. 99B Squadron, equipped with Handley Page Heyford bombers. King George V reviewed 350 aircraft at Mildenhall in 1935 on the occasion of his Silver Jubilee. This historical event is commemorated by a memorial tablet located in front of the Building 562, the current 100th Air Refueling Wing headquarters.

The threat the RAF had envisioned in the late 1920s materialised during the Munich Crisis. Between 26 September 1938 and 4 October 1939, the airfield completed its installation of its defence systems. After a brief reprieve from war, the airfield prepared for war, bringing station defences and squadrons to full combat readiness. On 3 September 1939, three days after Germany invaded Poland, Britain and France declared war on Germany. Later that same day, three Vickers Wellington aircraft from No. 149 Squadron at Mildenhall were dispatched to bomb the German naval fleet at Wilhelmshaven.

=== Second World War (1939–1945) ===
Throughout Second World War, RAF Mildenhall remained active as in addition to its own airfield, the base had responsibility for RAF Newmarket, RAF Tuddenham, and RAF Lakenheath. During the course of the war, the base witnessed the transition from the two-engine Wellington, to the four-engine Short Stirling, and finally to the Avro Lancaster.

By the end of the war, aircraft from Mildenhall and its satellite airfields had dropped over 23,000 tons of explosives, laid 2,000 mines and flew over 8,000 sorties. The airfield also saw the loss of over 200 Wellington, Stirling, and Lancaster bombers with the loss of over 2,000 aircrew. One of those killed, was Pilot Officer Rawdon Hume Middleton, an Australian who was posthumously awarded the Victoria Cross and is buried at St. Johns Church cemetery in Beck Row after his body was washed ashore.

==== Target for Tonight ====
During the last two weeks of March and the first two weeks of April 1941, Mildenhall was used for the making of the film Target for Tonight. So as not to give away important information to the enemy, Mildenhall took the fictitious name of Millerton Aerodrome and several other aspects involving the day-to-day operations were altered. The film, produced by the Crown Film Unit, focused on the planning and execution of an air raid on Germany, as seen by the crew of Vickers Wellington OJ-F 'F for Freddie'.

Wellingtons and their crews from the resident No. 149 Squadron, coded OJ, were used for the filming. The exception to this was Percy Pickard who was at that time Squadron Leader with No. 311 (Czechoslovak) Squadron. Pickard played the part of Squadron Leader Dickson, the captain of 'F for Freddie'. Pickard would go on to lead daring raids such Operation Biting and the later Operation Jericho on Amiens Prison, in which he was killed.

=== Postwar (1945–1950) ===
After the war, aircraft from Mildenhall flew home repatriated prisoners of war in Operation Exodus, and participated in Operation Manna, dropping relief supplies to the Dutch people stranded by the flooding caused by the retreating German Wehrmacht. By the end of 1945, Mildenhall's operational activity experienced a drastic decrease and despite a brief flurry of flying activity in the late 1940s, the RAF reduced the base to 'care and maintenance' status. The only remaining RAF unit of significance was Headquarters No. 3 Group, part of Bomber Command, which remained on station until 1967.

The following RAF units operated from Mildenhall:

- No. 3 Blind Approach Training Flight RAF (1940) became No. 1503 (Beam Approach Training) Flight RAF (1941)
- No. 3 Group Communications Flight RAF (1937–41 and 1946–64)
- No. 4 (Bomber) Group RAF
- No. 5 (Bomber) Group RAF
- No. 25 Heavy Glider Maintenance Section RAF
- No. 32 Base RAF
- No. 149 Conversion Flight RAF
- No. 401 (Meteorological) Flight RAF (1941)
- No. 1505 (Beam Approach Training) Flight RAF (1942)
- Engine Consumption Unit RAF (1942) became No. 1 Engine Consumption Unit RAF (1942)
- Regional Control School RAF (1940)

=== Cold War (1950–1991) ===
==== Strategic Air Command ====
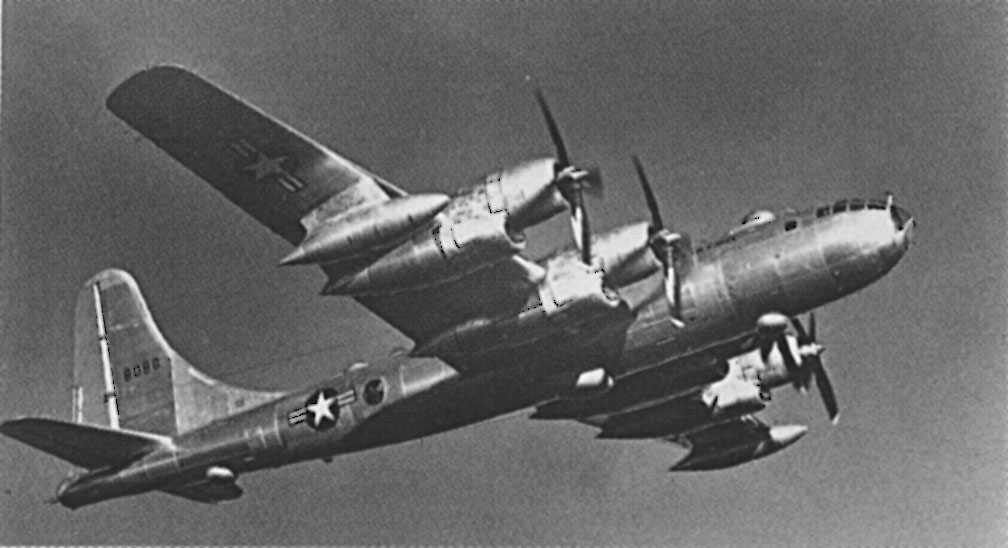
A Boeing B-50D Superfortress

The initial Strategic Air Command unit to use Mildenhall was the 7511th Air Base Group (later redesignated 3910th Air Base Group), being activated on 11 July 1950, to prepare the facility for operational use by SAC aircraft. On 1 May 1951, SAC took control of the station rotated bomb wings in and out of Mildenhall on temporary duty assignments. The first operational strategic unit to use the airfield was the Boeing B-50D Superfortress equipped 2nd Bomb Wing, arriving on Temporary Duty (TDY) from Hunter AFB in Georgia on 4 May 1951.

Other rotational strategic bomb wings at Mildenhall were:

- 22nd Bombardment Wing (7 September 1951 – 12 December 1951) (B-50D, KB-29P) (TDY from March AFB California)
- 93rd Bombardment Wing (16 December 1951 – 8 March 1952) (B-50D, KB-29P) (TDY from Castle AFB California)
- 509th Bombardment Wing (4 June 1952 – 2 September 1952) (B-50D, KB-29P) (TDY from Walker AFB New Mexico)

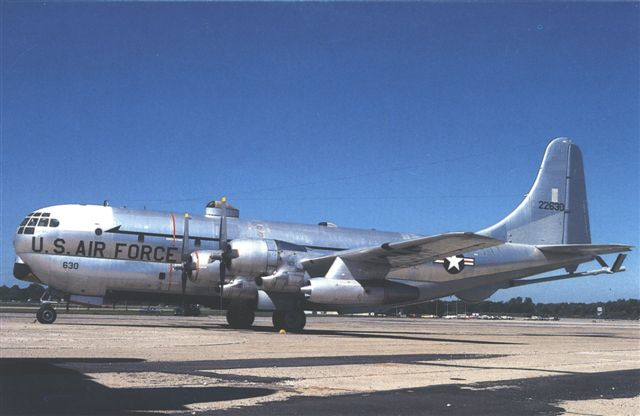
A Boeing KC-97 Stratofreighter, 1951

In 1953, Mildenhall's mission was changed from a B-50 bomber airfield to a KC-97 Stratofreighter aerial tanker dispersal base. The role was to support Boeing B-47 Stratojet aircraft based at RAF Fairford. The base became the home for the United Kingdom Passenger Terminal managed by Military Air Transport Service (MATS) in 1958.

===== 7513th Tactical Group =====
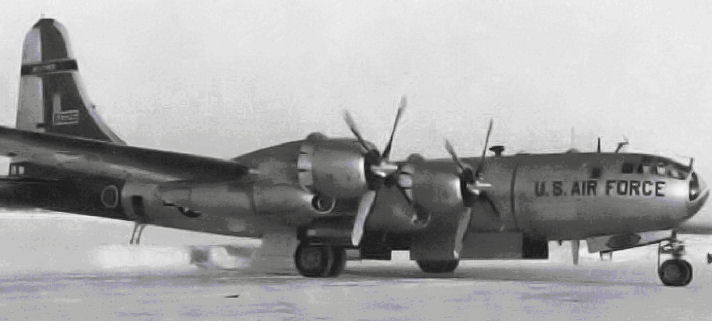
A WB-50D of the 58th Weather Squadron

SAC departed Mildenhall in 1959, as its runway capabilities no longer met the requirements for its newer aircraft. On 17 July 1959, SAC and USAFE reached an agreement facilitating and substantially increasing Third Air Force's role in making operational decisions regarding the USAF units in the UK. On 1 September, the 7513th Tactical Group took over host unit responsibilities.

On 15 November 1965 Mildenhall welcomed the arrival of the Silk Purse Control Group and the 7120th Airborne Command and Control Squadron (7120 ACCS) previously stationed at Chateauroux Air Station, France. Upon its arrival at Mildenhall, the 7120th ACCS converted from the Douglas C-118 to the Boeing EC-135 which were used as airborne command posts for the Commander, US European Command under the code name Operation Silk Purse.

===== 513th Tactical Airlift Wing =====
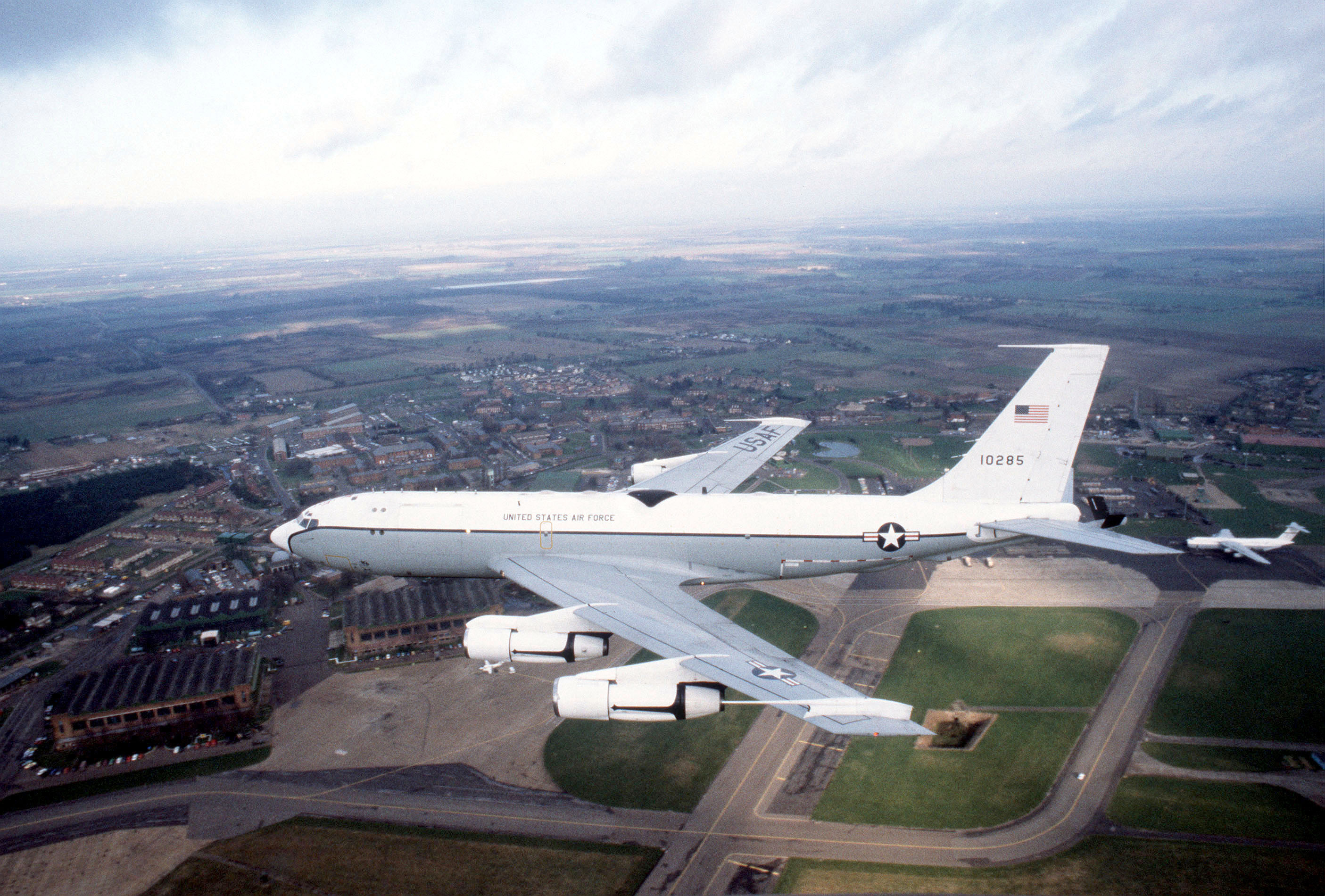
A EC-135H Silk Purse of the 10th Air Control Center Squadron flying over Mildenhall in 1983

On 1 July 1966, the 513th Troop Carrier Wing arrived at Mildenhall from Evreux-Fauville Air Base in France. With its activation on Mildenhall, the 513th TCW assumed operational control of two rotational (7441st, 7742nd) Troop Carrier Squadrons of twenty C-130 Hercules as well as the 7120th ACCS / Silk Purse Control Group and the five Boeing EC-135H.

For the next few years, Mildenhall witnessed little change: in June 1972, the base added to the list of its tenants with the arrival of Headquarters Third Air Force, which relocated from South Ruislip.

In May 1969, mechanic Sergeant Paul Meyer, homesick for his wife in Virginia, stole a Hercules C-130E transporter and flew south, eventually ditching in the English Channel. In April 2018 an underwater search for the aircraft, using sonar, was announced by the Deeper Dorset group.

===== 306th Strategic Wing =====
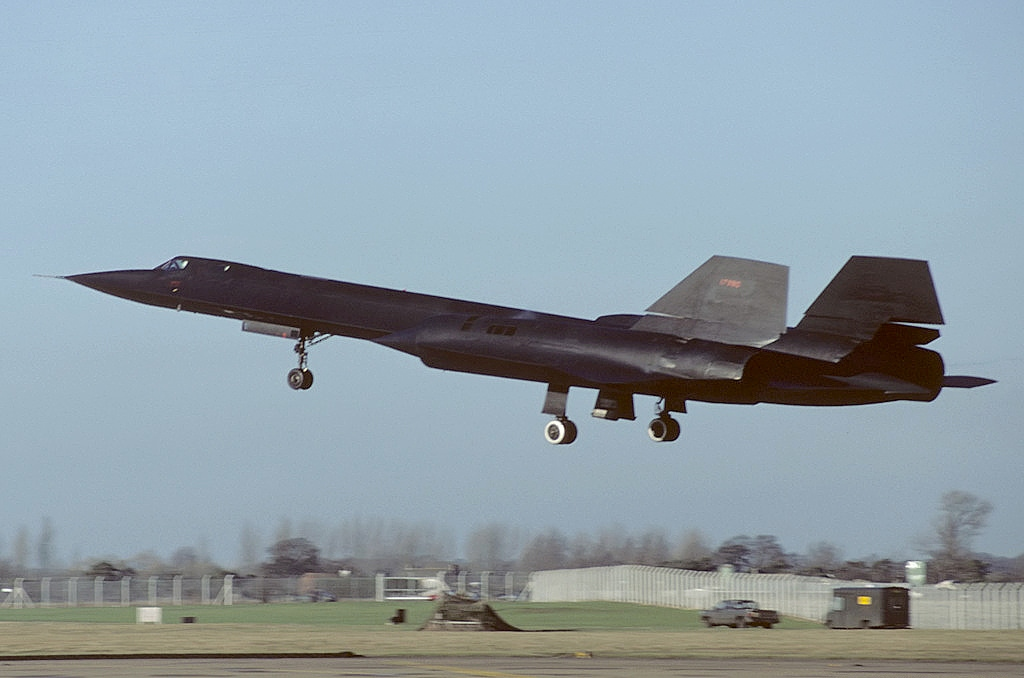
A SR-71A Blackbird of the 9th Strategic Reconnaissance Wing's Detachment 4 taking off from Mildenhall in 1985

The next significant event in Mildenhall's history came with the arrival of Detachment 4, 9th Strategic Reconnaissance Wing (9th SRW) in 1976, which controlled rotational U-2 and SR-71 Blackbird operations from the base. From their arrival, until the departure of the last SR-71 on 18 January 1990, the 306th Strategic Wing's SR-71 and U-2 aircraft came to symbolise RAF Mildenhall in the local public's eye.

On 1 July 1978, the 306th Strategic Wing of SAC was transferred to Mildenhall from Ramstein Air Base, West Germany with a Boeing KC-135 Stratotanker air refuelling and a Boeing RC-135 reconnaissance mission. The 306th SW also functioned as the focal point for all SAC operations in Europe, and became the host unit at Mildenhall.

=== Post Cold War (1990s) ===
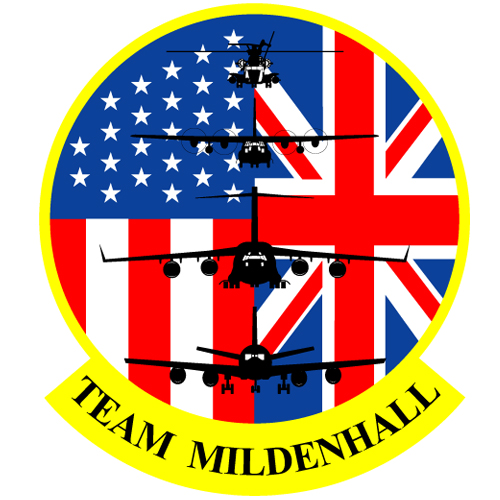
Team Mildenhall logo

The 306th Strategic Wing operated at RAF Mildenhall until 1 February 1992, when the 100th Air Refueling Wing of USAFE, assumed the 306th SW responsibilities, and became host unit at Mildenhall, along with becoming Headquarters European Tanker Task Force with its KC-135 Stratotankers.

In May 1993, as part of the drawdown of forces in Europe, it was announced that the majority of the USAF-operated base at RAF Alconbury was to be returned to the British Ministry of Defence. As a part of this return, the 352nd Special Operations Group and its associated aircraft, the MC-130E Combat Talon, HC-130P/N Combat King and MH-53 Pave Low, transferred to RAF Mildenhall in March 1995.

=== 2000–present ===
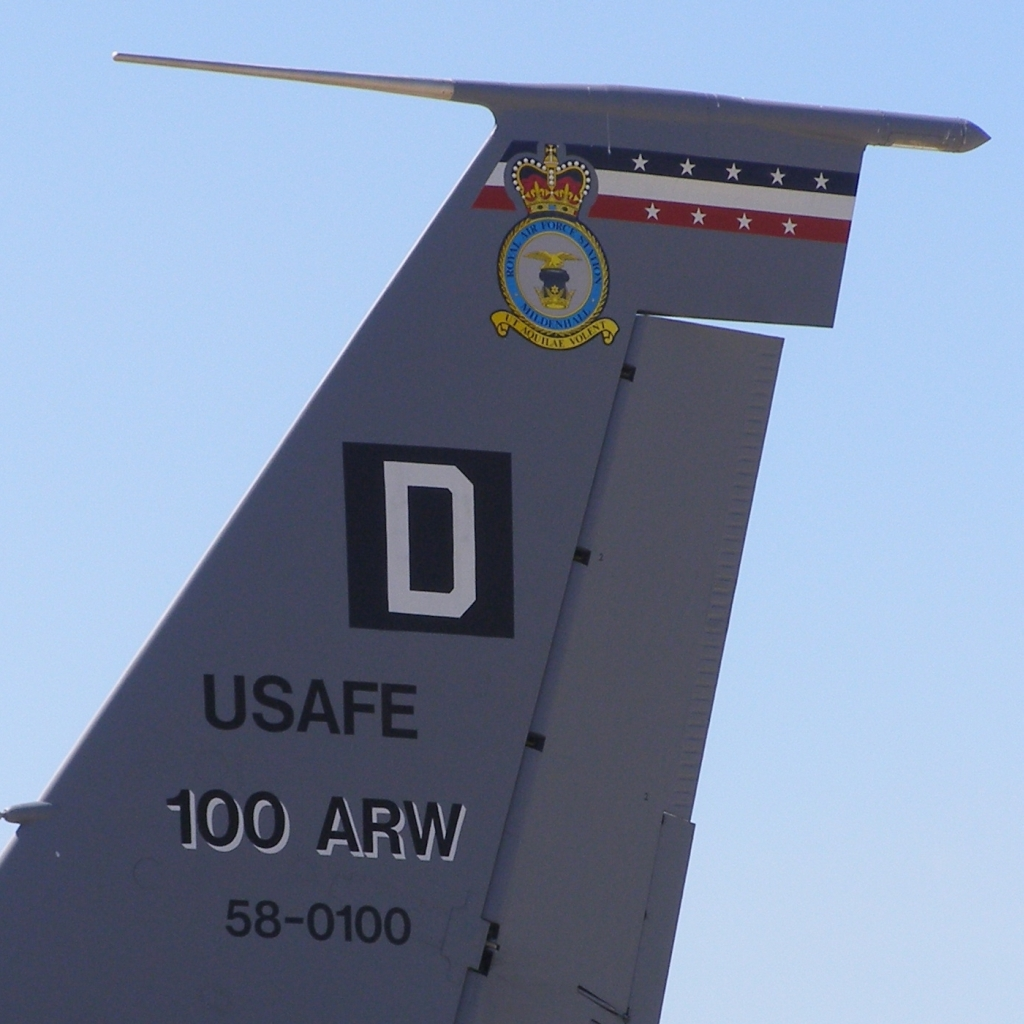
A tail of a KC-135R Stratotanker assigned to the 100th Air Refuelling Wing, displaying the badge of RAF Mildenhall and the historic 'Square D' badge as used by the unit during the Second World War

During the 2003 invasion of Iraq, the 491st Air Expeditionary Group (491st AEG) operated from the base, with the 491st Air Expeditionary Aeromedical Evacuation Squadron and the 744th Expeditionary Airlift Squadron, flying the Lockheed C-141C Starlifter. Also attached to the 491st AEG was the 791st Expeditionary Aeromedical Airlift Squadron, now located at Ramstein Air Base, Germany.

The 501st Combat Support Wing was activated at RAF Mildenhall on 21 May 2005. It was a non-flying unit that provides administration and operation of units at RAF Croughton (422nd Air Base Group), RAF Alconbury (423rd Air Base Group) and RAF Fairford (420th Air Base Group). The wing moved to RAF Alconbury on 1 May 2007.

In June 2021 President of the United States Joe Biden and First Lady Jill Biden flew to RAF Mildenhall on Air Force One for the 47th G7 summit and their first meeting with Queen Elizabeth II. President Biden addressed troops on base shortly after landing.

In April 2023, during President Joe Biden's visit to Northern Ireland and the Republic of Ireland, an E-4B Nightwatch callsign "GRIM99" was seen flying over Wales and landed at RAF Mildenhall.

In 2024, between 20 November and 22 November, small unmanned aerial systems (UASs) were spotted in the vicinity of and over RAF Mildenhall, part of wider drone incursions at US air bases in the United Kingdom. The number of UASs fluctuated and they ranged in size and configuration. F-15E Strike Eagles, based at Lakenheath, were allegedly scrambled in response to the drones as they impacted local flight operations. RAF Regiment personnel were later deployed to the bases with the ORCUS C-UAS system in response to a second sighting of unidentified drones in the night hours of 25 November.

On 10 November 2026, the US military flew up to 12 aircraft, including nine tankers and three Osprey transporters, out of RAF Mildenhall to bases in Germany and Spain after a reported threat from Iran, and raised the base's security status to FPCON Charlie, the second-highest defensive threat level. The move followed the withdrawal of B-1 bombers from RAF Fairford weeks earlier after a suspected Iran-linked security incident there in September. The British Ministry of Defence said that aircraft and other military assets regularly move between locations according to operational requirements. A US Air Force spokesperson said that American aircraft rotate between installations and operating locations for various reasons.

== Major US Air Force units assigned ==
Major units assigned included:

- 7511th Air Base Squadron, 11 July – 26 September 1950

redesignated: 7511th Air Base Group, 26 September 1950 – 1 February 1953
redesignated: 3910th Air Base Group, 1 February 1953 – 15 April 1955

- 2nd Bombardment Wing (deployed), 4 May – 31 August 1951
- 22nd Bombardment Wing (deployed), 7–12 September 1951
- 93rd Bombardment Wing (deployed), 6 December 1951 – 2 March 1952
- 97th Bombardment Wing (deployed), 1 April – 11 June 1952
- 509th Bombardment Wing (deployed), 4 June – 2 September 1952
- 3913th Air Base Squadron, 15 April 1955 – 1 January 1959

redesignated: 3913th Combat Support Group, 1 January – 1 September 1959

- 53rd Weather Reconnaissance Squadron, 10 August 1959 – 18 March 1960
- 1625th Support Squadron (MATS), 1 March 1959 – 8 January 1966
- 7513th Air Base Group, 1 September 1959 – 1 July 1966

redesignated: 7513th Tactical Group

- 513th Tactical Airlift Wing, 1 July 1966 – 1 February 1992
- 627th Military Airlift Support Squadron, 8 January 1966 – 15 September 1978
- Third Air Force, 15 April 1972 – 1 November 2005
- 435th Tactical Airlift Group, 1 July 1975 – 15 September 1978
- 306th Strategic Wing, 1 July 1978 – 1 February 1992
- 313th Tactical Airlift Group, 15 September 1978 – 1 February 1992
- 100th Air Refueling Wing, 1 February 1992 – present
- 95th Reconnaissance Squadron, 1 July 1994 – present
- 352nd Special Operations Group, 17 February 1995 – present
- 501st Combat Support Wing, 12 May 2005 – 30 April 2007

== Based units ==
Flying and notable non-flying units based at RAF Mildenhall:

Units marked GSU are Geographically Separate Units, which although based at Mildenhall, are subordinate to a parent unit based at another location.

=== United States Air Force ===
United States Air Forces in Europe - Air Forces Africa (USAFE-AFAFRICA)

- Third Air Force
  - 100th Air Refuelling Wing
    - Headquarters 100th Air Refuelling Wing
    - 100th Comptroller Squadron
    - 100th Operations Group
      - 100th Operations Support Squadron
      - 351st Air Refuelling Squadron – KC-135R Stratotanker
    - 100th Maintenance Group
      - 100th Aircraft Maintenance Squadron
      - 100th Maintenance Squadron
    - 100th Mission Support Group
      - 100th Civil Engineer Squadron
      - 100th Communications Squadron
      - 100th Force Support Squadron
      - 100th Logistics Readiness Squadron
      - 100th Security Forces Squadron
- United States Air Forces in Europe – United Kingdom

Air Mobility Command (AMC)

- Eighteenth Air Force
  - 521st Air Mobility Operations Wing
    - 721st Air Mobility Operations Group
      - 727th Air Mobility Squadron (GSU)

Air Force Special Operations Command (AFSOC)

- 352nd Special Operations Wing
  - 752nd Special Operations Group
    - 7th Special Operations Squadron – CV-22 Osprey
    - 67th Special Operations Squadron – MC-130J Commando II
    - 321st Special Tactics Squadron
    - 352nd Special Operations Support Squadron
  - 352nd Special Operations Maintenance Group
    - 752nd Special Operations Aircraft Maintenance Squadron
    - 352nd Special Operations Aircraft Maintenance Squadron

Air Combat Command (ACC)

- Sixteenth Air Force
  - 55th Wing
    - 55th Operations Group
      - 95th Reconnaissance Squadron (GSU) – RC-135
      - 488th Intelligence Squadron (GSU)
  - 363rd Intelligence, Surveillance and Reconnaissance Wing
    - 361st Intelligence, Surveillance and Reconnaissance Group
      - 25th Intelligence Squadron
        - Detachment 2 (GSU)

=== United States Navy ===
United States Naval Forces Europe-Africa (CNE-CNA)

- Fleet Industrial Supply Center Sigonella, Detachment Mildenhall (Naval Supply Systems Command)
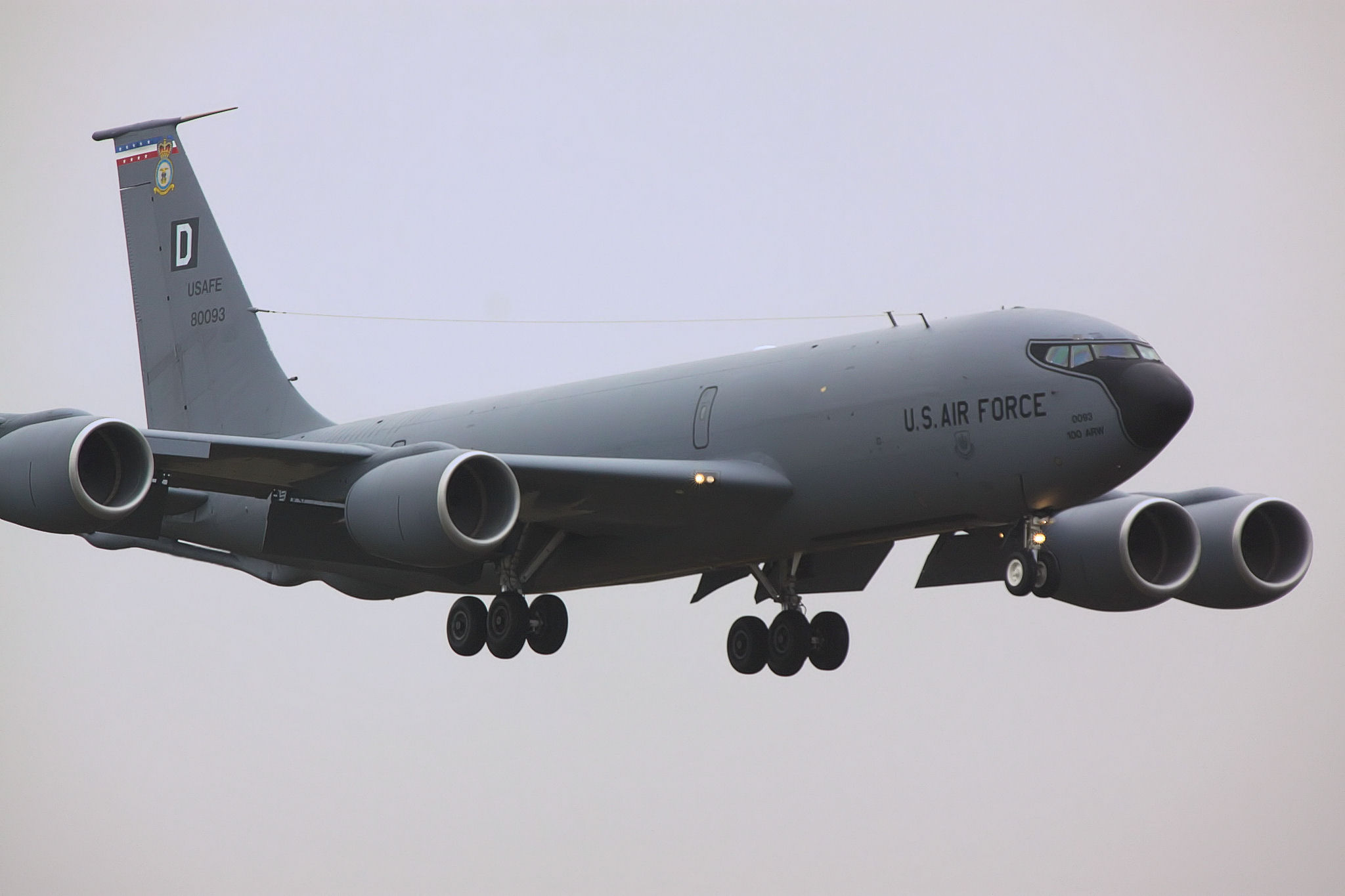
A KC-135R Stratotanker of the Mildenhall based 100th Air Refueling Wing

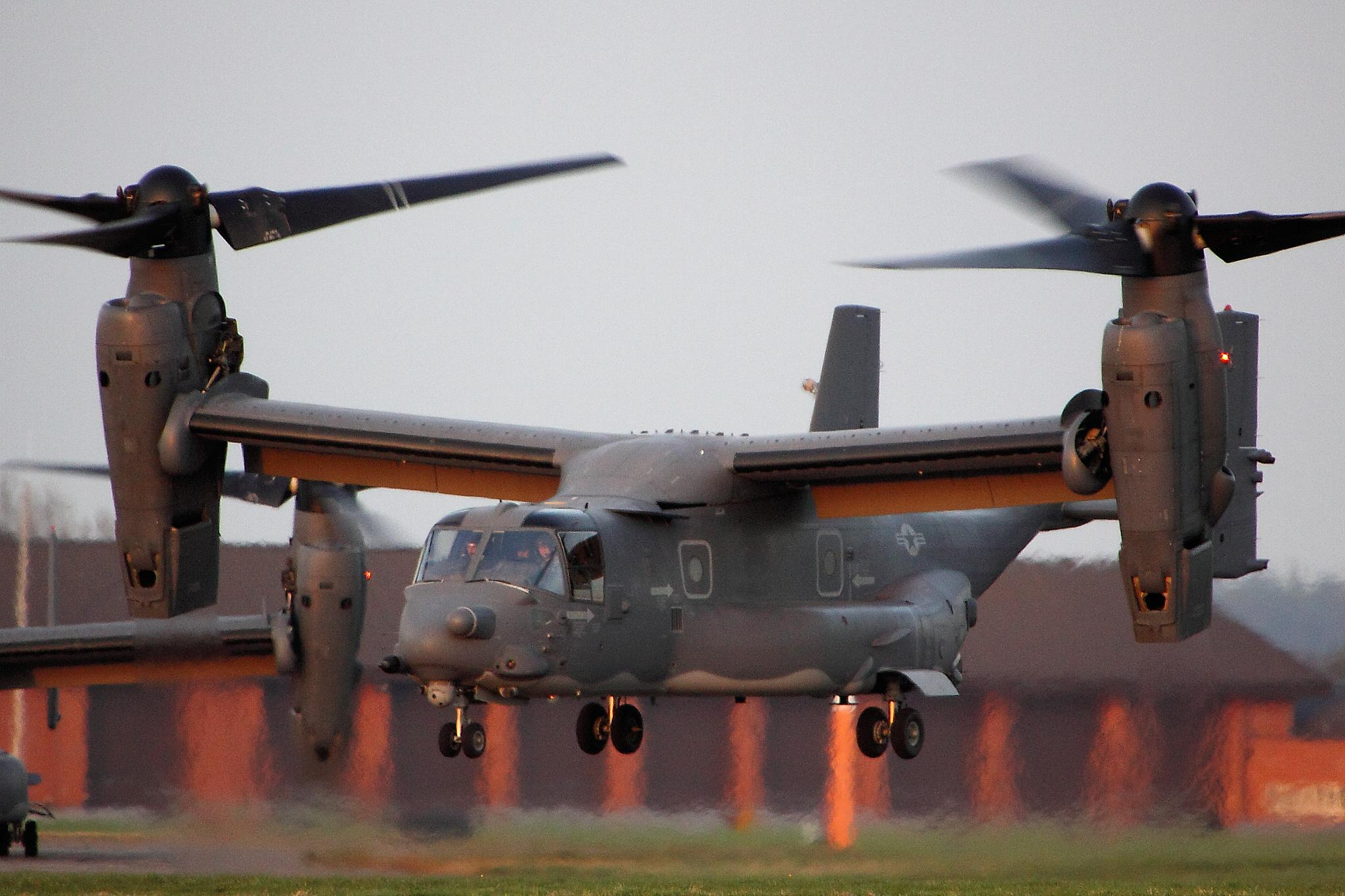
A CV-22B Osprey of the Mildenhall based 352nd Special Operations Wing

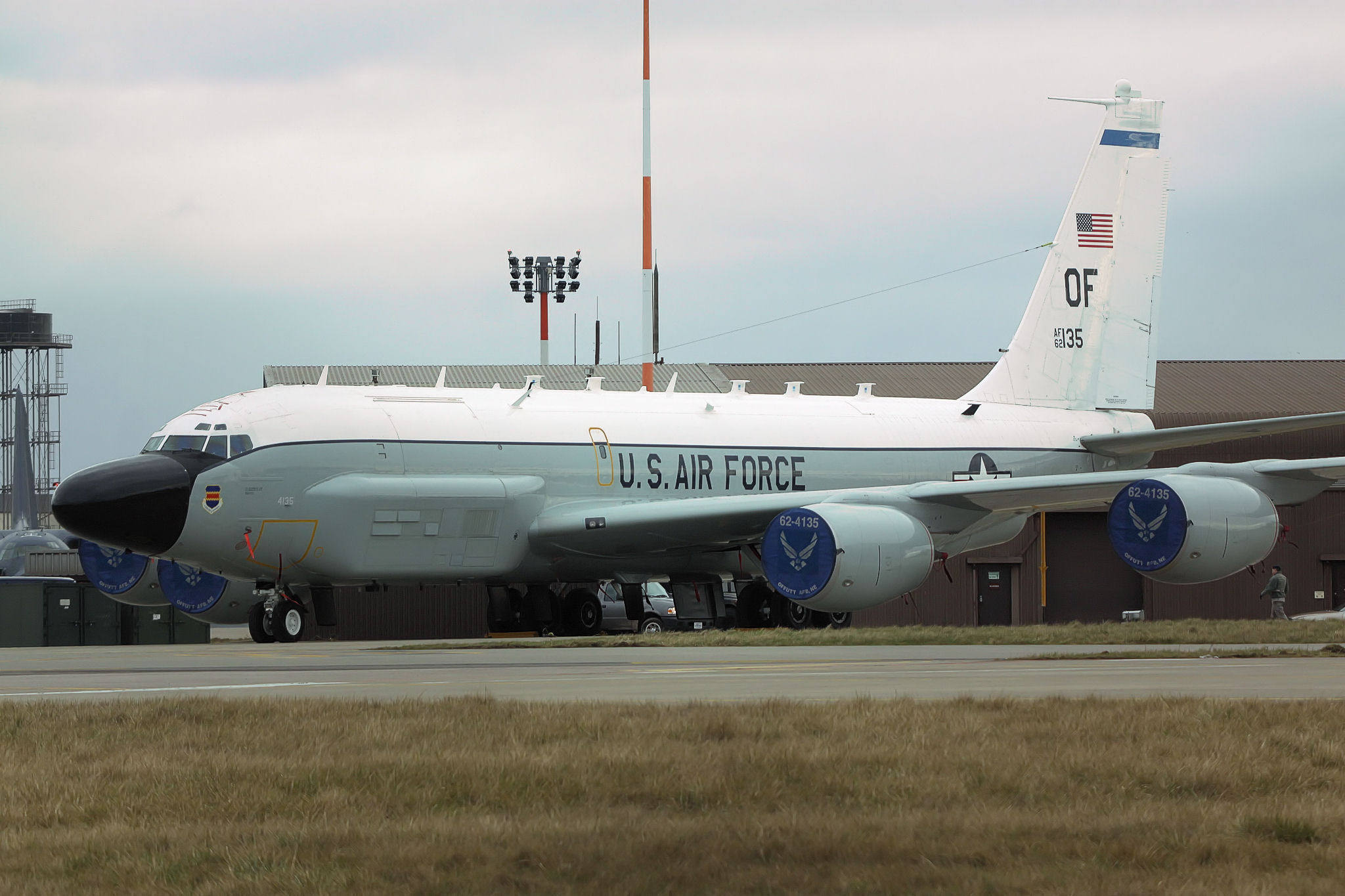
A Boeing RC-135W Rivet Joint of the 55th Wing seen at RAF Mildenhall during 2010

== Airlines and destinations ==
Airlines	Destinations
Space-A	Charleston AFB, Dover AFB, MacDill AFB, McConnell AFB, McGuire AFB, Ramstein Air Base, Seymour Johnson AFB, Travis AFB

== Future ==
On 8 January 2015, the United States Department of Defense announced that as part of their European Infrastructure Consolidation (EIC) programme, they would be withdrawing from RAF Mildenhall to help save $500 million a year across Europe. In January 2016, as a result of the proposed US withdrawal, the UK government announced the site was one of twelve that would be sold as part of their strategy for the Ministry of Defence estate, although no date for the sale was given. It was planned to relocate units based at Mildenhall to Spangdahlem Air Base in Germany.

A change in political administration in the United States, heightened security concerns on the part of the United States, the UK and NATO pertaining to Europe and the Middle East, and a variety of other issues prompted a reassessment on Mildenhall's closure. By 2017, the closure process had been put on indefinite hold and in February 2020, it was reported it had been extended to at least 2027. In July 2020, the Department of Defense announced that the US military would be withdrawing from Spangdahlem and that the 100th Air Refueling Wing and 352nd Special Operations Wing would remain at Mildenhall, thereby keeping the base open for the foreseeable future.

== Protests ==
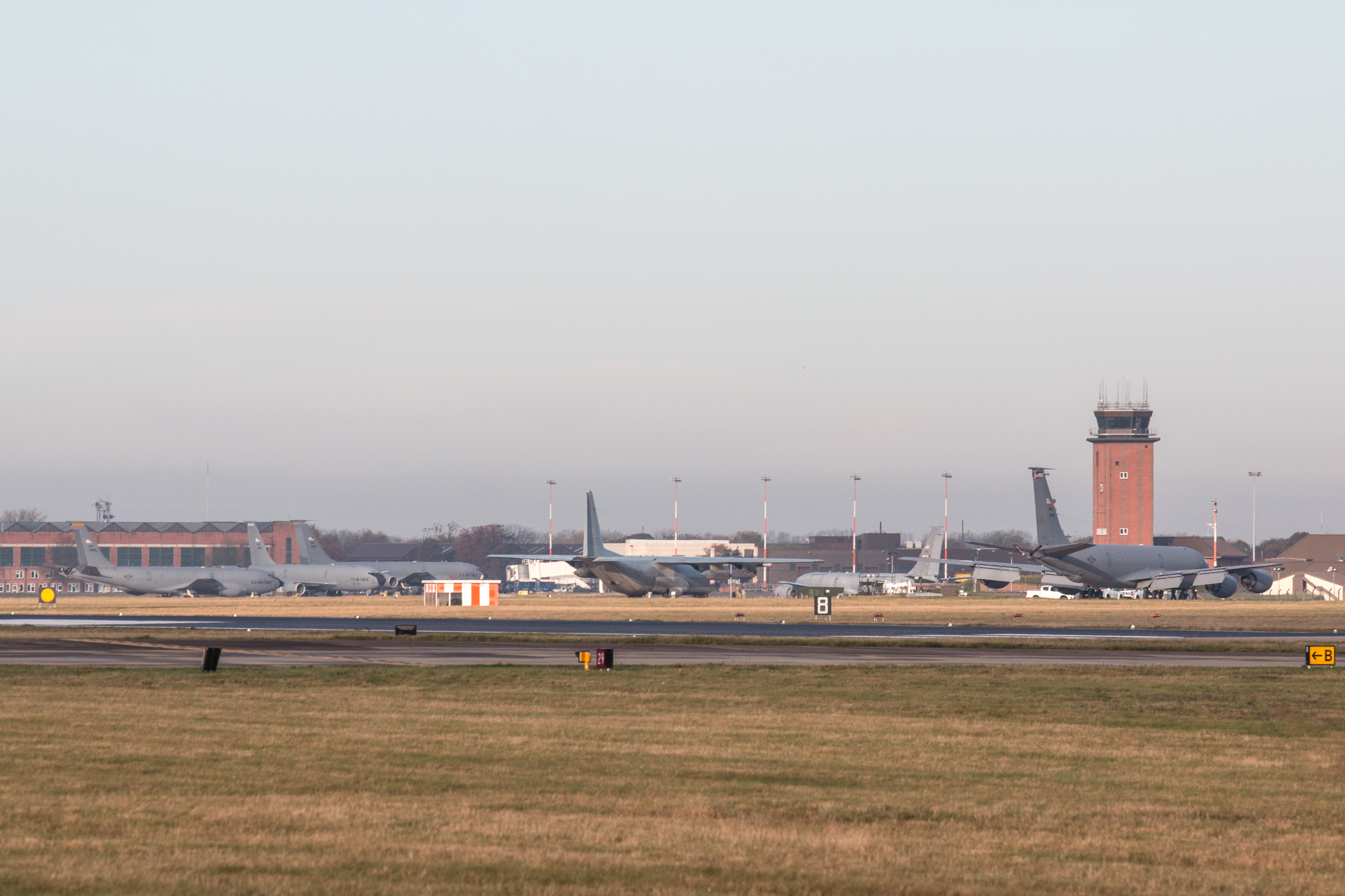
Aircraft parked at RAF Mildenhall in 2014

Since the beginning of its use by the USAF, Mildenhall has been the site of many anti-war protests by the Campaign for Nuclear Disarmament and other peace groups. In January 2003, students cut a hole in the perimeter fence and accessed the base. Later, in April 2003, protestors with Stop the War Coalition broke into the base to unfurl a banner with the words: "Stop Killing Each Other".

Notable protesters include MP and former Labour party leader Jeremy Corbyn and former CND chair Kate Hudson.

== See also ==
- List of Royal Air Force stations
- RAF Thorpe Abbotts
- Strategic Air Command in the United Kingdom
- RAF Lakenheath
