= Air Force Special Operations Command =

Air Force component of the U.S. Special Operations Command

Air Force Special Operations Command (AFSOC)
- Air Force Special Operations Command emblem
- Active: 10 February 1983 – present (43 years, 9 months) Detailed: 22 May 1990 – present (as Air Force Special Operations Command) 10 February 1983 – 22 May 1990 (as 23d Air Force)
- Country: United States of America
- Branch: United States Air Force
- Type: Major Command
- Role: "Raise and Retain Disciplined Professionals; Air Commandos Ready for Any Challenge."
- Size: 17,967 personnel authorized: 15,724 military personnel; 2,243 civilian personnel
- Part of: United States Special Operations Command
- Headquarters: Hurlburt Field, Florida, U.S.
- Nickname: "Air Commandos"
- Motto: "Any place. Any time. Anywhere"
- Decorations: Air Force Organizational Excellence Award Air Force Outstanding Unit Award
- Website: www.afsoc.af.mil

Commanders
- Commander: Lt Gen Michael E. Conley
- Deputy Commander: Brig Gen William “Clay” Freeman
- Command Chief Master Sergeant: CMSgt Courtney C. Freeman

Insignia
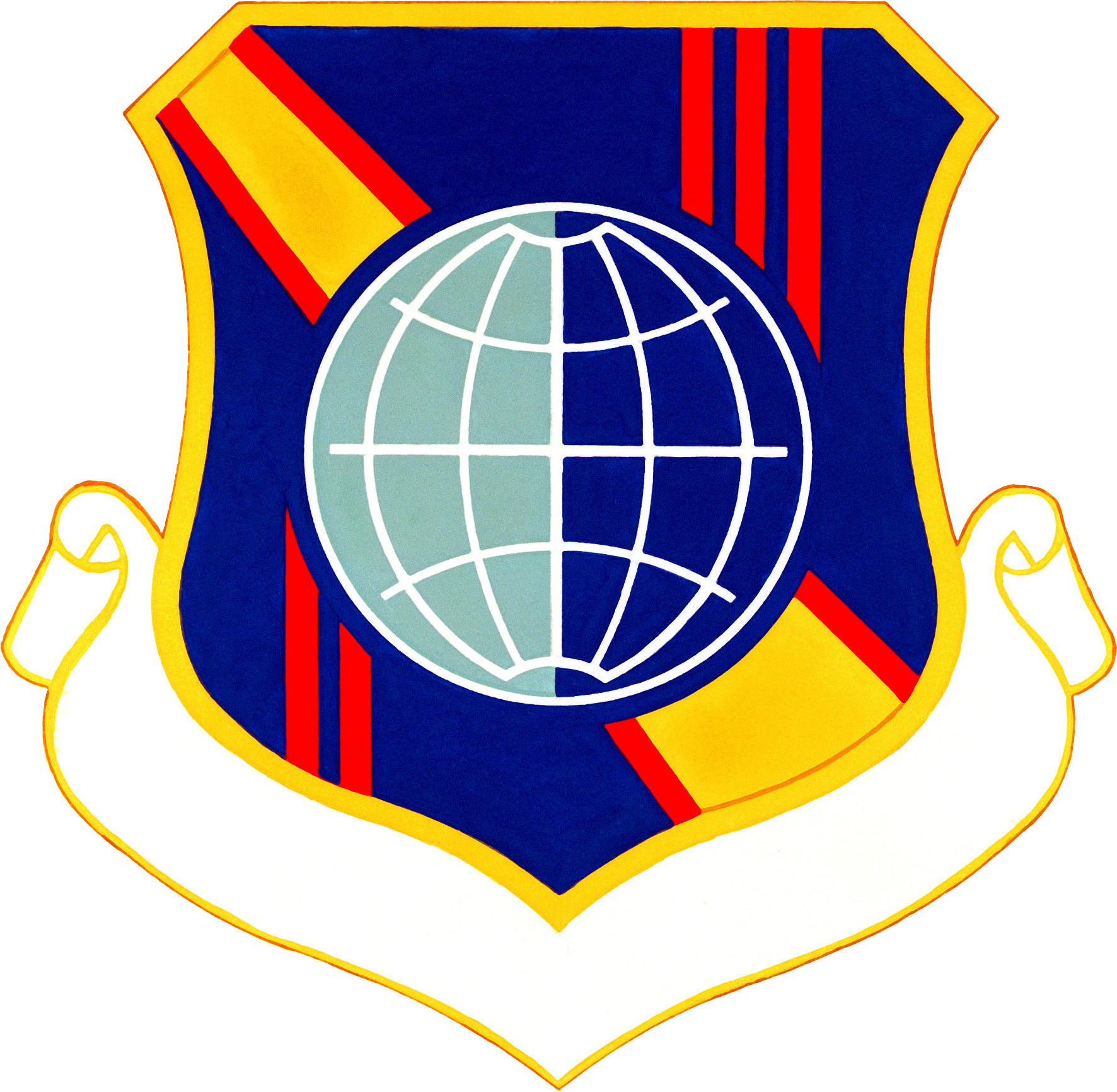
- Twenty-Third Air Force shield (former) (approved May 1983)

Aircraft flown
- Attack: AC-130J, MQ-9
- Reconnaissance: U-28A, OA-1K Skyraider II
- Transport: C-145A, C-146A, CV-22B
- Tanker: MC-130J, HC-130J

Air Force Special Operations Command (AFSOC), headquartered at Hurlburt Field, Florida, is the special operations component of the United States Air Force. An Air Force major command (MAJCOM), AFSOC is also the U.S. Air Force component command to United States Special Operations Command (USSOCOM), a unified combatant command located at MacDill Air Force Base, Florida. AFSOC provides all Air Force special operations forces (SOF) for worldwide deployment and assignment to regional unified combatant commands.

Before 1983, Air Force special operations forces were primarily assigned to the Tactical Air Command (TAC) and were generally deployed under the control of U.S. Air Forces in Europe (USAFE) or, as had been the case during the Vietnam War, Pacific Air Forces (PACAF). Just as it had relinquished control of the C-130 theater airlift fleet to Military Airlift Command (MAC) in 1975, TAC relinquished control of Air Force SOF to MAC in December 1982.

AFSOC was initially established on 10 February 1983 as Twenty-Third Air Force (23 AF), a subordinate numbered air force of MAC, with 23 AF headquarters initially established at Scott Air Force Base, Illinois. On 1 August 1987, 23 AF headquarters moved to Hurlburt Field, Florida. AFSOC elements include Combat Controllers (CCT), Pararescuemen (PJ), Special Reconnaissance (SR), and Tactical Air Control Party (TACP).

== Predecessor USAAF and USAF special operations units ==
=== World War II ===
- 1st Air Commando Group: Late 1943 – November 1945
- Operation Carpetbagger: Early 1944 – July 1945

=== Korean War ===
- Air Resupply and Communications Service: 23 February 1951 – 12 October 1956
- Combined Command Reconnaissance Activities, Korea: December 1951 – December 1953
- B Flight, 6167th Operations Squadron: 1 April 1952 – 31 December 1953
- 6004th Air Intelligence Service Squadron: c. March 1951 – 1955
- 6006th Air Intelligence Service Squadron: c. 1953–1955
- 22nd Crash Rescue Boat Squadron: c. July 1952 – 1954
- 580th Air Supply and Communications Wing
- 581st Air Supply and Communications Wing: July 1951 – September 1955
- 582nd Air Supply and Communications Wing

=== Early Cold War era ===
- 129th Air Resupply Group: April 1955 – c. 1975
- 130th Air Resupply Group: October 1955 – c. 1960
- 135th Air Resupply Group: August 1955 – c. 1971
- 143rd Special Operations Group: November 1955 – 1975
- 1045th Observation, Evaluation, and Training Group: 23 February 1951 – 1 January 1954

=== Vietnam War era ===
- Jungle Jim / 4400th Combat Crew Training Squadron
- Farm Gate
- Operation Waterpump
- Raven Forward Air Controllers
- Project 404
- Palace Dog
- 56th Air Commando Wing

=== Late Cold War era ===
- 4400th Combat Crew Training Group
- 1st Special Operations Wing
- Twenty-Third Air Force

== Lineage ==
- Established as Twenty-Third Air Force on 10 February 1983

Activated on 1 March 1983
Redesignated Air Force Special Operations Command and made a major command on 22 May 1990

=== Assignments ===
- Military Airlift Command, 1 March 1983
- United States Air Force, 22 May 1990 – present

=== Stations ===
- Scott AFB, Illinois, 1 March 1983
- Hurlburt Field, Florida, 1 August 1987 – present

=== Components ===
- Air Forces Special Operations Center (redesignated 623d Air and Space Operations Center): 13 December 2005 – 1 January 2008
- Twenty-Third Air Force (Air Forces Special Operations Forces): 1 January 2008 – 4 April 2013
- AFSOC Operations Center: 4 April 2013 – present
- 2nd Air Division, 1 March 1983 – 1 February 1987
- Aerospace Rescue and Recovery Service, 1 March 1983 – 1 August 1989
- Air Rescue Service, 1 August 1989 – 1993
- 1st Special Operations Wing, 1 February 1987 – present
- 24th Special Operations Wing, 12 June 2012 – 16 May 2025
- 27th Special Operations Wing, 1 October 2007 – present
- 41st Rescue and Weather Reconnaissance Wing, 1 October 1983 – 1 August 1989
- 352nd Special Operations Wing, 1 October 1983 – present
- 353rd Special Operations Wing, 6 April 1989 – present
- 375th Aeromedical Airlift Wing: 1 January 1984 – 1 February 1990
- 492nd Special Operations Wing: 10 May 2017 – present
- 720th Special Tactics Group: 1 October 1987 – Present
- 724th Special Tactics Group: 29 April 2011 – Present
- 1550th Aircrew Training and Test Wing (later, 1550th Combat Crew Training Wing): 1 October 1983 – 21 May 1990
- USAF Special Operations School, 1 February 1987 – 22 May 1990
- Air Force Special Operations Training Center, 8 October 2008 – 11 February 2013
- Air Force Special Operations Air Warfare Center, March 5, 2024 - present

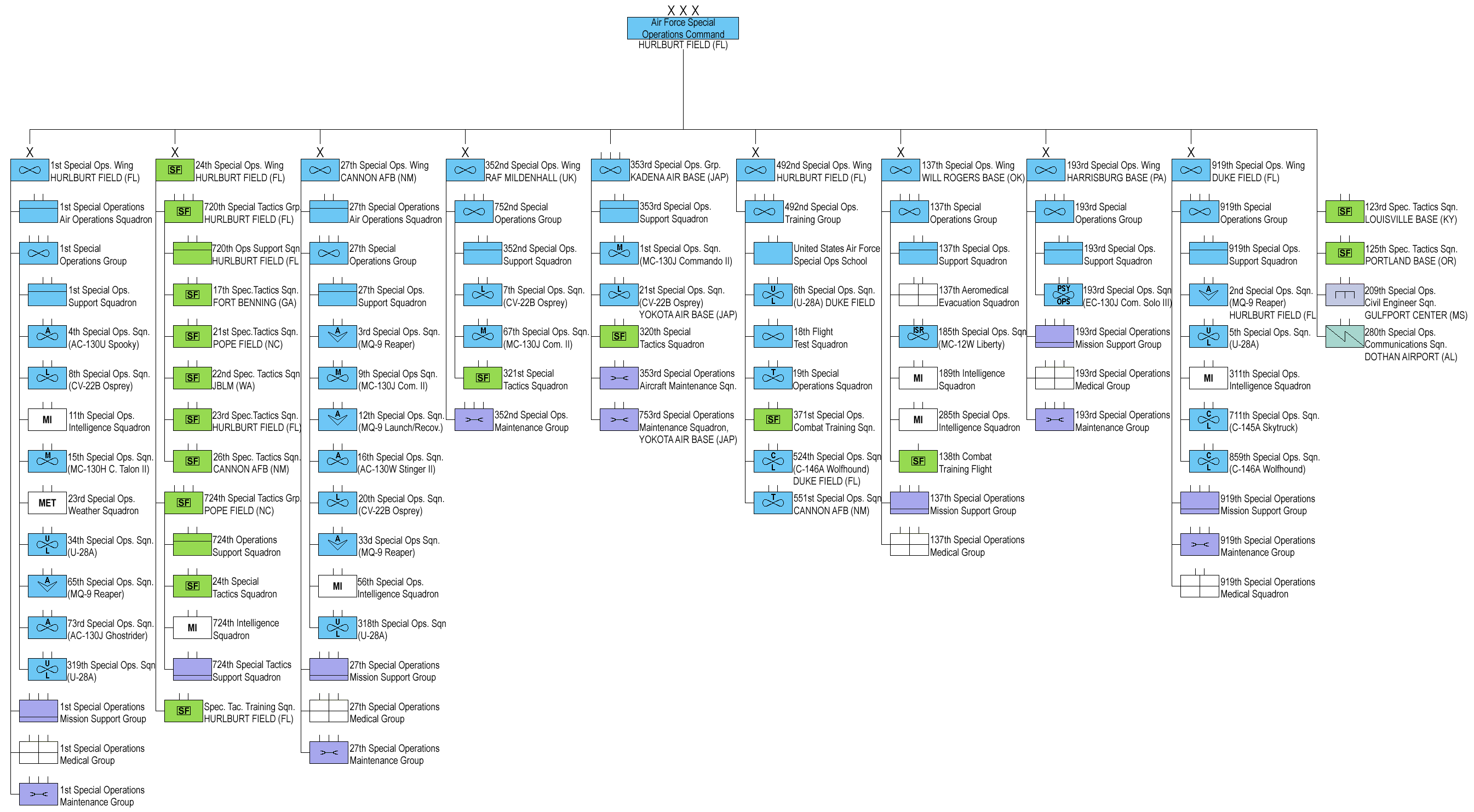
Air Force Special Operations Command OrBat

== Units ==
=== Air Force ===
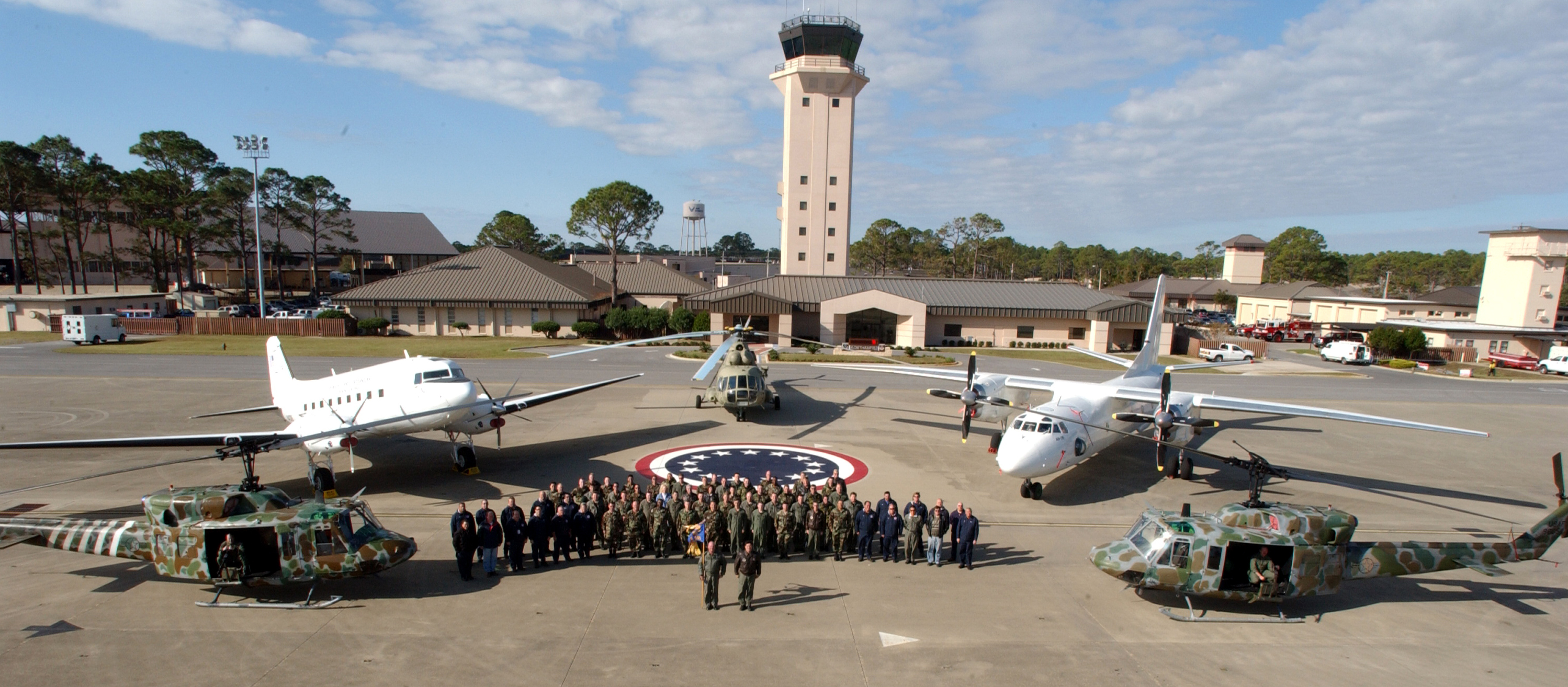
Several U.S. and Russian-built aircraft of the Air Force Special Operations Air Warfare Center belonging to the 6th Special Operations Squadron

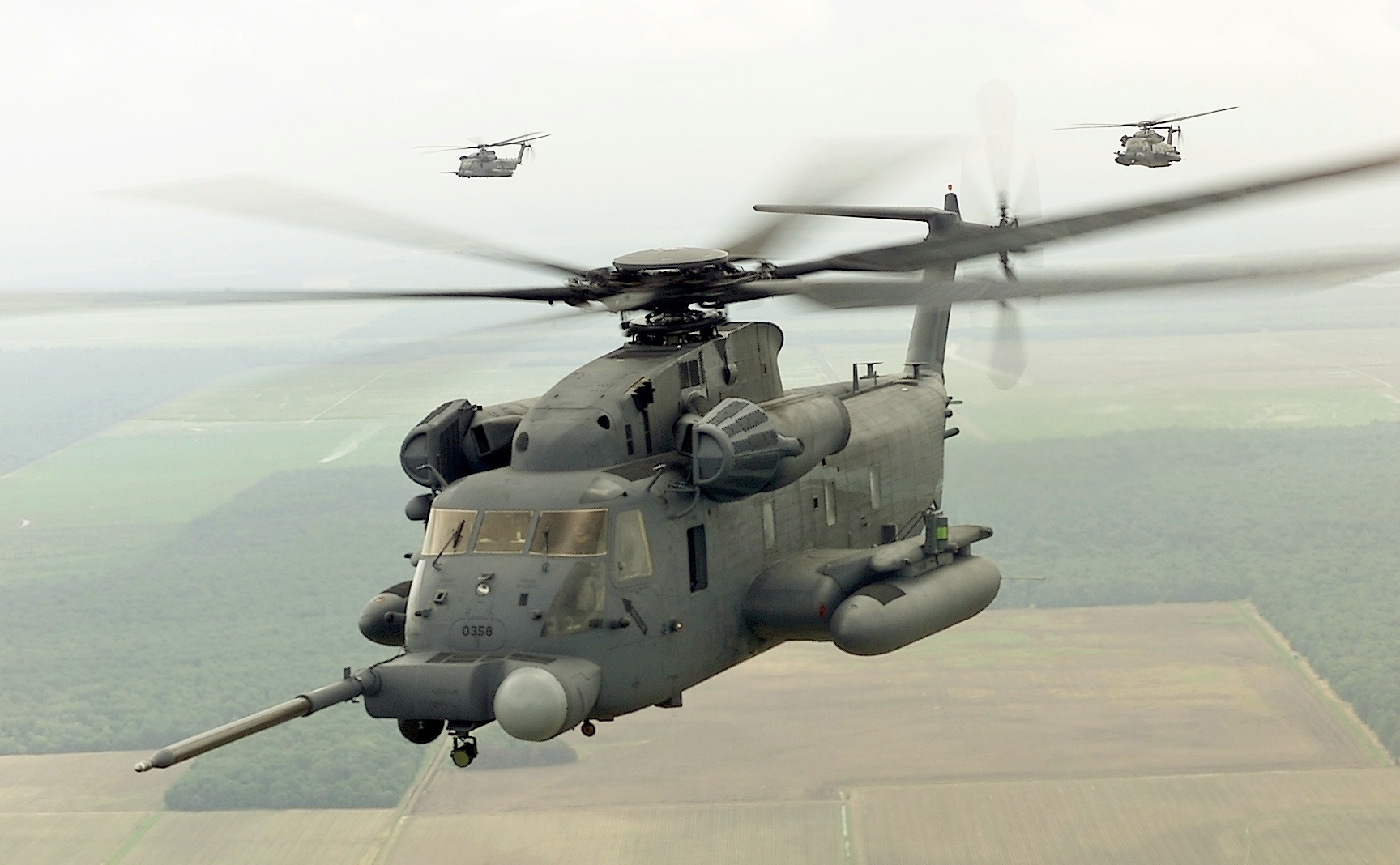
MH-53J Pave Low III helicopters near Hurlburt Field, circa 2001; upgraded to MH-53M Pave Low IV configuration, the last examples were retired from AFSOC service in late 2008 and replaced by the CV-22B Osprey

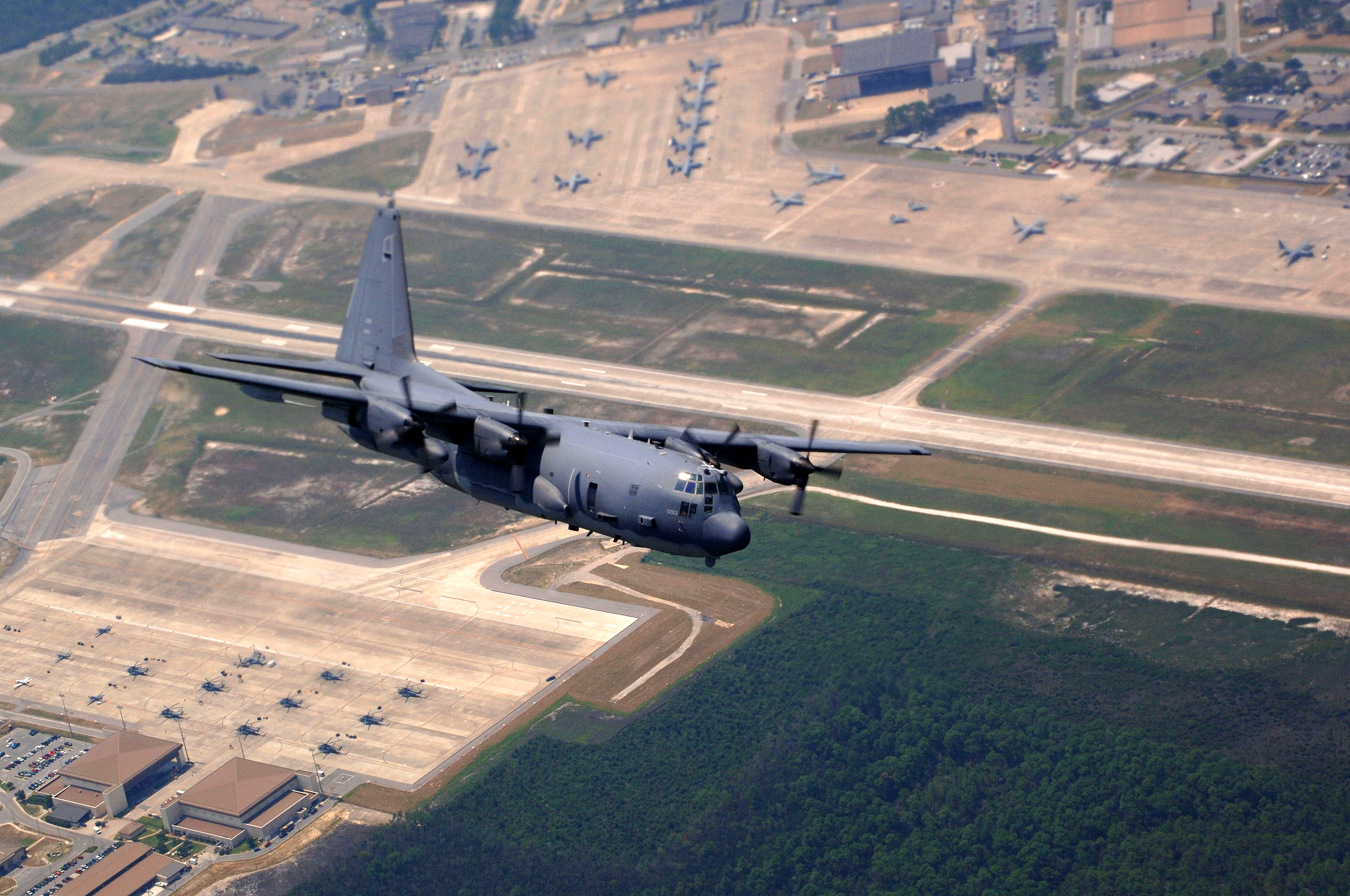
AC-130U Spooky gunship over Hurlburt Field

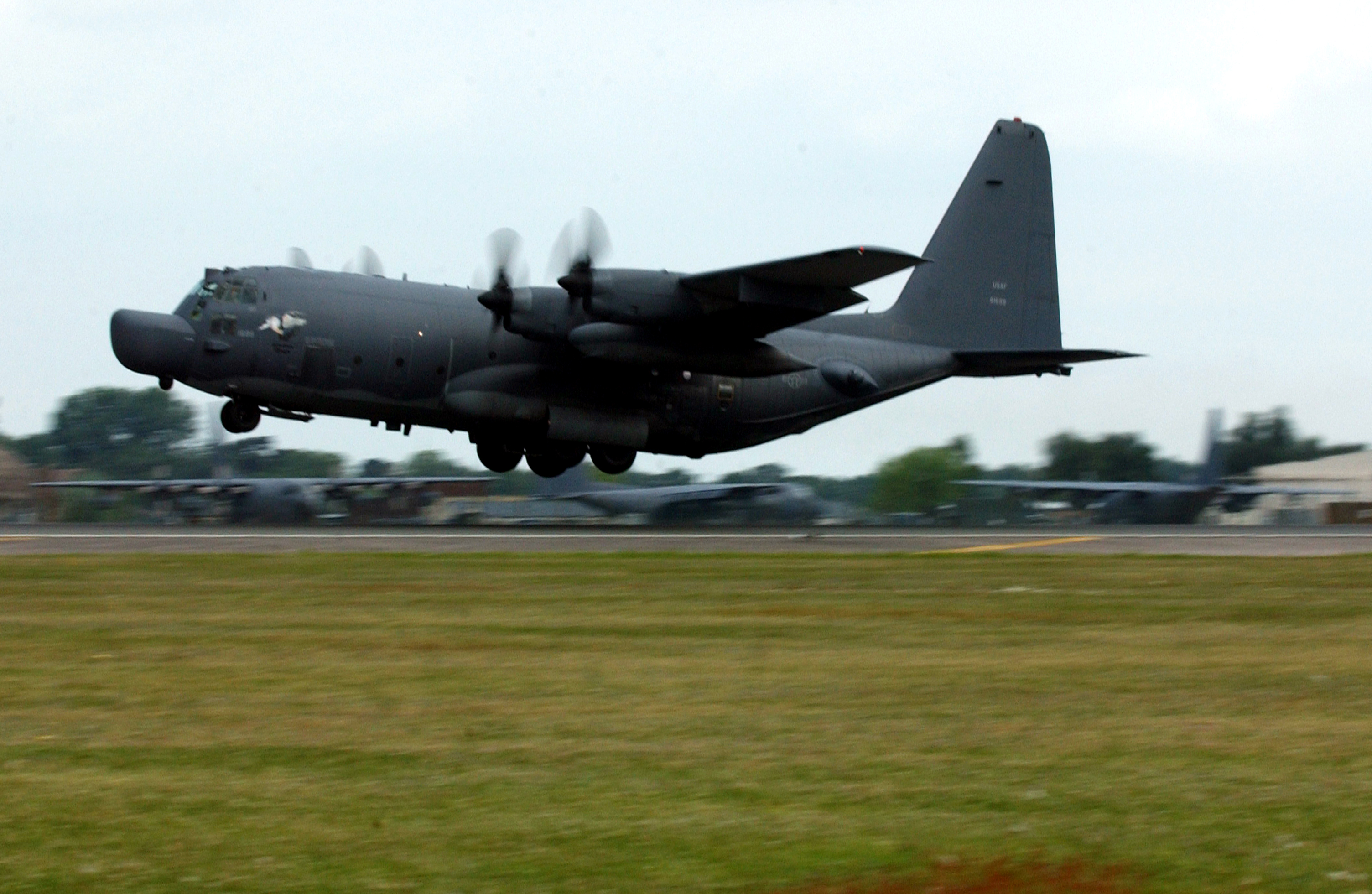
MC-130H Combat Talon II infiltration/exfiltration and aerial refueling aircraft

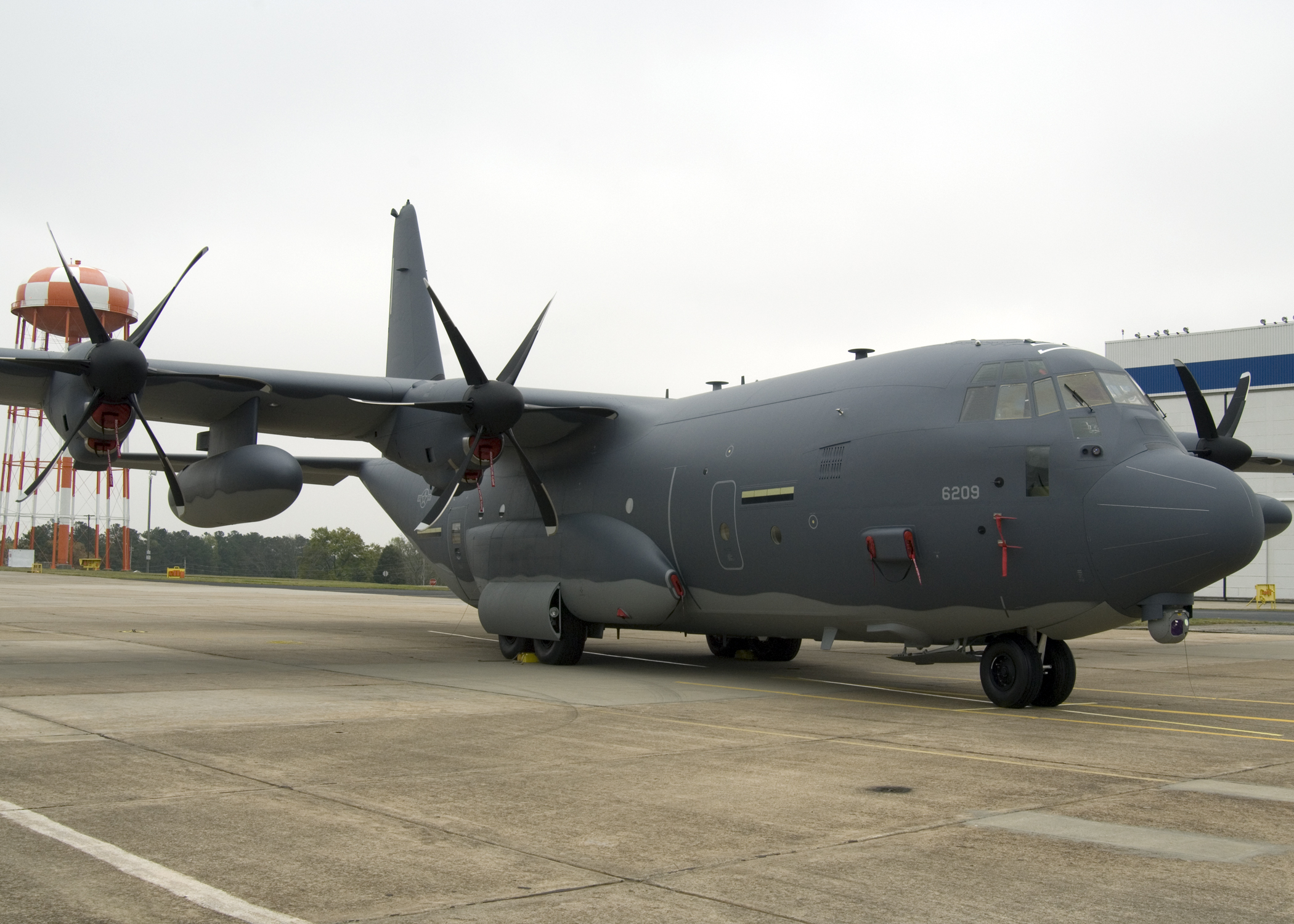
MC-130J Commando II aircraft on the tarmac at the Lockheed Martin / Air Force Plant 6 facility at Dobbins ARB, Georgia

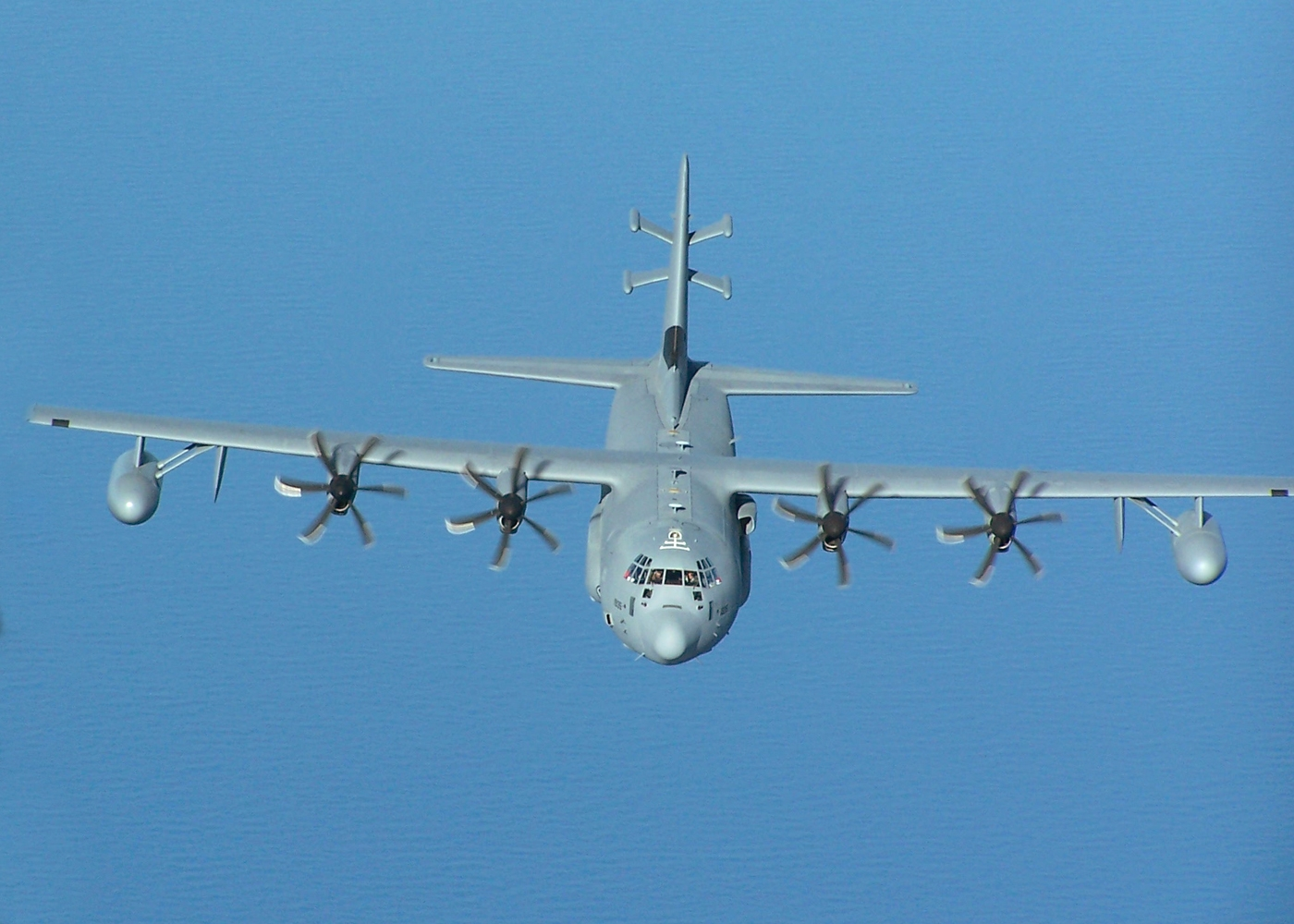
EC-130J Commando Solo III psychological warfare/information warfare aircraft

The following list contains the flying and Special Tactics squadrons of the Air Force Special Operations Command:

- 1st Special Operations Wing, Hurlburt Field, Florida
  - 1st Special Operations Group
    - 4th Special Operations Squadron, AC-130J Ghostrider
    - 8th Special Operations Squadron, CV-22B Osprey
    - 15th Special Operations Squadron, MC-130J Commando II
    - 34th Special Operations Squadron, U-28A
    - 65th Special Operations Squadron, MQ-9 Reaper
    - 73rd Special Operations Squadron, AC-130J Ghostrider
    - 319th Special Operations Squadron, U-28A
- 24th Special Operations Wing, Hurlburt Field, Florida
  - Special Tactics Training Squadron, Hurlburt Field, Florida
  - 720th Special Tactics Group, Hurlburt Field, Florida
    - 21st Special Tactics Squadron, Pope Field, North Carolina
    - 22nd Special Tactics Squadron, Joint Base Lewis-McChord, Washington
    - 23rd Special Tactics Squadron, Hurlburt Field, Florida
    - 26th Special Tactics Squadron, Cannon AFB, New Mexico
  - 724th Special Tactics Group, Pope Field, North Carolina
    - 17th Special Tactics Squadron, Fort Benning, Georgia
    - 24th Special Tactics Squadron, Pope Field, North Carolina
- 27th Special Operations Wing, Cannon AFB, New Mexico
  - 27th Special Operations Group
    - 3rd Special Operations Squadron, MQ-9 Reaper
    - 9th Special Operations Squadron, MC-130J Commando II
    - 12th Special Operations Squadron, MQ-9 Reaper
    - 16th Special Operations Squadron, AC-130J Ghostrider
    - 20th Special Operations Squadron, CV-22B Osprey
    - 33rd Special Operations Squadron, MQ-9 Reaper
    - 310th Special Operations Squadron, U-28A
    - 318th Special Operations Squadron, U-28A
- 352d Special Operations Wing, RAF Mildenhall, UK
  - 752d Special Operations Group
    - 7th Special Operations Squadron, CV-22B Osprey
    - 67th Special Operations Squadron, C-146A Wolfhound
    - 321st Special Tactics Squadron
- 353d Special Operations Wing, Kadena Air Base, Japan
  - 1st Special Operations Squadron, MC-130J Commando II
  - 21st Special Operations Squadron, CV-22B Osprey, Yokota Air Base
  - 320th Special Tactics Squadron
- 492d Special Operations Wing, Hurlburt Field, Florida
  - 492d Special Operations Training Group
    - United States Air Force Special Operations School
    - 5th Special Operations Squadron, U-28A
    - 6th Special Operations Squadron, MC-130J Commando II, Cannon AFB
    - 17th Special Operations Squadron, OA-1K Skyraider II, Will Rogers Air National Guard Base
    - 18th Special Operations Test and Evaluation Squadron
    - 19th Special Operations Squadron, training AC-130J, and MC-130J crews
    - 371st Special Operations Combat Training Squadron, ground training
    - 524th Special Operations Squadron, C-146A Wolfhound, Duke Field

=== Air National Guard ===
- 137th Special Operations Wing, Oklahoma Air National Guard, Will Rogers Air National Guard Base, Oklahoma
  - 137th Special Operations Group
    - 185th Special Operations Squadron, MC-12W Liberty
    - 138th Combat Training Flight, ground training
- 193d Special Operations Wing, Pennsylvania Air National Guard, Harrisburg Air National Guard Base, Pennsylvania
  - 193d Special Operations Group
    - 193d Special Operations Squadron, MC-130J Commando II

Additionally, the Air Force Special Operations Command would gain the following units from Air Mobility Command or Air Combat Command aligned Air National Guard wings:

- 427th Special Operations Squadron, CASA/IPTN CN-235
- 123rd Special Tactics Squadron, Kentucky Air National Guard, Louisville Air National Guard Base, Kentucky
- 125th Special Tactics Squadron, Oregon Air National Guard, Portland Air National Guard Base, Oregon
- 150th Special Operations Squadron, New Jersey Air National Guard, New Jersey
- 209th Special Operations Civil Engineer Squadron, Mississippi Air National Guard, Gulfport Combat Readiness Training Center, Mississippi
- 280th Special Operations Communications Squadron, Alabama Air National Guard, Dothan Regional Airport, Alabama

=== Air Force Reserve Command ===
The Air Force Reserve Command units of Air Force Special Operations Command are:

- 919th Special Operations Wing, Duke Field, Florida
  - 919th Special Operations Group
    - 2nd Special Operations Squadron, MQ-9 Reaper, Hurlburt Field
    - 711th Special Operations Squadron, AC-130J Ghostrider, Hurlburt Field
    - 859th Special Operations Squadron, C-146A Wolfhound

== Personnel and resources ==
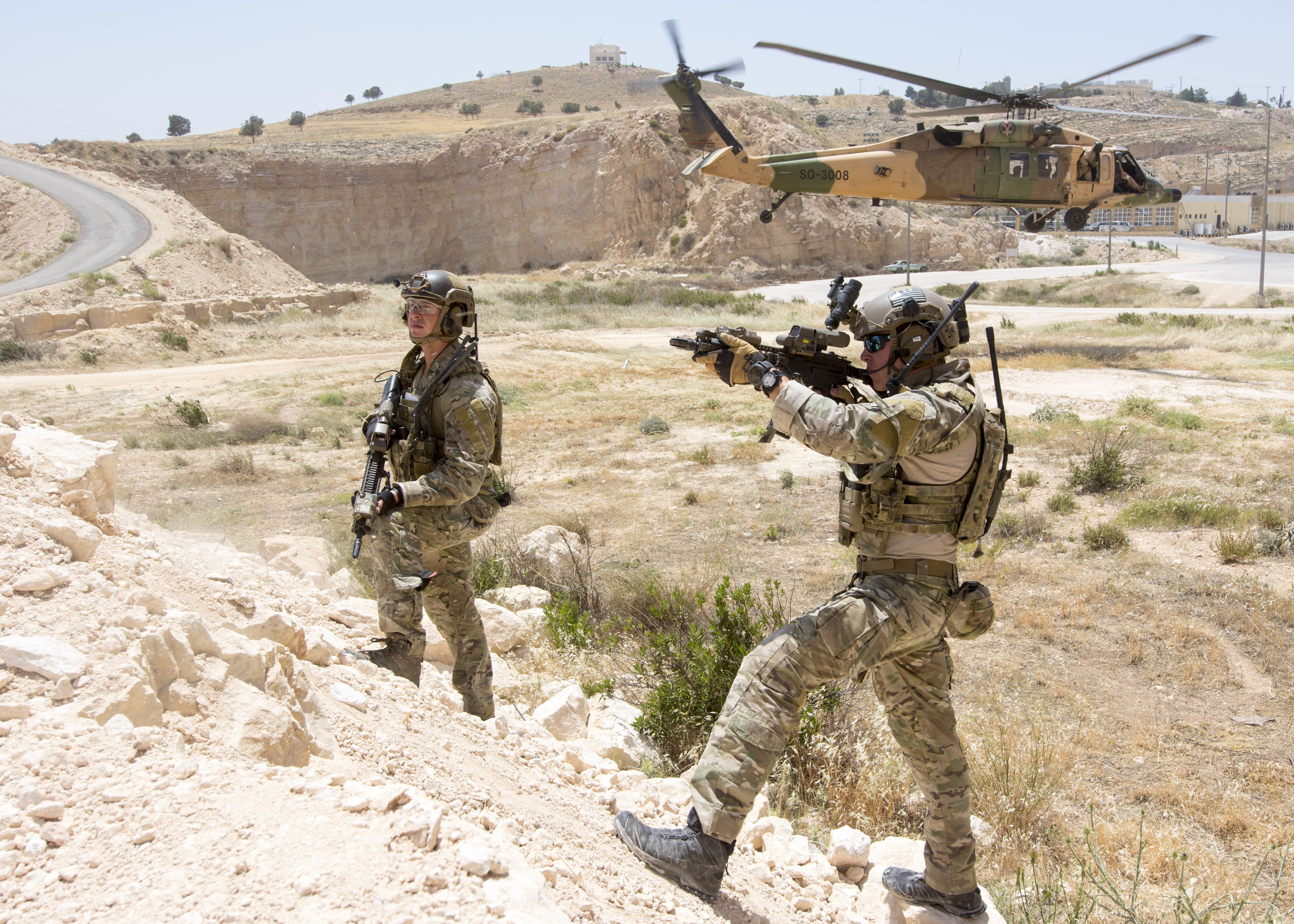
Air Force Special Tactics Commandos training in Jordan

AFSOC has about 20,800 active-duty, Air Force Reserve, Air National Guard and civilian personnel.

The command's SOF units are composed of highly trained, rapidly deployable airmen who are equipped with specialized aircraft. These forces conduct missions ranging from precision application of firepower, to infiltration, aviation foreign internal defense, exfiltration, resupply and aerial refueling of SOF operational elements.

In addition to the pilots, combat systems officers, and enlisted aircrew who fly AFSOC's aircraft, there is a support force of maintenance officers and enlisted aircraft maintenance personnel who maintain aircraft and their support systems, a cadre of premier intelligence officers and enlisted intelligence specialists taught special operations, as well as logisticians, security forces and numerous other support officers and personnel.

Another aspect of AFSOC is Special Tactics, the U.S. Air Force's special operations ground force. Similar in ability and employment to Marine Special Operations Command (MARSOC), U.S. Army Special Forces and U.S. Navy SEALs, Air Force Special Tactics personnel are typically the first to enter combat and often find themselves deep behind enemy lines in demanding, austere conditions, usually with little or no support.

The command's Special Tactics Squadrons are led by Special Tactics Officers (STOs). Special Tactics Squadrons combine Combat Controllers (CCT), Tactical Air Control Party (TACP), Air Force Special Reconnaissance (SR), Pararescuemen (PJs) and Combat Rescue Officers (CROs) to form versatile SOF teams. AFSOC's unique capabilities include airborne radio and television broadcast for psychological operations, as well as combat aviation advisors to provide other governments military expertise for their internal development.

Due to the rigors of the career field, Special Tactics' year-long training is one of the most demanding in the military, with attrition rates between 80 and 90 percent. In an attempt to reduce the high attrition, Special Tactics is very selective when choosing their officers. Special Tactics Officers (STO) undergo a highly competitive process to gain entry into the Special Tactics career field, ensuring only the most suitable leaders are selected. STO leadership and role modeling during the difficult training reduces the attrition rate for enlisted trainees.

STO selection is a two-phase process. Beginning with Phase One, a board of veteran STOs reviews application packages consisting of letters of recommendation, fitness test scores, and narratives written by the applicants describing their career aspirations and reasons for applying. Based on Phase One performance, about eight to 10 applicants are invited to the next phase. Phase Two is a weeklong battery of evaluations, ranging from physical fitness and leadership to emotional intelligence and personality indicators. At the end of Phase Two, typically two to four applicants are selected to begin the year-plus Special Tactics training pipeline.

== Aircraft ==
=== Current ===
AFSOC regularly operates the following aircraft:

- AC-130J Ghostrider
- MC-130J Commando II
- CV-22B Osprey
- C-32B
- C-146A Wolfhound
- U-28A Draco
- MQ-9 Reaper
- RQ-11 Raven
- Scan Eagle
- Wasp III
- De Havilland Canada Dash 8 (modified)
- Airbus C295W

Additionally, AFSOC, through the 492nd Special Operations Wing (as of 2017, and the Air Force Special Operations Air Warfare Center previously), possess and operates a small number of the following aircraft for its special training mission and Aviation Foreign Internal Defense (FID) missions:

- C-130E Hercules
- An-26 Curl
- C-47T Sky Train
- C-212 Aviocar
- CN-235-100
- Mi-17 Hip
- UH-1H and UH-1N Huey

== History ==
=== Twenty-Third Air Force (23 AF) ===
In December 1982, the Air Force transferred responsibility for Air Force special operations from Tactical Air Command (TAC) to Military Airlift Command (MAC). Consequently, in March 1983, MAC activated Twenty-Third Air Force (23 AF) at Scott Air Force Base, Illinois. This new numbered air force's responsibilities included worldwide missions of special operations, combat rescue, weather reconnaissance and aerial sampling, security support for intercontinental ballistic missile sites, training of USAF helicopter and HC-130 crewmen, pararescue training, and medical evacuation.

==== Operation Urgent Fury ====
In October 1983, 23 AF helped rescue Americans from the island nation of Grenada. During the seven-day operation, centered at Point Salines Airport, 23 AF furnished MC-130s, AC-130s, aircrews, maintenance, and support personnel. An EC-130 from the 193rd Special Operations Wing of the Air National Guard (ANG) also played a psy-war role. Lieutenant Colonel (later Major General) James L. Hobson Jr., an MC-130 pilot and commander of the 8th Special Operations Squadron, was later awarded the Mackay Trophy for his actions in leading the air drop on the Point Salines Airport.

==== U.S. Special Operations Command ====
In May 1986, the Goldwater-Nichols Department of Defense Reorganization Act led to the formation of the United States Special Operations Command. Senators William Cohen and Sam Nunn introduced the Senate bill, and the following month Congressman Dan Daniel introduced a like measure in the House of Representatives. The key provisions of the legislation formed the basis to amend the 1986 Defense Authorizations Bill. This bill, signed into law in October 1986, in part directed the formation of a unified command responsible for special operations. In April 1987, the DoD established the United States Special Operations Command (USSOCOM) at MacDill Air Force Base, Florida, and Army GEN James J. Lindsay assumed command. Four months later, 23 AF moved its headquarters from Scott AFB to Hurlburt Field, Florida.

In August 1989, Gen Duane H. Cassidy, USAF, CINCMAC, divested 23 AF of its non-special operations units, e.g., search and rescue, weather reconnaissance, etc. Thus, 23 AF served a dual role: still reporting to MAC, but also functioning as the air component to USSOCOM.

==== Operation Just Cause ====
From late December 1989 to early January 1990, 23 AF participated in the invasion of the Republic of Panama during Operation Just Cause. Special operations aircraft included both active duty AC-130H and Air Force Reserve AC-130A Spectre gunships, EC-130 Volant Solo psychological operations aircraft from the Air National Guard, HC-130P/N Combat Shadow tankers, MC-130E Combat Talons, and MH-53J Pave Low and MH-60G Pave Hawk helicopters. Special tactics Combat Controllers and Pararescuemen provided important support to combat units.

Spectre gunship crews of the 1 SOW earned the Mackay Trophy and Tunner Award for their efforts, with an Air Force Reserve AC-130A Spectre crew from the 919th Special Operations Group (919 SOG) earning the President's Award. An active duty 1st SOW MC-130 Combat Talon crew ferried the captured Panamanian President, Manuel Noriega, to prison in the United States. Likewise, the efforts of the 1 SOW maintenance people earned them the Daedalian Award.

On 22 May 1990, General Larry D. Welch, USAF, the Chief of Staff of the Air Force, redesignated Twenty-Third Air Force as Air Force Special Operations Command (AFSOC). This new major command consisted of three wings: the 1st, 39th and 353rd Special Operations Wings as well as the 1720th Special Tactics Group (1720 STG), the U.S. Air Force Special Operations School, and the Special Missions Operational Test and Evaluation Center.

Currently, after major redesignations and reorganizations, AFSOC direct reporting units include the 16th Special Operations Wing, the 352nd Special Operations Group, the 353rd Special Operations Group, the 720th Special Tactics Group (720 STG), the USAF Special Operations School and the 18th Flight Test Squadron (18 FLTS). During the early 1990s a major reorganization occurred within AFSOC. The 1720 STG became the 720 STG in March 1992; the transfer of ownership of Hurlburt Field from Air Mobility Command (AMC, and formerly MAC) to AFSOC in October 1992, followed by the merger of the 834th Air Base Wing (834 ABW) into the 1 SOW, which assumed host unit responsibilities. A year later the 1 SOW became the 16 SOW in a move to preserve Air Force heritage.

Meanwhile, the Special Missions Operational Test and Evaluation Center (SMOTEC), which explored heavy lift frontiers in special operations capabilities, while pursuing better equipment and tactics development, was also reorganized. In April 1994, the Air Force, in an effort to standardize these types of organizations, redesignated SMOTEC as the 18th Flight Test Squadron (18 FLTS).

==== Gulf War ====
From early August 1990 to late February 1991, AFSOC participated in Operation Desert Shield and Operation Desert Storm, the protection of Saudi Arabia and liberation of Kuwait. Special tactics personnel operated throughout the theater on multiple combat control and combat rescue missions. Special operations forces performed direct action missions, combat search and rescue, infiltration, exfiltration, air base ground defense, air interdiction, special reconnaissance, close air support, psychological operations, and helicopter air refuelings. Pave Low crews led the helicopter assault on radars to blind Iraq at the onset of hostilities, and they also accomplished the deepest rescue for which they received the Mackay Trophy.

MC-130E/H Combat Talons dropped the BLU-82, the largest conventional bombs of the war and, along with MC-130P Combat Shadows, dropped the most psychological warfare leaflets, while AC-130A and AC-130H Spectre gunships provided valuable fire support and armed reconnaissance. However, the AC-130 community also suffered the single greatest combat loss of coalition air forces with the shoot down of an AC-130H, call sign Spirit 03, by an Iraqi SA-7 Grail surface-to-air missile. All fourteen crew members aboard Spirit 03 were killed.

=== AFSOC ===
==== Post-Gulf War ====
In December 1992, AFSOC special tactics and intelligence personnel supported Operation Restore Hope in Somalia. In late 1994, AFSOC units spearheaded Operation Uphold Democracy in Haiti, and in 1995 Operation Deliberate Force in the Balkans.

==== Operation Enduring Freedom ====
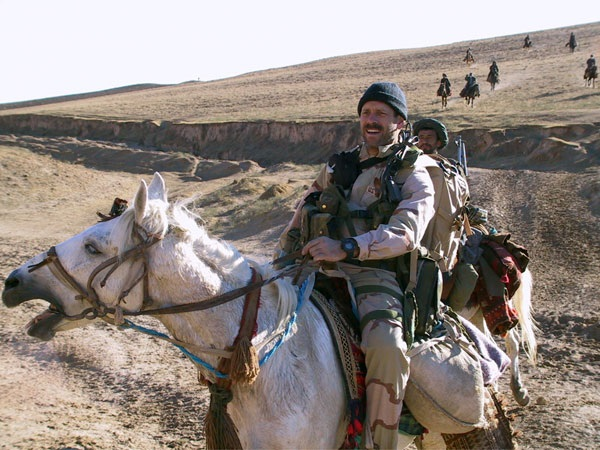
Then-MSgt Bart Decker from the 23rd STS, on horseback in the Balkh valley, during the initial days of the U.S. invasion of Afghanistan in 2001.

The terrorist attacks on the World Trade Center in New York City, and the Pentagon, Washington D.C., on 11 September 2001 brought U.S. special operations forces to the forefront of the war against terrorism. By the end of September 2001, AFSOC deployed forces to Central Asia for Operation Enduring Freedom – Afghanistan to help destroy the al Qaeda terrorist organization and remove the Taliban regime in Afghanistan. AFSOC aircraft delivered special tactics forces to the battle ground and they in turn focused U.S. airpower and allowed Northern Alliance ground forces to dispatch the Taliban and al Qaeda from Afghanistan. AFSOC personnel also deployed to the Philippines to help aid that country's efforts against terrorism.

US Air Force Special Operations had a long-term presence in the Philippines during Operation Enduring Freedom – Philippines.

==== Operation Iraqi Freedom ====
In March 2003, AFSOC again deployed forces to the Middle East, this time in support of what would become Operation Iraqi Freedom – the removal of Saddam Hussein and his Baathist government. The command's personnel and aircraft teamed with SOF and conventional forces to quickly bring down Saddam Hussein's government by May 2003. AFSOC forces continued to conduct operations in support of the new Iraqi government against insurgents and terrorists.

==== Interoperability and Multinational trainings ====
The USAFSOC takes part in the multinational trainings at the King Abdullah II Special Operations Training Centre in which it trains in multiple scenarios with partner nations in order to increase interoperability between partner forces.

== Commanders ==
| No. | Commander | | Term | | |
| No. | Portrait | Name | Took office | Left office | Duration |
|---|---|---|---|---|---|
| 1 | Thomas E. Eggers | Major General; Thomas E. Eggers | 22 May 1990 | 20 June 1991 | 1 year, 29 days |
| 2 | Bruce L. Fister | Major General; Bruce L. Fister | 21 June 1991 | 21 July 1994 | 3 years, 30 days |
| 3 | James L. Hobson Jr. | Major General; James L. Hobson Jr. | 22 July 1994 | 8 July 1997 | 2 years, 351 days |
| 4 | Charles R. Holland | Major General; Charles R. Holland | 9 July 1997 | 4 August 1999 | 2 years, 26 days |
| 5 | Maxwell C. Bailey | Lieutenant General; Maxwell C. Bailey | 5 August 1999 | 15 January 2002 | 2 years, 163 days |
| 6 | Paul V. Hester | Lieutenant General; Paul V. Hester | 16 January 2002 | 30 June 2004 | 2 years, 166 days |
| 7 | Michael W. Wooley | Lieutenant General; Michael W. Wooley | 1 July 2004 | 26 November 2007 | 3 years, 148 days |
| 8 | Donald C. Wurster | Lieutenant General; Donald C. Wurster | 27 November 2007 | 24 June 2011 | 3 years, 209 days |
| 9 | Eric E. Fiel | Lieutenant General; Eric E. Fiel | 24 June 2011 | 1 July 2014 | 3 years, 7 days |
| 10 | Bradley A. Heithold | Lieutenant General; Bradley A. Heithold | 1 July 2014 | 19 July 2016 | 2 years, 18 days |
| 11 | Marshall B. Webb | Lieutenant General; Marshall B. Webb | 19 July 2016 | 28 June 2019 | 2 years, 344 days |
| 12 | James C. Slife | Lieutenant General; James C. Slife | 28 June 2019 | 9 December 2022 | 3 years, 164 days |
| 13 | Tony D. Bauernfeind | Lieutenant General; Tony D. Bauernfeind | 9 December 2022 | 2 July 2024 | 1 year, 206 days |
| 14 | Michael E. Conley | Lieutenant General; Michael E. Conley | 2 July 2024 | Incumbent | 2 years, 132 days |

== Contingency operations ==
Operations supported by Air Force Special Operations Forces since the Vietnam War.
| Date(s) | Operation |
|---|---|
| 1975 | Mayaguez incident, Cambodia |
| 1975 | Operation Eagle Pull, Cambodia |
| 1975 | Operation Frequent Wind, Vietnam |
| 1976 | Operation Fluid Drive, Lebanon |
| 1978 | Zaire Airlift |
| 1980 | Operation Eagle Claw, Iran |
| 1981 | Kidnapping of U.S. Army Brigadier General James Dozier, Italy |
| 1981 | Gulf of Sidra incident, Libya |
| 1983 | Operation Urgent Fury, Grenada |
| 1983 | Operation Big Pine, Honduras |
| 1983–1985 | Operation Bat, Bahamas, Turks and Caicos |
| 1983–1988 | Operation Bield Kirk, Operation Blue Flame, Operation Blinking Light, El Salvador |
| 1984 | Salvadorean President José Napoleón Duarte's daughter kidnapping, El Salvador |
| 1985 | TWA Flight 847 plane hijacking, Algeria/Lebanon |
| 1985 | Achille Lauro hijacking, Mediterranean Sea |
| 1986 | Operation El Dorado Canyon, Libya |
| 1986 | Pan Am Flight 73 plane hijacking, Pakistan |
| 1987–1988 | Operation Earnest Will, Operation Prime Chance, Persian Gulf |
| 1988 | Operation Golden Pheasant, Honduras |
| 1989 | Operation Safe Passage, Afghanistan |
| 1989 | Operation Poplar Tree, El Salvador |
| 1989 | 1989 Philippine coup attempt, Philippines |
| 1989 | Operation Just Cause, Panama |
| 1990 | Operation Promote Liberty, Panama |
| 1990 | Civilian evacuation, Liberia |
| 1990–1991 | Operation Desert Shield, Operation Desert Storm, Saudi Arabia, Kuwait, Iraq |
| 1991 | Operation Eastern Exit, Somalia |
| 1991–2003 | Operation Provide Comfort I–III, Operation Northern Watch, Turkey, Iraq |
| 1991 | Operation Sea Angel, 1991 Bangladesh cyclone relief, Bangladesh |
| 1991 | Operation Fiery Vigil, Philippines |
| 1991 | Operation Desert Calm, Saudi Arabia |
| 1991–2003 | Operation Southern Watch, Kuwait |
| 1992 | Operation Silver Anvil, Sierra Leone |
| 1992–1994 | Operation Provide Promise I–II, Italy, Yugoslavia |
| 1992–1993 | Operation Restore Hope, Somalia |
| 1993 | Operation Gothic Serpent, Somalia |
| 1993–1995 | Operation Continue Hope I–III, Somalia |
| 1993 | Operation Deny Flight, Yugoslavia |
| 1993 | Operation Silver Hope, Ukraine |
| 1994 | Operation Restore Democracy, Operation Uphold Democracy, Haiti |
| 1994 | Operation Support Hope, Rwanda |
| 1995 | Operation United Shield, Somalia |
| 1995–1996 | Operation Deliberate Force, Operation Joint Endeavor, Operation Joint Guard, Italy, Yugoslavia, Bosnia |
| 1996 | Search and Rescue support for U.S. Secretary of Commerce Ron Brown CT-43 crash, Croatia |
| 1996 | Operation Assured Response, evacuation, Liberia |
| 1996 | Operation Guardian Retrieval, Uganda |
| 1996 | Operation Pacific Bridge, Palau |
| 1996 | Operation Guardian Assistance, Rwanda |
| 1997 | Operation Silver Wake, evacuation, Albania |
| 1997 | Operation Guardian Angel, Yugoslavia |
| 1997 | Operation Firm Response, evacuation, Republic of Congo |
| 1997 | Operation High Flight, Namibia |
| 1998 | Operation Desert Thunder, Persian Gulf |
| 1998 | Operation Desert Fox, Iraq |
| 1999 | Operation Allied Force, Serbia, Kosovo |
| 2000 | Operation Atlas Response, flood relief, Mozambique |
| 2000 | Operation Fiery Relief, volcano relief, Philippines |
| 2001 | Operation Valiant Return, China |
| 2001–2014 | War in Afghanistan (2001-2021) |
| 2002 | Operation Autumn Return, evacuation, Côte d'Ivoire |
| 2003 | Operation Shining Express, evacuation, Liberia |
| 2003–2011 | Operation Iraqi Freedom, Iraq |
| 2003–2008 | Operation Willing Spirit, Colombia |
| 2004 | Operation Atlas Shield, Greece |
| 2004 | Operation Secure Tomorrow, Haiti |
| 2005–2005 | Operation Unified Assistance, Indian Ocean, Southeast Asia |
| 2005 | Task Force Katrina, hurricane relief, United States |
| 2006 | evacuation, Lebanon |
| 2008 | Operation Aster Silver, evacuation, Chad |
| 2008 | Operation Assured Delivery, Georgia |
| 2008 | Operation Olympic Titan, Pacific Ocean |
| 2010 | Operation Unified Response, earthquake relief, Haiti |
| 2011 | Operation Tomodachi, earthquake and tsunami relief, Japan |
| 2011 | Operation Odyssey Dawn, Libya |
| 2013 | Operation Damayan, typhoon relief, Philippines |
| 2014 | Operation Inherent Resolve, Iraq, Syria, and Libya |
| 2015-2021 | Operation Freedom's Sentinel, Afghanistan |
| 2026 | Operation Absolute Resolve, Venezuela |
| 2026 | Operation Epic Fury, Iran |

== Gallery ==
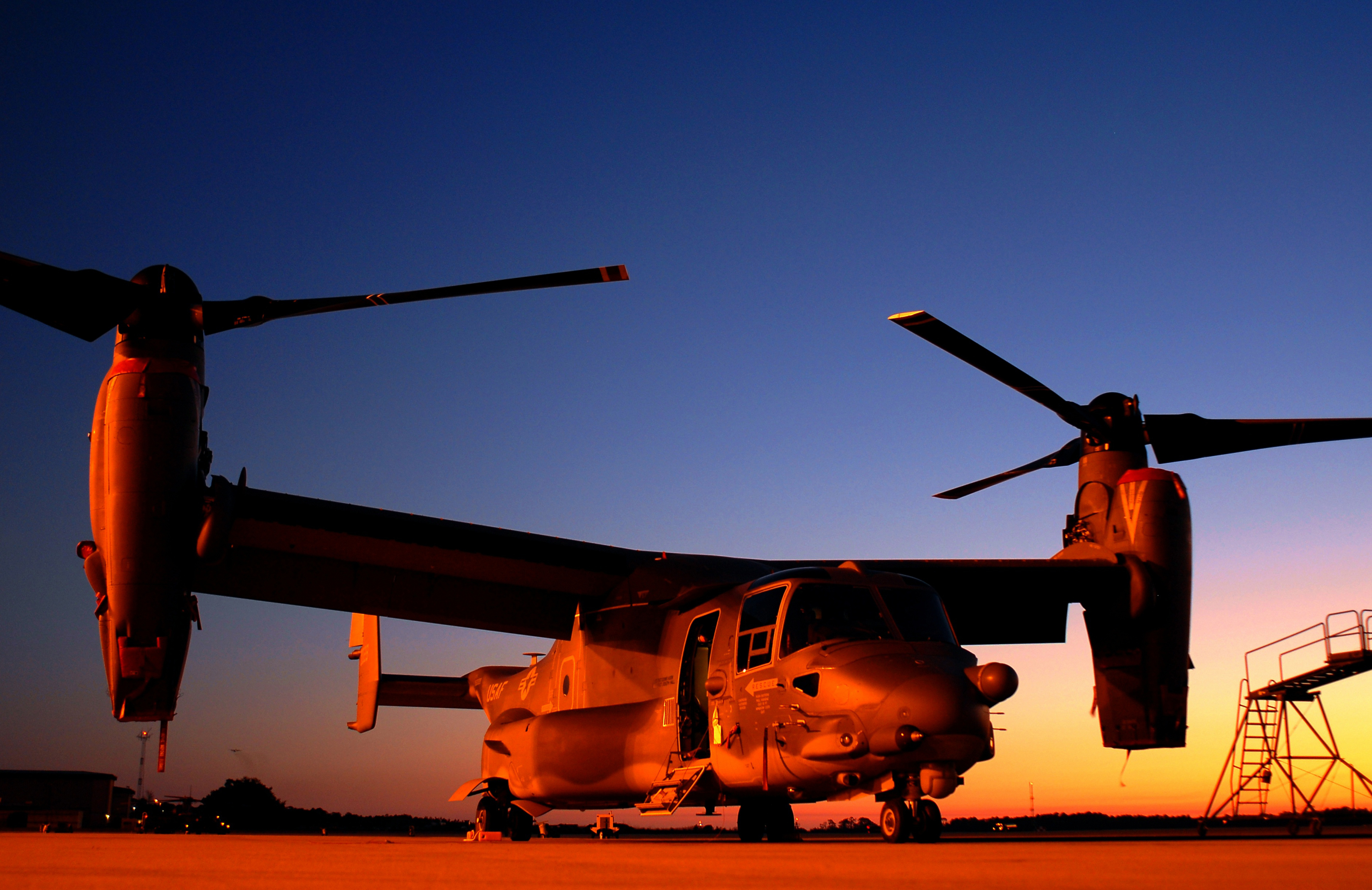
AFSOC's first CV-22B Osprey at sunset, Hurlburt Field, Florida

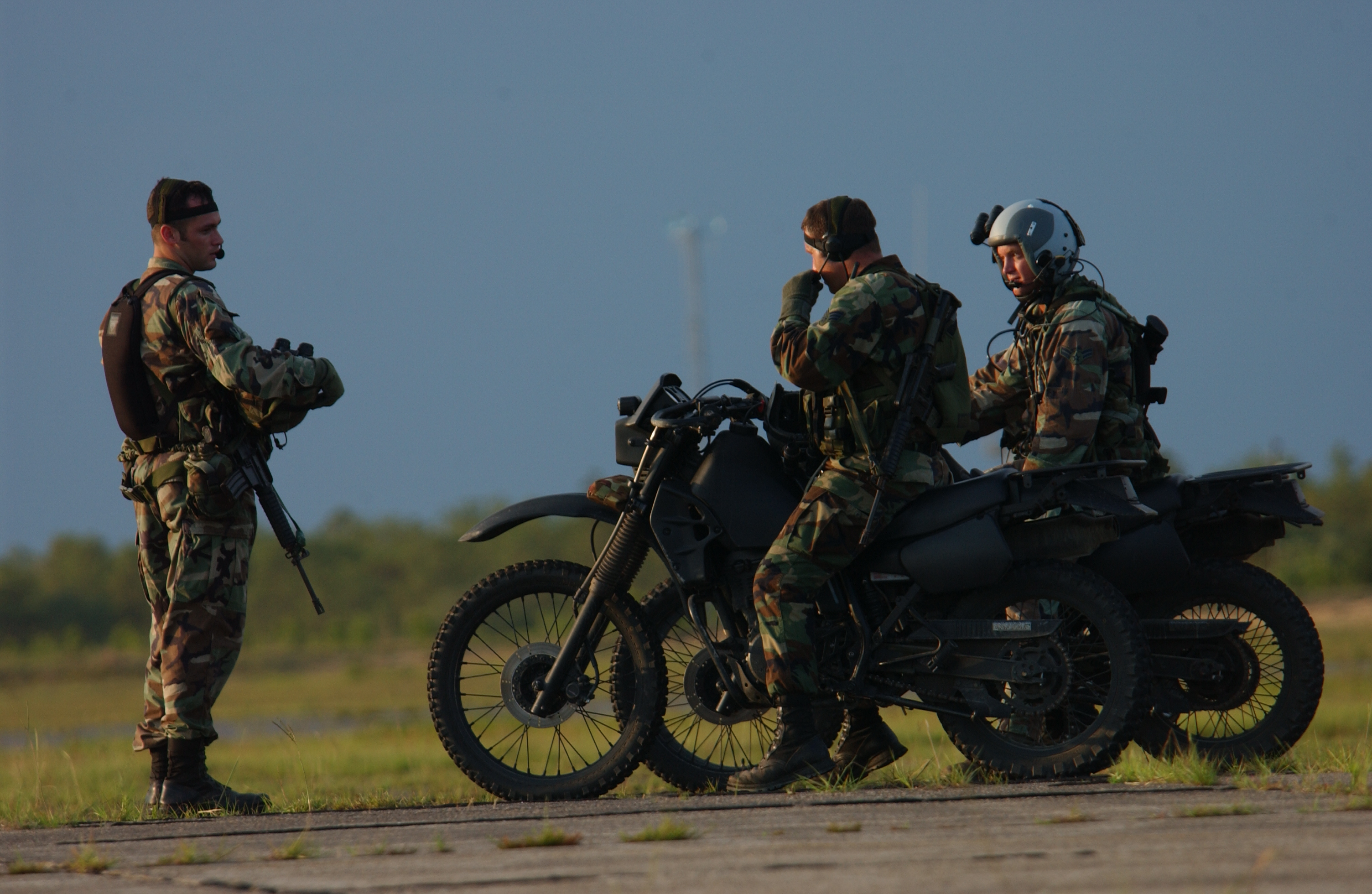
Combat Controllers practice seizing an airfield

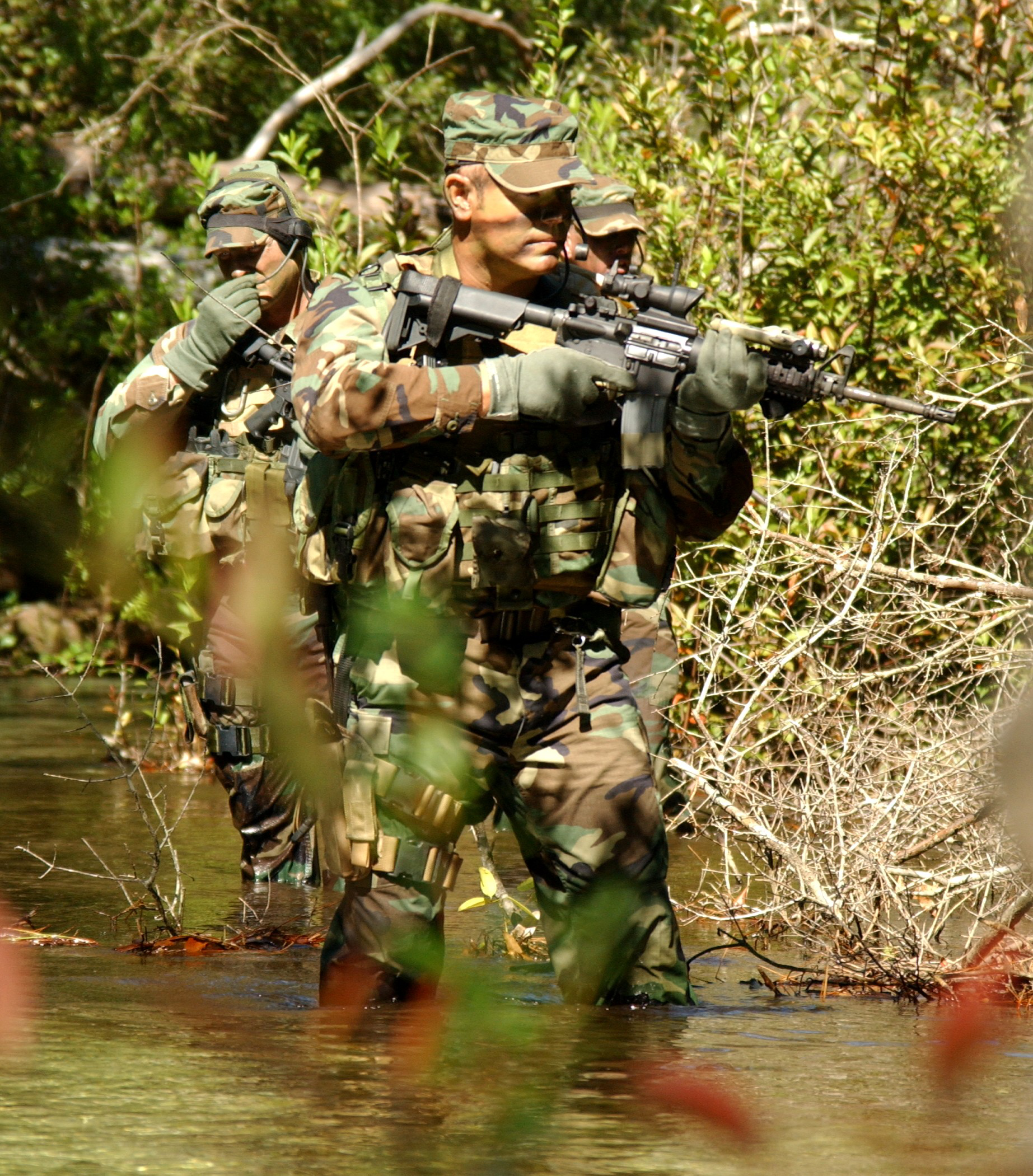
AFSOC Special Operations Weathermen

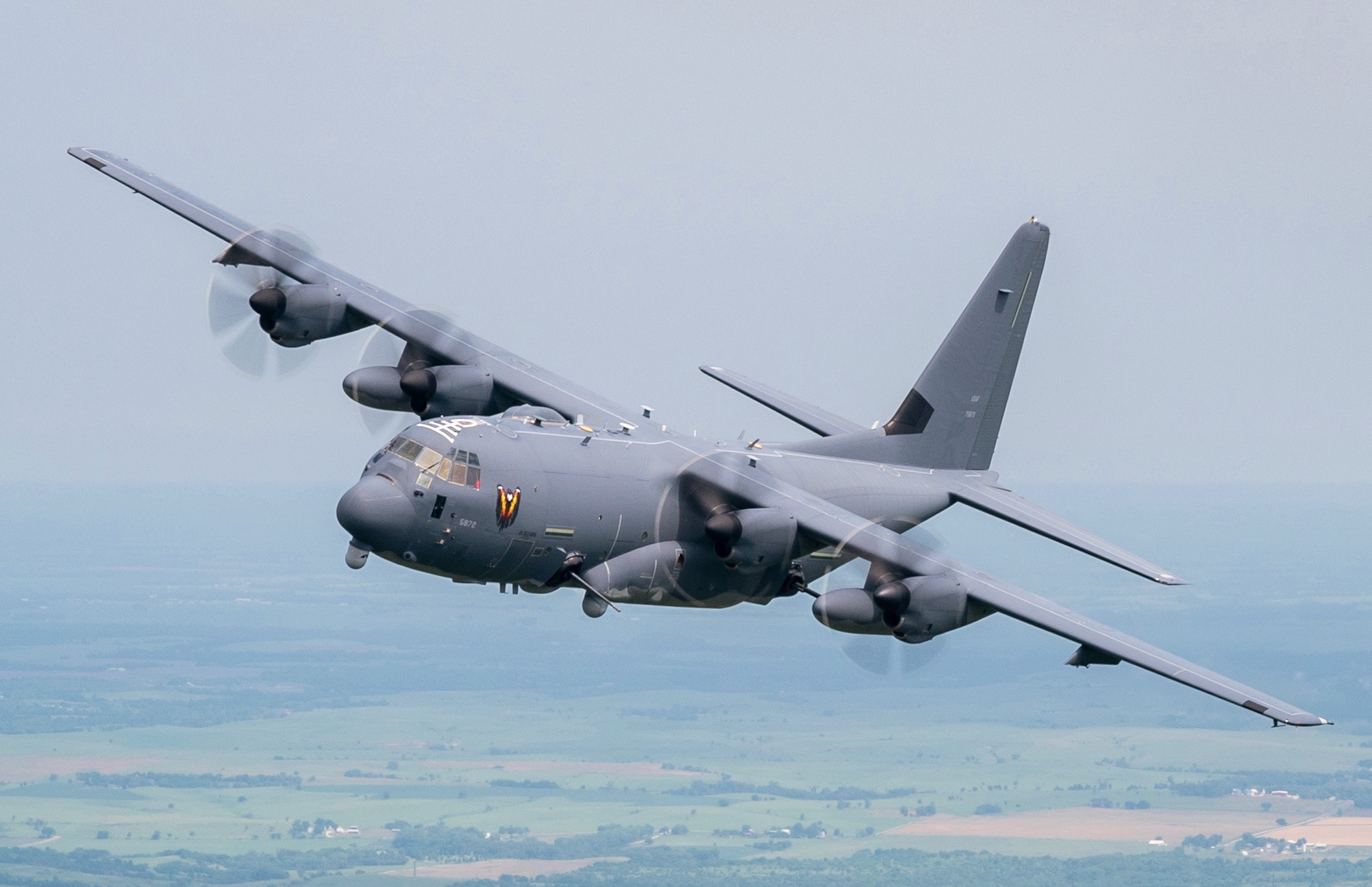
An AC-130J Ghostrider seen near Topeka

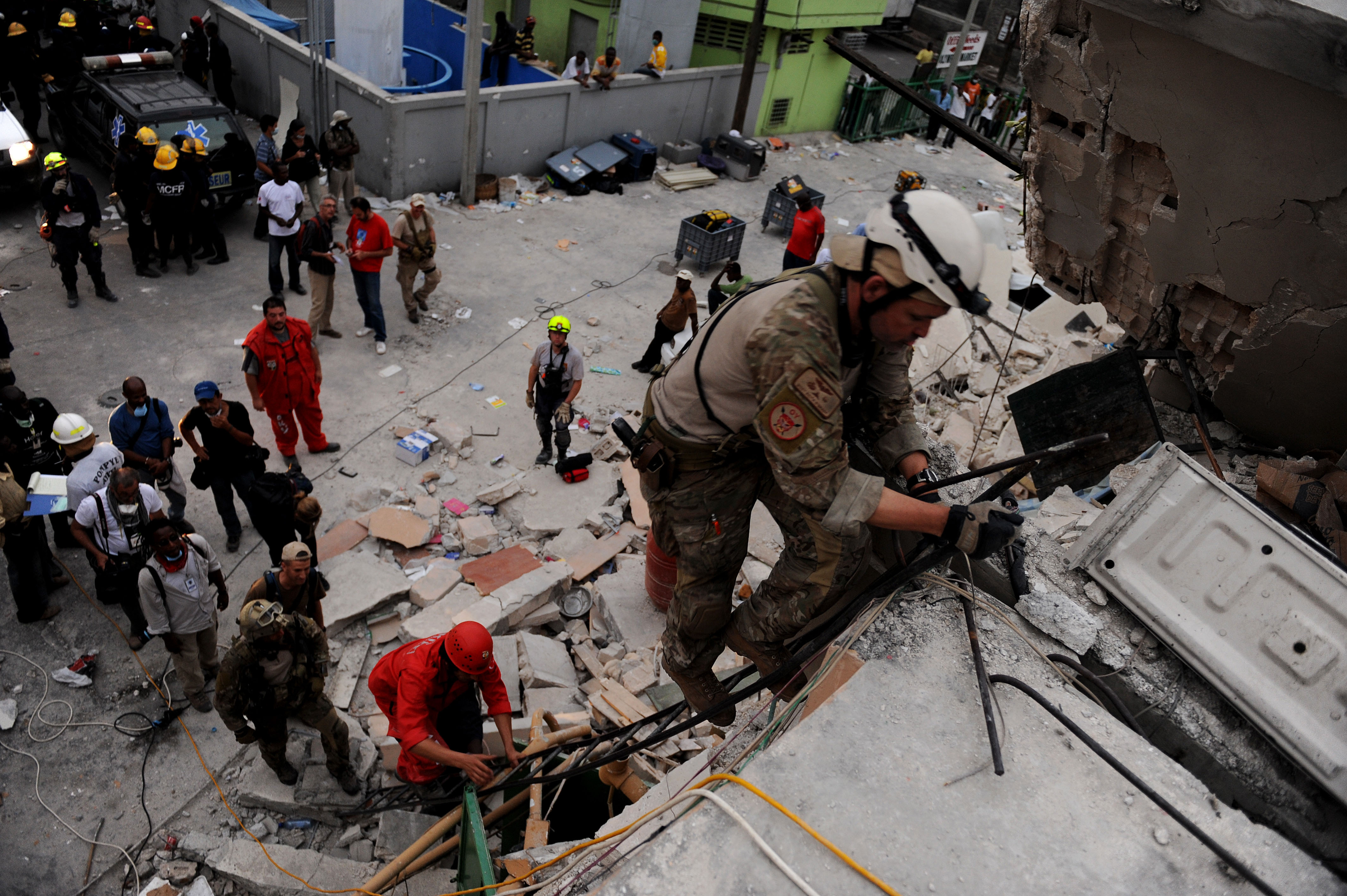
A PJ from the 23rd STS searching for survivors of the 2010 Haiti earthquake in Port-au-Prince

== See also ==
- Ground Mobility Vehicle – (US)SOCOM program
- V-22 Osprey
- Air Resupply And Communications Service
