= Non-combatant evacuation operation =

Operation to evacuate civilians

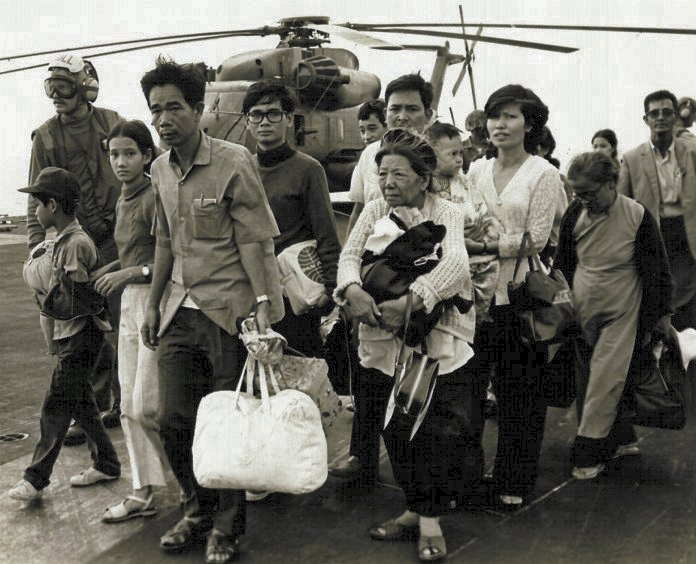
South Vietnamese refugees arrive on a U.S. Navy vessel during Operation Frequent Wind in 1975.

A Non-combatant Evacuation Operation (NEO) is an operation conducted to evacuate civilians from another country, generally due to a deteriorating security situation.

== France ==
- 1940 - Operation Dynamo : France
- 1994 - Operation Amaryllis : Rwanda
- 1994 - Operation Aladin : Yemen
- 1998 - Operation Cohésion : DRC
- 2006 - Operation Baliste : Lebanon
- 2012 - 2014 - Operation Tamour : Jordan and Syria
- 2015 - Operation Mahé : Yemen
- 2021 - Operation Apagan : Afghanistan
- 2023 - Operation Sagittaire : Sudan

== Australia ==
- 2021 - Afghanistan

== China ==
- 2015 - Yemen: (Houthi takeover in Yemen)

== Germany ==
- 1997 - Operation Libelle: Albania
- 2011 - Operation Pegasus (2011): Libya

== Greece ==
- 1993 – Operation Golden Fleece: Abkhazia, Georgia (War in Abkhazia (1992–1993))
- 1997 – Operation Kosmas: Albania (1997 Albanian civil unrest)
- 2006 - Operation Kedros: Lebanon (2006 Lebanon War)
- 2023 - Evacuation from Khartoum: Sudan (Sudanese civil war)
- 2024 - Operation Kosmos: Lebanon (2024 Israeli invasion of Lebanon)

== India ==
- 1990 - 1990 airlift of Indians from Kuwait: Kuwait (Gulf War)
- 2006 - Operation Sukoon: Lebanon (2006 Lebanon War)
- 2011 - Operation Safe Homecoming: Libya (First Libyan Civil War)
- 2015 - Operation Raahat: Yemen
- 2016 - Operation Sankat Mochan: Juba, South Sudan (Battle of Juba)
- 2021 - Operation Devi Shakti: Kabul, Afghanistan (2021 Taliban offensive)
- 2022 - Operation Ganga: Ukraine (2022 Russian invasion of Ukraine)

== Ireland (Republic of) ==
- 2011 - Libya (First Libyan Civil War)
- 2021 - 2021 Kabul airlift

== Israel ==
- 1948-1953 - Operation Goshen: Egypt
- 1949-1950 - Operation Magic Carpet (Yemen): Yemen
- 1951-1952 - Operation Ezra and Nehemiah: Iraq
- 1961 - Operation Mural: Morocco
- 1961-1964 - Operation Yachin: Morocco
- 1984-1985 - Operation Moses: Sudan
- 1985 - Operation Joshua: Sudan
- 1991 - Operation Solomon: Ethiopia

== Pakistan ==
- 2015 - Yemen

== Thailand ==
- 2003 - Operation Pochentong 1: Cambodia (Phnom Penh riots)

== Ukraine ==
- 1993 - Evacuation of Georgian civilians in the mountains of Svaneti: Georgia (War in Abkhazia)
- 1995 - Evacuation of Bosnian civilians in Siege of Žepa: Bosnia and Herzegovina (Bosnian War)
- 2021 - 2021 Kabul airlift

== United Kingdom ==
- 2000 - Operation Palliser: Sierra Leone (Sierra Leone Civil War)
- 2006 - Operation Highbrow: Lebanon (2006 Lebanon War)
- 2021 - Operation Pitting: Kabul, Afghanistan (2021 Taliban offensive)

== United States ==
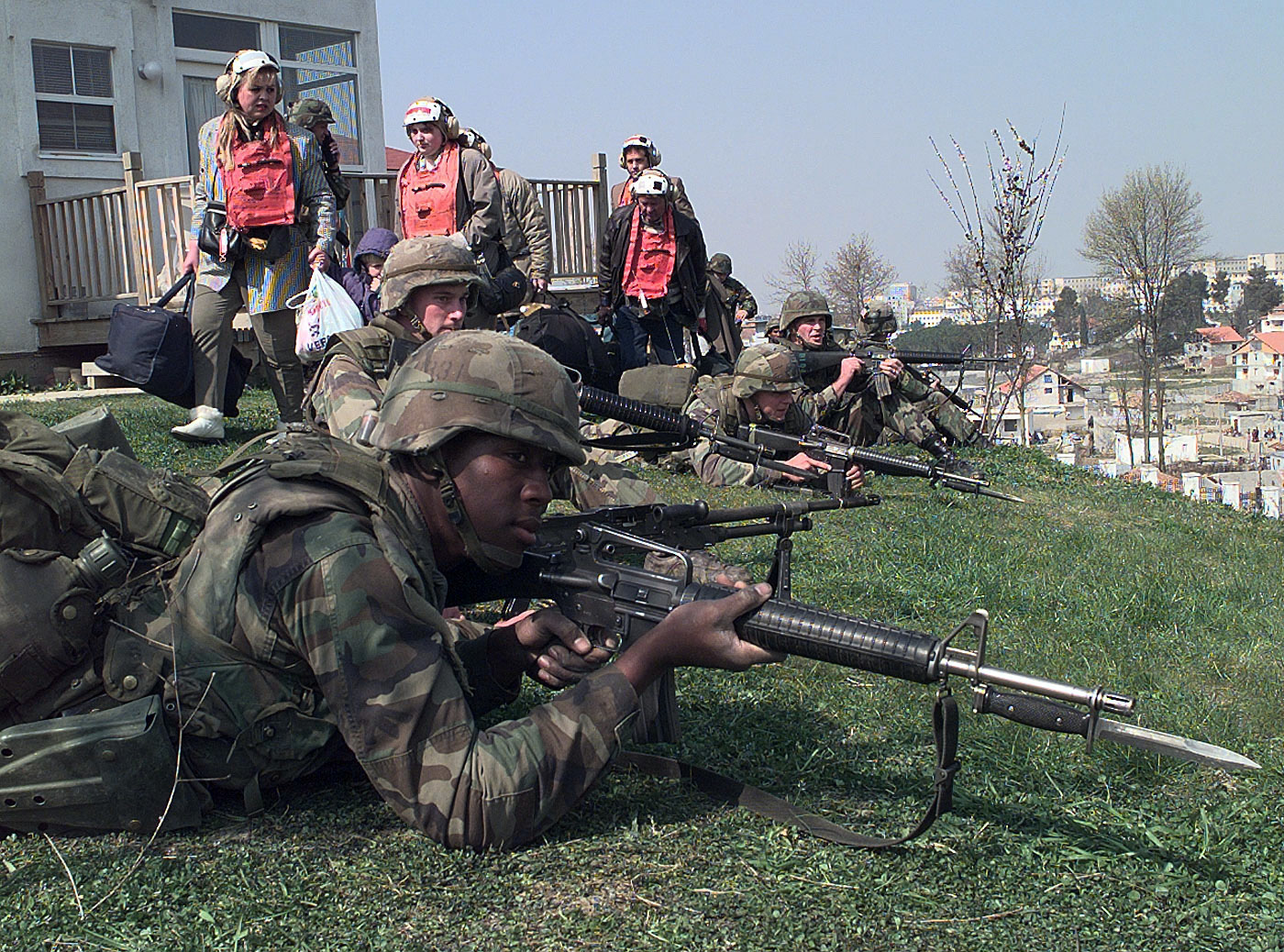
American citizens are boarding a U.S. Marine helicopter in a field inside the U.S. Embassy housing compound in Tirana during Operation Silver Wake, March 1997.

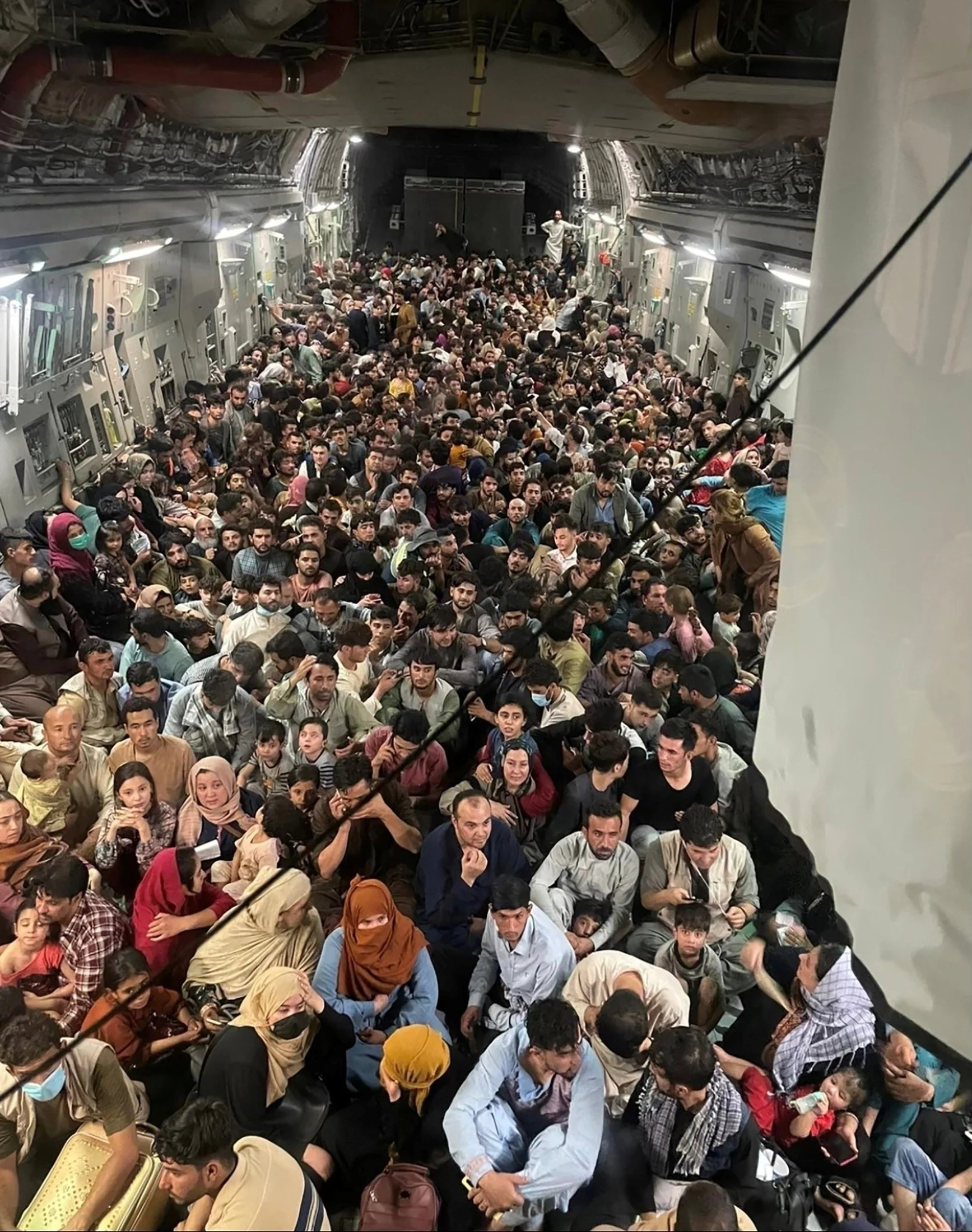
Operation Allies Refuge: Afghans being evacuated on a US Air Force Boeing C-17 plane during the Fall of Kabul in August 2021.

According to United States Military Joint Publication 3-68, Noncombatant Evacuation Operations:

"Noncombatant evacuation operations (NEOs) are conducted to assist the Department of State (DOS) in evacuating noncombatants, nonessential military personnel, selected host-nation citizens, and third country nationals whose lives are in danger from locations in a host foreign nation to an appropriate safe haven and/or the United States.

NEOs usually involve swift insertions of a force, temporary occupation of an objective, and a planned withdrawal upon completion of the mission.

During NEOs, the US Ambassador is the senior authority for the evacuation and is ultimately responsible for the successful completion of the NEO and the safety of the evacuees. The Ambassador speaks with the authority of the President and serves as direct representative on site."

This means that at times American citizens may become endangered in locations outside of the United States. This is usually due to civil unrest or war. However, it may also be due to a natural disaster. The U.S. Ambassador has the responsibility, according to law, to request a NEO. Once he does, the government will determine whether or not the evacuation should be done with civilian resources, such as the Civil Reserve Air Fleet (CRAF), or with military forces. Even if military forces conduct the evacuation, the Ambassador remains in charge of the evacuation.

The method of evacuation could include sealift, airlift, or even by road.

=== Notable operations ===
- 1975 – Operation Frequent Wind: Fall of Saigon, Vietnam War
- 1976 – Operation Fluid Drive: Lebanese Civil War
- 1990 – Operation Sharp Edge: Liberia
- 1991 – Operation Eastern Exit: Somalia
- 1991 – Operation Fiery Vigil: Clark Air Base and U.S. Naval Base Subic Bay, Philippines (1991 eruption of Mount Pinatubo)
- 1992 – Operation Silver Anvil: Sierra Leone
- 1994 – Operation Tiger Rescue: Yemen
- 1994 – Operation Distant Runner: Rwanda
- 1996 – Operation Assured Response: Liberia
- 1996 – Operation Quick Response: Central African Republic
- 1997 – Operation Silver Wake: Albania
- 1997 – Operation Noble Obelisk: Sierra Leone
- 1998 – Operation Safe Departure: Asmara, Eritrea (Eritrean–Ethiopian War)
- 1998 – Operation Shepherd Venture: Bissau, Guinea-Bissau (Guinea-Bissau Civil War)
- 2002 – Operation Shepherd Sentry: Bangui, Central African Republic (political and military unrest leading up to the Central African Republic Bush War)
- 2002 – Operation Autumn Return: Yamoussoukro, Côte d'Ivoire (First Ivorian Civil War)
- 2003 – Operation Shining Express: Monrovia, Liberia (Second Liberian Civil War)
- 2006 – 2006 Lebanon War
- 2010 – Operation Tacit Drift: 2010 Kingston Unrest - Jamaica
- 2011 – Operation Pacific Passage: Tōhoku region, Japan (2011 Tōhoku earthquake and tsunami)
- 2011 – Operation Odyssey Dawn: various locations within Libya: (Libyan Crisis)
- 2014 – Libya
- 2017 - 2017 Dutch St. Maarten NEO after Hurricane Irma
- 2021 - Operation Allies Refuge: Kabul, Afghanistan (2021 Taliban offensive)
- 2023 – Sudan
