= Bradley Heithold =

United States Air Force general

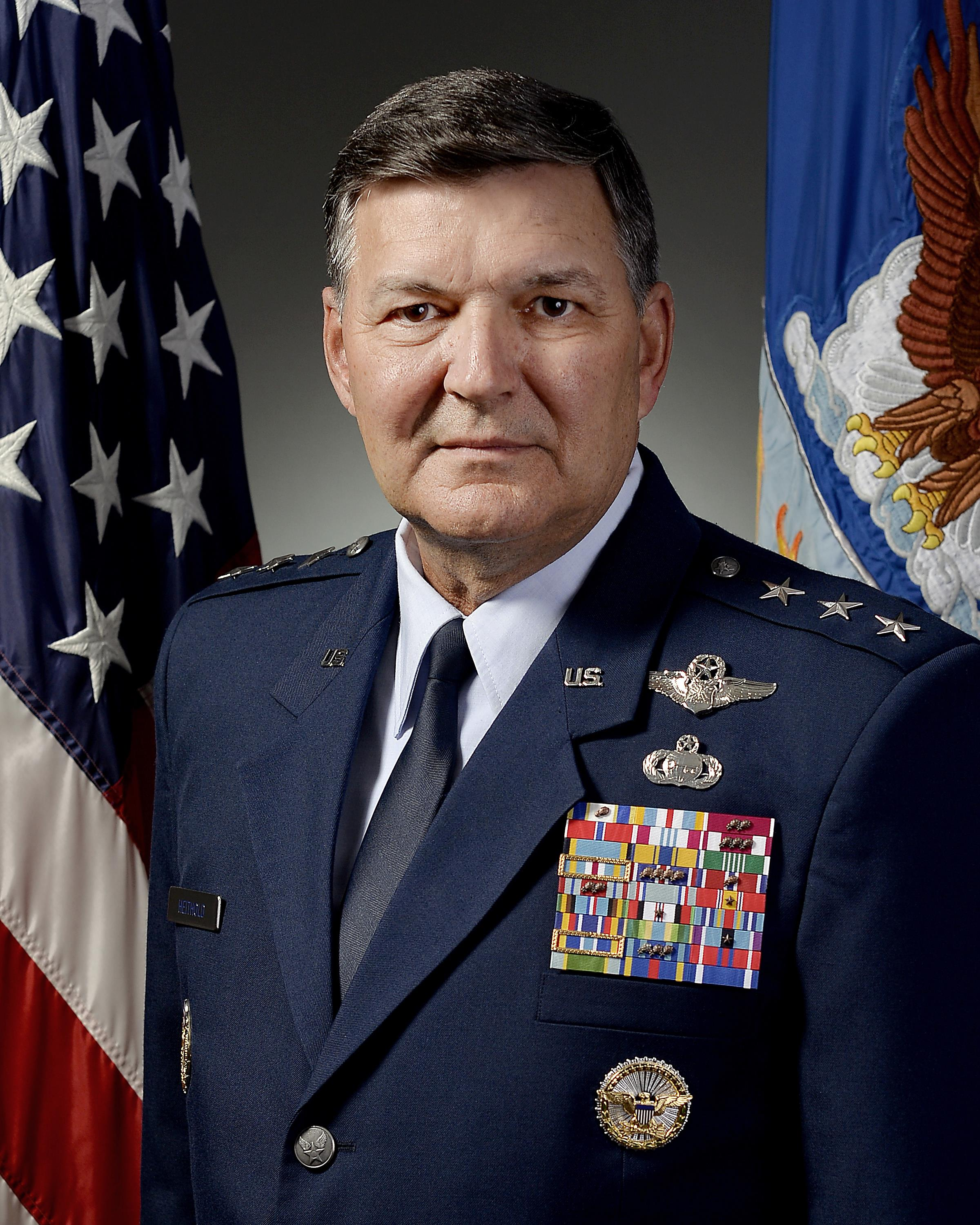
- Lieutenant General Bradley A. Heithold in 2016
- Born: 27 February 1956 (age 70); Lynwood, California, U.S.
- Military career
- Allegiance: United States
- Branch: United States Air Force
- Service years: 1974–2018
- Rank: Lieutenant General
- Commands: Air Force Intelligence, Surveillance and Reconnaissance Agency; 451st Air Expeditionary Group; 347th Rescue Wing; 58th Operations Group; 16th Special Operations Squadron
- Conflicts: War in Afghanistan
- Awards: Defense Distinguished Service Medal; Air Force Distinguished Service Medal (2); Defense Superior Service Medal; Legion of Merit (3); Bronze Star Medal

Lieutenant General Bradley A. Heithold is a retired United States Air Force officer who served as Commander, Air Force Special Operations Command. He also was the Commander of the Air Force Intelligence, Surveillance and Reconnaissance Agency (AFISRA) until July 19, 2011 when he handed command to Major General Robert Otto. Heithold then became Vice Commander, United States Special Operations Command. As AFISRA Commander, Heithold's duties included providing multi-source ISR products, applications, capabilities and resources, as well as information operations forces and expertise.

== Education ==
1981 Bachelor's degree in physics, University of Arkansas, AR
1986 Squadron Officer School, Maxwell AFB, AL.
1991 Master of Public Administration degree, Troy State University, AL.
1995 Air Command and Staff College, Maxwell AFB, AL.
1998 National Defense Fellow, Florida International University, Miami, FL
1999 Armed Forces Staff College, Norfolk, Va.

== Military career ==
Heithold entered the United States Air Force in 1974 and spent three years at Holloman AFB, New Mexico as an F-4D avionics technician. From there, he was commissioned in 1981 as a distinguished graduate of the ROTC program at the University of Arkansas. Heithold has commanded at the squadron, group and wing levels, including the 451st Air Expeditionary Group in Southwest Asia. Staff assignments include positions on the Air Staff and a unified command staff. He was at Air Force Special Operations Command Headquarters, Hurlburt Field, Florida, where he was Director of Plans, Programs, Requirements and Assessments. Heithold is a master navigator with more than 3,400 flight hours in the C-130, AC-130H, MC-130P and HC-130P.

== Awards and decorations ==
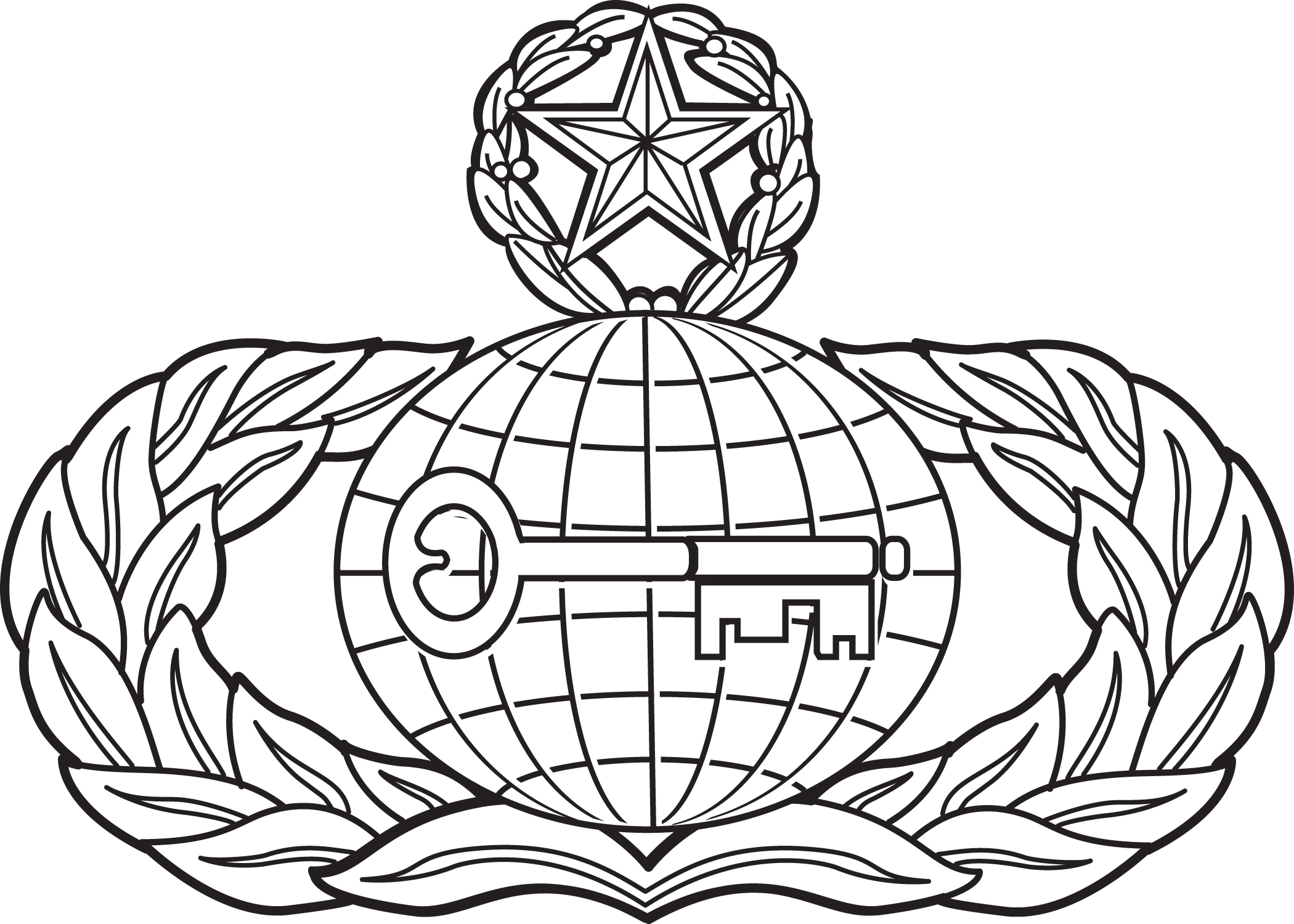
Master Navigator Badge
Master Intelligence Badge
Office of the Secretary of Defense Identification Badge
Headquarters Air Force Badge

Defense Distinguished Service Medal
Air Force Distinguished Service Medal with one bronze oak leaf cluster
Defense Superior Service Medal
Legion of Merit with two oak leaf clusters
Bronze Star Medal
Defense Meritorious Service Medal
Meritorious Service Medal with three bronze oak leaf cluster
Aerial Achievement Medal
Air Force Commendation Medal
Army Commendation Medal
Joint Meritorious Unit Award
Air Force Outstanding Unit Award with four bronze oak leaf clusters
Air Force Organizational Excellence Award with one bronze oak leaf cluster
Combat Readiness Medal with two bronze oak leaf clusters
Air Force Good Conduct Medal
National Defense Service Medal with one bronze service star
Armed Forces Expeditionary Medal
Afghanistan Campaign Medal with one bronze service star
Global War on Terrorism Expeditionary Medal
Global War on Terrorism Service Medal
Armed Forces Service Medal
Humanitarian Service Medal with one bronze service star
Air Force Expeditionary Service Ribbon with gold frame
Air Force Longevity Service Award with one silver and three bronze oak leaf clusters
NCO Professional Military Education Graduate Ribbon
Small Arms Expert Marksmanship Ribbon
Air Force Training Ribbon
NATO Medal for Former Yugoslavia

== Promotions ==
Second Lieutenant May 27, 1981
First Lieutenant Aug. 5, 1983
Captain Aug. 5, 1985
Major May 1, 1993
Lieutenant Colonel Jan. 1, 1997
Colonel April 1, 2000
Brigadier General Sept. 2, 2006
Major General Dec. 9, 2008
Lieutenant General Jul. 19, 2011

Source: Air Force biography
