= 16th Special Operations Squadron =

16th Special Operations Squadron

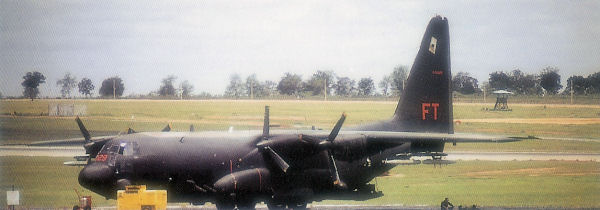
- AC-130A Hercules of the 16th Special Operations Squadron in 1974 (Note: Aircraft is Lockheed AC-130A-LM Hercules serial 55-29 in May 1974. This aircraft survived the Vietnam War and eventually was sent to the Aerospace Maintenance and Regeneration Center on 15 November 1994.)
- Active: 1942–1944; 1944–1945; 1968–present
- Country: United States
- Branch: United States Air Force
- Role: Special operations Close air support
- Part of: Air Force Special Operations Command; 27th Special Operations Group
- Garrison/HQ: Cannon Air Force Base
- Motto: Spectre
- Engagements: World War II; Vietnam War
- Decorations: Presidential Unit Citation (2x) Gallant Unit Citation Air Force Outstanding Unit Award with Combat "V" Device Republic of Vietnam Gallantry Cross with Palm

Insignia
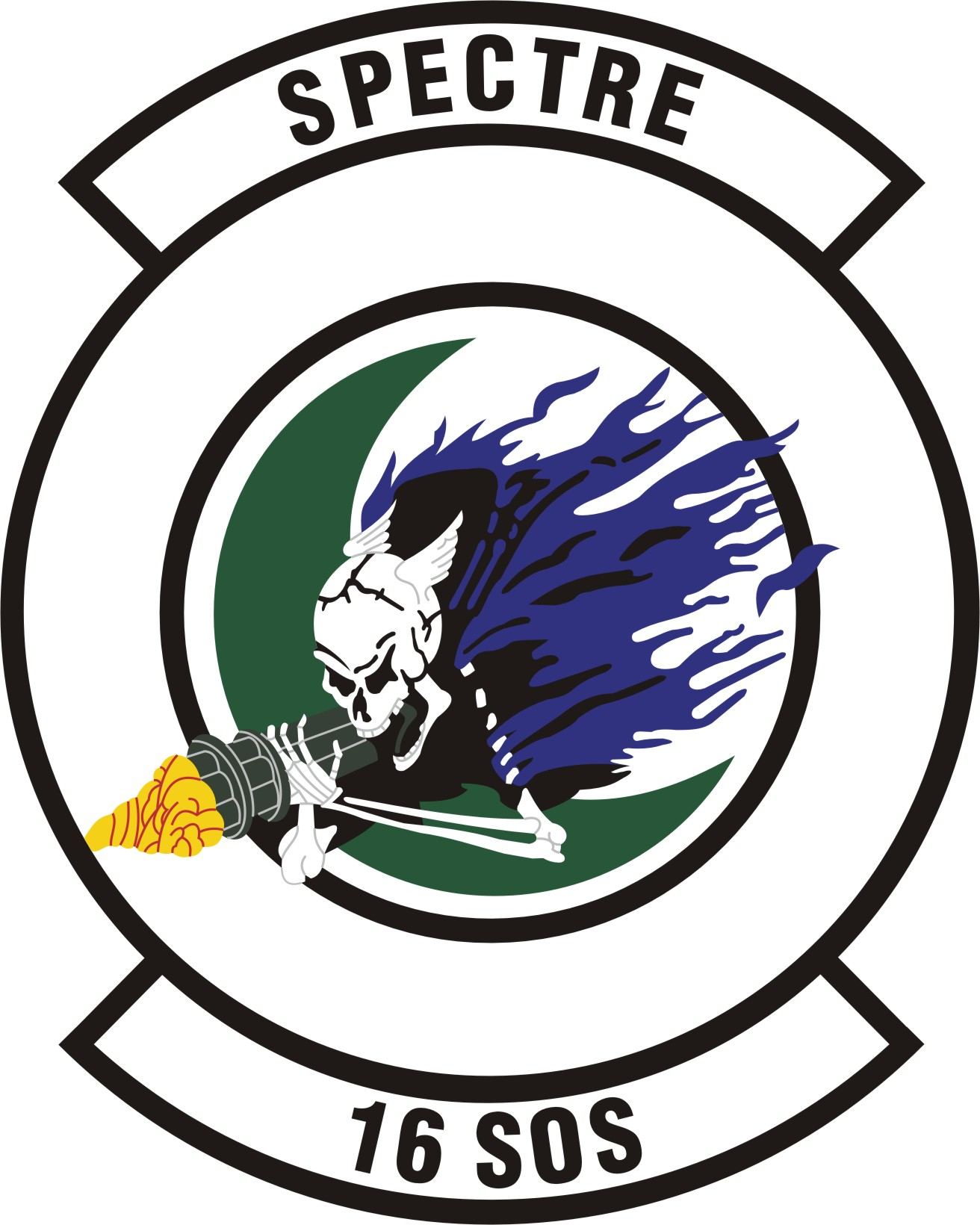
- 16th Special Operations Squadron emblem (Note: Approved 19 December 2007.)

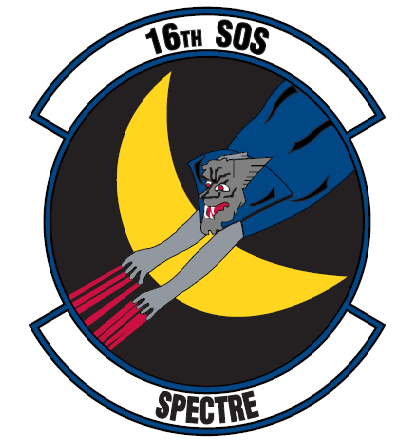
- 16th Special Operations Squadron emblem (Note: Approved 15 November 1994.)

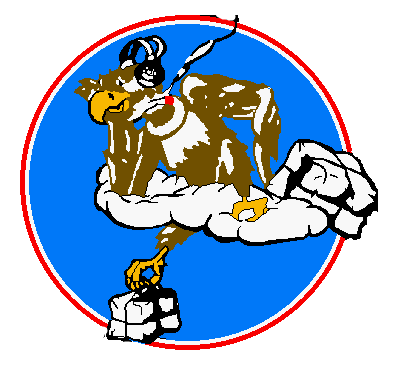
- 16th Combat Cargo Sq emblem (Note: Approved 23 August 1944.)

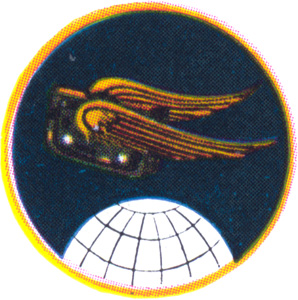
- 16th Ferrying Squadron emblem

The 16th Special Operations Squadron is part of the 27th Special Operations Wing at Cannon Air Force Base, New Mexico. It operates the AC-130J Ghostrider aircraft in support of special operations.

First formed in 1942, the 16th primarily flew cargo transport missions from India into Burma and China, and was disbanded in 1944. It was then reformed in 1968, when it took up its current role and missions under the 1st Special Operations Wing. The 16th remained with the 1st Special Operations Wing throughout its service in Vietnam, and was later reassigned to the 27th Special Operations Group in 1992.

The 16th has been awarded the Presidential Unit Citation, the highest award a U.S. Armed Forces unit can receive for valor in combat, twice in its history, along a Gallant Unit Citation and the Republic of Vietnam's Gallantry Cross.

== Mission ==
Trains and maintains a force to provide firepower in support of conventional and unconventional forces.

== History ==
=== World War II ===
The squadron ferried aircraft from factories to units in US and Canada and conducted pilot training from April 1942 – April 1944. In June 1944 it came under command of the 4th Combat Cargo Group. It flew combat aerial transportation missions from India into Burma and China from December 1944 – October 1945.

=== Vietnam War ===
The 16th flew combat missions in Southeast Asia where it was charged with attacking convoys on the Ho Chi Minh Trail, the defense of hamlets and fire bases, providing close air support to troops in contact with the enemy, providing convoy escort, and battlefield illumination, November 1968 – July 1974. As the war drew to a close the squadron supported Operation Eagle Pull, the evacuation of Phnom Penh, Operation Frequent Wind, the evacuation of Saigon and figured prominently in the rescue of the Mayagüez. 52 members of the 16 SOS were killed in action during the Vietnam War.

=== Hurlburt Field ===
In November 1979 the 16th set a flight endurance record of 29.7 hours, flying non-stop from Hurlburt Field, Florida to Andersen Air Force Base, Guam.

The 16th supported the multi-national assault on Grenada on 25 October 1983. It provided last-second surveillance and intelligence to the air assault forces, silencing anti-aircraft artillery emplacements, knocking out enemy armored personnel carriers, defending political dignitaries surrounded by enemy troops, and relieving troops in combat.

From late December 1989 to 14 January 1990, the squadron participated in the invasion of Panama during Operation Just Cause. 16 SOS aircrews received the MacKay Trophy and the 1989 Military Airlift Command Aircrew of the Year, for their actions in destroying the headquarters for the Panamanian Defense Force, and providing fire support for the Army Ranger assault on Rio Hato Air Base.

On 12 September 1990 The 16th arrived in Saudi Arabia to support Operations Desert Shield and Desert Storm, the protection of Saudi Arabia and the liberation of Kuwait. The squadron flew 50 combat missions in Desert Storm and lost one aircraft and 14 airmen on 31 January 1991, while supporting coalition forces engaged in the Battle of Khafji.

During 1993 and 1994, the 16th deployed to Africa in support of Operation Continue Hope, the United Nations relief effort in Somalia. Squadron crews based out of Djibouti struck targets in Mogadishu, and later deployed to Kenya to ensure security for UN forces. During this deployment, a gunship was destroyed due to an in-bore detonation of the 105mm gun while airborne. Eight of the 14 aircrew members lost their lives in this accident.

The 16 SOS deployed to Italy in support of Operation Deny Flight periodically from July 1993 until its termination on 28 August 1995. 16 SOS aircraft actively patrolled the skies over Bosnia and Herzegovina, providing protective air cover and close air support to UN protection forces.

While maintaining the Operation Deny Flight mission, the 16 SOS also deployed to other parts of the world for 184 days. From 18 September-19 October 1994, it deployed to Cuba in support of Operation Uphold Democracy and provided air support to coalition forces during the ouster of General Raoul Cédras and the restoration of Jean-Bertrand Aristide in Haiti. Additionally, from 30 January −2 March 1995, the 16th SOS returned to Africa in support of Operation United Shield, the withdrawal of UN forces from Mogadishu, Somalia. On the final night of this operation, the gunships provided real-time intelligence to ground commanders via armed reconnaissance and surveillance during the U.S. Marine amphibious withdrawal from Mogadishu.

Operation Deliberate Force began on 19 August 1995. It was the largest NATO air operation in history. The 16 SOS flew multiple combat search and rescue sorties from 6–8 September in support of the rescue attempt of a French Mirage aircrew downed by a surface-to-air missile near Pale. During the operation, which lasted until 15 September, the 16th expended 268 rounds of 105mm and 125 rounds of 40mm against early warning radar sites and command and control facilities. The 16th also participated in Operations Decisive Endeavor, Joint Endeavor, Assured Response, Deliberate Guard, Joint Guard, Goal Keeper, and Wintering Over.

Following the 11 September terrorist attacks the 16th deployed on 11 November 2001 to an undisclosed location near Afghanistan to support Operation Enduring Freedom. The day after arriving in Afghanistan, the 16th attacked Taliban and Al-Qaeda forces near the city of Konduz in support of Northern Alliance forces, and was directly responsible for the city's surrender the next day. On 26 November the squadron supported the suppression of a rebellion at the prison fort of Qala-i-Jangi While supporting the beleaguered U.S. CIA and allied British forces throughout the night with withering 40mm and 105mm fire, Spectre succeeded in ending the rebellion of Taliban and Al-Qaeda POWs.

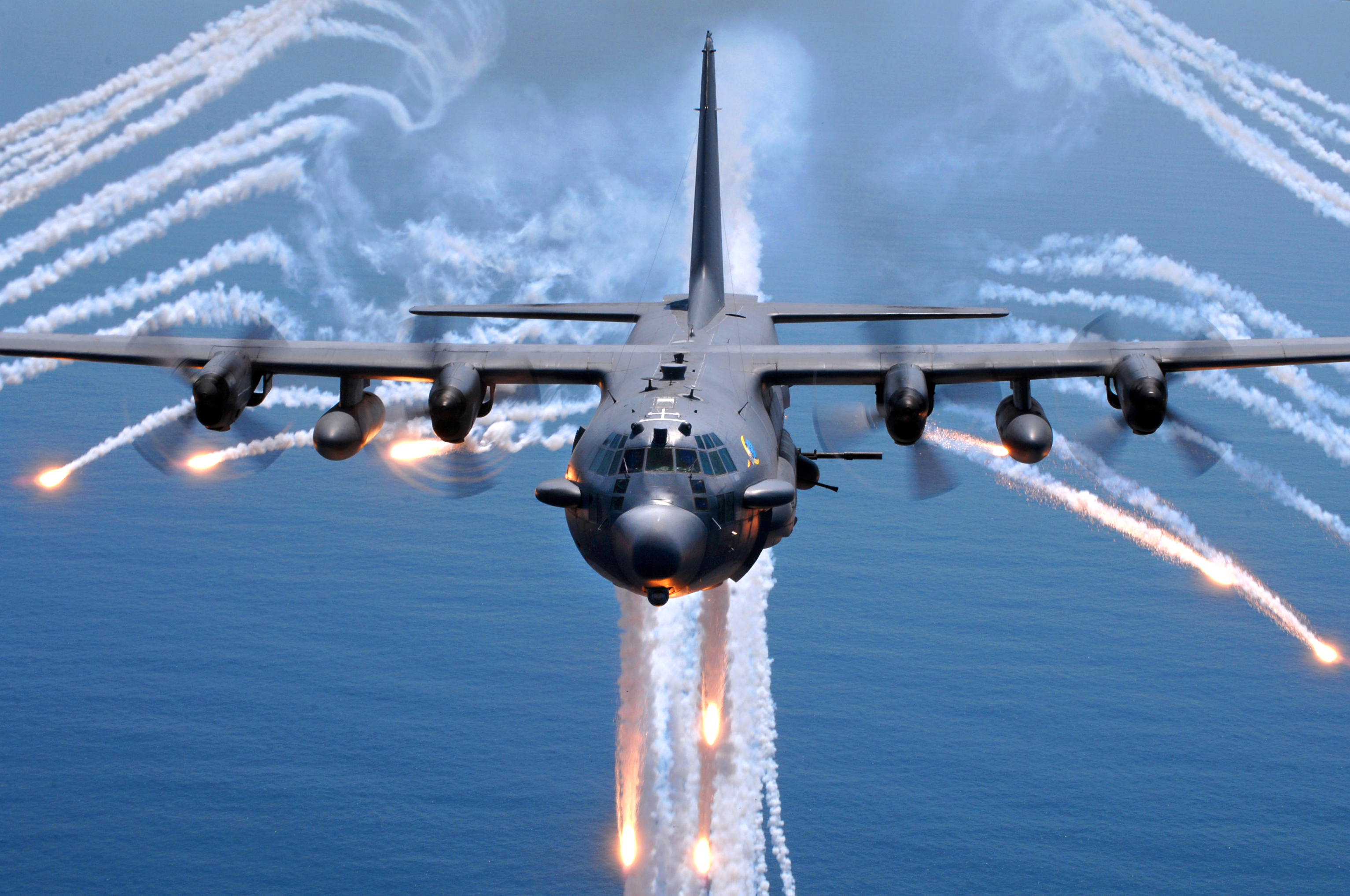
An AC-130 fires its flares off, 2007.

The 16th also flew missions over Mazār-e Sharīf, Kunduz, Kandahar, Shkin, Asadabad, Bagram, Baghran, Tora Bora, and nearly every other part of Afghanistan. The squadron has participated in a number of operations within Afghanistan including Operations Full Throttle, Roll Tide, and Eagle Fury. It also performed on-call close air support and armed reconnaissance over Kandahar after an assassination attempt against Afghanistan's President, Hamid Karzai.

In March 2002, the 16th flew 39 combat missions in support of Operation Anaconda in Afghanistan. With only 3 aircraft and 3 crews, the squadron amassed 322 combat hours over 12 days, resulting in 45 enemies killed in action, nine vehicles destroyed, 11 damaged vehicles, and 12 destroyed and 25 damaged buildings. During the intense fighting, the squadron expended more than 1,300 40MM and 1,200 105MM rounds. Their actions earned them the 2002 Mackay Trophy, and 2002 Air Force aviator valor awards. In addition, in 2002 the 16th SOS was the third most deployed unit in the Air Force.

=== Cannon Air Force Base ===
After over three decades with Hurlburt Field as its home station, the squadron relocated to Cannon Air Force Base in 2009. On 27 May 2015, AFSOC retired the final AC-130H Spectre Gunship in service, tail number #69-6569 "Excalibur". The squadron converted to AC-130W Stinger IIs (previously designated MC-130W) during 2015.

The 16th commenced transition to the AC-130J Ghostrider aircraft in April 2022 and retired its last AC-130W in July 2022.

=== Operations ===
- World War II
- Vietnam War
- Operation Urgent Fury
- Operation Just Cause
- Operation Desert Shield
- Operation Desert Storm
- Operation Continue Hope
- Operation Deny Flight
- Operation Uphold Democracy
- Operation Deliberate Force
- Operation Decisive Endeavor
- Operation Joint Endeavor
- Operation Assured Response
- Operation Deliberate Guard
- Operation Joint Guard
- Operation Goal Keeper
- Operation Wintering Over
- Operation Enduring Freedom
- Operation Iraqi Freedom
- Operation Inherent Resolve

== Lineage ==
16th Ferrying Squadron

- Constituted as the 16th Air Corps Ferrying Squadron on 18 February 1942

Activated on 16 April 1942
Redesignated 16th Ferrying Squadron on 12 May 1943
Disbanded on 1 April 1944
Reconstituted and consolidated with the 16th Combat Cargo Squadron and the 16th Special Operations Squadron as the 16th Special Operations Squadron on 19 September 1985

16th Combat Cargo Squadron

- Constituted as the 16th Combat Cargo Squadron on 9 June 1944

Activated on 13 June 1944
Inactivated on 29 December 1945
Disbanded on 8 October 1948; reconstituted on 19 September 1985)
Reconstituted and consolidated with the 16th Ferrying Squadron and the 16th Special Operations Squadron as the 16th Special Operations Squadron on 19 September 1985

16th Special Operations Squadron

- Constituted as the 16th Special Operations Squadron on 11 October 1968

Activated on 30 October 1968
Consolidated with the 16th Ferrying Squadron and the 16th Combat Cargo Squadron on 19 September 1985

=== Assignments ===
- Middle West Sector, Air Corps Ferrying Command (later 5th Ferrying Group), 16 April 1942 – 1 April 1944
- 4th Combat Cargo Group, 13 June 1944
- Army Air Forces, India-Burma Theater, 5 September 1945
- 4th Combat Cargo Group, c. October–29 December 1945
- 8th Tactical Fighter Wing, 30 October 1968 (attached to 388th Tactical Fighter Wing, 19 July 1974 – 8 December 1975)
- Tactical Air Command, 8 December 1975
- 1st Special Operations Wing, 12 December 1975
- 1st Special Operations Group (later 16 Operations Group, 1st Special Operations Group), 22 September 1992
- 27th Special Operations Group, 1 June 2009 – present

=== Stations ===
- Hensley Field, Texas, 16 April 1942
- Love Field, Texas, 8 September 1942 – 1 April 1944
- Syracuse Army Air Base, New York, 13 June 1944
- Bowman Field, Kentucky, 16 August–9 November 1944
- Sylhet Airfield, India, 7 December 1944
- Agartala Airport, India, 26 December 1944
- Chittagong Airfield, India, 31 January 1945
- Namponmao Airfield, Burma, 11 June 1945
- Ledo Airfield, India, 3 September 1945
- Namponmao Airfield, Burma, October 1945
- Ondal Airfield, India, November–29 December 1945
- Ubon Royal Thai Air Force Base, Thailand, 30 October 1968
- Korat Royal Thai Air Force Base, Thailand, 19 July 1974
- Hurlburt Field, Florida, 12 December 1975
- Cannon Air Force Base, New Mexico, 1 June 2009 – present

=== Aircraft ===
- Ferried tactical and support aircraft (1942–1944) C–47, 1944, 1945; C–46, 1944–1945. AC–130, 1968–.
- Douglas C-47 Skytrain (1944, 1945)
- Curtiss C-46 Commando (1944–1945)
- Lockheed AC-130A, AC-130E, AC-130H Spectre (1968–2015)
- Antonov An-32 (2002)(On loan from Valan Intl. Cargo Charter)
- Lockheed AC-130W Stinger II (2015 – 2022)
- Lockheed AC-130J Ghostrider (2022 - present)
