= Operation Fluid Drive =

Operation Fluid Drive was a non-combatant evacuation operation led by the United States to evacuate American citizens and other foreign nationals from Beirut, Lebanon, during the Lebanese Civil War. On 20 June 1976, USS Spiegel Grove transported 110 Americans and 157 nationals of other countries from Lebanon to Piraeus, Greece. On 27 July, 300 additional persons, including 155 Americans, were evacuated to Piraeus. The cruiser USS Little Rock was present off the Lebanese coast during both evacuations.

== First evacuation ==
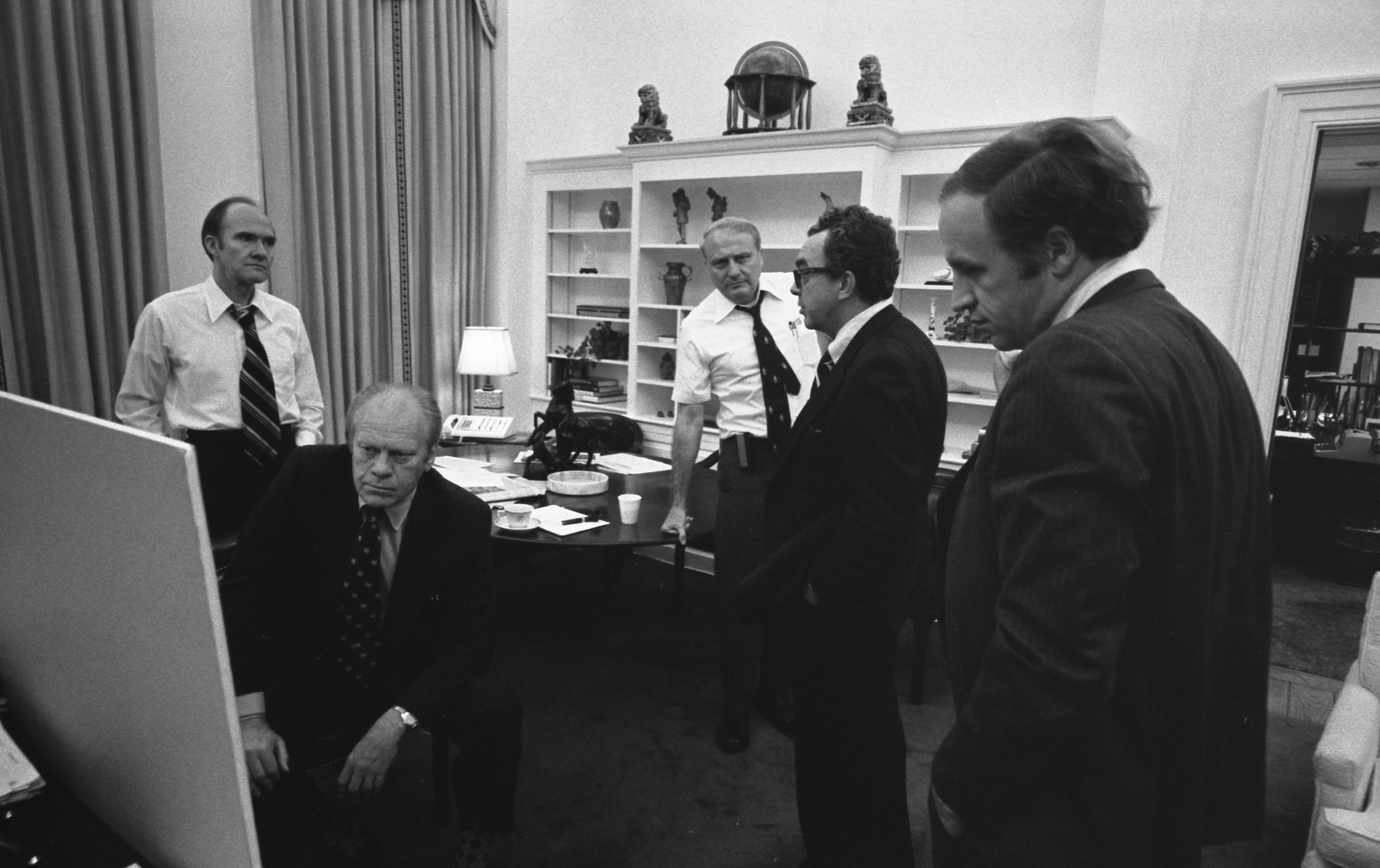
United States President Gerald Ford monitors the evacuation of American citizens from Beirut.

United States President Gerald Ford ordered commencement of the operation on 20 June 1976 at 1:23 a.m. EDT. Fighting on land routes to Damascus, Syria, disrupted the original plan of a road convoy evacuation.

At 10:37 a.m. Beirut time, the United States Navy LCU 1654 landing craft opened its bow ramp at Bain Militaire to allow 276 evacuees to board. U.S. diplomats in Lebanon had finished the truce arrangements needed for the evacuation only hours beforehand. Organisation on the ground within Beirut leant on the knowledge and connections of British Charge d'Affaires, Geoffrey Hancock, who used his good relations with parties involved in the conflict in efforts to assure security. The evacuees were unarmed, and were escorted by numerous Palestinian guerrillas and leftist Lebanese army soldiers. One family refused to continue with the evacuation when told, incorrectly, that their dog was not allowed.

After a 25-minute trip, the landing craft reached USS Spiegel Grove, which remained three miles offshore. The United States Sixth Fleet flagship, USS Little Rock, pulled alongside USS Spiegel Grove to greet the refugees on board. The United States convoy consisted of five ships in total. One of the escort ships was the USS Connole (FF 1056), and three Soviet warships, including Kerch, shadowed the fleet. USS Spiegel Grove then sailed to Piraeus, Greece, arriving on 22 June 1976.

== Second evacuation ==
On 26 July 1976, the Sixth Fleet prepared to evacuate an additional 500 Americans and others from Lebanon. Dockside security was again provided by the Palestine Liberation Organization. Although 500 people were signed up to leave the country, only 155 Americans and 145 nationals of other countries were evacuated.
