= Operation Autumn Return =

Operation Autumn Return was a non-combatant evacuation operation of the United States armed forces conducted from September 22 to October 4, 2002, in Côte d'Ivoire.

== Background ==
A coup d'état against President Henri Konan Bédié on Christmas Eve 1999 led to the installation of military junta leader General Robert Guéï as president. Guéï lost the presidency in October 2000 elections to Laurent Gbagbo of the Ivorian Popular Front. Guéï refused to relinquish power, leading to street protests and Guéï's flight to Gouessesso near the border with Liberia. Guéï retained some political power and was included in a reconciliation forum in 2001, in which he agreed to refrain from undemocratic methods. Guéï withdrew from the forum agreement in September 2002 and on September 19, 2002, the Ivorian Civil War began. Guéï, his wife, and several members of his family, as well as interior minister Émile Boga Doudou, were killed under unclear circumstances that day.

== The evacuation ==
The ensuing crisis threatened the safety of hundreds of foreign nationals, including U.S. citizens. The Ambassador to Côte d'Ivoire, Arlene Render, requested an evacuation of American citizens. From September 22 to October 4, 2002, United States European Command (USEUCOM) directed the evacuation of over 300 U.S. and third-party citizens. This was done mainly by U.S. special forces units, including the 1st Battalion - 10th Special Forces Group (Airborne), Panzer Kaserne, Boeblingen, Germany, support and command and control elements of the Special Operations Command-Europe (SOCEUR), and the 352d Special Operations Group stationed at Mildenhall, England.

On September 24, about 200 U.S. Special Operations Command - Europe (SOCEUR) troops were deployed from Stuttgart, Germany, and U.S. military bases in England, initially quartering and setting up a Command and Control center at the international airport in Accra, Ghana, before deploying to the Yamoussoukro airport and linking up with French military forces already set up there. Several U.S. Air Force Special Operations MC-130 Hercules transport aircraft deployed from England in direct support of U.S. Special Forces. Approximately 70 U.S. Special Operations soldiers conducted joint ground operations in and around Yamoussoukro, Korhogo, and Bouaké. Several evacuation operations were conducted in the midst of repeated engagements between local government and rebel forces.

One notable evacuation occurred at the International Christian Academy at Bouaké, a Christian boarding school attended mainly by children of American missionaries. After rebel and government forces exchanged heavy gunfire and mortar shelling in the vicinity of the school, U.S. Army Special Forces troops - taking advantage of having earlier conducted a lightly contested seizure of an airfield about 40 miles away from the school - safeguarded the school and escorted about 160 students (including 101 American children ages 6 to 18), plus 30 or more staff & their children - including some infants - 66 miles south to the capital of Yamoussoukro via a convoy of cars, trucks, and minibuses escorted by up-armored HUMVEE to the secured airfield where they boarded U.S. Air Force C-130 aircraft under heavy security for evacuation to Yamoussoukro and then on to Abidjan or Accra, Ghana. The refugees arrived safely late September 25 at a reception center in Yamoussoukro that officials at the U.S. embassy (based at Abidjan, the county's administrative center) had set up.

== Awards ==
U.S. Special Operations troops stationed in Germany, and England were awarded the Joint Service Commendation Medal and the Humanitarian Service Medal for their conduct during the time period between 22 September and 4 October 2002.
