= Operation Shepherd Venture =

United States armed forces operation

Operation Shepherd Venture was an operation carried out by United States armed forces in Dakar, Senegal. The operation lasted from June 10, 1998, until June 17 of that year.

The onset of the Guinea-Bissau Civil War in June 1998 led to the evacuation of more than 3,000 foreign nationals. A forward operating task force of about 130 personal was deployed from the United States European Command. The decision was made to withdraw US nationals and embassy personal by commercial shipping and vessels chartered by the US State Department.

Following this decision the personnel (about 130) from Dakar were redeployed to their home bases.

Forces committed included members of the 10th Special Forces Group, EODMU EIGHT, MC-130 Combat Talon aircraft from the 352nd Special Operations Group, and KC-135 Stratotanker crews from United States Air Forces Europe. The operation was under the command of U. S. Navy Captain Robert A. Schoultz.
