= Operation Silver Anvil =

U.S. forces non-combatant evacuation operation in Sierra Leone in 1992

Operation Silver Anvil was a non-combatant evacuation operation carried out by United States armed forces in Sierra Leone in April–May 1992. The operation successfully evacuated more than 400 people from the country.

President Joseph Saidu Momoh was overthrown in a coup d'état on April 29, 1992. The evacuating force from Special Operations Command Europe (SOCEUR), a subcommand of United States European Command, was commanded by Brigadier General Richard W. Potter. Elements from Company C, 1st Battalion, 10th Special Forces Group (Airborne) [1-10th SFG (A)], and the 39th Special Operations Wing (later re-designated the 352d Special Operations Group), along with communication specialists from the SOCEUR Signal Detachment, other SOCEUR staff, two MC-130 Combat Talons from the 7th Special Operations Squadron, two HC-130 tankers from the 67th Special Operations Squadron, aircrews, combat controllers, and maintenance personnel.

Company C was informed of the coup in Sierra Leone's capital, Freetown, on the night of April 29 while conducting an exercise in Stuttgart, Germany. Work immediately began on mission planning and within 15 hours had "performed mission analysis, configured the unit's equipment, wrote orders, issued war-stocks, loaded the aircraft, and deployed." Despite the widespread civil unrest, the special operations force, under the operational control of United States Air Forces in Europe (USAFE), "developed a rapport with the local military" and over the next two days evacuated 438 people, including 42 third-country nationals and several United States Air Force Medical Civil Action Program (MEDCAP) personnel. Two C-141s flew 136 people from Freetown to Rhein-Main Air Base, Germany, while C-130 sorties carried another 302 to Dakar, Senegal.
