= Operation Assured Response =

1996 Evacuation operation in Liberia

Operation Assured Response was a non-combatant evacuation operation in Liberia carried out by United States armed forces in 1996.

In April 1996, in response to skirmishes in Monrovia between supporters of Charles Taylor and Roosevelt Johnson, then President of the United States Bill Clinton made an executive order for United States armed forces to evacuate United States citizens, specifically without dual-liberian citizenship. Clinton explained his executive order in a letter sent April 11, 1996 to then Representatives House speaker Newt Gingrich.
