= Operation Shining Express =

- Part of Second Liberian Civil War
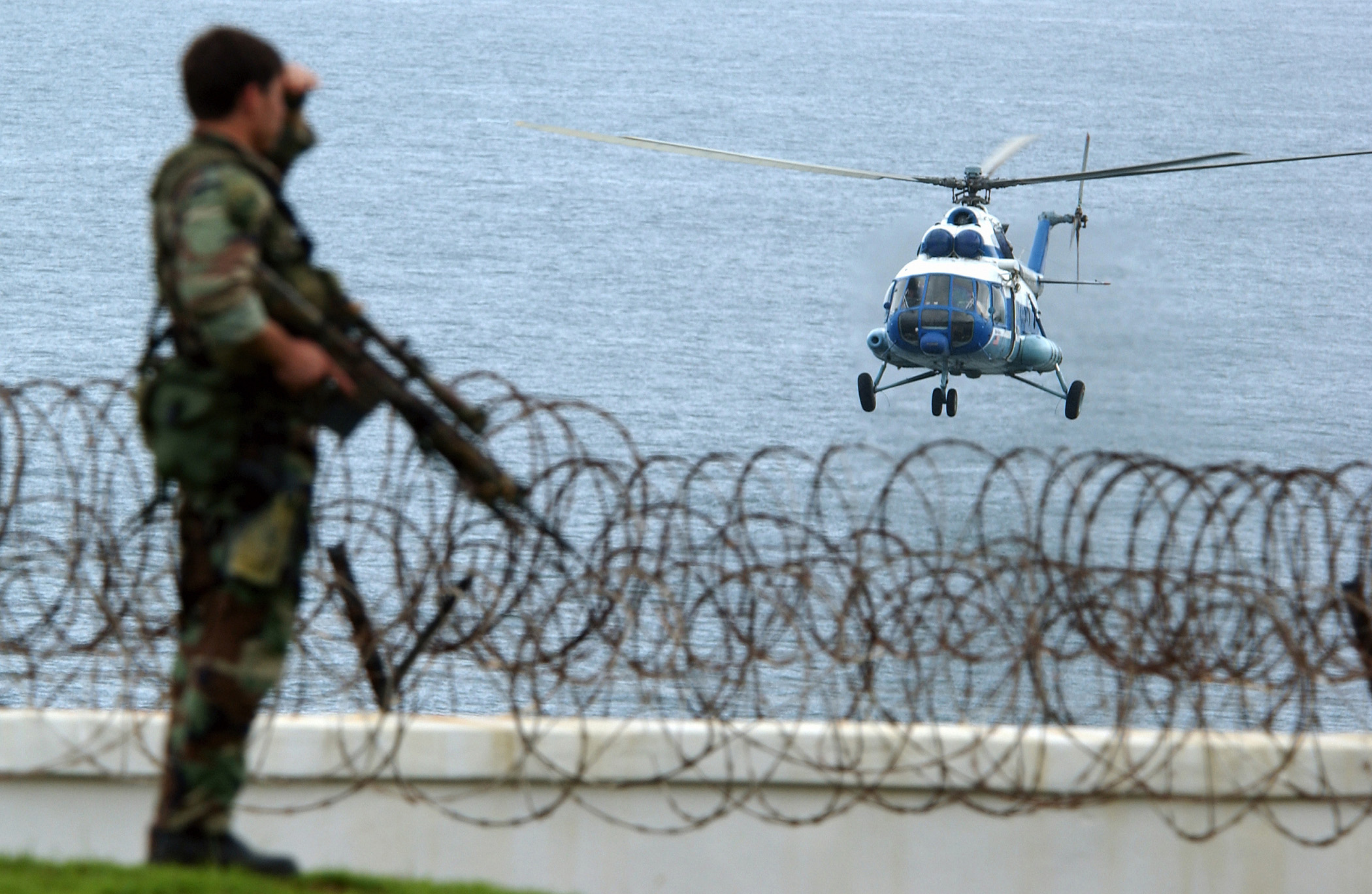
- A U.S. military special operations security team member observes a United Nations helicopter approaching the American embassy in Monrovia in June 2003
- Location: Monrovia, Liberia
- Objective: Evacuation of Americans from Liberia
- Date: June 2003 – July 2003

Operation Shining Express was the June 2003 deployment of an American Joint Task Force task, consisting of the amphibious assault ship USS Kearsarge (LHD-3), the 3rd Battalion 2nd Marines (3/2), and a detachment of HH-60G helicopters and Pararescuemen from the 56th Rescue Squadron to evacuate U.S. embassy personnel and American citizens during the Second Liberian Civil War. The deployment was announced on June 12, 2003 and lasted until July 2003.

It followed the successful 1990 rescue effort in Liberia, Operation Sharp Edge.

== Notable Participants ==
- Robert J. O'Neill (U.S. Navy SEAL)
