= Talon =

Talon or talons may refer to:

== Science and technology ==
- Talon (anatomy), the claw of a bird of prey
- TALON (database), a database maintained by the US Air Force
- Brodifacoum, a rodenticide, also known as the brand Talon
- an anti-vehicle-ramming spike strip-like net

== Entertainment and media ==
- Talon (cards), in some card games, the remainder of a deck of cards
- Talon (Smallville), a fictional coffee shop in the TV series
- Talon (roller coaster), an inverted roller coaster at Dorney Park & Wildwater Kingdom
- Talon, a 2014 novel by Julie Kagawa
- The Talon, the newspaper of Los Altos High School, US

=== Fictional characters ===
- Talons, assassins of the Court of Owls in DC Comics
- Talon (DC Comics), a character from Teen Titans
- Talon, a character from Static Shock
- Talon (Transformers), an autobot from Transformers
- Talon, a character from The Legend of Zelda: Ocarina of Time
- Talon Karrde, a character from Star Wars
- Talon Maza, a character from Gargoyles
- Talon Labarthe, a character from in Ratatouille
- Achille Talon, comic book series and character
- Darth Talon, a character from Star Wars: Legacy
- Talon of the Silver Hawk or Talwin Hawkins in Conclave of Shadows
- Talon, in the Dark-Hunter series
- X-23 or Talon, in Marvel Comics
- Talon, in the Prey video game
- Talon, in the video game Primal Rage
- Talon, a member of the Sackett family in various works by Louis L'Amour
- Talon, a dog in the film Snow Buddies
- Talon, in the TV series Inspector Gadget

=== Other fictional entities ===
- Talon light fighter, in the Wing Commander franchise
- F/A-37 Talon, an aircraft in the 2005 film Stealth
- A terrorist group in the video game Overwatch

=== Music ===
- Talon, a French term for the bow frog of a string instrument
- Talons (band), a British band
- Talons (EP), a 2009 EP by Josh Dies
- "Talons" (song), a song on the 2008 Bloc Party album Intimacy

== Transportation ==
=== Ground ===
- Eagle Talon, an automobile produced by the Eagle division of Chrysler
- Foster-Miller TALON, a US military unmanned ground vehicle
- Talon MHS-II, a car built for the Can-Am series and used briefly in 1977

=== Aviation ===
- Lockheed MC-130 Combat Talon, a variant of the C-130 aircraft operated by the U.S. Air Force
- Northrop T-38 Talon, a US-built supersonic jet trainer for military pilots
- RotorWay A600 Talon, an American helicopter design
- Wills Wing Talon, an American hang glider design

== Other uses ==
- Talon (actor) (born 1969), in the adult entertainment industry
- Talon (bearer bond), a document attached to a bearer bond which entitled the holder to a block of further coupons
- Talon (rural locality), in Russia
- Talon (surname)
- Talon, Nièvre, a commune in France
- Talon Esports, a professional esports organisation based in Hong Kong
  - PSG Talon, a professional League of Legends team
- Talon Zipper, an American zipper company
- San Antonio Talons, San Antonio, Texas's arena football team, formerly the Tulsa Talons
- The mascot of the Major League Soccer team D.C. United
- Another name for ogee moulding in woodworking

== See also ==
- Operation Talon (disambiguation), the codename of several military or police operations
- Tallon (disambiguation)
- Talion (disambiguation)
- Talen (disambiguation)
- Tallinn, the capital city of Estonia
