= Talen (name) =

Talen is a given name and surname. Notable people with the name include:

== Given name ==
- Talen Horton-Tucker (born 2000), American basketball player
- Talen Jourdan (born 1999), American wheelchair basketball player

== Surname ==
- Bill Talen, American performer and playwright of Reverend Billy and the Church of Stop Shopping
- Bjørn Talén (1890–1945), opera singer
- John Talen (born 1965), cyclist
- Julie Talen, filmmaker
- Rebecca Talen (born 1993), cyclist
- Dick Talens (born 1986), entrepreneur and fitness coach

== See also ==
- Talin (disambiguation), includes a list of people with the name Talin
- Talon (surname)
- Talon (disambiguation) § Fictional characters, list of characters with the name Talon
