= Talen =

Talen may also refer to:

- Talen (name) includes list of people with the name Talen
- Talen, Rajgarh, village in Madhya Pradesh, India
- Transcription activator-like effector nuclease (TALEN)
- Talen Energy, an energy company
- Royal Talens, an art supplies company

== See also ==
- Talon (disambiguation)
- Taal (disambiguation), the singular form of the Dutch/Afrikaans word talen
- Talin (disambiguation)
