= Talon (surname) =

Talon may refer to the following people

- Antoine Omer Talon (1760–1811), French counter-revolutionary
- Durwin Talon, Canadian illustrator
- Jean Talon (1626–1694), the first intendant of New France
- Nicolas Talon (1605–1691), French Jesuit, historian, and ascetical writer
- Patrice Talon (born 1958), Beninese businessman and politician
- Pierre Talon (1676–?), French-Canadian explorer
- Zoé Talon, comtesse du Cayla (1785–1852), an intimate friend of Louis XVIII of France

== See also ==
- Tallon
