= Eagle talon =

Eagle talon, eagle's talon, talons of eagles, or variation, may refer to:

- The talon (anatomy) of an eagle is part of the claw on the eagle's foot
- Eagle Talon, a 2-door 2+2 hatchback coupe
- The Eagle's Talons, 1923 U.S. film serial
- Talons of the Eagle, 1992 U.S. martial arts film
- Eagle Talon (anime), (Japanese: 秘密結社 鷹の爪, romanized: Himitsu Kessha Taka no Tsume), 2006 Japanese animated television show

== See also ==
- Eagle (disambiguation)
- Talon (disambiguation)
