= Talin =

Talin may refer to:

== Places ==
- Talin, Armenia, a city
- Tálín, a municipality and village in the Czech Republic
- Tallinn, capital of Estonia
- Talin, Iran, a village in West Azerbaijan Province
- Talin, Syria, a village in Tartus Governorate

== Other ==
- Talin (protein), the protein that connects integrin to the cytoskeleton
- Thaumatin, a flavoring
- Facundo Talín (born 1985), Argentine footballer
- David Joiner (born 1958), Game programmer, hacker, going by "Talin"

== See also ==
- Talen (disambiguation)
- Talon (disambiguation)
