= Antoine Omer Talon =

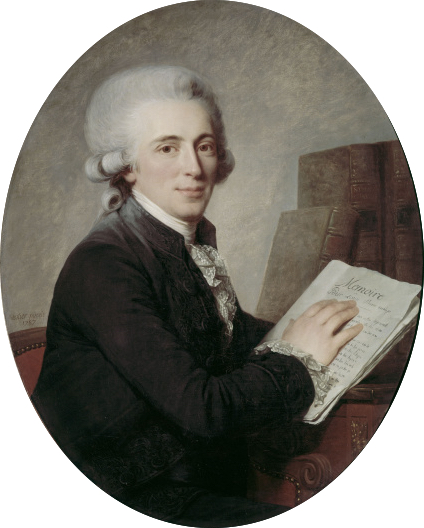
- Portrait of Antoine-Omer Talon, marquis of Boulay and Tremblay-le-Vicomte, by Antoine Vestier.
- Born: 20 January 1760; Paris
- Died: 18 August 1811 (aged 51); Gretz-Armainvilliers
- Occupation: Politician
- Children: Zoé Talon du Cayla, Denys-Omer Talon

Antoine Omer Talon (20 January 1760 in Paris–18 August 1811 in Gretz) was a French counter-revolutionary.

He was born in Paris on 20 January 1760, he was the father of Jean-Baptiste, seigneur of Boullay Thierry. He married Jeanne-Agnès-Gabrielle, countess of Pestre, from a rich family of nobles that originated from Belgium. He had two children, Denis-Mathieu-Claire (born on 20 November 1783 in Paris) and Zoé-Victoire (born 2 August 1785) in Boullay-Thierry. He later attended the French Parliament on July 1, 1781.

Talon along with Talleyrand fled to the United States in 1793 on the boat Alien Bill to Philadelphia. He took part in the founding of a colony named French Azilum. He later returned to France and took part in the Directory and consulate of the First French Empire. He died in Gretz in 1811.

== See also ==
- Thomas de Mahy de Favras

== Bibliography ==
- Jean Arrigon, Omer Talon, La Revue des Deux Mondes, 1952.
- Jules Michelet, History of the French Revolution, 1847-1850 (Histoire de la Révolution française, 1847-1850), Gallimard, 2007, 4 volumes
