= 550th Special Operations Squadron =

550th Special Operations Squadron

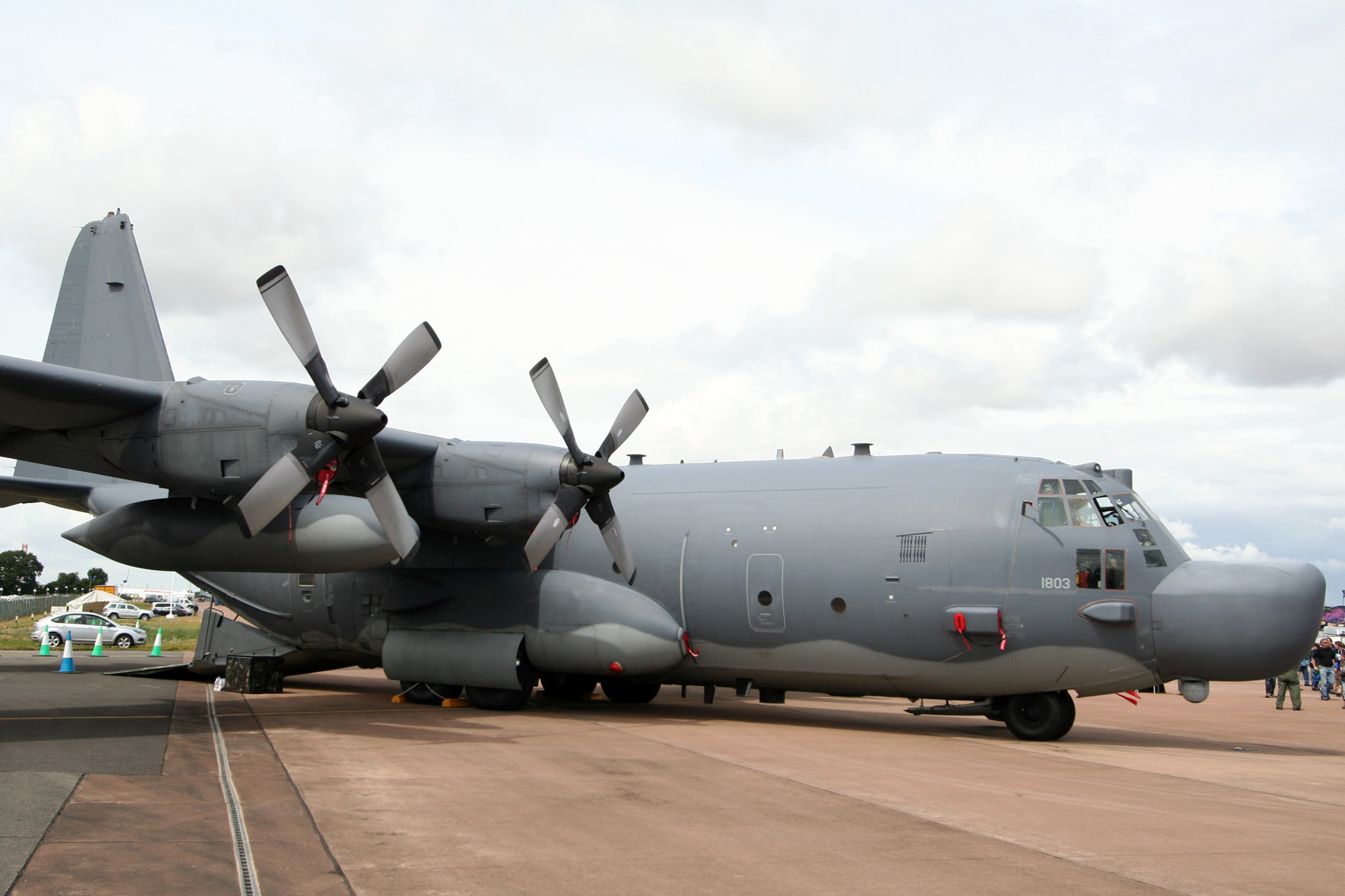
- Lockheed MC-130 as flown by the squadron
- Active: 1971–2016
- Country: United States
- Branch: United States Air Force
- Role: Special Operations Training
- Part of: Air Education and Training Command
- Garrison/HQ: Kirtland Air Force Base
- Nickname(s): Wolfpack
- Decorations: Air Force Outstanding Unit Award

Insignia
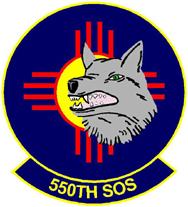
- 550th Special Operations Squadron emblem (approved 25 November 1987)

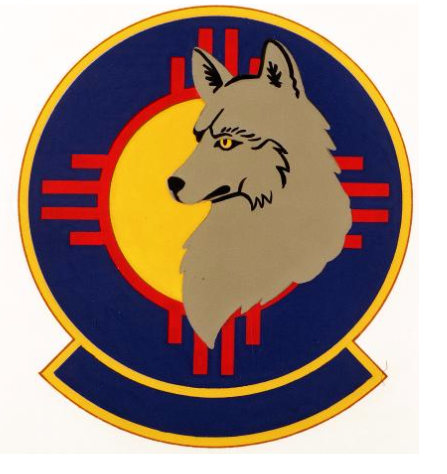
- 1550th Flying Training Squadron emblem (approved 22 May 1984)

The 550th Special Operations Squadron (nicknamed "Wolfpack") was a special operations flying training squadron of the United States Air Force.

It was activated in 1971 as the 1550th Flying Training Squadron, responsible for helicopter flying training. It relocated from Hill Air Force Base to Kirtland Air Force Base in 1976 and in 1987 converted to special operations training and was reequipped with fixed-wing aircraft. The squadron was redesignated as the 550th Flying Training Squadron in 1991 and as the 550th Special Operations Squadron in 1994, when it became part of the 58th Special Operations Wing at Kirtland Air Force Base, New Mexico. It operated Lockheed HC-130s and Lockheed MC-130s and was inactivated in 2016.

== History ==
The squadron was activated on 1 April 1971 as the 1550th Flying Training Squadron (FTS) at Hill Air Force Base with the 1550th Aircrew Training and Test Wing (later redesignated the 1550th Combat Crew Training Wing). It developed, conducted, and monitored helicopter flying training and was equipped with the Bell UH-1 Huey and its training variant, the TH-1. The 1550th received Kaman HH-43 Huskie rescue helicopters in 1973, although it ended operations with the HH-43 in 1975. In late 1975, the 1550th included nine Sikorsky HH-53B/C "Super Jolly Green Giant" helicopters and one Sikorsky CH-53 Sea Stallion for training. On 15 March 1976, the squadron was relocated to Kirtland Air Force Base, where it added responsibility for search and rescue missions.

In 1987, the 1550th FTS switched to providing special operations and combat rescue aircrew training, being reequipped with the Lockheed HC-130 search and rescue aircraft, which it operated until 1996. On 1 October 1991, it was redesignated as the 550th FTS and became part of the 542nd Operations Group when the 1550th Wing became the 542nd Crew Training Wing. In June 1992, the squadron received its first Lockheed MC-130H Combat Talon II aircraft, specially equipped for supporting special operations. The 550th transferred to the 58th Special Operations Wing's 58th Operations Group on 1 April 1994, and was concurrently renamed the 550th Special Operations Squadron (SOS).

The squadron participated in the quarterly Chile Flag exercise in addition to training pilots and aircrew. From 11 to 24 July, it conducted night low level and airdrop recovery training with Navy SEALs from Naval Air Station North Island in exercise Chile Flag 94-04. Between 13 and 17 March 1995, one of the squadron's Combat Talon IIs participated in experimental airdrops at Yuma Proving Ground testing two experimental air-drop systems for the Department of the Army's Early Entry and Lethality Battle Laboratories and the Air Force Air Mobility Warfare Center. The test set world records for the heaviest payload suspended by a parafoil (27,000 pounds) and for the largest parafoil dropped (7,200 square feet). In the summer and fall, 550th SOS Combat Talon II instructors flew with the 7th Special Operations Squadron to gain European theatre experience for training new aircrew.

From 23 July to 2 August 1996, the squadron participated in Chile Flag 96-05 with SEAL Team Five from North Island. It also participated in Chile Flag 97-01 in September and 97-02 in October. In March and April 1997, Combat Talon IIs from the squadron participated in bilateral joint exercises with Air Force Special Operations Command. The squadron also participated in AFSOC bilateral exercises in September, October, and December. Through 1998 the 550th continued participating in Chile Flag and bilateral AFSOC exercises. In 1999, the squadron won the AETC Maintenance Effectiveness Award for the best medium-aircraft category squadron in the command.

The 550th SOS graduated an average of 200 students a year for special operations and combat search and rescue. The squadron gave up its last MC-130P Combat Shadow aircraft in September 2013. In August 2016, its last MC-130H Hercules Combat Talon II special operations support aircraft were transferred to the 19th Special Operations Squadron, which took over the MC-130H training mission. It was inactivated on 29 September after its HC-130P/N Combat Kings were retired from the active Air Force and transferred to the Air Force Reserve.

== Lineage ==
- Designated as the 1550th Flying Training Squadron and activated on 1 April 1971

Redesignated 550th Flying Training Squadron on 1 October 1991
Redesignated 550th Special Operations Squadron on 1 April 1994
Inactivated on 29 September 2016

=== Assignments ===
- 1550th Aircrew Training and Test Wing (later 1550th Combat Crew Training Wing), 1 April 1971
- 542d Operations Group, 1 October 1991
- 58th Operations Group, 1 April 1994 – 29 September 2016

=== Stations ===
- Hill Air Force Base, Utah, 1 April 1971
- Kirtland Air Force Base, New Mexico, 15 March 1976 – 29 September 2016

=== Aircraft ===
- Sikorsky HH-3E Jolly Green Giant (1971– )
- Sikorsky HH-53 Super Jolly Green Giant (1971–)
- Bell UH-1N Twin Huey (1972–)
- Bell TH-1 Huey (1971–1987)
- Bell UH-1 Huey (1971–1987)
- Kaman HH-43 Huskie (1973–1975)
- Lockheed HC-130P King (1987–2016)
- Lockheed HC-130N King (1987–2016)
- Lockheed MC-130H Combat Talon II (1994–2016)
- Lockheed MC-130P Combat Shadow (1996–2013)
