= Zoé Talon du Cayla =

Mistress of Louis XVIII of France (1785–1852)

- Zoé Victoire Talon
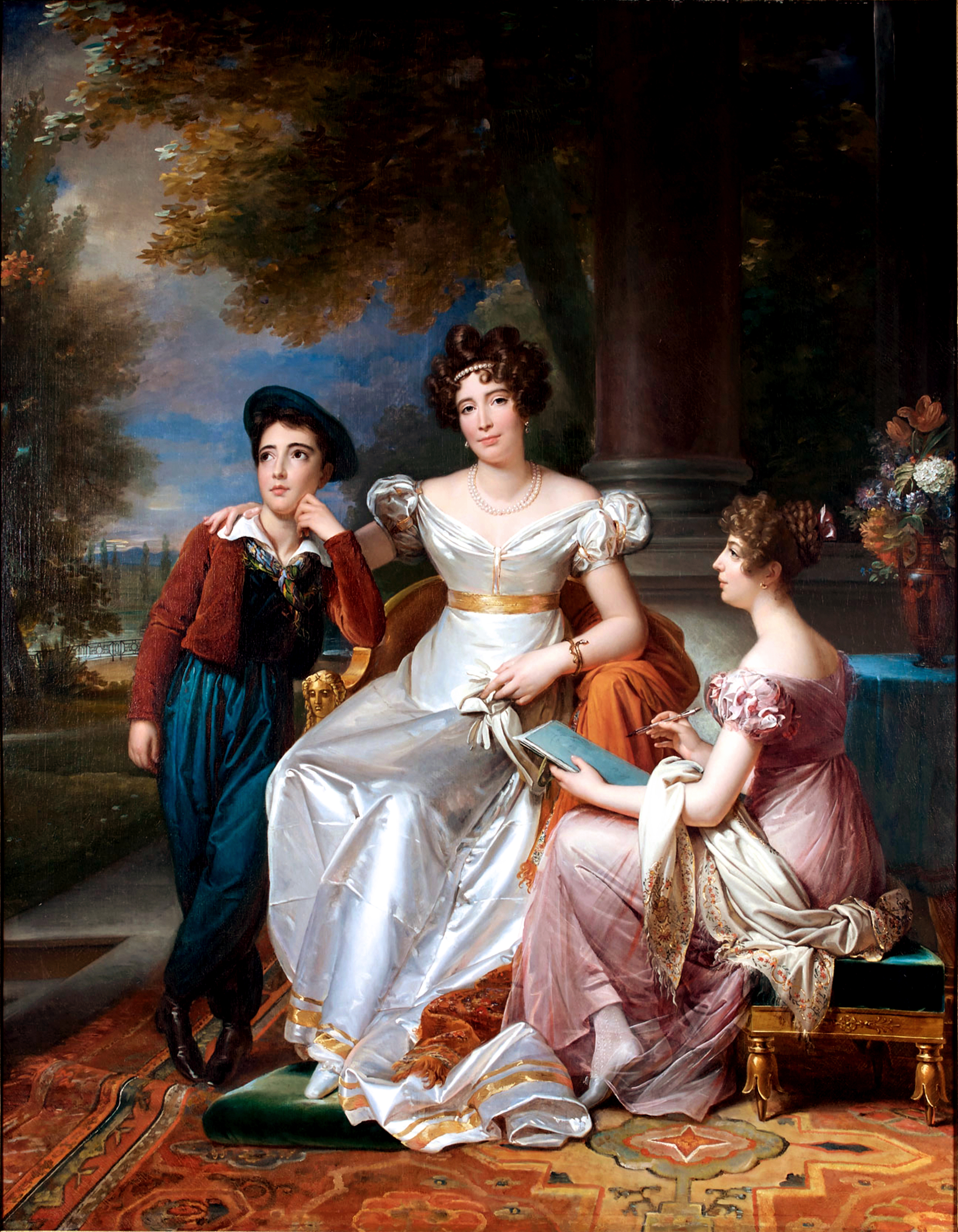
- Portrait of Zoé Victoire Talon, comtesse du Cayla, with her children by François Gérard circa 1825
- Born: August 1785; Le Boullay-Thierry
- Died: 19 March 1852 (aged 66); Paris
- Spouse(s): Achille de Baschi du Cayla
- Partner(s): Anne Jean Marie René Savary
- Parent(s): Antoine Omer Talon
- Relatives: Denys-Omer Talon

Zoé Victoire Talon, comtesse du Cayla (5 August 1785 – 19 March 1852), was an intimate friend and confidante of King Louis XVIII of France, and was his maîtresse-en-titre.

== Early life ==
She was born at Le Boullay-Thierry. She was the daughter of a royal avocat, Antoine Omer Talon (1760–1811), and was privately educated and groomed by Madame Campan, whose school Lamartine called an academy of feminine diplomacy.

== Relationship with the king ==
In 1802 she married the comte Baschi du Cayla (died 1851), with whom she had two children, Ugolin and Ugoline before being separated after prolonged litigation, which brought her to the attention of Louis XVIII, to whom she personally appealed for protection from her husband. She managed to retain the confidence, however, of her mother-in-law, a lady-in-waiting in the household of the comtesse de Provence, who now became titular queen of France. At the court of the restored Bourbons, Madame de Cayla was also the protégée of the vicomte Sosthènes I de La Rochefoucauld and from about 1817, at first very discreetly, became the major avenue through which the Ultras were able to influence the aged and emotionally needy Louis XVIII, who lavished favours upon Madame de Cayla, though she was unlikely ever to have been his mistress.

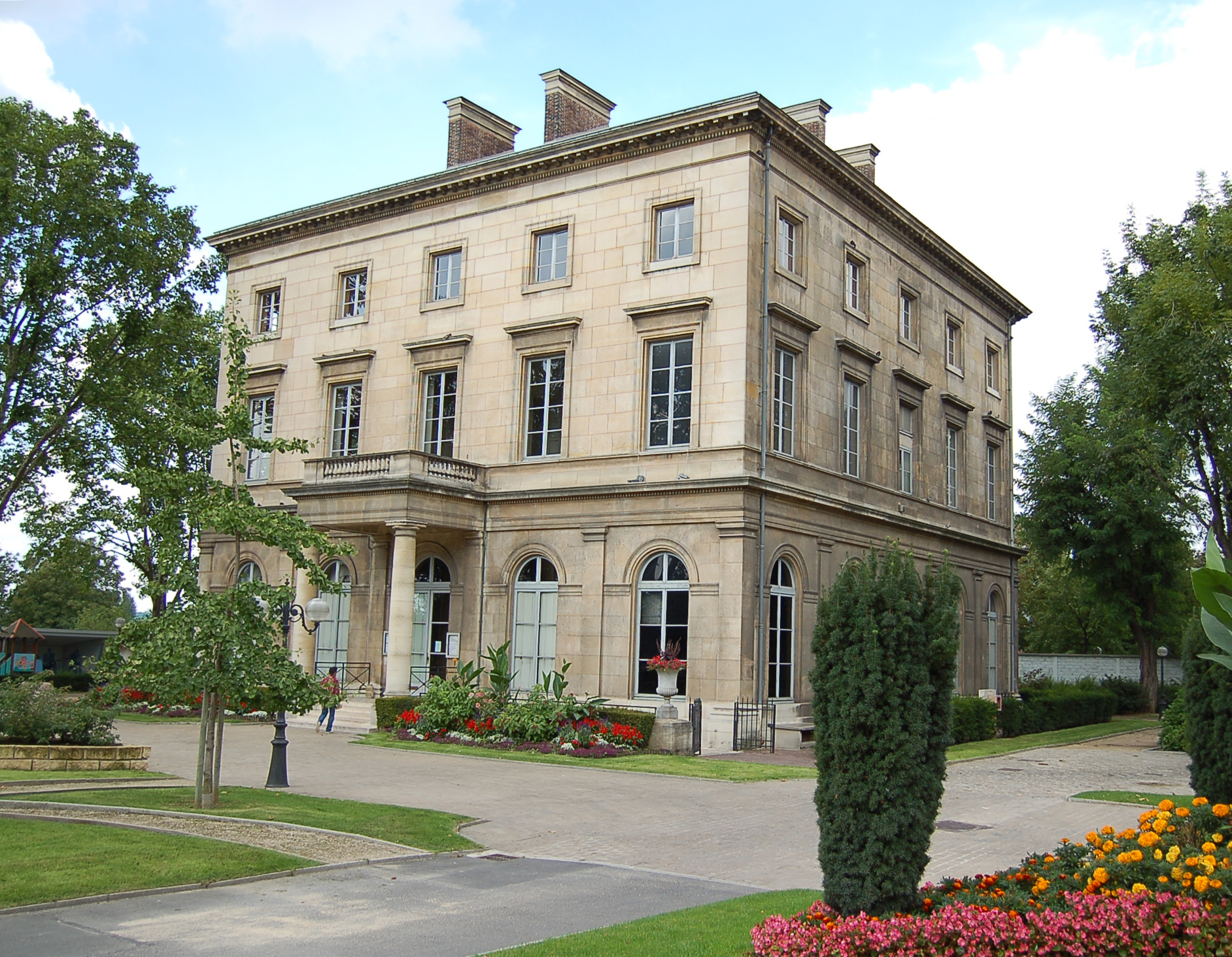
Château de Saint-Ouen, 1821–22

In 1821 the king had the Château de Saint-Ouen, north of Paris, razed and rebuilt by the architect Jacques-Marie Huvé; the first stones were laid 2 May 1821, in the presence of the king and the comtesse. The old château had been the site of the signing of papers that restored the brother of Louis XVI to the throne of France. It was decorated and furnished out of Louis XVIII's pocket, without a trace in the official budget of the Maison du Roi, and completed by the end of 1822, when Mme de Cayla officially "purchased" it from the architect, 29 October 1822. The King's house-warming gift was a dessert service of Sèvres porcelain painted with views of the new château.

She was also the avenue through which office-seekers could find places. After the death of her royal patron in 1824 she turned her attention to agriculture, raising a new breed of sheep named in her honour, from a long-haired Nubian ram that had been presented to her by Muhammad Ali, viceroy of Egypt. She supported the pile carpet manufactory of Savonnerie in its last independent days before it was absorbed by the Gobelins in 1826.

== Later life ==
During a visit which she paid to London in 1829, Greville observed in his diary:

She must have been good-looking in her youth; her countenance is lively, her eyes are piercing, clear complexion, and very handsome hands and arms; but the best part about her seemed to be the magnificent pearls she wore, though these are not so fine as Lady Conyngham's.

== Death ==
She died in 1852 at her château of Saint-Ouen.

== Legacy ==
Among gardeners, her name is commemorated in the Rose 'Comtesse du Cayla', not in fact a rose of her period, but instead a China rose raised by Pierre Guillot in 1902.

== Sources ==
- The American Cyclopædia: A Popular Dictionary of General Knowledge (1873) s.v. "Zoé Victoire de Cayla".
- Arthur Léon Imbert de Saint-Amand, (Elizabeth
- Gilbert (Davis) Martin, tr.) The Duchess of Berry and the Court of Louis XVIII 1892
