= Taal =

Taal may refer to:

- An early name for the Afrikaans language
- The South African creole language Tsotsitaal

== Geography ==
- Taal, Batangas, a municipality in the Philippines
- Taal Lake, a freshwater lake in the Philippines
- Taal Volcano, an active volcano in the Philippines

== Arts and fiction ==
- Taal (instrument), Indian hand clash cymbals
- Tala (music) or taal, the term used in Indian classical music to refer to musical meter
- Taal (film), 1999 Indian Hindi film by Subhash Ghai
- Taal, God of Beasts in the universe of Warhammer Fantasy

== See also ==
- Tala (disambiguation)
- Ta'al (Arab Movement for Renewal), an Arab-Israeli political party founded by Ahmad Tibi
- Ta'al is also an abbreviation for tat aluf, Israeli military rank
- Talen (disambiguation), the plural form of the word taal
