= Lockheed MC-130 =

Special mission military aircraft

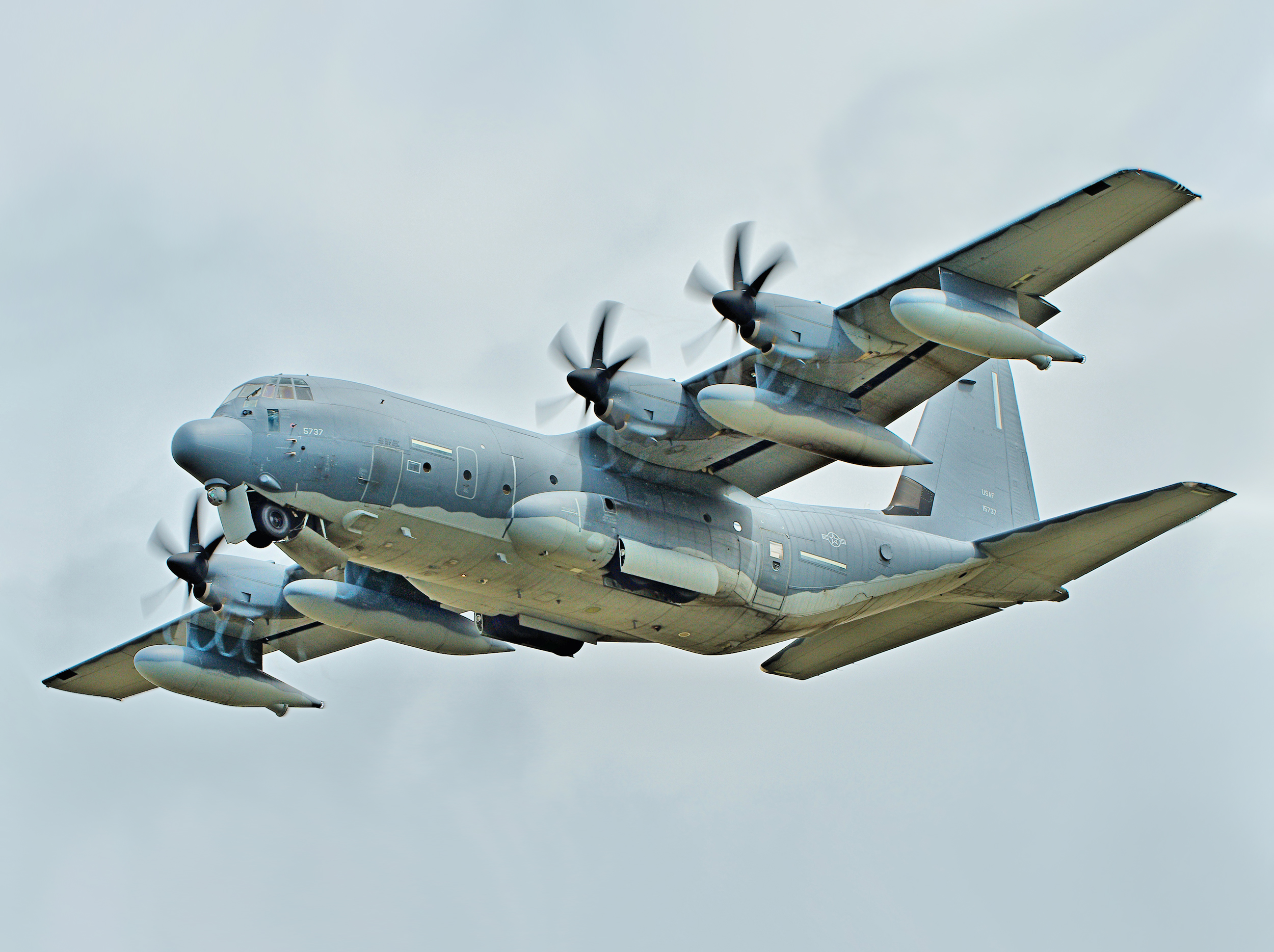
- A MC-130J Commando II in 2016

General information
- Type: STOL Special operations military transport aircraft
- Manufacturer: Lockheed Corporation
- Status: Active
- Primary user: United States Air Force
- Number built: MC-130E: 18; MC-130H: 24; MC-130P: 28; MC-130W: 12; MC-130J: 64

History
- Introduction date: MC-130E: 1966; MC-130P: 1986; MC-130H: 1991; MC-130W: 2006; MC-130J: 2012
- First flight: MC-130J: April 2011
- Retired: MC-130E: April 15, 2013 MC-130P: May 15, 2015 MC-130H: April 2, 2023
- Developed from: C-130 Hercules; C-130J Super Hercules

The Lockheed MC-130 is the basic designation for a family of special-mission aircraft operated by the United States Air Force Special Operations Command (AFSOC), a wing of the Air Education and Training Command, and an AFSOC-gained wing of the Air Force Reserve Command. Based on the Lockheed C-130 Hercules transport, the MC-130s' missions are the infiltration, exfiltration, and resupply of special operations forces, and the air refueling of (primarily) special operations helicopter and tilt-rotor aircraft.

The first of the variants, the MC-130E, was developed to support clandestine special operations missions during the Vietnam War. Eighteen were created by modifying C-130E transports, and four were lost through attrition, but the remainder served more than four decades after their initial modification. An update, the MC-130H Combat Talon II, was developed in the 1980s from the C-130H and went into service in the 1990s. Four of the original 24 H-series aircraft have been lost in operations.

The Combat Shadows were built during the Vietnam War for search and rescue operations and repurposed in the 1980s as AFSOC air-refueling tankers; the last of the 24 retired in 2015.

The Combat Spear was developed in 2006 as an inexpensive version of the Combat Talon II but was reconfigured and designated the AC-130W Stinger II in 2012.

The MC-130J, which became operational in 2011, is the new-production variant that is replacing the other special operations MC-130s. As of 2023, the Air Force has taken delivery of 57 MC-130J models. The final MC-130J produced was delivered to USAF in January 2025.

== MC-130E Combat Talon ==
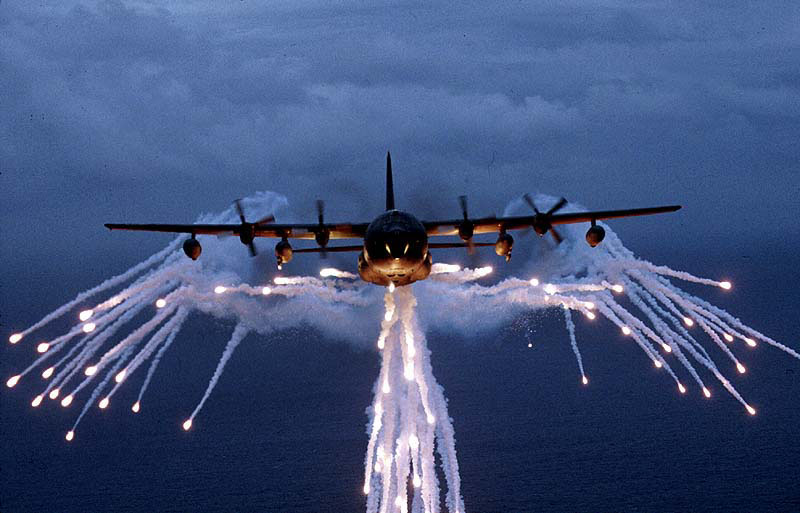
MC-130E Combat Talon dispensing flares

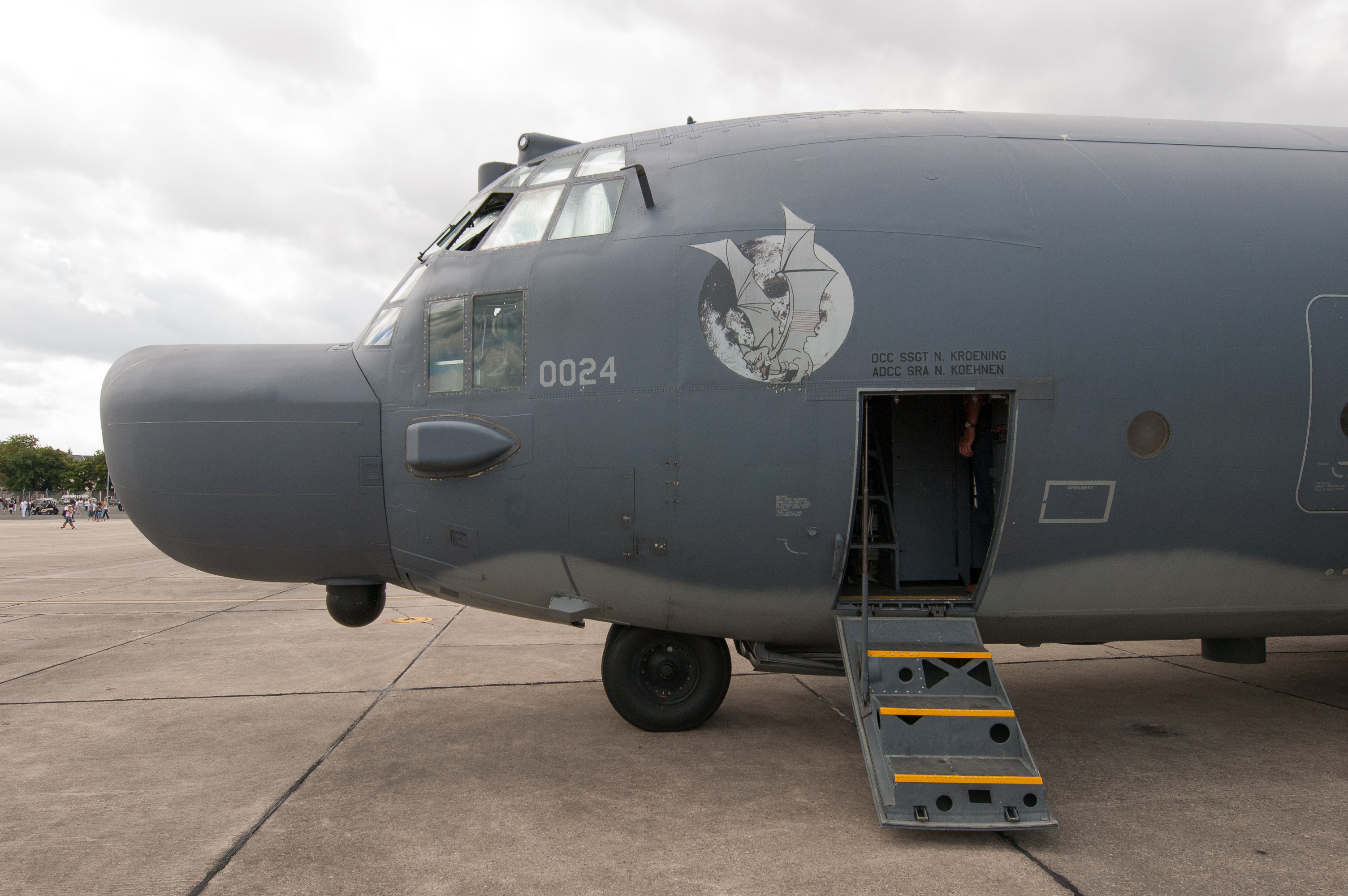
MC-130 nose

=== Development ===
The Combat Talon was developed between December 1964 and January 1967 by Lockheed Air Services (LAS) at Ontario, California, as the result of a study by Big Safari, the USAF's program office that modifies and sustains special mission aircraft. Two highly classified testbed aircraft (originally serial no. 64-0506 and -0507, but with all numbers "sanitized" from the aircraft), were assigned to Project Thin Slice to develop a low-level clandestine penetration aircraft for Special Forces operations in Southeast Asia. In 1964, Lockheed was ordered to adapt the C-130Es after six C-123B Providers modified for "unconventional warfare" under Project Duck Hook proved inadequate for the new MACV-SOG. The modifications under Thin Slice and its August 1966 successor Heavy Chain were code-named Rivet Yard, and the four C-130Es came to be known as "Yards". Discreet modification tests were conducted by the 1198th Operational Evaluation and Training Squadron, out of Area II of Norton AFB at San Bernardino, California, 30 miles east of Ontario.

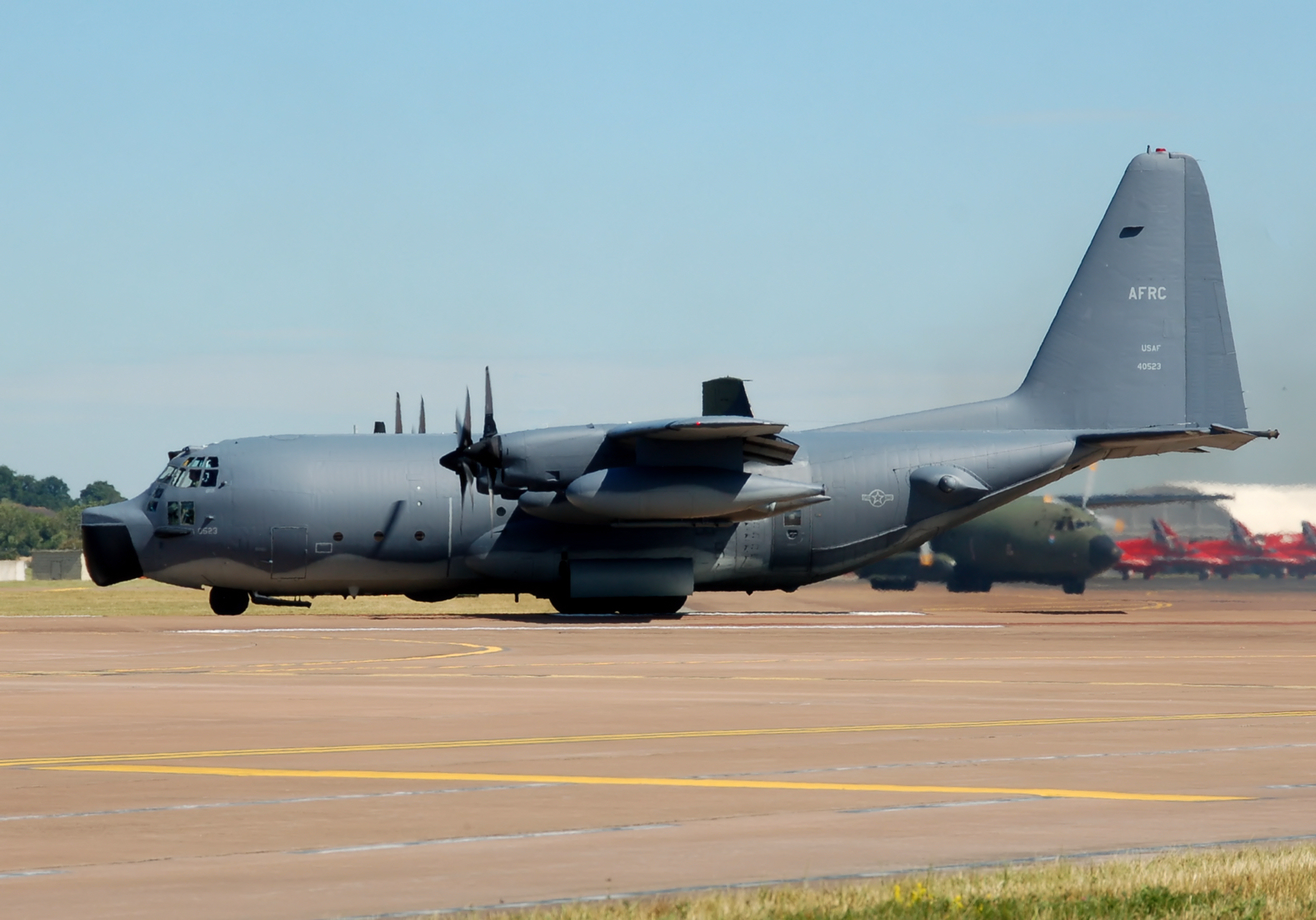
MC-130E Combat Talon I of the Air Force Reserve's 919th Special Operations Wing taxis to the runway at RIAT 2010

As the Thin Slice aircraft were being developed, 14 C-130Es were purchased for SOG in 1965 for similar modification. The first aircraft were production C-130Es without specialized equipment that were produced at Lockheed's facility in Marietta, Georgia. Three production airplanes per month were given the Fulton STARS (then ARS) system. While awaiting the ARS equipment, the C-130s were ferried to Greenville, Texas, for painting by Ling-Temco-Vought Electrosystems with a low-radar reflective paint that added 168 kg (370 lbs) to their weight. The velvet black-and-green scheme drew the nickname "Blackbirds". As installation was completed, the Blackbirds were returned to Ontario for installation of the electronics package, code-named Rivet Clamp. The modified aircraft became known as "Clamps" (two of the original 14, 64–0564 and -0565, were diverted to Heavy Chain in August 1966). The aircraft collectively were assigned the designation Combat Talon in 1967.

The Fulton surface-to-air recovery system was used to extract personnel and materials via air. A large helium balloon raised a nylon lift line into the air, which was snagged by a large scissors-shaped yoke attached to the nose of the plane. The yoke snagged the line and released the balloon, yanking the attached cargo off the ground with a shock less than that of an opening parachute. A sky anchor secured the line and wires stretched from the nose to both leading wing tip edges, protecting the propellers from the line on missed snag attempts. Crew members hooked the snagged line as it trailed behind and attached it to the hydraulic winch, pulling the attached person or cargo into the plane through the rear cargo door.

Following a death on 26 April 1982, at CFB Lahr, Germany, the Fulton STARS system on the Clamp aircraft underwent intense maintenance scrutiny and employment of the system for live pickups was suspended. A major effort at upgrading the system, Project 46, was pursued from 1986 to 1989, but at its conclusion, use of the STARS system for live extractions remained suspended. The Fulton STARS equipment of all Combat Talons was removed during 1998.

Rivet Clamp installation began with four STARS-equipped C-130s completed by March 1966, followed by installations in eight further aircraft in July 1966 and January 1967. The Rivet Clamps, originally designated C-130E(I)sp, were equipped with an electronic and infrared (IR) countermeasures suite; and the SPR2 later the AN/APQ-115 TF/TA multimode radar. This radar, adapted from the Texas Instruments AN/APQ-99 radar used in the RF-4C Phantom photo reconnaissance aircraft, featured terrain following/terrain-avoidance (TF/TA) and mapping radar modes, to enable it to operate at low altitudes at night and in all weather conditions and avoid known enemy radar and anti-aircraft weapons concentrations.

Beginning in 1970, Texas Instruments and Lockheed Air Service worked to adapt the existing AN/APQ-122 Adverse Weather Aerial Delivery System (AWADS) with terrain following/terrain avoidance modes to replace the original AN/APQ-115, which suffered throughout its life with an unacceptably adverse Mean-Time-Between-Failure (MTBF) rate. In 1970 they succeeded, and coupled the AN/APQ-122 with the Litton LN-15J Inertial Navigation System (INS). Known as MOD-70, the modified radar was installed in all 12 operational Combat Talons and the four Heavy Chain test beds between 1971 and 1973. The system proved so successful that it continued in service until the late 1980s. Following the completion of MOD-70, the Combat Talons were divided into three designations: C-130E(CT) for the "Clamp" aircraft, C-130E(Y) for the "Yank" (formerly "Yard") Talons, and C-130E(S) for the "Swap". The Combat Talon I designations were consolidated in 1977 as the MC-130 and have remained under that designation since. The Combat Talon became the Combat Talon I in 1984 with the authorization for the modification of 24 C-130Hs to Combat Talon II specifications.

The "Yank" Talons conducted top secret operations worldwide, under the project name Combat Sam, until late 1972. Two of the original "Clamps" were lost in combat in Southeast Asia and were replaced by two C-130Es (64-0571 and −0572). These remained as Combat Talons until 1972, when Heavy Chain was gradually discontinued and its four "Yank" aircraft were integrated into the Combat Talon force. The two original Thin Slice aircraft were given the serials of two destroyed C-130s, 62-1843 and 63-7785 respectively, to disguise their classified origins. The replacements had their modifications removed and returned to airlift duties, although known as "Swaps", they remained available for future Combat Talon use. Both eventually became Combat Talons again after further losses in the Combat Talon inventory.

Capability to act as a Forward Area Refueling Point (FARP) for helicopters on the ground was begun in 1980 in preparation for Operation Eagle Claw (see below), although only one system could be installed before the mission was executed. The refueling system consists of two palletized 6,800 L (1,800 gal) tanks (known as Benson tanks) mounted on rails within the Talon that tie into the C-130's own pressurized fuel dumping pumps and require no further equipment.

A major modification between 1986 and 1994, MOD-90, modernized the capability and serviceability of the Talon I to extend its service life. All 14 Combat Talon Is were equipped with upgraded navigational radars, an enhanced electronic warfare suite and provided new outer wings. By 1995 all Combat Talon Is were equipped with helicopter-air refueling pods.

=== Southeast Asia operations ===
The aircraft received for modification as Combat Talons were assigned in July 1965 to the 464th Troop Carrier Wing at Pope Air Force Base, North Carolina. Because of a lack of ramp space caused by the buildup of forces for deployment to South Vietnam, they were temporarily housed at Sewart Air Force Base, Tennessee. The wing's 779th TCS was designated as the training squadron for the modified C-130E(I)s, under Project Skyhook, in addition to its normal airlift function. Selected crew members received instructor training in their respective systems and returned to Pope by 1 May to begin crew training of six crews for deployment to Vietnam under Project Stray Goose.

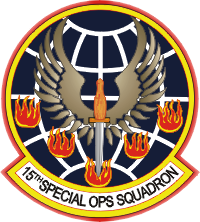
15th Special Operations Squadron

The Combat Talon I first saw operational action in the Vietnam War, beginning 1 September 1966. The six Stray Goose crews deployed to Ching Chuan Kang Air Base, Taiwan, and forward deployed to Nha Trang Air Base, South Vietnam. The deployment, known as Combat Spear, preceded operational deployment of other Combat Talons to Europe (Combat Arrow) and the United States (Combat Knife).

Combat Spear was administratively assigned as Detachment 1, 314th Troop Carrier Wing, but was operationally controlled by MACV-SOG. On 9 October 2009, Detachment 1, 314th Troop Carrier Wing received the Presidential Unit Citation (PUC) for its support of MACV-SOG activities. Chief of Staff of the Air Force General Norton A. Schwartz presented the award to the unit during a ceremony at Hurlburt Field, culminating a six-year campaign by former Stray Goose member Richard H. Sell to achieve the recognition after the unit was not included in a PUC awarded 4 April 2001, to MACV-SOG for the same period.

On 15 March 1968, the detachment was designated the 15th Air Commando Squadron, and then the 15th Special Operations Squadron on 1 August 1968, and made part of the 14th Special Operations Wing. In Vietnam, the aircraft was used to drop leaflets over North Vietnamese positions, and to insert and resupply special forces and indigenous units into hostile territory throughout Southeast Asia. Combat Talon crews operated unescorted at low altitudes and at night.

By 1970 twelve Combat Talons were operational in three units of four aircraft each:

- 7th Special Operations Squadron (SOS), Ramstein Air Base, Germany;
- 15th Special Operations Squadron, Nha Trang Air Base, South Vietnam; and
- Detachment 2, 1st Special Operations Wing, Pope Air Force Base, North Carolina, (redesignated 318th SOS in 1971 and 8th SOS in 1974).

The 15th SOS was redesignated the 90th SOS on 23 October 1970, relocated to Cam Ranh Bay Air Base, then moved to Kadena Air Base, Okinawa, in April 1972 as part of the drawdown of U.S. forces in Vietnam. It was again redesignated, becoming the 1st SOS on 15 December 1972, and began transition from the "Clamp" to the "Yank" variant.

==== Kingpin ====
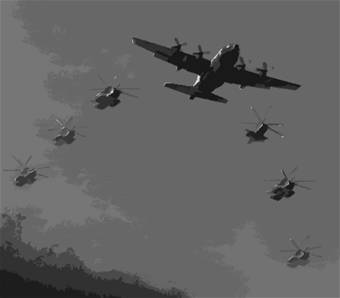
Mixed formation of helicopters and Combat Talon of the Son Tay rescue operation during a practice mission

Two Combat Talons were employed as navigation escorts and for airborne control during Operation Kingpin, the operational phase of the attempted rescue of prisoners of war from Son Tay prison camp in North Vietnam on 21 November 1970. 64-0523 was drawn from the 15th SOS at Nha Trang and 64-0558 from Det. 2, 1st SOW at Pope AFB. The aircraft were modified at LAS Ontario with installation of FL-2B FLIR sets borrowed from the Heavy Chain project to compensate for difficulties in terrain-following created by the slow speeds necessitated by the mixed aircraft force.

24 primary and five backup crew personnel, all Stray Goose/Combat Spear veterans detached from 7th SOS (Combat Arrow) and 1st SOW (Combat Knife), developed helicopter-fixed wing formation procedures for low level night missions and jointly trained with selected Special Forces volunteers at Eglin Air Force Base, Florida. Between the end of August and 28 September 1970, Talon, helicopter, and A-1 Skyraider crews supervised by Combat Talon Program Manager Lt. Col. Benjamin N. Kraljev rehearsed the flight profile in terrain-following missions over southern Alabama, flying 368 sorties that totalled more than 1,000 hours. A month of intensive joint training with the Special Forces rescue force followed at a replica of the prison camp.

In early November the task force deployed to Takhli Royal Thai Air Force Base, Thailand. The 24 primary crew members, a 7th SOS crew (Cherry 01) under Major Irl L. "Leon" Franklin and a 1st SOW crew (Cherry 02) commanded by Lt Col Albert P. "Friday" Blosch, conducted the mission, which was successfully executed without loss of any personnel. However the operation failed when the prison was found not to contain any prisoners.

=== Post-Vietnam developments ===
In 1974 the Combat Talon program was nearly dismantled as the Air Force sought to reverse its Vietnam emphasis on special operations. The 1st Special Operations Wing was redesignated the 834th Tactical Composite Wing and its Combat Talons of the 8th SOS became a TAC asset. However the use of 1st SOS "Yank" Talons in a sea surveillance role off North Korea in 1975 revived interest in the Combat Talon, as did the Israeli hostage rescue at Entebbe Airport. The same year, a Combat Talon of the 1st Special Operations Wing was deployed in support of US Marines forces on Koh Tang island during the Mayaguez incident, dropping a single BLU-82 6,800 kg (15,000 lb) bomb to enable their extraction. However, as late as 1978–79, Air Force Special Operations Forces was still disregarded by many staff planners, who saw it as a drain on resources and not a force enabler, and wanted the entire Talon force transferred to the Air National Guard. In early 1977 the Combat Talon was redesignated MC-130E by Headquarters Air Force for all three variants of the aircraft.

By November 1979, the Combat Talon force of 14 MC-130Es was divided among three squadrons, the first two of which were operationally deployed, and the third at Hurlburt essentially the force training squadron:

- 1st Special Operations Squadron, Kadena Air Base, Okinawa – (four MC-130 Yanks);
- 7th Special Operations Squadron, Ramstein Air Base, Germany – (four MC-130 Clamps); and
- 8th Special Operations Squadron, Hurlburt Field, Florida – (six MC-130 Clamps).

==== Eagle Claw ====
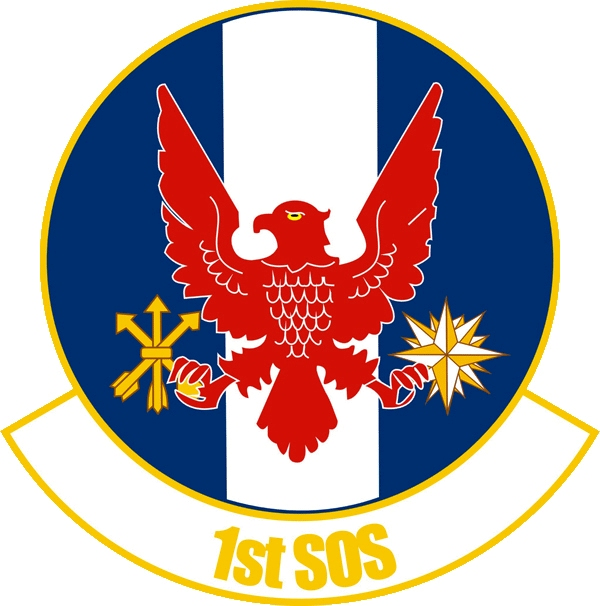
1st Special Operations Squadron

Following the seizure of the U.S. embassy in Tehran, Iran, on 4 November 1979, training operations for a rescue mission of the 53 hostages began as early as 7 November by Talon crews at Kadena AB, and 26 November by crews at Hurlburt. At that time only seven Combat Talons had the in-flight refueling capability necessary for the mission, which was to be mounted out of either Egypt or Diego Garcia (Masirah Island did not become available as a base until April 1980). All were assigned to the operation, a complex two-night plan called Eagle Claw. Talon crews using night vision goggles practiced blacked-out landings to insert Delta Force operators and U.S. Army Rangers deep into Iran, and developed several methods for delivering extra fuel for the US Navy RH-53D Sea Stallion helicopters chosen to carry out the rescued hostages. Four transcontinental, all-component, two-night rehearsals were held between December 1979 and March 1980, including a full-scale rehearsal 25–26 March that involved every element of the final plan except three EC-130s chosen to fly in fuel for the helicopters.

The four Talons (including a spare) of the 1st SOS staged to Masirah Island off the coast of Oman on 19 April 1980, to lead the Night One infiltration phase, while the three of the 8th SOS deployed to Wadi Qena, Egypt, on 21 April to lead the Night Two exfiltration phase. To establish a "normal" C-130 presence in Egypt, Talons of the 7th SOS (none of which had aerial refueling capability) conducted regular flights using Military Airlift Command call signs in and out of Wadi Qena between 2 January and 8 April 1980. They also used the deception to discreetly pre-position needed equipment, including ammunition for AC-130 gunships, at the staging base. The Talon crews also manned three borrowed EC-130E ABCCC aircraft configured to carry 68,100 L (18,000 U.S. gal) of jet fuel in six collapsible bladders for refueling the helicopters. After returning to Masirah, three of the 8th SOS Night One crews would be flown to Wadi Qena to carry out the Night Two mission.

The first phase of the rescue mission began the evening of 24 April, led by Lt Col Robert L. Brenci of the 8th SOS in Talon 64-0565, Dragon 1. The 1st SOS Talons successfully secured the forward operating location ("Desert One") in the Iranian Desert, but the helicopter portion of the mission ended in disaster. Although the mission was an embarrassing failure costing eight lives, seven helicopters, and an EC-130E aircraft in a ground accident, the MC-130s performed nearly flawlessly. Planning initiatives for a second rescue attempt, under the project name Honey Badger, began two weeks after the failed raid and continued through November. Combat Talon participation in Honey Badger amounted largely to tactics development, but ECM improvements included chaff and flare dispensers and new ALR-69 threat receivers that improved its defensive countermeasures capability well beyond that existing prior to Eagle Claw.

==== Urgent Fury ====
8th Special Operations Squadron

Five Combat Talons of the 8th Special Operations Squadron participated in Operation Urgent Fury, the United States invasion of Grenada between 25 and 31 October 1983. Unlike previous operations that involved months of planning, training, and reconnaissance, the 8th SOS prepared in less than 72 hours after being alerted. Its assignment was to insert Rangers of the 1st and 2nd Ranger Battalions at night to capture Point Salines International Airport, defended by both Cuban and Grenadan troops, in the opening moments of the operation. The five Talons divided into three elements, two of them leading formations of Special Operations Low Level-equipped (SOLL) C-130 transports.

In clouds at 500 ft (150 m) above the sea and 20 mi (32 km) west of its objective, the lead Talon (64-0562) experienced a complete failure of its APQ-122 radar. Reorganization of the mission formations delayed the operation for 30 minutes, during which U.S. Marines made their amphibious landing. To compound the lack of surprise, the U.S. Department of State, apparently in a good faith but inept diplomatic gesture, contacted Cuban authorities and compromised the mission, further alerting the defenses, including a dozen ZU-23-2 antiaircraft guns. An AC-130 Spectre gunship, directed to observe the main runway for obstructions, reported it blocked by construction equipment and barricades. Loadmasters aboard the inbound Combat Talons reconfigured them for a parachute drop in less than thirty minutes.

Talon 64-0568, flown as Foxtrot 35 by 8th SOS commander Lt Col James L. Hobson and with the commander of the Twenty-Third Air Force, Maj Gen William J. Mall, Jr., aboard as a passenger, combat-dropped runway clearing teams from the Ranger Battalions on the airport, despite being targeted by a searchlight and under heavy AAA fire. Two Spectre gunships suppressed the AAA so that the other Combat Talons and the SOLL C-130s could complete the parachute drop of the Rangers, with the only damage to the Talons being three hits by small arms fire to 64–0572. For his actions, Hobson was awarded the MacKay Trophy in 1984.

=== Other Combat Talon operations ===
==== Just Cause ====
1st SOW

Talons supported Operation Just Cause, the United States invasion of Panama in December 1989 and January 1990. Three MC-130Es of the 1st Special Operations Wing deployed to Hunter Army Air Field, Georgia within 48 hours of being alerted, then airlanded Rangers of the 2nd Battalion 75th Ranger Regiment into Rio Hato Military Airfield on 18 December 1989. The operation was conducted under total blackout conditions, using Night Vision Goggles (NVGs), 35 minutes after the opening parachute assault. One of the MC-130s had an engine disabled by a ground obstruction while taxiing, then made an NVG takeoff on three engines under intense ground fire, earning its pilot the Distinguished Flying Cross. The lead Talon, the only MC-130E equipped with the Benson tank refueling system, remained on the airfield as a FARP for U.S. Army OH-6 helicopters. When Panamanian General Manuel Noriega surrendered on 3 January, he was immediately flown to Homestead Air Force Base, Florida, by a Combat Talon.

==== Desert Storm ====
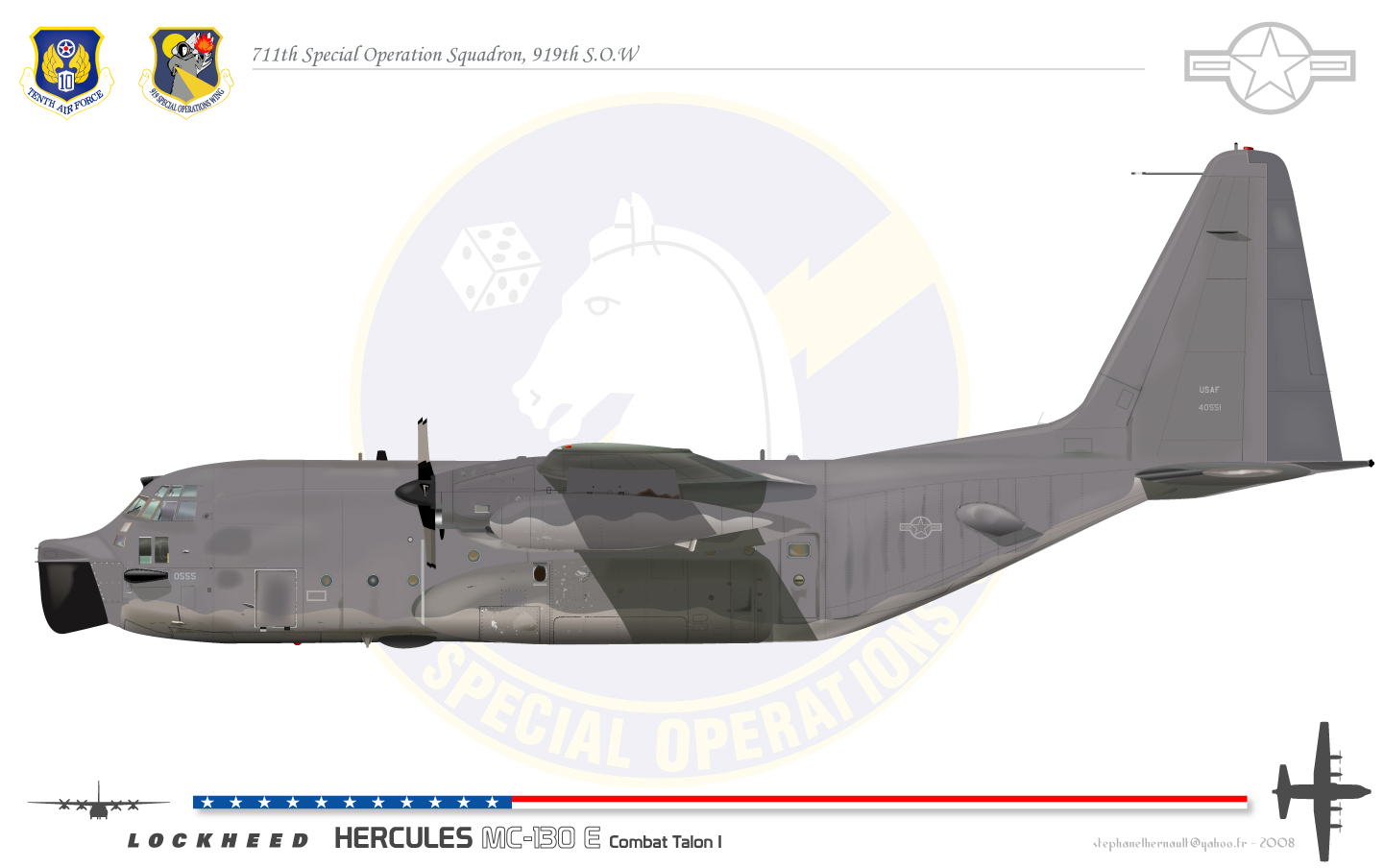
MC-130E Combat Talon I of 711th SOS, 1996–present

The 1990 invasion of Kuwait by Iraq resulted in the deployment of four Combat Talons and six crews of the 8th SOS in August 1990 to King Fahd International Airport in Saudi Arabia as a component of Operation Desert Shield. During Operation Desert Storm, the combat phase of the Gulf War in January and February 1991, the Combat Talon performed one-third of all airdrops during the campaign, and participated in psychological operations, flying 15 leaflet-drop missions before and throughout the war. Combat Talon crews also conducted five BLU-82B "Daisy Cutter" missions during the two weeks preceding the onset of the ground campaign, dropping 11 bombs on Iraqi positions at night from altitudes between 16,000 ft (4,900 m) and 21,000 ft (6,400 m), once in concert with a bombardment by the battleship USS Wisconsin.

Two 7th SOS Talons deployed to Incirlik Air Base, Turkey, as part of Operation Proven Force. They supported the first Joint Search and Rescue mission over Iraq, attempting to recover the crew of Corvette 03, a downed F-15E Strike Eagle. However permission from the Turkish government to fly the mission was delayed for 24 hours, and the crew was not recovered.

=== Air Force Reserve Command ===
On 6 October 1995, the Air Force began shifting the Combat Talon I force with the transfer of MC-130E, AF Ser. No. 64-0571, to the Air Force Reserve Command's 919th Special Operations Wing, 711th Special Operations Squadron, based at Duke Field (Eglin AFB Auxiliary Field # 3), Florida. The 919th had previously flown the AC-130A Spectre in the gunship / close air support mission, and the increasing age of the AC-130A aircraft necessitated their retirement.

Six MC-130E aircraft went to the 711th SOS over the next year for crew training, and the squadron became operational on 1 March 1997. On 5 March 1999, the 8th Special Operations Squadron became the first active force squadron to become an Associate Unit to an Air Reserve Component organization, co-located with the 711th SOS, but without aircraft of its own, flying those of the reserve unit. Ten of the Combat Talon Is were Primary Assigned Aircraft (PAA), two were assigned to crew training, and two were placed in Backup Inventory Aircraft (BIA) storage.

A Combat Talon I was the first aircraft to land at New Orleans International Airport after Hurricane Katrina in August 2005. On 14 July 2006, the 8th SOS flew its last Combat Talon I mission and began conversion to the CV-22 Osprey, ending 41 years of active service for the MC-130E Combat Talon I. Although retired from the Regular Air Force, an MC-130E continued to remain in service with the Air Force Reserve Command's 919th Special Operations Wing until 2012.

=== Retirement ===
The MC-130E Combat Talon I has been replaced by the MC-130J Commando II, which has the capability to complete missions faster and more efficiently than its MC-130H Combat Talon II and MC-130P Combat Shadow counterparts. Recapitalization was a stated priority of Lt Gen Donald C. Wurster, former commander of Air Force Special Operations Command. Only eight MC-130E aircraft were still active in 2009, and four in 2013. On 15 April 2013, the four MC-130Es took off on their final mission. The MC-130E Combat Talon I was finally retired on 25 April 2013 in ceremonies at Duke Field. Three of the aircraft were then flown to the 309th Aerospace Maintenance and Regeneration Group at Davis-Monthan AFB, Arizona, while the fourth aircraft, AF Ser. No. 64-0523 (nicknamed "Godfather") was flown to Cannon AFB, New Mexico on 22 June 2012, for eventual display at that base's airpark. The retirement date marked the 33rd anniversary of the Desert One, the mission to free American hostages in Iran, of which several MC-130Es were a part.

== MC-130H Combat Talon II ==
=== Combat Talon II Development ===
==== Credible Sport ====
One of the measures considered for a second hostage rescue attempt in Iran was a project to develop a "Super STOL" aircraft, to be flown by Combat Talon crews, that would use a soccer stadium near the US Embassy as an improvised landing field. Called Credible Sport, the project acquired three C-130H transports from an airlift unit in late August 1980, one as a test bed and two for the mission, and quickly modified them.

Designated the XFC-130H, the aircraft were fitted with 30 maneuvering rockets in five sets: eight firing forward to stop the aircraft, eight downward to slow its descent, eight rearward for takeoff assist, four on the wings to stabilize them during takeoff transition, and two at the rear of the tail to prevent it from striking the ground because of over-rotation. Other STOL features included a dorsal and two ventral fins on the rear fuselage, double-slotted flaps and extended ailerons, a new radome, a tailhook for landing aboard an aircraft carrier, and Combat Talon avionics, including a TF/TA radar, a defensive countermeasures suite, and a Doppler radar/GPS tie-in to the aircraft's inertial navigation system.

Of the three aircraft, only one received full modification. The program abruptly ended when one crashed during testing on 29 October 1980; international events soon rendered another rescue attempt moot.

==== Testing and delivery ====
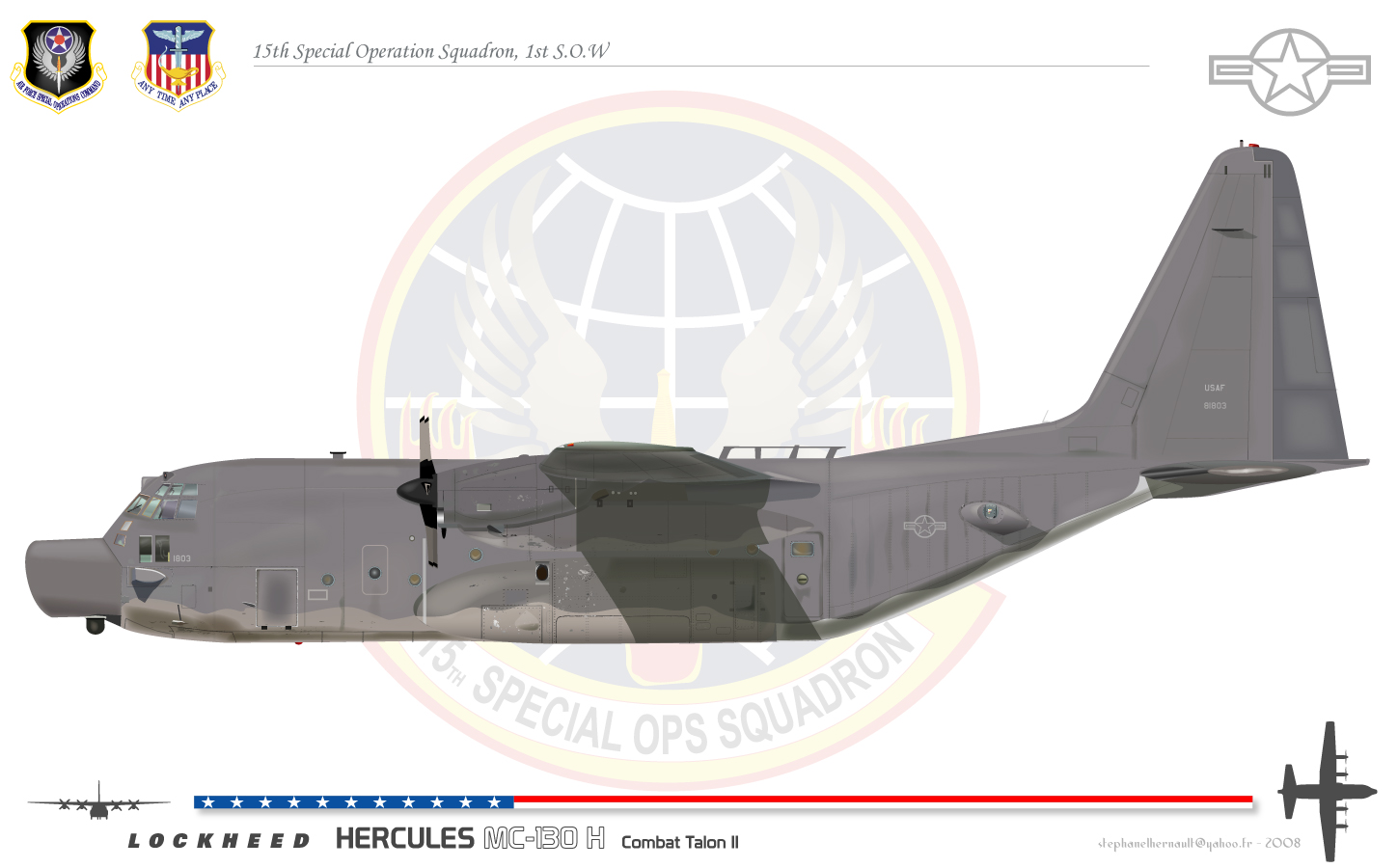
MC-130H Combat Talon II of 15th SOS

One of the two surviving Credible Sport airframes, 74-1686, became the YMC-130H test bed for the next generation of Combat Talons, under the project name Credible Sport II. Phase I testing, conducted between 24 August and 11 November 1981, identified design deficiencies in the airframe and determined that the Credible Sport configuration did not have the safety margins necessary for peacetime operations. Phase II testing began 15 June 1982, continued through October 1982, and determined that the final Combat Talon II configuration, with significant improvements in design, avionics, and equipment, was ready for production.

The initial purchase was authorized in 1982 at 12 aircraft, even though war-fighting requirements were estimated at more than 100, but was cut from funding until 1984. In 1983, USAF Special Operations Forces were transferred to the Military Airlift Command, seen as another move by USAF to divest itself of its special operations role. Creation of the 23rd Air Force reinforced that perception; SOF represented less than 35% of its personnel and virtually none of its headquarters staff, dominated by the "rescue community". However, the moves did remove the Combat Talon program from three fighter-oriented commands to a single command where promotion cycles were more favorable.

In 1983, MAC established a Special Operations Force Master Plan that called for 21 Combat Talon IIs, including two attrition backups, with initial operational capability in the third quarter of 1987 and full delivery by 1991. The first Combat Talon II, 83-1212, was delivered in June 1984, but an earlier decision by USAF not to equip it with the navigational radar suite of the MC-130E slowed its development for years. In the meantime, Initiative 17, part of the "31 Initiatives" agreement between the Army and Air Force in May 1984, was deferred later that year (and eventually killed) after objections from members of Congress who saw it as a divestiture of the SOF role by the Air Force. As a result, the Air Force cut procurement of new HH-60D Nighthawk combat rescue aircraft from its budget requests—further delaying the Combat Talon II program, whose glass cockpit and integrated avionics systems were tied, for cost reasons, to those of the HH-60D.

Five Combat Talon IIs were delivered in 1985 but the problem of acquiring a navigation radar had not been resolved (the APQ-122 was no longer being built). IBM was contracted to develop a new terrain following/avoidance radar, who then subcontracted the task to Emerson Electric Company. The resulting radar performed so poorly that the Combat Talon II was nearly cancelled, but special operations advocates in Congress kept the program alive. Ultimately the AN/APQ-170(V)8 radar was developed into a system that exceeded specifications, but at a large cost overrun and with a further three-year delay in the Combat Talon II becoming operational. Deliveries in 1987, 1988, and 1989 brought the inventory to 18 aircraft, but all were still in modification, testing, or long term storage.

=== Operations 1993–2000 ===
The first fully operational MC-130H Combat Talon II (87-0024) was received by the 8th SOS on 29 June 1991, with three others delivered over the summer. The official acceptance ceremony for the Talon II was held at Hurlburt in October, and by December 1991 the 8th SOS was equipped with six. The Combat Talon II features a stronger airframe and modifications to the rear and aft cargo doors. The electronics suite has been upgraded, and includes Global Positioning System navigation, special radars for navigating in adverse weather, and night vision goggles (NVG) capability. These new technologies allow the Combat Talon II to fly as low as 250 feet (76 m) above ground level (AGL) in inclement weather, and make faster, more accurate airdrops. The MC-130H Combat Talon II, like the MC-130E Combat Talon I, can perform a variety of mission profiles, from daytime mid-level overwater flight and Jumpmaster Directed (JMD) personnel airdrop to night-time adverse weather terrain-following flight in mountainous terrain supporting airdrop and airland to covert and clandestine objectives. Increases in automation reduced the aircrew by two and allowed the Combat Talon II to carry an additional pallet of cargo when compared to the Combat Talon I. Initial Operational capability was reached on 30 June 1993.

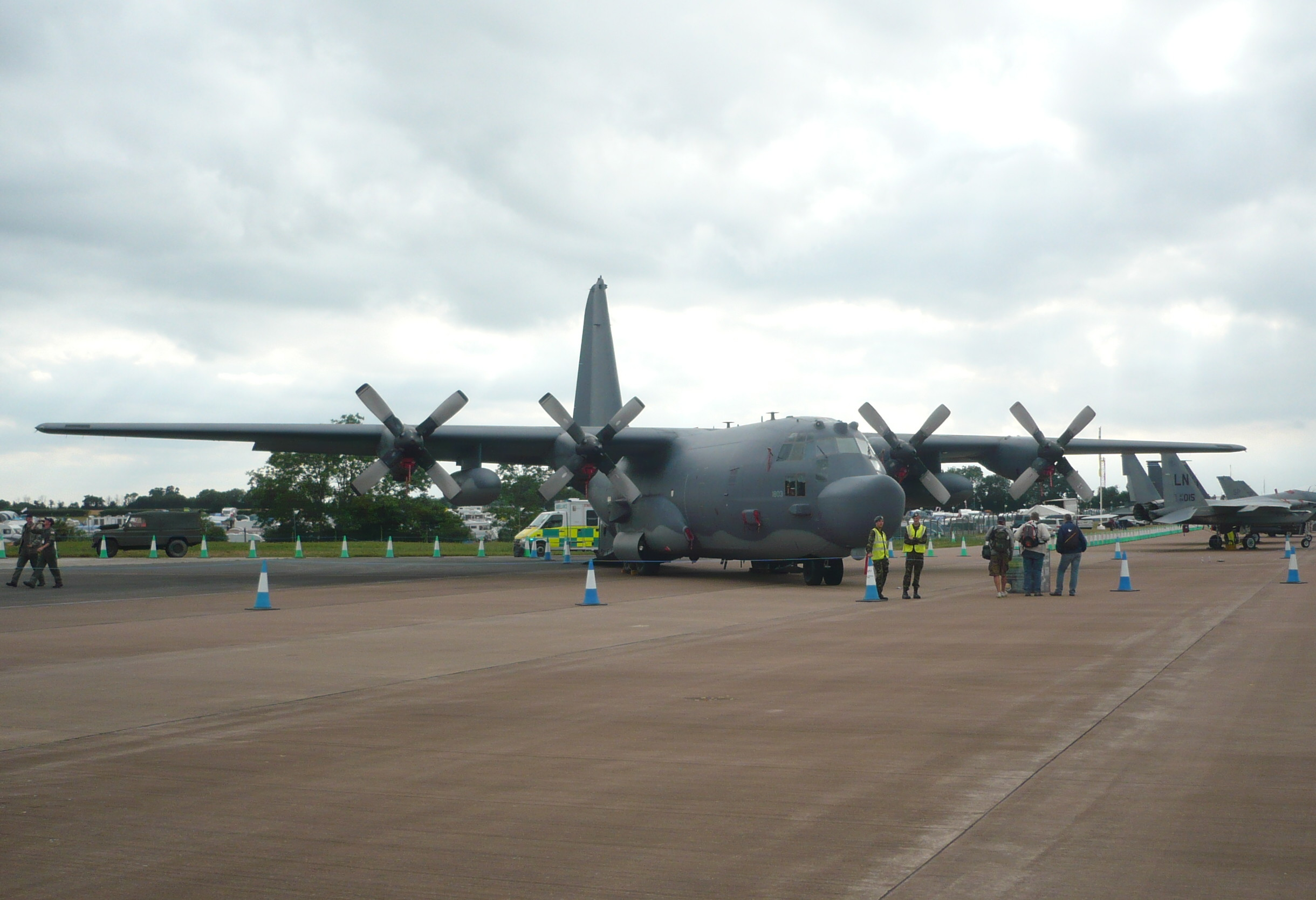
MC-130H Reg.88-1803 at RIAT 2010

Three MC-130H Combat Talon IIs of the 7th SOS were deployed in December 1995 to deliver peacekeeping forces to Tuzla and Sarajevo, Bosnia and Herzegovina, as part of Operation Joint Endeavor, during which one Talon was hit by ground fire. The first combat deployment of a Combat Talon II was on 8 April 1996, during Operation Assured Response. Special operations forces were deployed to Liberia to assist in the evacuation of 2000 civilians from the American embassy when the country broke down into civil war. However orders to combat drop an 18-man SEAL team off Monrovia were rescinded and the mission landed in Sierra Leone. Similar circumstances brought the Combat Talon II to Zaire in 1997.

Talon II deployments for joint exercises in 1997 included Australia, Guam, Indonesia, South Korea, and Thailand. In July 1997, three Talon IIs deployed to Thailand as part of Operation Bevel Edge, a proposed rescue of 1000 American citizens trapped in Phnom Penh, Cambodia, by a possible civil war, but the crisis ended when the Cambodian government allowed all non-citizens who desired so to leave by commercial air. A 7th SOS Combat Talon II aircrew, Whiskey 05, earned the Mackay Trophy for an embassy evacuation mission in the Republic of the Congo in June 1997. The crew rescued thirty Americans and twenty-six foreign nationals, and logged twenty-one hours of flight time.

Full Operational Capability for the Talon II was reached in February 2000. At that time 24 MC-130Hs were deployed to four squadrons:

- 15th Special Operations Squadron, eleven at Hurlburt Field, Florida;
- 1st Special Operations Squadron, five at Kadena AB, Okinawa;
- 7th Special Operations Squadron, five at RAF Mildenhall, U.K.; and
- 550th Special Operations Squadron, three at Kirtland AFB, New Mexico.

=== Operations in Southwest Asia ===
==== Afghanistan ====
On the night of 19–20 October 2001, four Combat Talon IIs infiltrated a task force of 199 Rangers of the 3rd Battalion 75th Ranger Regiment and tactical PSYOP teams 658 miles inside Taliban-held Afghanistan. The force dropped onto Objective Rhino (30°29′12″N 064°31′32″E), an unused airfield in Kandahar Province 110 mi (180 km) southwest of Kandahar, to secure a landing zone as a temporary operating base for Special Forces units conducting raids in the vicinity.

A month later, two MC-130Hs, flying from Masirah Island, inserted a platoon of U.S. Navy SEAL Team Three and four Humvee vehicles to within ten miles of the same airfield on the night of 20–21 November. The SEAL platoon was inserted to establish an observation post at the airstrip, then assist two USAF combat controllers inserted by military free fall in preparing a landing zone for the 15th Marine Expeditionary Unit. The 15th MEU landed in CH-53 helicopters on 25 November 2001, and established Camp Rhino, the first forward operating base in Afghanistan for United States forces.

Combat Talon IIs of the 7th SOS, augmented by crews from the 15th and 550th SOSs, flew 13- to 15-hour airdrop and airlanding night resupply missions from Incirlik Air Base, Turkey, to Special Forces Operational Detachments-Alpha (ODAs) in Afghanistan during the opening phase of Operation Enduring Freedom in December 2001. Operating in mountainous terrain, they innovated an airdrop tactic by replicating maximum-effort landing techniques to rapidly descend from 10,000 ft (3,000 m) to 500 ft (150 m) AGL to ensure accurate gravity drops after clearing high ridgelines into deep valleys.

==== Iraq ====
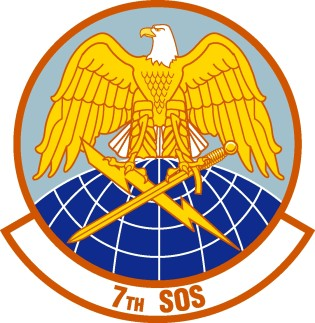
7th Special Operations Squadron

The 7th SOS, commanded by Lt Col Mark B. Alsid and part of the 352d Special Operations Group, received the Gallant Unit Citation in 2006 for operations conducted during Operation Iraqi Freedom between 12 February and 12 May 2003. The 7th SOS was tasked to Joint Special Operations Task Force – North, known as Task Force Viking, whose objective was to hold 13 Iraqi Army divisions along the "Green Line" in northeastern Iraq to prevent those divisions from reinforcing other Iraqi operations against United States forces invading from Kuwait. Forward-based at Constanţa, Romania, its primary mission was to infiltrate the 2nd and 3rd Battalions of the Army's 10th Special Forces Group and the 3rd Battalion of the 3rd Special Forces Group into Kurdish-held territory in preparation for Operation Northern Delay. Denied permission by Turkey to fly into Iraq from its airspace, the 7th SOS flew the first 280 troops on a circuitous path around Turkey to a base in Jordan on 20–21 March 2003.

On 22 March, six Combat Talon IIs (four from the 7th SOS) infiltrated 16 ODAs, four ODBs, battalion command elements, and Air Force Combat Control Teams to complete the fifteen-hour mission, the longest in U.S. Special Operations history. The insertion profile consisted of a four and one-half-hour low level flight at night through western and northern Iraq to Bashur and Sulaymaniyah airfields, often taking heavy ground fire from the integrated air defenses. The Talon IIs, at emergency gross weight limits, operated blacked-out, employed chaff and electronic countermeasures, flew as low as 100 ft (30 m) AGL, and carried their troops tethered to the floor of the cargo holds. Three of the Talons were battle-damaged, with one forced to seek permission to land at Incirlik Air Base. The operation became known informally as "Operation Ugly Baby". Major Jason L. Hanover was individually honored for commanding a mission that seized two austere airstrips during the operation. After airlanding their troops, the Talon IIs then had to fly back through the alerted defenses to recover to their launching point.

Overflight permission was granted by Turkey on 23 March, and the Combat Talon IIs delivered a total of 50 ODAs into Iraq. The Talon IIs then resupplied Task Force Viking, assisted in operations to capture Kirkuk and Mosul, airlanded supplies at remote outposts using Internal Airlift Slingable Container Units (ISUs), and acted as pathfinders for conventional C-130 airlift missions.

=== MC-130H retirement ===
On April 2, 2023, the United States Air Force retired its last MC-130H Combat Talon II, tail number 89-0280, after delivering the aircraft to the "Boneyard" at Davis-Monthan Air Force Base in Arizona. The retirement of the aircraft was witnessed by members of the Talon community, including former crew members and their families, who gathered at Hurlburt Field to see the plane take off for the last time.

The MC-130H was a special operations aircraft that had been in service for more than three decades, performing a variety of missions including infiltration, exfiltration, resupply of special operations forces and equipment, and air refueling operations. The aircraft had played a vital role in AFSOC operations since its arrival in Hurlburt Field in 1992. Its highlights included evacuations of non-combatant Americans and other civilians from conflicts in Liberia in 1996 and the Republic of Congo in 1997. It also participated in combat operations in the Balkans during Operation Allied Force and was used extensively in combat and humanitarian operations worldwide, including operations Enduring Freedom and Inherent Resolve, Resolute Support, Tomodachi in Japan, Unified Response in Haiti, and Sahayogi Haat in Nepal.

The MC-130H was replaced by the MC-130J Commando II. Lt. Gen. Tony Bauernfeind, commander of Air Force Special Operations Command, a former commander of the 15th SOS and MC-130H pilot, was on board the aircraft to help deliver it to its final destination and made it a priority to take part in the final flight. After the six-hour flight to Davis-Monthan, the aircrew, including Bauernfeind and 15th SOS Commander Lt. Col. Adam Schmidt, took photos with the aircraft and signed their names on the aircraft's nose.

== MC-130P Combat Shadow ==
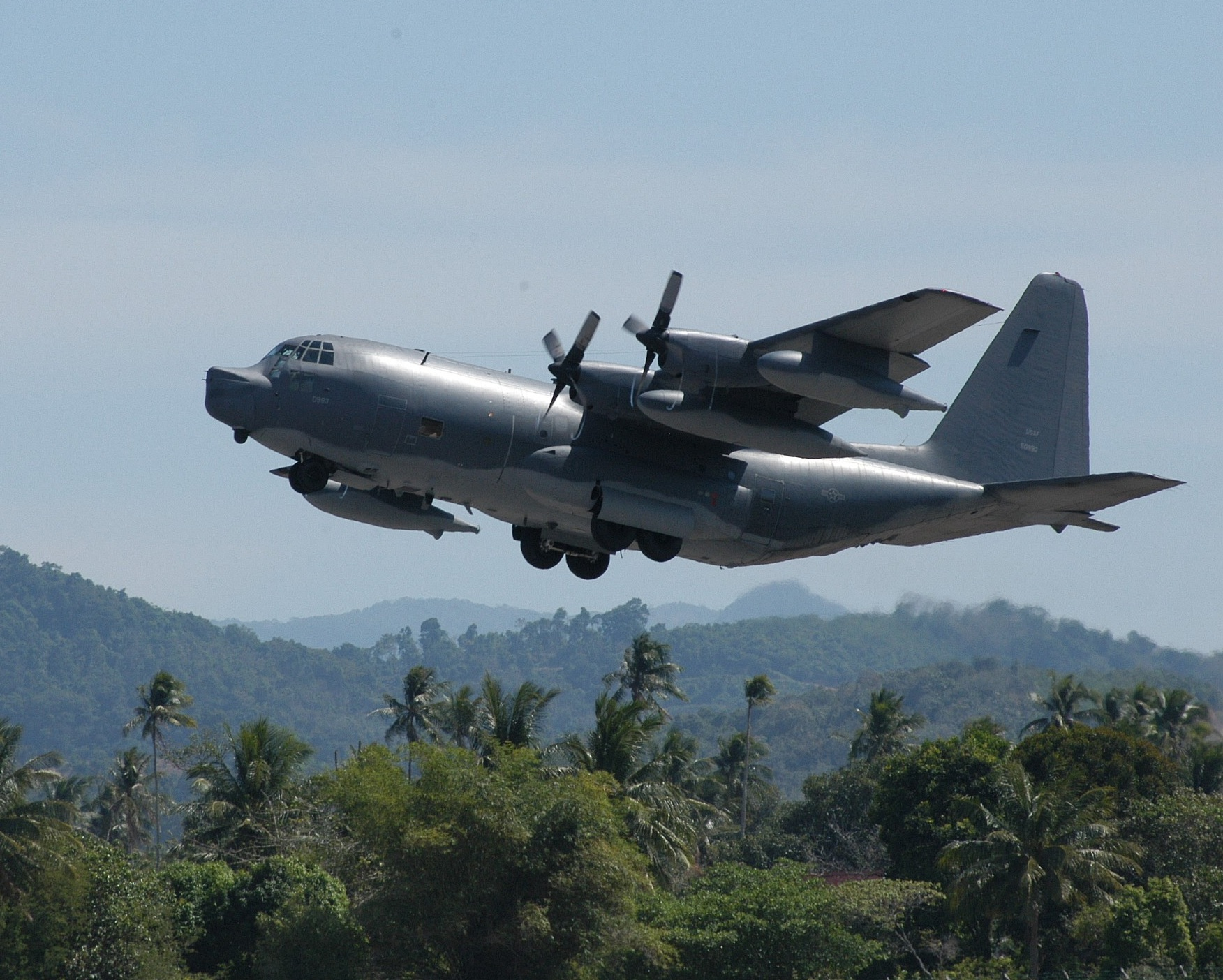
MC-130P Combat Shadow, 17th Special Operations Squadron

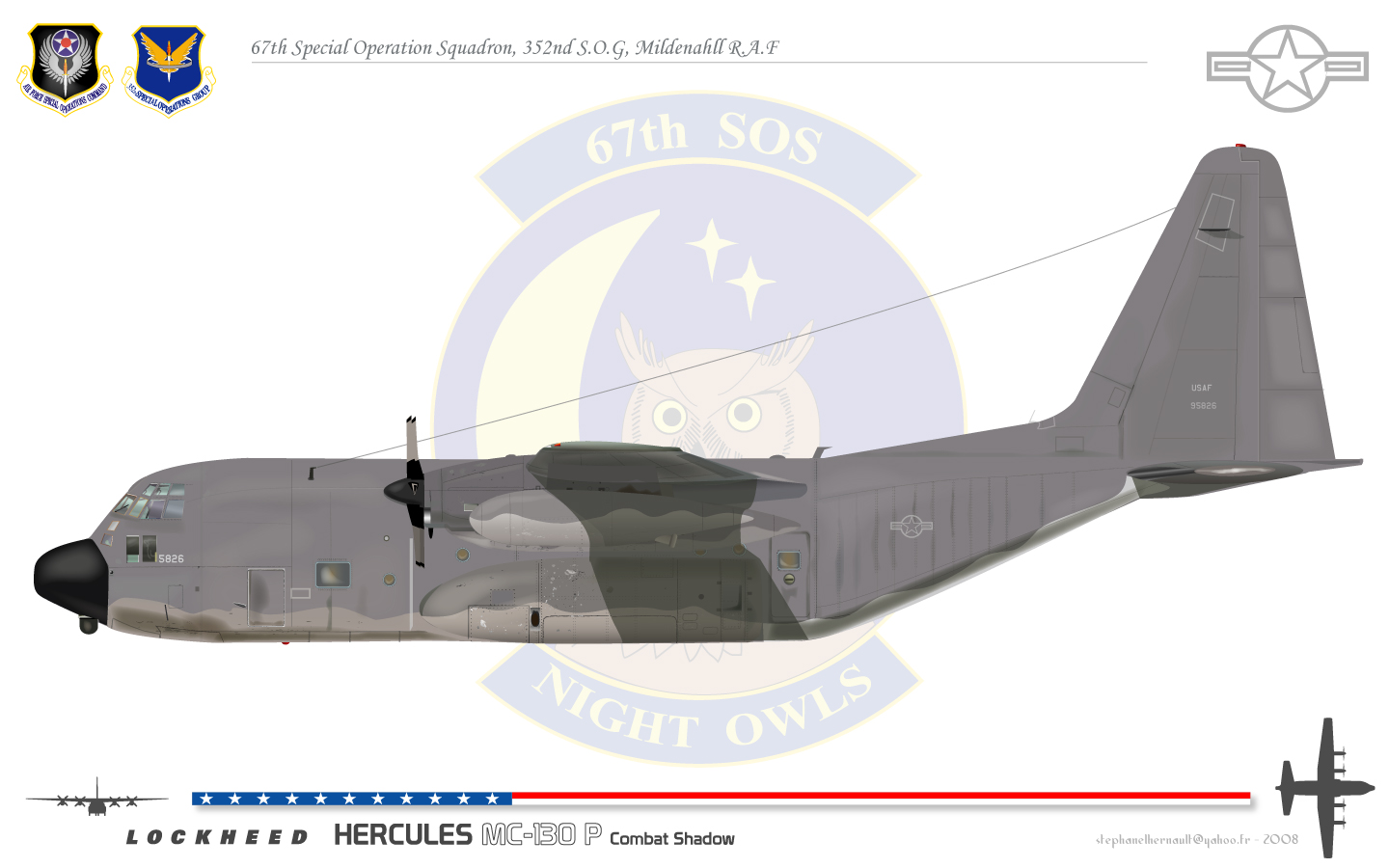
MC-130P Combat Shadow

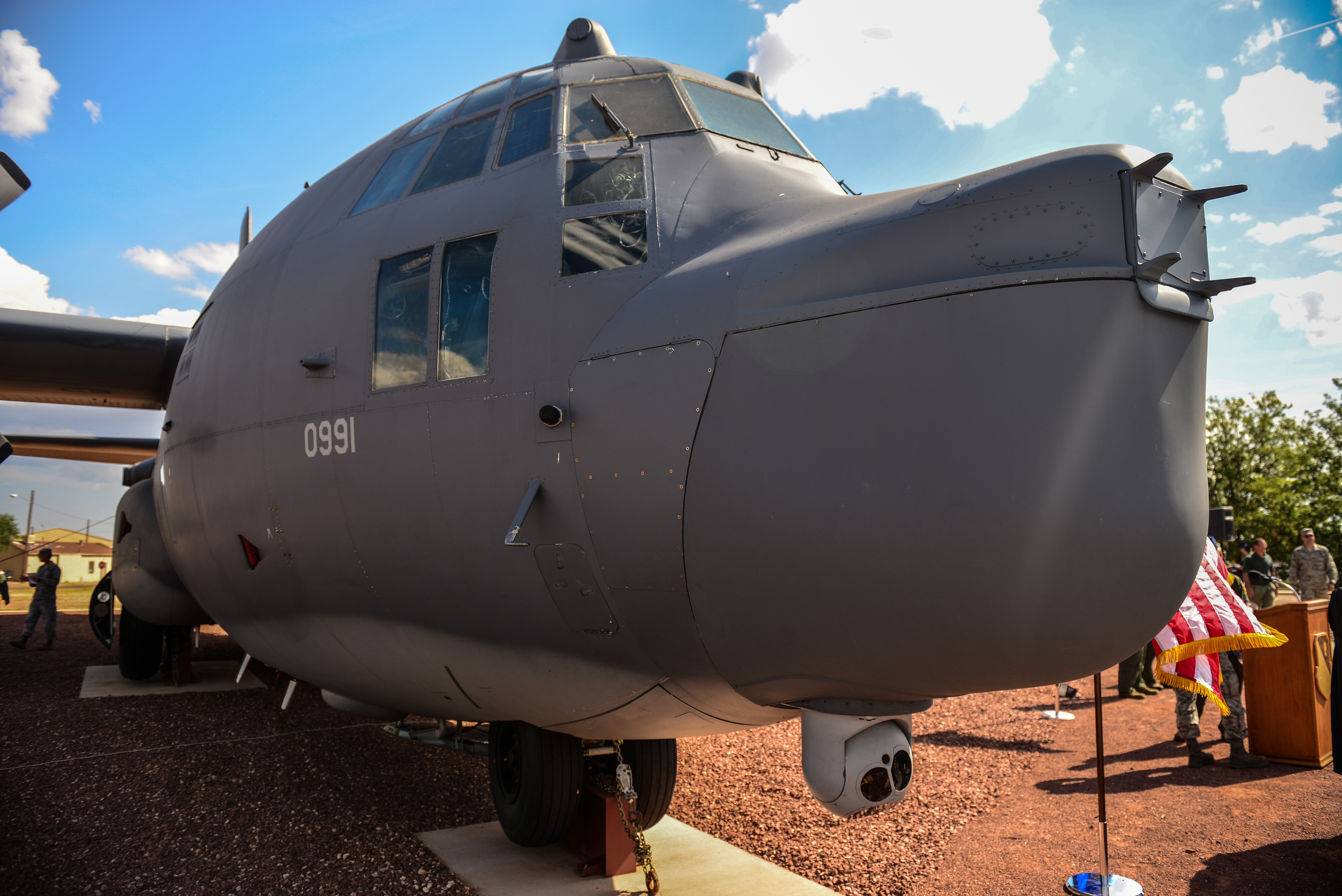
MC-130P Combat Shadow

The MC-130P series of aircraft entered service in 1965 during the Vietnam War as HC-130H CROWN airborne controllers to locate downed aircrew and direct Combat Search and Rescue operations over North Vietnam. After tanker equipment was added to 11 HC-130Hs, they entered service as HC-130P SAR command and control/helicopter aerial refueling aircraft in November 1966. Combat Shadows have been part of the Air Force special operations force since 1986. In February 1996, AFSOC's 28-aircraft tanker fleet was redesignated the MC-130P, aligning the variant with other M-series special operations mission aircraft. USAF continues to field 33 HC-130P/HC-130N dedicated CSAR aircraft as part of Air Combat Command.

Combat Shadows provided air refueling support in Panama to Army and Air Force helicopters during Operation Just Cause. In 1990, four Combat Shadows of the 9th Special Operations Squadron deployed to King Fahd International Airport, Saudi Arabia for Desert Storm, and three of the 67th Special Operations Squadron to Batman Air Base, Turkey for Proven Force. Since the Gulf War, the MC-130P has been involved in numerous operations, including Northern Watch and Southern Watch (Iraq), Deny Flight (Yugoslavia), Restore Democracy and Uphold Democracy (Haiti), Deliberate Force and Joint Endeavor (Bosnia), Assured Response (Liberia), Guardian Retrieval (Zaire), Enduring Freedom (Afghanistan) and Iraqi Freedom.

The Combat Shadow flew single or multi-ship low-level air refueling missions for special operations helicopters conducting infiltration, exfiltration, and supply missions, with command and control capability in limited situations. The primary emphasis for Combat Shadows was on night operations using NVGs, to reduce probability of visual acquisition and intercept by airborne threats.

The last two AFSOC MC-130Ps were retired on 15 May 2015. However, four MC-130P aircraft continue to be flown by the 129th Rescue Wing (129 RQW) of the California Air National Guard. Although the MC-130P was ostensibly an AFSOC aircraft, the examples still flown by the 129 RQW are part of a rescue squadron assigned to a combat search and rescue/personnel recovery (CSAR / PR) mission and are therefore operationally gained by the Air Combat Command (ACC) versus AFSOC. These MC-130P aircraft will eventually be replaced by the HC-130J Combat King II.

== MC-130W Combat Spear ==
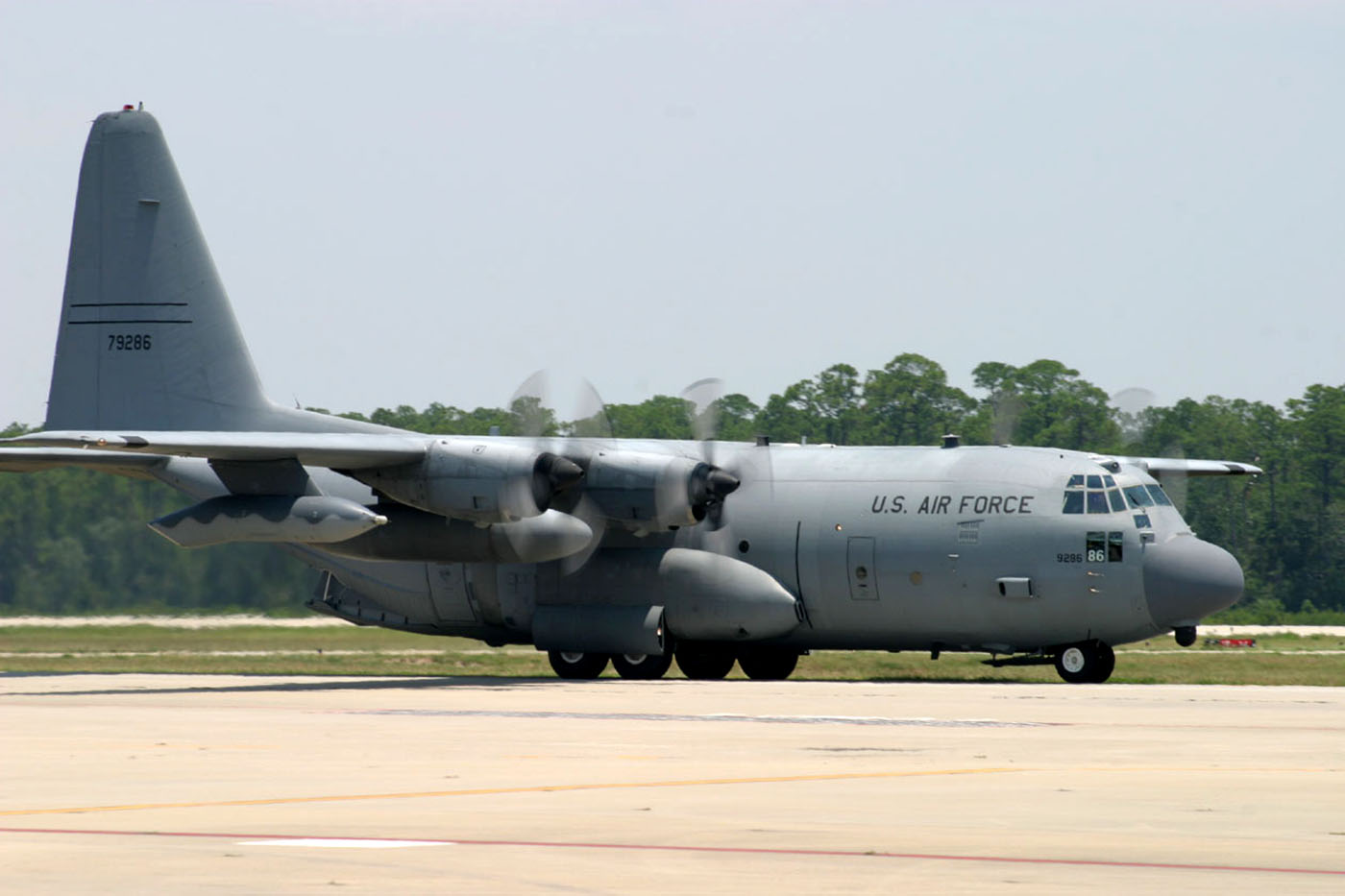
MC-130W Combat Spear, AF Ser. No. 87-9286, at Hurlburt Field, Florida

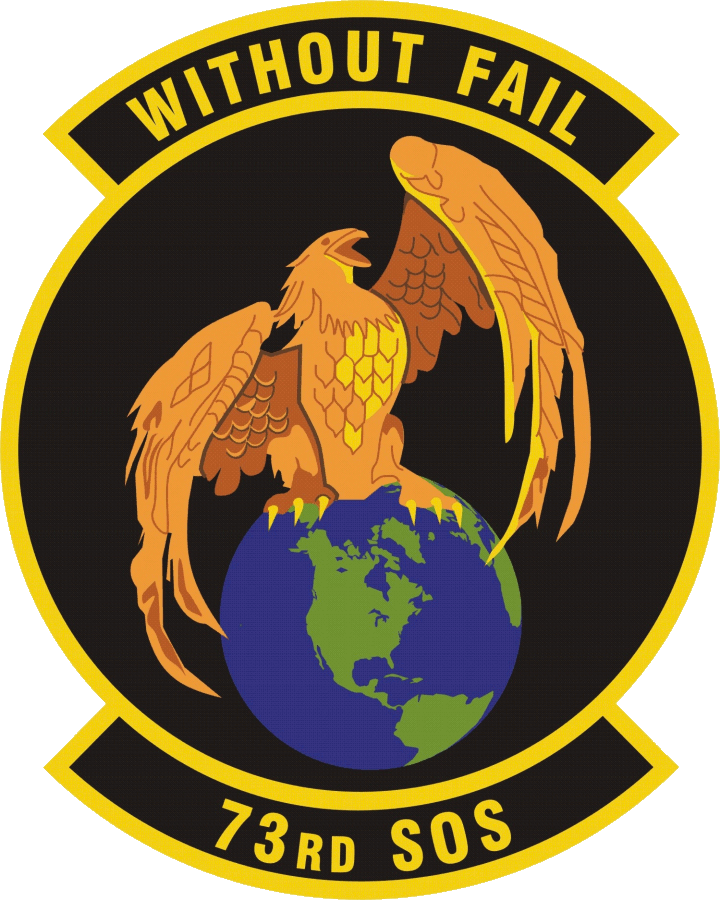
73rd Special Operations Squadron

The MC-130W Combat Spear, unofficially and facetiously nicknamed the "Combat Wombat", performed clandestine or low visibility missions into denied areas to provide aerial refueling to SOF helicopters or to air drop small SOF teams and supply bundles.

The first of 12 MC-130Ws, AF Ser. No. 87-9286, was presented to Air Force Special Operations Command on 28 June 2006. The aircraft was developed to supplement the MC-130 Combat Talon and Combat Shadow forces as an interim measure after several training accidents and contingency losses in supporting the global war on terrorism. The program modified C-130H-2 airframes from the 1987–1990 production run, acquired from airlift units in the Air Force Reserve Command and Air National Guard. Use of the H-2 airframe allowed installation of SOF systems already configured for Combat Talons without expensive and time-consuming development that would be required of new production C-130J aircraft, reducing the flyaway cost of the Spear to $60 million per aircraft. The Combat Spears, however, do not have a Terrain Following/Terrain Avoidance capability.

A standard system of special forces avionics equips the MC-130W: a fully integrated Global Positioning System and Inertial Navigation System, an AN/APN-241 Low Power Color weather/navigation radar; interior and exterior NVG-compatible lighting; advanced threat detection and automated countermeasures, including active infrared countermeasures as well as chaff and flares; upgraded communication suites, including dual satellite communications using data burst transmission to make trackback difficult; aerial refueling capability; and the ability to act as an aerial tanker for helicopters and CV-22 Osprey aircraft using Mk 32B-902E refueling pods.

The MC-130Ws were assigned to the 73rd Special Operations Squadron at Cannon Air Force Base, New Mexico, with all twelve operational by 2010. Initially nicknamed the "Whiskey" (NATO phonetic for the "W" modifier), the MC-130W was officially dubbed the Combat Spear in May 2007 to honor the historical legacy of the Combat Talons in Vietnam.

=== MC-130W Dragon Spear ===
Operational demands on aging AC-130s led the Air Force to seek a replacement until new AC-130Js could enter the fleet. A first idea—acquire and develop an AC-27J Stinger II—fell through, so in May 2009, the Air Force began looking at converting MC-130Ws into interim gunships. On 17 November 2009, a contract was awarded to Alliant Techsystems to produce 30 mm ammunition for the Dragon Spear.

In September 2010, the Air Force awarded a $61 million contract to L-3 Communications to give a gunship-like attack capability to eight MC-130W Combat Spear special-mission aircraft. Under the deal, L-3 added the weapons kits, called "precision strike packages". MC-130Ws fitted with the weapons were renamed Dragon Spears. Air Force Special Operations Command eventually converted all 12 MC-130W aircraft to Dragon Spears.

The Dragon Spears were equipped with a Bushmaster II GAU-23/A 30mm gun (an improved version of the MK44 MOD0 30mm gun), sensors, communications systems, and the Gunslinger precision-guided munitions system: a launch tube designed to fire up to 10 GBU-44/B Viper Strike or AGM-176 Griffin small standoff munitions in quick succession. Initial supplemental funds to the 2010 Defense Authorization Bill were for two kits to be installed in 2010.

The MC-130W Dragon Spear went from concept to flying with a minimum capability in less than 90 days, and from concept to deployment in 18 months. Its success won its program the William J. Perry Award, and it became the model for the AC-130J gunship program.

The first partially converted MC-130W arrived in Afghanistan in late 2010. It fired its first weapon one month after arriving, killing five enemy combatants with a Hellfire missile. In May 2012 the Dragon Spear was redesignated the AC-130W Stinger II. By September 2013, 14 aircraft had been converted into gunships. The conversion added a sensor package consisting of day/night video cameras with magnification capability.

== MC-130J Commando II ==
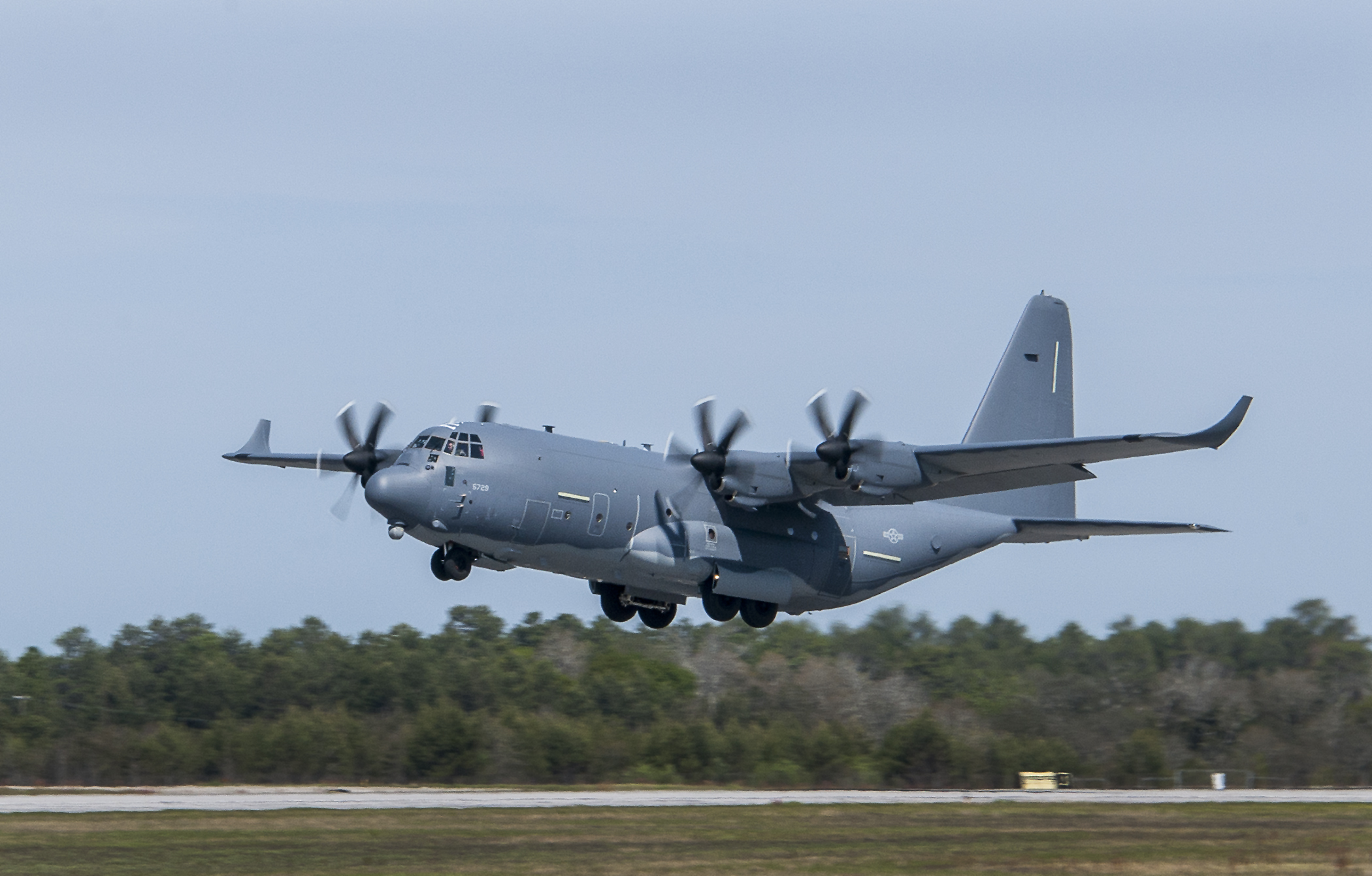
A MC-130J modified with winglets takes off from Eglin AFB in March 2016.

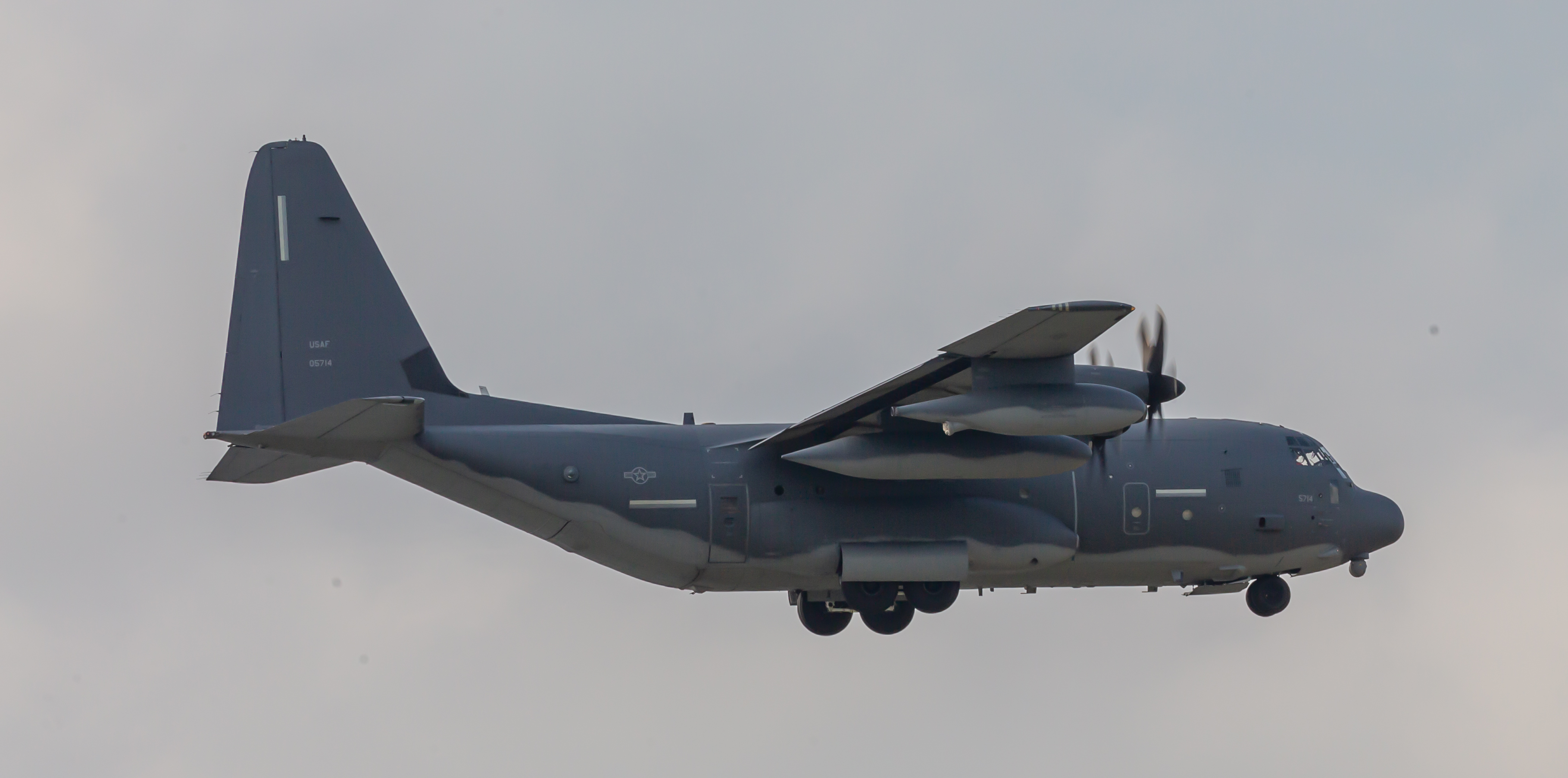
20200326 MC-130J

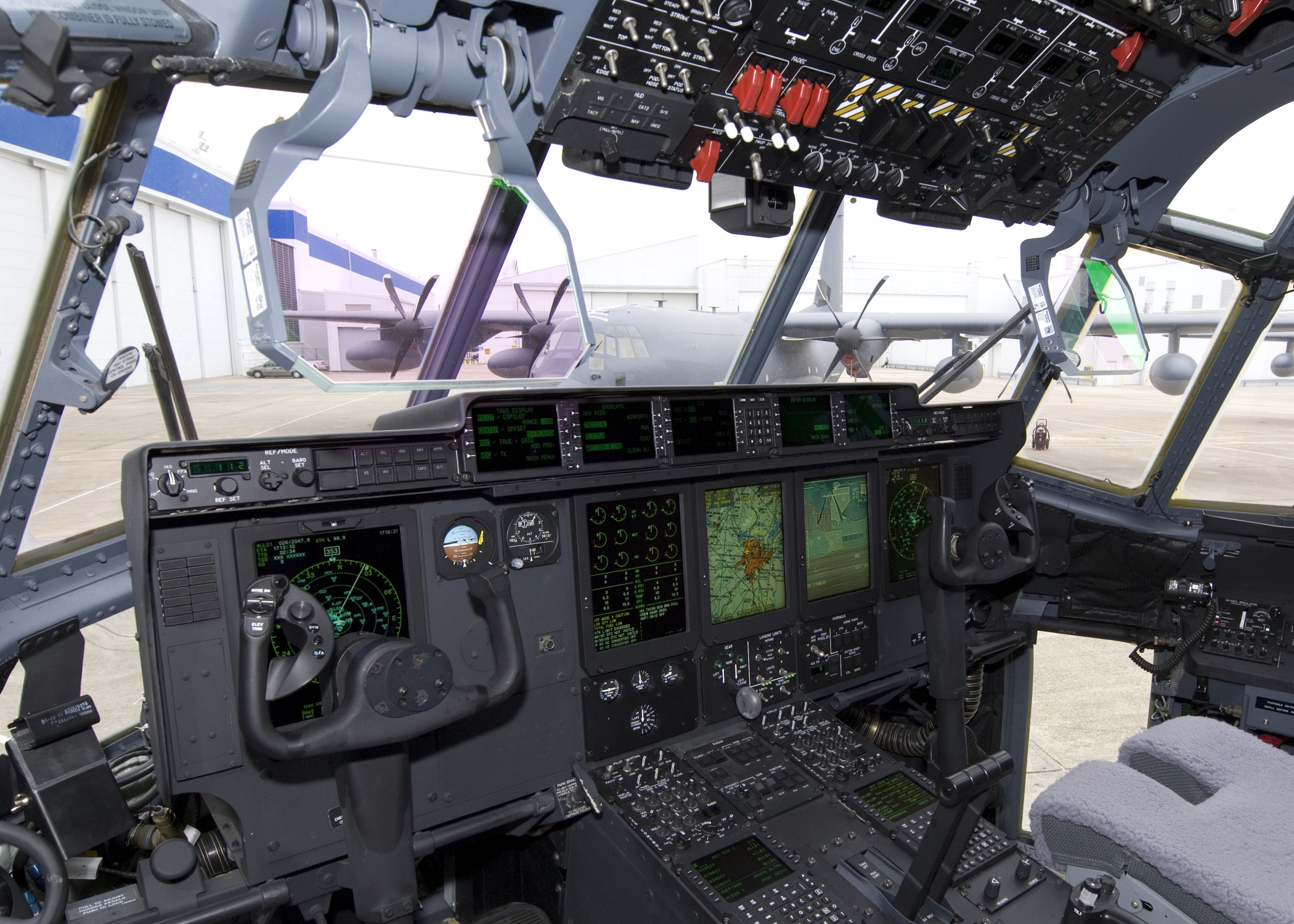
A cockpit view of the MC-130J

Beginning in 1997, studies of the vulnerability of the non-stealthy MC-130 force reflected concerns about its viability in modern high-threat environments, including the prevalence of man-portable air-defense systems in asymmetric conflicts. At least two studies were conducted or proposed to explore the prospect of a replacement aircraft (known variously as "MC-X" or "M-X"), with USAF at that time hoping for an Initial Operating Capability date of 2018. One analyst questioned the survivability of slow non-stealthy platforms such as the MC-130 in future threat environments in a 2007 presentation to the Center for Strategic and International Studies, and stated his opinion that development of a stealthy replacement for the MC-130 is a "strategic priority". The U.S. Department of Defense's 2006 Quadrennial Defense Review Report also recognized the concern, asserting DoD's intention to "enhance capabilities to support SOF insertion and extraction into denied areas from strategic distances."

Despite these concerns, the USAF decided to proceed with modernization of the current force. In 2010, the Air Force stated it would build 37 MC-130Js to replace its MC-130Es and MC-130Ps, both of which were 40 years old. Based on the KC-130J tanker operated by the United States Marine Corps, the new MC-130J has added features for both combat search and rescue and special operations missions, introducing major modifications to the Block 6.5 KC-130J. The MC-130J adds an Enhanced Service Life Wing, an Enhanced Cargo Handling System, a Universal Aerial Refueling Receptacle Slipway Installation (UARRSI) boom refueling receptacle, more powerful electrical generators, an electro-optical/infrared sensor, a combat systems officer (CSO) station on the flight deck, provisions for the Large Aircraft Infrared Countermeasures System, and armor.

Production of the first MC-130J aircraft was started at Lockheed Martin's facility in Marietta, Georgia, on 5 October 2009. Lockheed Martin also contracted to build an HC-130J tanker variant for Air Force Special Operations Command on its standard C-130J production line. The MC-130J is the first C-130 specifically built for special operations, making it lighter and more efficient. Most special operations aircraft are modified after production to accommodate special operations missions. The MC-130J was initially called the Combat Shadow II to honor the service of the aging MC-130P platform that it was replacing but was officially named the Commando II in March 2012.

The Air Force Special Operations Training Center conducted the initial MC-130J training program in conjunction with the Pennsylvania Air National Guard's 193rd Special Operations Wing, using its four EC-130J Commando Solo aircraft to develop the training syllabus for MC-130J aircrew members. The MC-130J operates with a 5-member crew, eliminating the CSO navigator and the enlisted flight engineer positions that had been in the Combat Shadow's crew, with the remaining CSO handling electronic warfare as well as the navigation and aerial refueling duties formerly conducted by the navigator and flight engineer. The 415th Special Operations Squadron, a unit of the 58th Operations Group at Kirtland AFB, New Mexico, was reactivated on 22 September 2011 as the main training unit for both MC-130J and HC-130J Combat King II crews.

The 522nd Special Operations Squadron was the first unit to operate the MC-130J Commando II, and achieved Initial Operational Capability in 2012. The first MC-130J, AF Ser. No. 09-6207, undertook its initial test flight on 22 April 2011. The 522nd Special Operations Squadron received its first MC-130J in late September 2011.

A total of 37 MC-130J aircraft were programmed to replace all other MC-130 variants by the end of the fiscal year 2017. MC-130Js completely replaced Combat Talons at RAF Mildenhall in 2014 and began replacing those at Kadena AB in 2015. 20 were in service in FY 2015 with seven additional airframes in production. On 26 October 2019, MC-130J Commando II special mission aircraft accompanied Joint Special Operations Command 160th SOAR MH-60 and MH-47s, which carried 1st SFOD-D and 75th Ranger RRC operators, into Idlib province during the Barisha raid.

== Operational losses ==
Between 1967 and 2026, eleven MC-130 special operations aircraft have been destroyed in operations, two of them in combat in the Vietnam War, resulting in the deaths of 68 crewmen and passengers:

- C-130E(I) / MC-130E Combat Talon I – four
- MC-130H Combat Talon II – four
- MC-130P Combat Shadow – one
- MC-130J Commando II – two

=== Combat Talon I losses ===
Two of the four aircraft assigned to Project Stray Goose were lost in combat: 64-0563 was destroyed on 25 November 1967, by a direct hit of a mortar round while parked on the Nha Trang flightline. The aircraft had been scheduled for a mission and had just completed preflight of the exterior when the mission was cancelled. Soon after the crew left the ramp, the aircraft was hit and destroyed by fire.

64-0547 was missing-in-action with its entire 11-man crew on 29 December 1967, on a mission to drop leaflets inside North Vietnam. The Blackbird had completed its leaflet drop leg of the mission at 30,000 ft (9,100 m) and begun its descent to its terrain-following exit altitude. Communication was lost without the Blackbird reporting any threats detected. SOF commanders at the time discounted the possibility of its being shot down because the flight, conducted by an inexperienced aircraft commander under new moon conditions, was not claimed as such by North Vietnam. In November 1992, the wreckage was located near the peak of a mountain 32 mi (51 km) northeast of Dien Bien Phu, and it was surmised that its descent was too steep for its TF/TA radar to stabilize. 64-0547 was the only special operations MC-130 lost on a combat mission over hostile terrain in the history of the program.

64-0558 was lost in a mid-air collision during a night training exercise 15 miles north of Conway, South Carolina on 5 December 1972. An F-102 Delta Dagger of the South Carolina Air National Guard, attempting a night intercept of the Talon, flew into the fuel drop tank on its right wing, with the loss of both aircraft, killing all 12 aboard the C-130E(I). 64-0558 had been one of the two Talons assigned to the Son Tay POW camp rescue mission.

Former Heavy Chain and Desert One veteran 64-0564 crashed into the ocean shortly after a pre-dawn takeoff from NAS Cubi Point, Philippines, on 26 February 1981, killing 15 passengers and eight of nine crewmen. The Talon was taking part in Special Warfare Exercise 81 and had flown 12 missions in the preceding 16 days. Following an administrative flight the day before, the crew was scheduled for its last mission, a night exercise that was set back from 01:00 local time to 04:30. The flight profile consisted of a normal takeoff, a tactical landing a half-hour later to onload 15 Navy SEALs, followed by a tactical takeoff. The Talon reported normal flight conditions six minutes after the tactical takeoff, but crashed nine minutes later. No cause was determined, but investigators found that the likely causes were either crew fatigue from operations tempo, or failure of the terrain following radar to enter "override" mode while over water.

=== Combat Shadow/Talon II losses ===
Combat Shadow 66-0213 (Ditka 03) was lost when it flew into a mountain top in eastern Afghanistan on 13 February 2002. Assigned to the 9th SOS, the aircraft was refueling an MH-47E helicopter on a CSAR mission when it was forced to make an emergency climb in poor visibility to escape a box canyon in the mountainous terrain. The MC-130P ran out of climb performance and crash-landed wheels-up in deep snow. The aircraft was a total loss but the crew of eight survived with relatively minor injuries.

Combat Talon II 84-0475, assigned to the 15th SOS, was lost in a takeoff crash on 12 June 2002, near Gardez, Afghanistan. During a night exfiltration mission of two Special Forces soldiers from a landing strip at the Sardeh Band dam, the Talon crashed less than three miles from the airstrip shortly after takeoff. Conflicting reports point to overweight cargo and windshear as possible causes. The Talon's two loadmasters and a passenger were killed.

Combat Talon II 90-0161, also of the 15th SOS, crashed into Monte Perucho, south of Caguas, Puerto Rico, during a training mission on 7 August 2002, killing all ten aboard. The Talon was flying a terrain-following night mission in blowing rain and fog, along a low level route commonly used by the Puerto Rico Air National Guard. The crew misinterpreted and disregarded terrain obstacle warnings.

Combat Talon II 85-0012 was severely damaged during a landing accident at Qayyarah-West Air Base, south of Mosul, Iraq, on 29 December 2004. The 15th SOS aircraft was on a resupply mission and struck an open trench that was part of repairs to the runway while still at 80 knots, shearing off its landing gear and much of its lower fuselage, and partially separating its left wing from the fuselage. The trench was part of a U.S. Army project to repair damage to the runway from prior bombing by allied forces. A Notice To Airmen (NOTAM) warning had not been filed by the airfield or disseminated to the aircrew, despite a safety hazard report filed in the week previous by another aircrew. No fatalities occurred and classified equipment was salvaged before the aircraft was destroyed by explosive demolition due to the airframe being unrepairable.

A Combat Talon II of the 7th SOS, 87-0127 (Wrath 11), crashed during a terrain-following-and-avoidance night training exercise on 31 March 2005, near Rovie, in the Drizez Mountains in southeast Albania, 60 miles southeast of Tirana. The Talon had taken off from Tirana-Rinas Airport 20 minutes before and was one of two flying at 300 ft (91 m) AGL at a reduced power setting. An investigation revealed that the plane stalled attempting to clear terrain following the crew's "loss of situational awareness". All nine crew members aboard were killed.

=== Commando II losses ===
Amid the 2026 Iran war, two U.S. Air Force MC-130J Commando IIs along with two MH-6 Little Bird special operations helicopters were destroyed at a forward operating base inside Iran on 4 April 2026 by American forces after becoming disabled to prevent their technology from falling into Iranian hands.

== Specifications (MC-130J Commando II) ==
Data from USAF factsheet : MC-130J Commando II

General characteristics

- Crew: Two pilots, one Combat Systems Officer (officers), and two Loadmasters (enlisted)
- Length: 97 ft 9 in (29.79 m)
- Wingspan: 132 ft 7 in (40.41 m)
- Height: 38 ft 10 in (11.84 m)
- Max takeoff weight: 164,000 lb (74,389 kg)
- Powerplant: 4 × Rolls-Royce AE 2100D3 turboprop engines, 4,591 shp (3,424 kW) each
- Propellers: 6-bladed fully feathering reversible propellers

Performance

- Cruise speed: 417 mph (671 km/h, 362 kn) at 22,000 feet
- Range: 3,000 mi (4,800 km, 2,600 nmi)
- Service ceiling: 28,000 ft (8,500 m) with 42,000 lb payload

== See also ==
- AN/ALQ-172

Related development

- C-130 Hercules
- Lockheed HC-130
- Lockheed Martin KC-130
- Lockheed AC-130

Related lists

- List of active United States military aircraft
