= Operation Talon =

Operation Talon may designate: landing and airlift operations

- the British amphibious landing at Akyab in western Burma on 3 January 1945, during the Burma campaign
- Operation Talon, a unexecuted UN Command's landing and airdrop of Wonsan in 1951 during Korean War.
- Operation Talon, a military operation of the Vietnam War, in September 1965
- Operation Talon (Iraq), north of Fallujah, in 2006
- Operation Talon, a deployment of Canadian troops to Afghanistan, in 2006 (see Abdul Qayyum Jamal, the ringleader of the Toronto terrorist plot of June 2006)
- Operation Talon, an Australian police operation against the Middle Eastern crime gang Brothers for Life, in Sydney, Australia, in 2017.
