= Tallon =

Tallon is a given name, and a surname. As a surname it is of Norman-derived Irish origin and was Gaelicised as Talún. Notable people with the name include:

== Surname ==
- Andrew Tallon (1949–2018), Belgian art historian
- Dale Tallon (born 1950), Canadian ice hockey defenceman and executive
- Don Tallon (1916–1984), Australian cricketer
- Gary Tallon (born 1973), Irish footballer
- James R. Tallon (born 1941), American politician
- Liam Tallon, Australian rugby league player
- Robin Tallon (born 1946), American politician
- William Tallon (1935–2007), English steward

== Given name ==
- Tallon Griekspoor (born 1996), Dutch tennis player

== See also ==
- Talon (disambiguation)
