= Talon (rural locality) =

Talon Талон
- Village
- Location within Altai Republic Location within Russia
- Coordinates: 52°20′N 88°21′E
- Country: Russia
- Region: Altai Republic
- District: Turochaksky District
- Time zone: UTC+7:00

Talon (Russian: Талон; Altay: Толоон, Toloon) is a rural locality (a selo) in Mayskoye Rural Settlement of Turochaksky District, the Altai Republic, Russia. The population was 13 as of 2016. There is 1 street.

== Geography ==
Talon is located on the slope of the Biysk Range near the Kaurchak River, 147 km east of Turochak (the district's administrative centre) by road. Klyuchevoy is the nearest rural locality.
