= Talon MHS-II =

- Category: Can-Am
- Constructor: Talon

Technical specifications
- Engine: Chevrolet 5,000 cc (305.1 cu in) 16 valve, OHV V8, naturally aspirated, mid-engined

Competition history
- Notable drivers: Hunter Harris
- Debut: 1977 Can-Am Laguna Seca Raceway
Races	Wins	Poles	F/Laps
4	0	0	0
- Teams' Championships: 0
- Constructors' Championships: 0
- Drivers' Championships: 0

The Talon MHS-II was a short-lived Can-Am sports prototype racing car, built by Talon in 1977. Fitted with a 5-litre Chevrolet V8 engine, the car proved to be unsuccessful, as it never finished a race.

== Racing history ==
The Talon MHS-II was built by Talon in 1977 for the Can-Am series. It used a 5-litre Chevrolet V8 engine, and was driven by Hunter Harris. It made its debut at the second race of the season, held at Laguna Seca Raceway; however, Harris retired the car after 32 laps, and was classified eleventh. Having missed the third race of the season, Harris returned for the next round, held at Road America; this time after 27 laps due to a broken gear, being classified in 16th. He would not compete again until the eighth round of the season, held at Sears Point; this time, the engine failed after 13 laps, forcing him to retire, and be classified 16th once more. Harris would then enter the next round, held at Riverside; this time, another mechanical problem caused him to retire after 31 laps, and resulted in him being classified 25th. The MHS-II was never raced again.
