= Le Boullay-Thierry =

- Commune
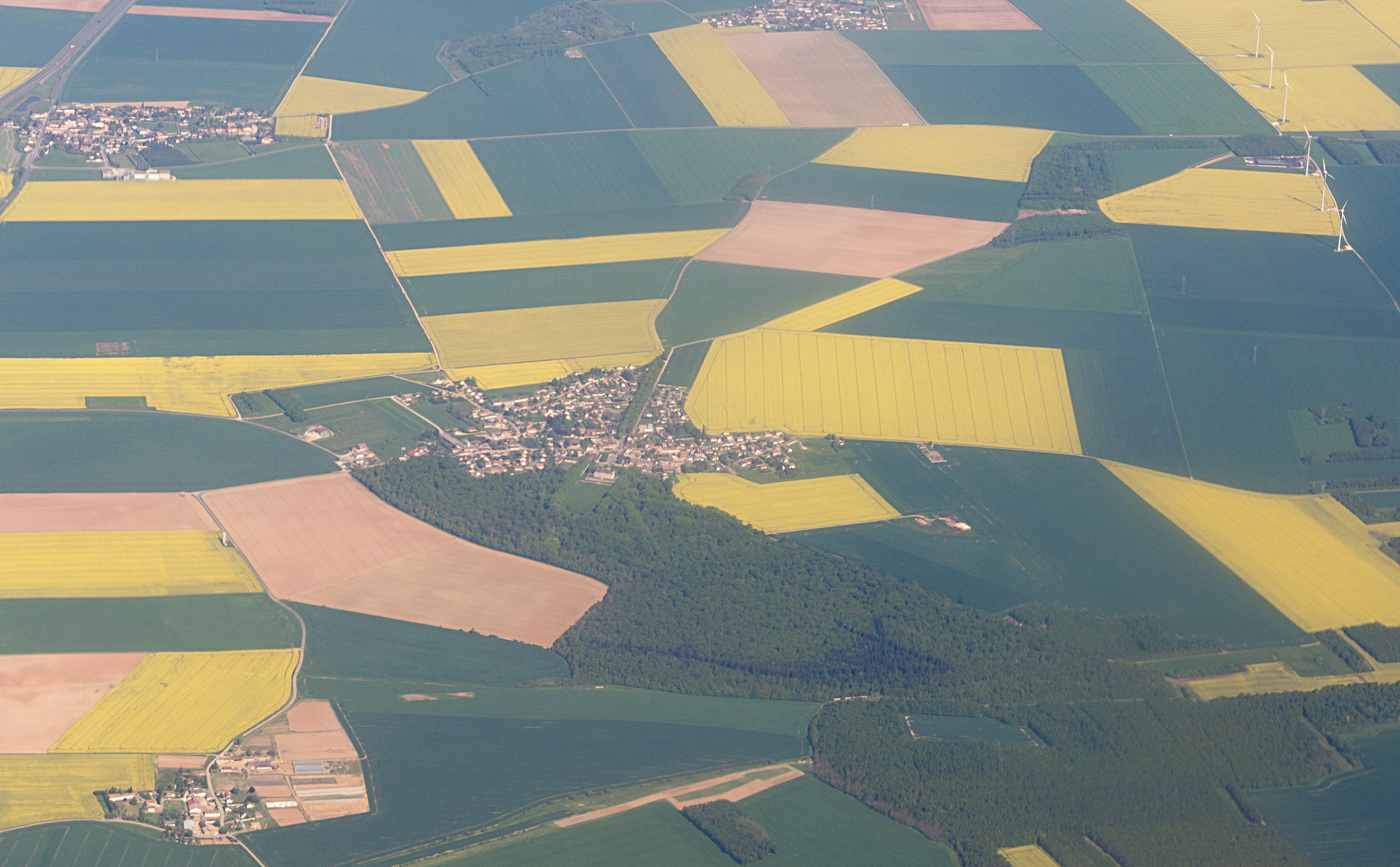
- Aerial view (2018)
- Location of Le Boullay-Thierry
- Location within France Location within Centre-Val de Loire
- Coordinates: 48°38′20″N 1°25′52″E
- Country: France
- Region: Centre-Val de Loire
- Department: Eure-et-Loir
- Arrondissement: Dreux
- Canton: Dreux-2
- Intercommunality: CA Pays de Dreux

Government
  - Mayor (2020–2026): Frédéric Giroux
- Area^{1}: 12.87 km^{2} (4.97 sq mi)
- Elevation: 150 m (490 ft)
- Highest elevation: 176 m (577 ft)
- Lowest elevation: 110 m (360 ft)
- Population (2023): 594
  - Density: 46.2/km^{2} (120/sq mi)
- Time zone: UTC+01:00 (CET)
  - Summer (DST): UTC+02:00 (CEST)
- INSEE/Postal code: 28055 /28210
- ^{1} French Land Register data, which excludes lakes, ponds, glaciers > 1 km^{2} (0.386 sq mi or 247 acres) and river estuaries.

Le Boullay-Thierry (French pronunciation: [lə bulɛ tjɛʁi]) is a commune in the Eure-et-Loir department in France.

== Population ==
Historical population
Year	Pop.	±% p.a.
1968	234	—
1975	282	+2.70%
1982	324	+2.00%
1990	348	+0.90%
1999	483	+3.71%
2007	527	+1.10%
2012	589	+2.25%
2017	553	−1.25%
2023	594	+1.20%
Source: INSEE

== See also ==
- Communes of the Eure-et-Loir department
