= List of recipients of the George Medal, 1960s–1980s =

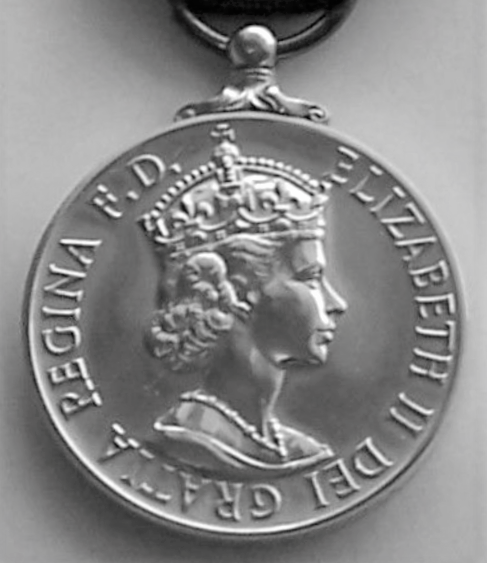
Elizabeth II, late 1950s to date. Inscribed: "ELIZABETH II DEI GRATIA REGINA F.D."

The George Medal is awarded by the United Kingdom and Commonwealth of Nations for acts of great bravery; over 2,000 medals have been awarded since its inception in September 1940. Below is set out a selection of recipients of the award, between 1960 and 1989. A person's presence in this list does not suggest their award was more notable than any other award of the George Medal.

Where a recipient has received a second George Medal, a picture of the ribbon bearing the bar symbol is shown. In December 1977 the provisions for the medal were altered, allowing it to be awarded posthumously, in which case the "†" symbol appears next to the recipient's name.

== 1960s ==
Name	Rank and Unit	Action/Citation	Year awarded
Ivan James Adams	Senior constable, Queensland Police Force	The dredge Kaptajn Nielsen overturned without warning in Moreton Bay, trapping crew below deck in 35 feet (11 m) of water. The water police officer and volunteer diver Joseph Engwirda immediately dived into the murky water and rescued twelve survivors, and some deceased persons. After air issues, they revived, and returned to the upturned vessel for other possible survivors. Engwirda also awarded the George Medal, and British Empire Medals to three other volunteer divers.	1965
Hilton Frank Alomes	Police officer, Bushy Park, Tasmania	For rescuing two people during the Derwent Valley floods.	1960
Margaret Cleland	Policewoman, London, England	For preventing Thomas French from committing suicide by jumping off a building whilst holding his infant son in Bloomsbury, London, in March 1964.	1964
Sidney Brazier	Captain, Royal Army Ordnance Corps	For bravery during the removal and disposal of Type-74 grenades discovered close to the married quarters barrack area and the railway at Aldershot.	1963
John Campbell	Constable, City of Glasgow Police	On 30 December 1969, following the Linwood bank robbery, he tackled and disarmed Howard Wilson, a former police officer turned bank robber, after three other police officers had already been shot, two fatally.	1969
Robert Carswell	Constable, Liverpool City Police.	In recognition of his brave conduct apprehending an armed robber in August 1961.	1962
Ian Patrick Crawford	Captain, Royal Army Medical Corps	For bravery in saving the life of an injured officer trapped in a helicopter crash in the jungles of in Sarawak during the Borneo Conflict. On 20 April 1964, while serving as a captain, Crawford was attached as the Medical Officer to the 1st Battalion, 7th Duke of Edinburgh's Own Gurkha Rifles when the helicopter he was travelling in visiting troops forward in the thick jungle suffered engine failure. The helicopter crashed on a steep hillside and rolled down the hillside with ever increasing damage until tree trunks arrested it crushing the arm of Major Eric Smith (Army officer), always known as "Birdie" Smith. The helicopter was at risk of imminent fire from spilt fuel, and those in it were in grave danger. With no thought for his safety Crawford remained for the next hour attending to Smith's injuries including performing an emergency amputation of Smith's right arm without morphia, and stayed with Smith until they were evacuated by helicopter to Simmanggang. Despite complete exhaustion, he helped with surgery at Simmanggang and at Kuching. Crawford had already assisted six Gurkha soldiers to escape from the wreckage of the helicopter, there was a great danger of the remnants of the helicopter going up in flames, before he found Smith badly injured, trapped in the wreckage, and saved his life.	1964
James McMurray Dunlop	Fireman, Glasgow Fire Service	For his part in fighting the Cheapside Street whisky bond fire which killed 14 firefighters and five members of the Salvage Corps.	1960
Joseph Engwirda	Volunteer scuba diver	The dredge Kaptajn Nielsen overturned without warning in Moreton Bay, trapping crew below deck in 35 feet (11 m) of water. Volunteer diver Engwirda and water police officer Ivan Adams immediately dived into the murky water and rescued twelve survivors, and some deceased persons. After air issues, they revived, and returned to the upturned vessel for other possible survivors. Adams also awarded the George Medal, and British Empire Medals to three other volunteer divers.	1965
Glen Patrick Hallahan	Detective Constable 1st Class, Queensland Police Force	For his part in the apprehension of a man armed with a rifle in Brisbane, who had threatened to kill two other officers. Terence Murray Lewis also awarded the George Medal. Two other officers awarded British Empire Medals.	1960
Anthony Eric Johns	Civilian	In recognition of his courage and complete disregard of his own safety in going to the rescue of a young girl who had been attacked by a shark at Oakura Beach on 8 January 1966.	1966
Johnstone Ronald Linthwaite	Detective senior constable #4503, Queensland Police Force	A suspicious male when stopped, produced a revolver and pointed at a sergeant. Struck in the knee by a bullet, the sergeant fell to the ground, Linthwaite rushed straight at the offender who then ran off. The offender then turned and fired at Linthwaite three times, narrowly missing him. He displayed a very high order of bravery and devotion to duty.	1963
Terence Murray Lewis	Detective Senior Constable, Queensland Police Force	For his part in the apprehension of a man armed with a rifle in Brisbane, who had threatened to kill two other officers. Glen Patrick Hallahan also awarded the George Medal. Two other officers awarded British Empire Medals.	1960
Terence Frederick McFall	Constable, Metropolitan Police	For the bravery he displayed on 25 August 1966 when he and Constable Anthony John Gledhill chased and subdued armed criminals.	1967
Jurgen "George" Preissler	Ski professional/miner	George J. Preissler helped to rescue Heinrich W. Wenzel following a cave-in, Britannia Beach, British Columbia, 1 November 1960. When 2,000 tons of rock fell in an ore mine where he was working, Wenzel, 44, miner, was trapped in a seated position in a small chamber formed by the debris, which included timbers used to form the working levels of the mine. One timber nearly severed his arm just below the shoulder, but the artery was pinched shut and did not bleed. Preissler, 29, miner, and other miners called out to Wenzel, who reported his situation and physical condition. John Johnson, Dr. Barrie C. Flather, and mine officials arrived. Unable to find an opening in the rubble, Preissler, Johnson, and others began digging in gravel which had been used to backfill the lower levels previously mined. They excavated a tunnel three feet wide and four feet high for 35 feet just under the flooring of the level 10 feet below Wenzel's position. Preissler and Johnson then cut and carefully removed timbers, which had penetrated from the working level above. With only dim light from the lamp of his miner's hat, Preissler wriggled through the opening in the debris into a passage 18 inches high and wide, the bottom of which sloped upward in the direction of Wenzel. Taking care not to dislodge debris at the points where clearance was as little as 14 inches, Preissler squirmed through the rubble for 14 feet and reached Wenzel's chamber, which had an opening one foot in diameter. Wenzel said he was in considerable pain. Preissler wriggled backward through the, debris and returned to the other men. He reported on conditions and then cautiously crawled back to Wenzel with water and a pain-killing drug. Wenzel took them but said that he could not get through the chamber's small opening with his injured arm. Dr. Flather, who was larger than Preissler, volunteered to try to reach Wenzel and give medical aid, but was unable to reach Wenzel. Preissler later in his life stated that the earlier news accounts were not accurate and that he was the only person able to reach Wenzel. When Wenzel urged Preissler to amputate his arm, it was Wenzel who performed the amputation. At the urging of Preissler, Wenzel with difficulty squirmed through the opening. He followed Preissler downward through the passage and thence out of the tunnel. Wenzel was hospitalized and recuperated for eight months. Preissler was also awarded the Carnegie Medal for his act of extraordinary civilian heroism.	1961
John Joseph Ryan	Detective Sergeant 1st Class #3654, Queensland Police Force	First awarded for disarming a violent criminal found in a stolen car on the outskirts of Brisbane, who threatening police officers with a rifle. Climbing into the car, Ryan spoke with the offender, then during a struggle had a shot discharged to avoid arrest. Later in the same year, Ryan awarded a second George Medal for disarming another man also armed with a rifle. At a domestic disturbance, a male had slashed his wrists, then absconded. He was located later in the house where he fired shots from a rifle. In the darkness under the house, Ryan tried to negotiate with the male who made threats to kill any police who approached him. Walking towards Ryan, a shot was fired, and after a struggle, the offender was disarmed.	1963
Albert Edward "Rocky" Small	Company Sergeant Major, 10th Battalion, The Parachute Regiment, TA	On 14 May 1961 Sergeant Small was on duty as a despatcher during Parachute Training from a balloon at the RAF Station Hornchurch. Immediately after he had despatched the first of four parachutists the balloon exploded and the cage, with only the collapsed fabric as support, started to free fall. Sergeant Small, with admirable presence of mind succeeded in despatching two more parachutists despite the cage tilting to nearly 45 degrees. These men descended unhurt. Sergeant Small could then have despatched the last man and, as an extremely experienced parachutist, jumped himself with a very reasonable chance of avoiding injury. However he considered that the balloon was now too near the ground for a comparatively inexperienced parachutist to survive a descent, and he therefore retained this man in the cage and remained himself. He then proceeded to give clear and calm instructions as to the best position to adopt to avoid injury. During this period the rate of descent had accelerated rapidly, and the cage was nearly inverted. On impact both occupants suffered only minor injuries; a miraculous escape due to the orders given by Sergeant Small. His companion is on record as saying that he considered that he was about to be killed, and that he undoubtedly would have been but for Sergeant Small. Throughout the incident Sergeant Small's courage and presence of mind was beyond praise. By despatching two men in the most hazardous conditions, he saved them from serious injury or death, and lightened the cage at a critical period. By remaining with the last man, he undoubtedly saved his life, showing complete disregard for his own safety in the process.	1961
Eric Charles Smith	Sergeant, RAF	For his part in the rescue of 2 men from a wrecked French trawler at Land's End. The trawler "Jeanne Gougy" ran aground and fell on her side. Sgt Eric Smith of 22 Squadron, Royal Air Force, volunteered to be lowered to the stricken French fishing vessel to rescue two trawlermen from inside the wheelhouse, which was continually being submerged by breaking waves.	1963
Stewart Alexander Walker	Sergeant 2nd class, Queensland Police Force	Constable 1/c Gregory Olive of Kelvin Grove Police Station undertook a routine inquiry at a residence on 19 February 1962. After knocking at the door, the door swung open and a 47-year-old unemployed labourer fatally fired a .303 calibre rifle into Olive's chest. The sergeant attended, and ordered the labourer to surrender. After shots were fired by both parties, the door was kicked open, and the officer overpowered and disarmed the male. The offender was gaoled for life for wilful murder.	1963
Leonard Ford (formerly Sykes)	Electrician/Civilian	Mr. Ford was working in his employer's premises when he was told that people were trapped on the upper floors of a building which was on fire. He hurried to the building where his work-mates had brought across a 3-section extension ladder to rescue a woman who was trapped on the top floor. Ford extended this ladder manually to its full extent by climbing up it, bouncing it against the face of the building and pushing up the extensions as he climbed. When he reached the head of the ladder, which was resting between two ornamental cornices fronting the left-hand windows on the third floor, he realised that he could not carry the woman down because the ladder was not long enough, despite the fact that it was in a nearly vertical position. The woman was in extreme difficulty, enveloped in smoke from the waist up and was on the point of collapse. With his right foot on the second rung of the ladder from the top, Ford placed his left foot on the cornice and held the woman against the face of the building. At this stage she partially collapsed on to him, causing him to lose his balance. With his free hand he grabbed at the top rung of the ladder and regained his equilibrium, at the same time supporting the dead weight of the woman across his shoulders. By this time the Brigade had arrived and a fire escape had been pitched and extended near the ladder. With very great difficulty and danger to himself, Mr. Ford managed to transfer the inert body of • the woman to members of the Brigade who had reached the head of the escape. She was then carried safely to the ground.	1960
Charles William Smith	Major, Royal Army Ordnance Corps	On the evening of Friday, 25 June 1965, a Belgian ammunition train caught fire in a cutting near Minden. The 'train had been stopped and four of the wagons uncoupled but the fire increased and two of the wagons exploded scattering shells over a wide area. Major C. W. Smith, who was ait the time Senior Ammunition Technical Officer, No. 3 Detachment, No. 1 Ammunition Inspectorate, was telephoned as he was the ammunition adviser nearest to the scene, although still some 80 miles away. He immediately went to the accident with his second in command, Captain P. W. E. Istead. On arrival at the scene they found two of the wagons devastated and burning fiercely, whilst the adjoining wooden end of a third wagon was smouldering. The surrounding area was covered with burning propellant, exploded ammunition and a number of dangerously hot 90 millimetre shells, which might have exploded at any minute. The girders of the burning wagons were red hot in places and there were still a number of unexploded rounds in the wreckage. There was a large civilian house with a thatched roof within two hundred yards of the accident and despite the efforts of German Police a number of curious civilians were infiltrating into the area. A Royal Military Police Non-Commissioned Officer, Lance Corporal Moodie was trying to move a fire tender so that water could be played on the flames, but apart from this nothing had been done to prevent further explosions and the local fire brigade were reluctant to approach. Major Smith at once took charge of the situation. He first persuaded the fire brigade to move a tender to the top of the cutting overlooking the scene and play water on the burning end of the third wagon. Then with complete disregard for his own safety, helped by Captain Istead, he broke into the third wagon and was just in time to move the ammunition boxes away from the burning end before they too caught fire and precipitated a further explosion. Major Smith assisted by Captain Istead and Lance Corporal Moodie then uncoupled the third and fourth wagons each containing about 10 tons of 90 millimetre ammunition and moved them about 60 yards further down the track. Having thus prevented a 'further major explosion, Major Smith set about dealing with the other ammunition which lay in and around the burning wagons. In most cases the projectiles were separated from the cases but a number of complete rounds were stall in smouldering cardboard cylinders. Some of the projectiles were marked " Practice " but most_ of them had had all their markings burnt off, and were too hot to pick up with .the naked hand. They all had to be treated as suspect and it was considered that in view of the likelihood of further explosions and the difficulty of discovering whether the shells were high explosive or not, the ammunition would have to be cooled with water before clearance could commence. In order not to expose the local firemen to undue hazard Major Smith and Captain Istead handled the branch hose for the first 30 minutes of this operation. Subsequently, with the aid of a fatigue party all the ammunition was unloaded and removed. The whole operation took twelve hours to complete, from about nine in the evening when the officers arrived on the scene, until about nine thirty next morning when all .the ammunition had been cleared. Throughout this period, although he was well aware of the continuous danger of further explosions, Major Smith acted with utter disregard for his own safety	1966
Keith Roy Cottee	First Officer, Trans Australia Airlines	On 17 December 1967 First Officer Cottee, pilot of a Trans Australia Airlines Helicopter was engaged in search operations for the late Right Honourable Harold Holt, who had been reported missing after entering the sea at Cheviot Beach. During the afternoon, when a strong wind was causing a heavy swell and waves of over twenty feet, a small eighteen foot motor cabin cruiser, which was assisting in the search, was severely buffetted and overturned, throwing the three occupants into the sea. At this time, another helicopter hovering over the shoreline searching the rock pools, sped to the position of the men and ascertained that they were afloat. It was clear that two of the men were being swept towards the rocks, whilst the third man had managed to swim clear of the surf, towards a nearby lifeboat. First Officer Cottee, who had landed his helicopter on the beach, affixed a rope to the aircraft and in company with a lifesaver took off to attempt the rescue of the two men. He then lowered and manoeuvred the aircraft, conforming with the wave pattern and movement of the men in the water, so that one man in the water could loop the end of the rope around his body. At times the aircraft was no more than three to four feet above the water. The aircraft then rose and flew off to the waiting lifeboat where it hovered and lowered the rescued man into the boat. He then returned for the second man and, after two attempts repeated this action of rescue. First Officer Cottee, by his cool, calm and single minded bravery in the face of severe weather conditions, was instrumental in saving the lives of two men who most certainly would have been drowned.	1968

== 1970s ==
Name	Rank and Unit	Action/Citation	Year awarded
Geoffrey William Biddle	Explosives Officer, Metropolitan Police	Awarded to Major Biddle for his "outstanding gallantry and devotion to duty" in defusing four terrorist bombs, on 5 & 6 January and 19 May 1974, and 9 November 1975.	1976
David Michael Clements	Constable, Metropolitan Police	Called to a bank raid and confronted by three armed robbers, the officer was shot at several times and wounded whilst chasing the suspects in St John's Wood.	1976
Alan Clouter	Lieutenant, Royal Army Ordnance Corps	Assisted in defusing a 40lb bomb at the Europa Hotel	1972
Henry Dowswell	Inspector, Metropolitan Police	With Inspector Purnell and Sergeant McVeigh, he was involved in an operation which intercepted a Provisional IRA Active Service Unit and resulted in the Balcombe Street Siege.	1977
John Gaff	Lieutenant Colonel, British Army	Defused bombs at a railway signal box and on the railway track at Dunloy Halt, near Ballymoney, County Antrim, which involved nearly 15 hours of very hazardous work	1974
Arthur Howard Garner	Sergeant, Metropolitan Police	Pursued and overpowered a wanted criminal despite his ramming a police car, driving a car at the officers on foot, and firing a shotgun at the officers involved, in Shepperton.	1972
David John Garside	23913522 Sergeant Garside, 10th Battalion, the Parachute Regiment	On 11 July 1979, during recruit cadre training at Sennybridge, Sergeant Garside was supervising live grenade throwing. A recruit pulled the safety pin, released the handle, then panicked, holding the grenade rather than dropping it. Sergeant Garside tried to hustle him out of the throwing bay but four seconds later the grenade detonated, killing him and wounding the recruit. He was a good soldier and a great loss.	1980
John Leonard Graham	Detective senior constable, Queensland Police Force	In Brisbane, a mentally-ill male with a history of violence drove a car into a light pole before leaving the car with a knife threatening to kill himself. While unarmed, the officer continued to persuade the man to surrender his weapons (including the officer's revolver). After a distraction, the offender was overpowered.	1973
Peter Edwin Spencer Gurney	Warrant Officer Class 1, Royal Army Ordnance Corps	Awarded in recognition of outstanding bravery in Northern Ireland during the period 1 November 1972 to 31 January 1973. (see 1983 for award of bar)	1973
Mike Hailwood	Formula One Racing Driver	Hailwood pulled fellow driver Clay Regazzoni from his burning car during the 1973 South African Grand Prix at Kyalami, setting fire to his own race suit in the process.	1973
Donald Victor Henderson	Explosives Officer, Metropolitan Police	For defusing a bomb containing 25 lb (11 kg) of high explosive embedded with heavy metal coach screws on 13 October 1975. When later examined it was discovered that only two minutes to detonation remained on the timer.	1976
Michael Hills	Constable, Metropolitan Police	For his involvement in an incident involving a kidnap attempt on the Princess Anne in The Mall, in which Inspector Jim Beaton was awarded the George Cross. PC Hills, despite having been shot in the stomach used his personal radio to contact Cannon Row Police Station reporting the situation and calling for assistance.	1974
Raymond Peter Kiff	Constable, Metropolitan Police	Involved in chasing, overcoming and disarming a PIRA terrorist after an explosion and shooting on a train near West Ham station.	1977
Frederick James Duncan MacLaughlin	Petty Officer Medical Assistant, Royal Navy	For rescuing an injured civilian during rioting in Belfast, after being shot, and having a bullet lodged in his throat, and refusing treatment until the civilian under his care had been treated first.	1971
Hugh David McCormack	Lieutenant (Acting Captain), Royal Army Ordnance Corps	In recognition of outstanding bravery in Northern Ireland during the period 1 August to 31 October 1972.	1973
Murtagh Phillip McVeigh	Sergeant, Metropolitan Police	With Inspectors Purnell and Dowswell, involved in an operation which intercepted a Provisional IRA Active Service Unit and resulted in the Balcombe Street Siege.	1977
Gordon Meredith	Sergeant, Warwickshire and Coventry Constabulary	Whilst attending a break-in at the premises of a firearms dealer, he was shot in the leg and severely injured, yet disarmed an intruder who had just shot and fatally wounded a fellow police officer.	1973
Edward Henry Nurse	Inspector, Royal Ulster Constabulary	On the evening of 25 May 1971, when a bomb was thrown into the reception hall of the Springfield Road Police Station, Nurse and two other officers rapidly evacuated everyone present. Nurse remained until satisfied that everyone was clear, then having taken two children as far away as possible he threw himself over them to shield them from the blast.	1971
Brian Ernest Walter Pawley	Constable, Metropolitan Police	In March 1978 he wrestled with an armed and dangerous man, after receiving a gun shot wound in the chest, while saving a colleague from death in Bethnal Green.	1979
David Purley	Formula One Racing Driver	For his attempt to save the life of his fellow driver Roger Williamson from a burning racing car during the 1973 Dutch Grand Prix at Zandvoort.	1973
John Francis Purnell	Inspector, Metropolitan Police	With Inspector Dowswell and Sergeant McVeigh, involved in an operation which intercepted a Provisional IRA Active Service Unit and resulted in the Balcombe Street Siege.	1977
Ronald George Russell	Area Manager, Exclusive Office Cleaning, London	He witnessed the attempted kidnapping of Princess Anne, and tackled an armed man, who had already shot four men, punching him on the back of the head and face.	1974
Peter Slimon	Constable, Metropolitan Police	Slimon, an armed officer working for the Protection Service, was on his way to his post when encountered a bank robbery in progress. Inside the bank he confronted three armed raiders. One pointed a shotgun at him, and Slimon and the raider fired simultaneously. Slimon, although seriously wounded, then shot another raider as they ran out past him, then pursued them and saw them escape in a van. At this point more police officers arrived and Slimon was subsequently treated for gunshot wounds in his hands, arms and chest. Two of the thieves were wounded, one fatally.	1973
Emlyn Arthur Watkins	Inspector, Greater Manchester Police	On 1 July 1975 Watkins was shot in the stomach when he tackled three men who had pulled a gun in an Indian restaurant in Rusholme. When the men were arrested, it emerged they were part of a Provisional IRA Active Service Unit sent to assassinate North West VIPs. Watkins was seriously injured but survived. Five men, part of a Manchester-based PIRA unit, were arrested in the aftermath of the shooting and were jailed in 1976 for a total of 627 years.	1976

== 1980s ==
Name	Rank and Unit	Action/Citation	Year awarded
Yiu-nam Chiu (1949–14 February 2012)	Seaman, Royal Fleet Auxiliary, RFA Sir Galahad	On 8 June 1982, during the Falklands War, Chiu Yiu Nam's ship was bombed at Bluff Cove. He ignored imminent orders to abandon the ship to rescue ten men trapped in a fire in the bowels of the ship.	1983
John Edward Dillon	Able Seaman (Radar), Royal Navy, Ardent	On 21 May 1982, during the Falklands War, Dillon's ship was hit by bombs and he was knocked unconscious. When he came to he found that he was pinned to the deck by debris, the ship was on fire, and filling with thick smoke. Despite wounds to his back Dillon first freed himself, then another injured man trapped nearby, and pulled him to a hole in the side of the ship and into the water where they were both rescued by helicopter.	1982
Robin Jamieson Dudding †	Traffic officer, Ministry of Transport, Rotorua	On 7 April 1986 Traffic Officer Robin Dudding was on duty at Moose Lodge, near Rotorua, to ensure free passage for the Prime Minister of Singapore's motorcade when it left the Lodge for Rotorua. He waved down an oncoming truck and when it stopped a youth armed with a shotgun stepped out. The offender, who had held up a store in Rotoiti and commandeered several vehicles, forced Traffic Officer Dudding into his Ministry of Transport vehicle and then fired two shots at a Police constable also on duty at Moose Lodge. The two set off for Rotorua, Traffic Officer Dudding driving and the offender in the back seat. Almost certainly Traffic Officer Dudding made for Lake Rotorua in an attempt to buy time and to prevent the offender from reaching Rotorua. He stopped at the lake and was shot. Before being shot Traffic Officer Dudding had attempted to disarm the offender. Traffic Officer Dudding displayed outstanding bravery.	1987
Stephen Edward Farley	Constable, Metropolitan Police	For disarming a violent and mentally ill man who had made a suicide attempt and then threatened to shoot the police officers who were called to the scene.	1980
Peter Edwin Spencer Gurney	Explosives Officer, Metropolitan Police	Already MBE and GM (see 1973). Spencer was awarded a bar to his George Medal for disarming an explosive device on 26 October 1981, immediately after his colleague Kenneth Howorth had been killed by a similar bomb.	1983
Paul Anderson Henry †	Second Engineer Officer, Royal Fleet Auxiliary	On 8 June 1982, after RFA Sir Galahad had been bombed by Argentine aircraft during troop disembarkation in Fitzroy Creek, the engine room quickly filled with thick black smoke. Henry gave the only breathing apparatus to a Junior Engineer Officer, who managed to reach safety, but Henry perished.	1982
Kenneth Howorth †	Explosives Officer, Metropolitan Police	Killed on 26 October 1981 whilst dealing with a PIRA bomb in Oxford Street.	1983
Michael Julian Lakey	Flight Lieutenant, Royal Air Force, No. 202 Squadron	The captain of Sea King HAR.3 helicopter which rescued 22 persons from the ship MV Finneagle which was on fire in a severe storm off the north of Scotland during the night of 1/2 October 1980.	1981
Trevor James Lock	Constable, Diplomatic Protection Group, Metropolitan Police	For "gallantry and devotion to duty of an extremely high order" during the Iranian Embassy siege of 1980.	1981
Andrew Clifford Parker	Assistant Bank Manager, Nippon Credit International	For acting as a human bridge for fellow passengers when the ferry Herald of Free Enterprise capsized.	1987
David Hugh Pengelly	Sergeant, Metropolitan Police	Part of a team of officers protecting firemen during the Broadwater Farm riot in 1985, in which PC Keith Blakelock was killed. Blakelock and ten other officers were awarded the Queen's Gallantry Medal.	1988
Derek Ian Pickless	Constable, Queensland Police Force	On 29 February 1984 at North Rockhampton went to a domestic violence matter with Constable Michael Leslie Low. On arrival, Low knocked on the front door and was hit in the chest by a shotgun blast. Pickless dragged Low to safety, and while under fire and returning fire, went to the car to radio for help. He returned to Low, who subsequently died. He is the eleventh known awardee of the department.	1986
Michael Ian Skippen†	Head Waiter, Herald of Free Enterprise	Died while attempting to get passengers to safety when the ship capsized.	1987
Laurence Slater	Petty Officer Aircrewman, Royal Navy, 771 Naval Air Squadron	Slater was the duty diver of a Search and Rescue Wessex helicopter, which on 11 August 1985, in severe gale conditions, rescued a total of 29 persons from two yachts.	1985
Colin Townsley†	Station Officer, London Fire and Civil Defence Authority	During the King's Cross fire of 18 November 1987 Townsley, with total disregard for his own safety, remained within the concourse without breathing apparatus to assist passengers to escape until he was overcome by intense smoke and heat.	1989
Kevin Anthony Tomlinson	Security Officer, Sunderland Public Works Department, Tyne and Wear.	On Monday, 23 March 1987, Mr. Tomlinson was a member of the crew of an armoured transit vehicle making a cash delivery to a bank. On arriving at the rear of the bank, Mr. Tomlinson alighted from the armoured van and remained with the vehicle, while a second colleague, the driver, entered the bank to make arrangements for the Delivery. The third security officer remained locked in the rear of the van. At a given point he released the cash to Mr. Tomlinson who was immediately confronted and attacked by two men armed with a sawn-off shotgun and a pickaxe handle. Mr. Tomlinson's colleague, seeing the attack as he returned from the bank, ran to give assistance. He and Mr. Tomlinson were then threatened with the shotgun and re-entered the armoured van for safety. The robbers made off with two bags containing cash, escaping on a motorcycle, with the security van in pursuit. During the chase the security van managed to ram the motorcycle, bringing both robbers down. As they fled across a building site, Mr. Tomlinson got down from the security van to give chase on foot, while his colleague drove on in an attempt to intercept the robbers on the far side of the building site. At one point one of the robbers fired the shotgun at Mr. Tomlinson, but the gun did not discharge. Mr. Tomlinson continued to pursue both men, catching up with and detaining one of them. A violent struggle ensued. The second robber, tried to free his accomplice by striking Mr. Tomlinson about the head several times with the shotgun. During the course of this attack, Mr. Tomlinson was fatally shot in the head at point-blank range. The gunmen escaped in a stolen car but were subsequently arrested. Mr. Tomlinson, knowing that the robbers were armed, displayed selfless determination and gallantry of a high order by pursuing them on foot without any protection himself, and apprehending one of them before being fatally shot.	1989

== See also ==
- List of recipients of the George Medal for other decades
