= List of recipients of the George Medal, 1950s =

The George Medal is awarded by the United Kingdom and Commonwealth of Nations for acts of great bravery; over 2,000 medals have been awarded since its inception in September 1940. Below is set out a selection of recipients of the award, during the 1950s. A person's presence in this list does not suggest their award was more notable than any other award of the George Medal.

Where a recipient has received a second George Medal, a picture of the ribbon bearing the bar symbol is shown.

== Gallery ==
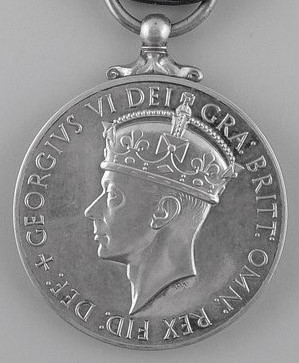
George VI, 1948 to 1952. Inscribed GEORGIVS VI DEI: GRA: BRITT: OMN: REX FID: DEF:

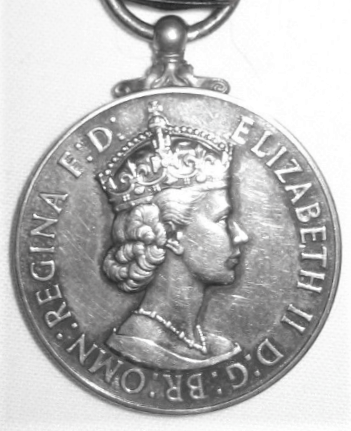
Elizabeth II, 1952 to late 1950s. Inscribed ELIZABETH II D: G: BR: OMN: REGINA F.D.

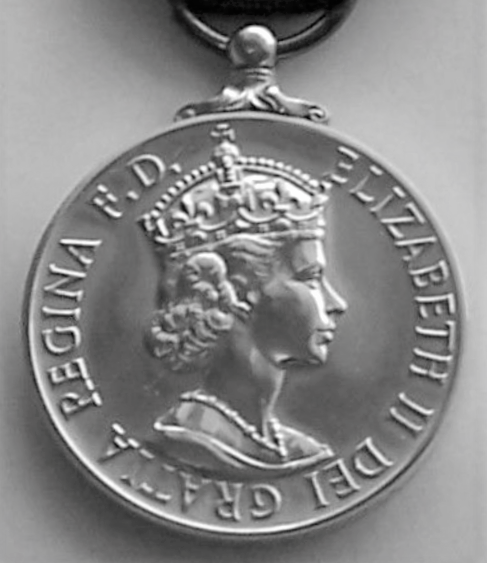
Elizabeth II, late 1950s to date. Inscribed ELIZABETH II DEI GRATIA REGINA F.D.

== 1950s ==
ARTHUR HILTON British 5th Army - During an operation in Celle in Germany the lorry he was travelling in skidded and went off a bridge into the River Aller. Even though he could not swim, he dived underneath the truck to rescue 2 men trapped in the cabin, unfortunately being unable to find his friend who was in the back of the lorry with himself, who was later found drowned underneath the vehicle

Name	Rank and unit	Action/citation	Year awarded
William Anderson	Column Officer, National Fire Service, Glasgow	Anderson was one of three fire officers awarded the GM for "showing utter disregard of their own safety in making persistent attempts to save the lives of the trapped men..." in a fire at a cabinet-makers at Ballater Street, Glasgow.	1953
Ramadhani Athumani	Constable, Tanganyika Police Force	When 22 Masai and Waarush tribesmen ran away when a lion sprang and started to maul a government veterinary officer, the constable attacked a fully grown lion with the butt of his rifle as a club. After seizing the constable's right arm and a violent struggle, the lion ran off; saving the veterinary officer's life.	1957
David Frederick Alfred Bloom	Assistant superintendent, Marine Branch, Trinidad and Tobago Police Force	A wooden schooner with 8000 gallons of fuel caught fire in a heavily congested part of the Port of Spain harbour. Despite the probability of an explosion, the police launch with the port services tug moved the schooner in darkness to waste land. Bloom boarded the vessel to do fire fighting. He was in the gravest danger of being killed immediately, while demonstrating calm and cool leadership. Chief Fire Officer Ronald Godfrey Cox was also awarded the George Medal.	1957
Keith Trevor Burdett	Constable, Metropolitan Police	Three males were trying to steal a car, but ran off when the officer approached. After telephoning for assistance, with other officers he sought to apprehend a dangerous criminal. When trying to climb a wall, the officer was shot at several times, resulting in injuries. Four other officers were awarded the British Empire Medal.	1956
Allassan Busanga	Corporal, Gold Coast Police Reserve	Busanga was one of eight police officers who, armed only with batons, faced down a hostile crowd estimated at 2,000 on the bridge near Elmina Castle. While engaging the rioters Busanga received severe gunshot wounds in the head and body.	1953
Wilfred Cain	Constable, Nottingham City Police	Shortly after midnight Cain saw a man in the river near Trent Bridge, Nottingham, and heard a call for help. Using the headlights from a patrol car Cain swam to the rescue. The man was about 150 feet (46 m) from the bank, and the river, between 12–15 feet (3.7–4.6 m) in depth, was running with a very strong current. The water was also extremely cold and the man struggled continuously. Cain, however, swam with him for about 350 yards (320 m) until reaching the river bank.	1953
Robert Campbell	Constable, Dumfries and Galloway Constabulary	For disarming and arresting Robert Dobie Smith, after Smith had shot dead fellow police officer William Gibson while the officers were on duty. Smith was hanged in Saughton, Edinburgh, in September 1951.	1951
Chew Kim Chuan	Inspector, Federation of Malaya Police Force	For outstanding gallantry in action against communist terrorists, and responsible for the capture of the leaders of many gangs. On one occasion he undertook, unarmed, an operation which involved facing terrorists armed with sten guns, rifles, and hand grenades, and after a fierce hand-to-hand struggle succeeded in overcoming them and bringing them to justice.	1956
Thomas Vivian Chisnall	Farmer, Gwelo, Southern Rhodesia	When an aircraft crashed into some trees after overshooting the runway at Thornhill airfield, Chisnall, who lived nearby, rushed to the scene. The aircraft was on fire and the pilot, badly injured and unconscious, was still strapped into the cockpit. Chisnall attempted to release him, but was driven back by the flames. A neighbour, Mr. Richard Walton Fores Cox, a garage manager, then arrived and attempted to cut the pilot free with his penknife, but was also driven back. Chisnall, using a coat and hat as a shield, returned several times to the aircraft and using Cox's knife eventually managed to cut the pilot free, and he and Cox dragged him away from the wreckage and administered first aid. Cox was subsequently awarded the British Empire Medal.	1953
Bruce Desmond Christofferson	Detective, New Zealand Police Force	For tackling two youths armed with rifles, suspected of robbery, during which he was shot in the chest. The two fled the scene, but were subsequently arrested.	1953
Osmund Ertmann 'Ossie' Cislowski	Constable #4598, Queensland Police Force	On 10 August 1954, Cislowski was shot by a revolver in the chest, left hip, and right leg when seeking to arrest a 24-year-old male labourer, in Denham Street, Townsville. He continued to chase and arrest the offender after being shot. The constable was assisted by fellow Constable #4035 Earle Leonard Needham, who was invested with the British Empire Medal (Civil Division). Offender later sentenced to 14 years gaol, additional to matters of burglary. Cislowski was the first Queensland officer to get the medal.	1956
Leo Lewis Clarke	Stoker	Picked up and ran with a bomb that was about to explode, throwing it clear of his colleagues, and thereby sustaining injuries to his hand. Also received the Order of Industrial Heroism.	1950
Leslie Robert Colquhoun	Civil Test Pilot, Vickers-Armstrongs Supermarine Works	In May 1950 Colquhoun was flying an Attacker to test the effectiveness of the air brakes. On the third of two dives the outer portion of the starboard wing folded up and the ailerons became locked. Colquhoun decided not to eject and made a high-speed landing at Chilbolton airfield, saving the aircraft so that the cause could be discovered.	1950
Ronald Godfrey Cox	Chief Fire Officer, Trinidad and Tobago Fire Services	A wooden schooner with 8000 gallons of fuel caught fire in a heavily congested part of the Port of Spain harbour. Despite the probability of an explosion, the police launch with the port services tug moved the schooner in darkness to waste land. Long efforts resulted in the extinguishing of the blaze. Police assistant superintendent David Frederick Alfred Bloom was also awarded the George Medal.	1957
Dama Dagarti	Sergeant, Gold Coast Police Reserve	Sergeant Dagarti was one of eight police officers who, armed only with batons, faced down a hostile crowd estimated at 2,000 on the bridge near Elmina Castle. Shots were fired from the crowd killing the Commanding Officer and mortally wounding another constable. Dagarti took command and engaged the crowd with batons. In a short period of time all except Dagarti were wounded, preventing them from taking further part in the action, but he continued to engage the crowd single-handed until reinforcements arrived.	1953
Leonard Deptford	Constable, Lincolnshire Constabulary	During notorious flooding across parts of the country, the officer entered a two-story house, roped together seven people sheltering upstairs, and let them to safety, with 'his cheerful determination and competent handling of the desperate situation'.	1953
Lawrence Silvester Dick	Junior Nurse, Ministry of Health, Gold Coast	For going to the assistance of police officers who had been shot by rioters, whilst under fire.	1953
George Arthur Dorsett	Constable, Metropolitan Police	Awarded for disarming a man armed with a pistol who had already shot at another officer. Awarded a bar to the GM for disarming a man with a shotgun.	1953; 1959
Hugh Douglas	Police Constable, Nottingham City Police	Saved a young child from a burning house after the flames had forced three others from attempting a rescue.	1950
David George Ensor	Civil Servant, Ministry of Labour and National Insurance, Northern Ireland	For pursuing armed robbers on foot and by car.	1953
Oswald Falconar	Colour Sergeant, Royal Marines	On 17 May 1953 at RAF Luqa, Malta, an aircraft, carrying men from 40 Commando crashed on takeoff. The Marines evacuated the aircraft as flames and smoke swept through, but Falconar realized that one man was trapped by his safety belt. He turned back from the exit to release him, and once outside, despite his burnt hands, helped the man to tear off his burning clothing.	1953
Augustus James Voisey Fletcher	Assistant Superintendent of Police, Area Special Branch Officer, Kuala Pilah and Bahau Districts, Negri Sembilan, Federation of Malaya	A series of highly successful and interconnected operations were carried out by a combined Police and Military Unit against Communist Terrorists in the Kuala Pilah and Bahau Police Districts of Negri Sembilan. These operations, which included assaults on two occupied Terrorist camps, were carried out by night with great daring and determination under hazardous conditions and in extremely difficult terrain. They culminated in the surrender of three, the capture of four, and the killing of three Communist Terrorists. Fletcher displayed outstanding coolness, reliability and gallantry in the face of grave personal danger on several separate occasions during these operations.	1957
Alexander Forsythe	Constable, Royal Ulster Constabulary	Together with Woman Sergeant Maud Musselwhite (who was awarded the British Empire Medal), working the dock area of Derry for likely targets by terrorists, located three male persons. Forsythe followed and detained the men and extinguished a lit fuse attached to gelignite. An explosion occurred soon after.	1957
Acton Henry Gordon Gibbon	Captain, Royal Regiment of Artillery	Awarded in recognition of his long-sustained courage as a prisoner during the Korean War. In May 1951, Gibbon helped three officers to escape, resulting in his "vigorous interrogation" in the camp reserved for this treatment near Pyongyang, known as "Pak's Palace" after its commandant, Major Pak.	1951
Brian Gibbons	Schoolboy	After being awoken by the 1958 Independent Air Travel Vickers Viking crash in Southall in 1959 and despite sustaining severe burns to his body, managed to save his infant nephew from the resulting house fires caused by the crash. He is the youngest male recipient.	1959
George Alfred Harrison	Shop Assistant, Jaeger & Co., Birmingham	For showing outstanding devotion to duty and courage. His determination and persistence, although injured, were the means of bringing a dangerous gang of criminals to justice.	1950
Goh Chin Hee	Inspector, Special Branch Police Department	For showing great bravery in capturing four Communist Party of Malaya (CPM) members.	1957
Ian Henderson	Superintendent, Kenya Police	Henderson was first awarded the medal in 1954 for his work attempting to arrange meetings between Government representatives and the Mau Mau, and received a second award in 1955. In 1957 General Sir Gerald Lathbury when wrote that "Ian Henderson has probably done more than any single individual to bring the Emergency to an end".	1954; 1955
Freda Holland	Night Sister, Dellwood Maternity Home, Reading	For saving 15 newborn babies in a fire on 18 April 1954.	1954
Frederick Leslie Jones	Constable, New South Wales Police	For disarming a man armed with a rifle.	1953
Freeman Kilpatrick	Staff Sergeant, United States Air Force, 47th Bombardment Wing	While stationed at RAF Sculthorpe, Norfolk, he was cited for rescuing 18 people in floods in East Anglia on 31 January 1953.	1953
John Rodney Lees	Flight Sergeant, Royal Air Force Mountain Rescue Service	Rescued an injured British Army officer, Major Hugh Robertson, from the Welsh mountain, Craig yr Ysfa, in winter by carrying him down the rock face on his back while being lowered, and while the major was struggling in delirium, in the dark.	1958
Reis Leming	Airman 2nd class, United States Air Force, 67th Air Rescue Squadron	While stationed at RAF Sculthorpe, he saved the lives of 27 people in floods in East Anglia on 31 January 1953 by venturing alone on a small rubber raft in the dark.	1953
Yiu Tong Leung	Detective Corporal, Special Branch, Hong Kong Police Force	Corporal Leung was attacked by two men in Grampian Road, Kowloon, and was despite being shot in the stomach returned fire, wounding one assailant. The second man fled, but was pursued by Leung for about a quarter of a mile, finally catching up with him on some waste ground. The man drew a knife, but Leung subdued and arrested him and took him into custody, before he eventually collapsed. (Chinese naming format: Leung Yiu Tong)	1953
Charles Lewis	Inspector, Lincolnshire Constabulary	The Mablethorpe police station was entirely surrounded by water, during notorious flooding across parts of the country. Upon hearing cries, the inspector exited the station by the window, caught in a torrent, and rescued two elderly persons. He continued without a break for 54 hours.	1953
Stanley McArdle	Lieutenant-Commander, Royal Navy, HMS Contest	Following the sinking of the MV Princess Victoria Contest came upon a survivor clinging to a liferaft, clearly exhausted. Despite heavy seas McArdle dived overboard and dragged him back to the ship.	1953
Allan Thomas MacKay	Constable #5314, Queensland Police Force	At Jandowae, a dispute in a workers camp saw one man killed by a rifle by another. After threats, the constable attended, and engaged the offender in conversation. With a rifle pointed directly at him, a sudden rush and a violent struggle saw the offender overcome and arrested. MacKay is the third officer of the Force to be awarded a George Medal.	1958
James Melvin	Divisional Officer, National Fire Service, Glasgow	Melvin was one of three fire officers awarded the GM for "showing utter disregard of their own safety in making persistent attempts to save the lives of the trapped men..." in a fire at a cabinet-makers at Ballater Street, Glasgow.	1953
Robert Gordon Morgan	Flight Lieutenant, Royal Canadian Air Force	Rescued a pilot from a burning F86 Sabre on 21 July 1955 at No. 1 Fighter Wing, Marville, France. With ammunition exploding and while standing on the wing which had a partially filled fuel tank, he along with Leading Aircraftman Harry John Waters were able to pull the pilot from the wreckage.	1957
William Robert Morrow	Sergeant, Royal Ulster Constabulary	The sergeant was asleep in a bedroom of the Royal Ulster Constabulary Station at Rosslea, County Fermanagh, when armed offenders placed gelignite near the guardroom. After the explosion, the offenders with automatic weapons entered the station and commenced shooting. Morrow showed coolness in giving instructions, and taking on the task to repel the offenders with complete disregard for personal safety.	1956
Kanda Msiko	Mine Boss Boy, Mindola Mine, Kitwe, Northern Rhodesia	For saving the lives of two fellow miners on 11 October 1950.	1950
Tenzing Norgay	Mountaineer, Nepal	For his part in the first ascent to the summit of Mount Everest.	1953
David Walker Park	Deputy Labour Director, Scottish Division, National Coal Board	During the Knockshinnoch mining accident of September 1950, over 100 men were trapped below ground. An escape route was made through disused workings to the trapped men, but parts were heavily charged with inflammable gas. Park volunteered to enter the mine, joining the trapped men and instructing them in the use of breathing apparatus, and organising their escape. When the last of the men had been rescued he stayed behind to lead a search party to ensure that no one had been left behind.	1951
Menggong anak Panggit	Iban Tracker, Johor, Federation of Malaya	Menggong was second in command of an Iban platoon patrolling in the Labis area of Segamat, Johor. While attacking a bandit camp the Lieutenant in command was killed, and Menggong assumed command. Seizing a Bren gun and under heavy fire he rushed into the enemy camp, while his men, inspired by his example, charged. Although outnumbered by more than two to one, they fought until the bandits were forced to withdraw. Menggong then organised a search of the area, and only when this proved fruitless did he order the withdrawal of his platoon.	1953
Anthony Hart Piercy	Constable, Lincolnshire Constabulary	A man who had threatened to shoot his wife, took a rifle and ammunition and as his wife ran out of the house, shot at her. Sergeant Savage and Constable Mayes of the Lincolnshire Constabulary arrived and tried to reason with the man, but he shot at both of them inflicting a flesh wound on Savage and hitting Mayes in the leg. He then ran out of the house with the two policemen following as best they could. Constable Anthony Hart Piercy entered the street and saw the man approaching him with the rifle held near his hip and the two policemen following him. The man threatened to shoot Piercy but Piercy ignored him and walked forward to within a few yards of him. The man then fired at him and as he brought the gun to bear for another shot Piercy jumped forward, brought him to the ground and restrained him until help arrived. In September 1952 Piercy became the first Lincolnshire policemen to be awarded the George Medal for gallantry.	1952
Eric Joseph Rippon	Sergeant, New South Wales Police	For disarming a man armed with a shotgun.	1953
Anthony Alfred James Rivers	Lampman, British Transport Commission, Western Region	For saving a woman who was trapped on the line at Cradley Heath railway station.	1955
Bernard Edward Ruck	Assistant Superintendent, Kenya Police	For conspicuous gallantry and devotion to duty in a series of incidents over a long period during attempted negotiations with the Mau Mau in the Mount Kenya area. He received a bar to the GM in 1955 for conspicuous gallantry and devotion to duty over a period of three months making and maintaining contact with Mau Mau leaders. Ruck made thirty-four visits to the forest as a member of a team, usually only three strong, which had to enter unarmed for talks. He knew that there were a number of armed Mau Mau in the vicinity, and on occasions these showed themselves and more than once adopted an aggressive and provocative attitude. Despite this Ruck calmly continued to do his duty.	1954; 1955
Frederick Sadd	Leading fireman, Great Yarmouth Fire Brigade	During notorious flooding across parts of the country, houses at Gorleston were in water more than 5 feet (1.5 m), Sadd waded and swan house-to-house in darkness, reassuring the occupants.	1953
John Christopher Strickfuss	Constable 1st class #4420, Queensland Police Force	Based at Cannon Hill, Brisbane, the officer responded to rifle shots from a house nearby. From a now-burning house, while intending fire-fighting, shots were discharged at the off-duty officer. Finding the bodies of four deceased persons, a now-deceased male, and a baby, he extinguished the fire. He showed great devotion to duty and courage in the face of extreme danger. Second officer of the department to receive the George Medal.	1957
John Swanson	Assistant Firemaster, National Fire Service, Glasgow	Swanson was one of three fire officers awarded the GM for "showing utter disregard of their own safety in making persistent attempts to save the lives of the trapped men..." in a fire at a cabinet-makers at Ballater Street, Glasgow.	1953
Anthony Trevor Taylor	Sergeant, Royal Army Ordnance Corps	On 7 October 1956, Sergeant Taylor, the Ammunition Examiner attached to an infantry brigade during the Cyprus Emergency, was called on deal with time bombs located in a practically completed new Police Station. On arrival he was informed that three bombs had already exploded, the last only ten minutes before, doing considerable damage. He entered the building, finding a fourth bomb concealed in the wall beneath the stairs. Taylor, with some difficulty, removed a time pencil, which operated harmlessly in his hand while he was removing the bomb. In the previous six months Taylor had dealt with no less than ten similar time bombs and many home-made bombs and grenades which he had examined and rendered safe.	1956
Samuel Turkington	Postman, Glasgow	For intervening in an attempted armed robbery of a sub-Post Office on Tollcross Road, Glasgow, and grappling with, and then pursuing, an armed man, who was eventually overpowered and arrested by two police officers.	1953
Wilfred Warren	Chief Petty Officer, Royal Navy, HMS Contest	Assisted Lieutenant-Commander Stanley McArdle in saving a survivor from the sunken ferry MV Princess Victoria.	1953
Harry John Waters	Leading Aircraftman, Royal Canadian Air Force	For assisting in the rescue of a pilot from a burning F86 Sabre on 21 July 1955 at No. 1 Fighter Wing, Marville, France. Waters helped Robert Morgan pull the injured pilot from the wreckage.	1955
Douglas Albert Muncaster	Lieutenant - Royal Canadian Navy	"Lieutenant Muncaster, with complete disregard for his own safety, was instrumental in saving the life of a pilot who was trapped inside his flaming aircraft after it had crashed. On the afternoon of 9 March 1955, Lieutenant Muncaster was the co-pilot of a Bell Helicopter which had arrived at the site of an aircraft crash, about one mile south of the Royal Canadian Naval Air Station, Shearwater, Nova Scotia. The aircraft--a Sea Fury, piloted by Sub-Lieutenant(P) J.V. Searle, R.C.N., 0-65687--had crashed about three minutes earlier, in a heavily wooded area, and it was noted that it had broken in two, the forward section, including the cockpit, being inverted, with the engine on fire. He Helicopter could not land owing to the density of the trees and undergrowth. The pilot, therefore, hovered about fifty yards from the aircraft, where the wood were more sparse, while Lieutenant Muncaster jumped to the ground from a height of about eight feet. As Lieutenant Muncaster ran towards the wreckage, one of the fuel tanks exploded. On nearing the forward section of the aircraft, from sound inside the cockpit, he realized that the pilot was alive. The Perspex canopy of the cockpit was resting on the ground and pilot was pinned inside. Being unable to open the canopy or break the Perspex with his hands or feet, Lieutenant Muncaster found a rock and smashed a hole in it. By this time the flames had reached the cockpit and there was imminent danger of the remaining fuel tanks exploding. The pilot was able to push his head and shoulders through the hole made in the canopy by Lieutenant Muncaster who, after considerable pulling, extricated Sub-Lieutenant Searle from the flaming cockpit and assisted him from the immediate vicinity of the aircraft. The remaining fuel tanks exploded a few minutes later."	1955
William Arthur Waterton	Chief Test Pilot, Gloster Aircraft Company	He landed the prototype Gloster Javelin aircraft after flutter had destroyed the elevators, thereby saving important information.	1952
Humphry Michael Woolrych	Lieutenant, Royal Navy (Emergency) HMS/M Sirdar	At 1934 on 25th June, 1952, H.M. Submarine SIRDAR sighted a large curtain of flame about one mile away. She surfaced and found this to be the wreckage of a Shackleton aircraft which had burst into flames on hitting the sea. As the submarine approached the flames one of the crew was seen to toe waving from a position close to the northern edge of the burning wreckage. No boat was carried onboard the submarine, and Lieutenant Woolrych volunteered to swim to the survivor. At 1940 he swam to the man, who was injured, and brought him safely back to the submarine. A second member of the crew was then sighted to the south of the flames and about five yards from the most intense area of fire. At 1954 Lieutenant Woolrych again dived overboard and, disregarding his own safety, swam to this survivor. Owing to the proximity of the flames it was necessary to tow Lieutenant Woolrych and the airman from the vicinity. The airman, who was suffering from severe burns of the face and hands, was most skilfully brought onboard the submarine by Lieutenant Woolrych. The airmen undoubtedly owe their lives to the speed and skill with which Lieutenant Woolrych recovered them from the sea.	1952

== See also ==
- List of recipients of the George Medal for other decades
