= List of recipients of the George Medal, 1990s–2020s =

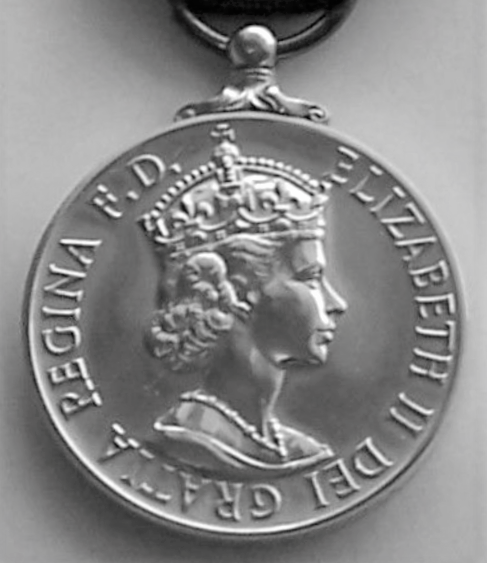
Elizabeth II, late 1950s to date. Inscribed: "ELIZABETH II DEI GRATIA REGINA F.D."

The George Medal is awarded by the United Kingdom and Commonwealth of Nations for acts of great bravery; over 2,000 medals have been awarded since its inception in September 1940. Below is set out a selection of recipients of the award, since 1990. A person's presence in this list does not suggest their award was more notable than any other award of the George Medal.

Where a recipient has received a second GM, a picture of the ribbon bearing the bar symbol is shown. In December 1977 the provisions for the medal were altered, allowing it to be awarded posthumously, in which case the "†" symbol appears next to the recipient's name.

== 1990s ==
Name	Rank and Unit	Action/Citation	Year awarded
Jack Crawshaw†	Civilian	For trying to rescue a girl from an ice covered lake at Hemsworth, West Yorkshire.	1996
Eva Helen Dickson	Civilian, Aramoana, New Zealand.	Dickson was an elderly woman who had recently had a hip replacement and was unable to walk unassisted, but after being shot at during the Aramoana massacre, she crawled on her hands and knees into her house to telephone for help, then crawled back out to assist a neighbour who had been shot, then crawled back inside to call emergency services a second time.	1990
Timothy Charles Rohan Goggs†	Operations Officer, The HALO Trust	While engaged in mine clearing operations in Afghanistan, though injured himself, he re-entered a mine clearing tank that was on fire, to rescue colleagues. He died later in hospital from additional injuries sustained in the rescue.	1992
Royd Philip Kennedy	Senior Fire Fighter, New Zealand Fire Service	For rescuing a girl who was trapped underneath an overturned trailer loaded with petrol.	1992
Alan James Knapp	Detective Sergeant, Metropolitan Police	With Detective Sergeant Stephen Thomas, Knapp was involved in an operation to arrest armed men attempting to rob a post office. Both were shot and seriously wounded, but continued their endeavours to arrest the culprits.	1992
Michael Clive Mee†	Station Officer, South Yorkshire Fire Service	For trying to rescue a girl from an ice covered lake at Hemsworth, West Yorkshire.	1996
Lisa Potts	Nursery Nurse, St. Luke's Church of England School, Blakenhall, Wolverhampton	For protecting children in her care from a machete attack.	1997
Stephen Thomas	Detective Sergeant, Metropolitan Police	With Detective Sergeant Alan Knapp, Thomas was involved in an operation to arrest armed men attempting to rob a post office. Both were shot and seriously wounded, but continued their endeavours to arrest the culprits.	1992

== 2000s ==
Name	Rank and Unit	Action/Citation	Year awarded
Andrew Lee Barlow	Fusilier, 2nd Battalion, The Royal Regiment of Fusiliers	Awarded "in recognition of gallant and distinguished services in Afghanistan during the period 1 October 2006 to 31 March 2007."	2007
Vance Willis	Staff Sergeant, 1st Battalion Scots Guards	Awarded "in recognition of gallant and distinguished services in Afghanistan during the period 1 October 2001 to 31 March 2002."	2005
Mark Davies	Officer with 29 Explosive Ordnance Disposal Search Group	Awarded GM after he neutralised numerous explosive devices in Northern Ireland where the risk to his own life was extremely high.	2003
Adam Modd	Warrant Officer with 321 EOD	Awarded GM after he neutralised numerous improvised explosive devices in Northern Ireland where the risk to his own life was extremely high.	2002
Stuart Walter Dickson	Staff Sergeant, Royal Logistic Corps	Awarded "in recognition of gallant and distinguished services in Afghanistan during the period 1 April to 30 September 2008."	2009
Paul Hartley	Lance Corporal, Royal Army Medical Corps	Awarded "in recognition of gallant and distinguished services in Afghanistan during the period 1 April to 30 September 2006."	2006
Michael Liam Brady Miller†	Firefighter, Hertfordshire Fire and Rescue Service	In February 2005 a fire broke out in a 14th floor flat in Stevenage. Miller and Jeffrey Wornham went up first to assess the situation while their colleagues prepared equipment and water. When cries were heard from inside Miller and Wornham entered the flat and rescued a man, who indicated that his girlfriend was still inside. Both firefighters then re-entered the flat despite intense heat and zero visibility, but were killed. Both firefighters were awarded the GM posthumously.	2007
Gary O'Donnell †	Warrant Officer Class 2, Royal Logistic Corps	Bomb disposal expert who received the GM and Bar, and was killed in Afghanistan in 2008.	2006 2009
Andrew Pennington†	Councillor, Gloucestershire County Council	Died saving the life of Cheltenham MP Nigel Jones when they were attacked by a man with a samurai sword.	2001
Justin Michael Priestley	Captain, Royal Logistic Corps	For "conspicuous gallantry whilst engaged on explosive ordnance disposal work in the United Kingdom".	2000
Mark Jonathan Skipp	Colour Sergeant, Parachute Regiment	Awarded "in recognition of gallant and distinguished services in Afghanistan during the period 1 October 2001 to 31 March 2002".	2005
Kevin Ivison	Captain, Royal Logistic Corps	Awarded a George Medal for risking his life in Al Amarah, Maysaan Province, Iraq on 28 February. His MoD citation said: "Aware that his actions would probably result in his death, Captain Ivison donned his specialist protective equipment. He passed what he feared would be his last messages to his loved ones, to his number two operator."	2006
Eliza Ward†	Cafe Manager, Belfast	Aged 18, she was fatally stabbed in the chest after she confronted a kitchen porter who was attacking the female owner of a city centre restaurant in July 1997.	2000
William Deacon†	Winchman, HM Coastguard	Awarded posthumously for actions during the rescue of crew from a shipwrecked vessel, MV Green Lily off the coast of Shetland on 19 November 1997. Deacon was lowered onto the deck of the vessel from a rescue helicopter and ten crew were winched off the vessel. Deacon was the last person on board when he was swept overboard and killed.	2000
Anthony John Doherty†	Boatman, Fast Rescue Craft	Awarded posthumously for attempts made to rescue a man who had fallen into the sea from a North Sea gas rig.	2000

== 2010s ==
Name	Rank and Unit	Action/Citation	Year awarded
Martin Simon George Bell †	Private, Parachute Regiment	Awarded "in recognition of gallant and distinguished services in Afghanistan during the period 1 October 2010 to 31 March 2011.	2011
Ian Andrew Dibell†	Constable, Essex Police	Killed while attempting to disarm an armed and dangerous assailant whilst off duty.	2013
Ignacio Echeverría†	Lawyer; Banker	"For confronting armed terrorists to protect others" during the London Bridge and Borough Market terrorist attack on 3 June 2017. Mr Echeverria confronted multiple armed terrorists with only his skateboard as a weapon. He succeeded in diverting the terrorists' attention to himself and was fatally wounded.	2018
Martin G. Finney	Firearms Officer, National Crime Agency	For tackling an armed assailant in Tottenham, London in May 2014.	2017
Charlie Guenigault	Constable, Metropolitan Police	"For confronting armed terrorists to protect others" during the London Bridge and Borough Market terrorist attack on 3 June 2017. PC Guenigault was off duty, unarmed and had no personal protective equipment.	2018
Paul Raymond Jacobs	Rifleman, The Rifles	Awarded "in recognition of gallant services in Afghanistan during the period 1 April to 30 September 2009.	2010
Bernard Carter Kenny	Civilian	Injured while intervening in the murder of Jo Cox	2017
Karl Ley	Staff Sergeant, Royal Logistic Corps	Made safe 139 improvised explosive devices (IEDs) planted by the Taliban during a tour of Helmand Province, Afghanistan.	2010
Brett George Linley †	Staff Sergeant, Royal Logistic Corps	Awarded "in recognition of gallant services in Afghanistan during the period 1 April to 30 September 2010".	2011
Wayne Marques	Constable, British Transport Police	"For confronting armed terrorists to protect others" during the London Bridge and Borough Market terrorist attack on 3 June 2017.	2018
Ian Thomas Molyneux†	Lieutenant Commander, Royal Navy Submarine Service	With complete disregard for his own safety, he deliberately made an effort to tackle a gunman on board HMS Astute. The shooting happened while Southampton's mayor, Royston Smith, and other dignitaries were touring the Royal Navy's hunter-killer nuclear submarine. He was shot in the head at very close range and died.	2012
Alistair Klaas Neill	Chief Executive, Southampton City Council	For tackling and subduing a gunman on HMS Astute.	2012
Keith Palmer†	Constable, Metropolitan Police	Killed trying to stop a terrorist attacking Parliament during the 2017 Westminster attack.	2017
Andreas Oliver Peat	Warrant Officer Class One, Royal Logistic Corps, 33 EOD Regiment	In January 2013 Peat was supporting a patrol of Danish Jaegerkorpset and Afghan National Police. After entering a compound in the Upper Gereshk Valley an IED was triggered, severely injuring a Danish soldier. Peat began to provide medical assistance, but then realized that the injured soldier was lying on another IED, and had to tunnel beneath the injured man to disarm the device. Peat then evacuated the compound which was littered with IEDs rendering safe another IED found under another team of soldiers	2013
Anthony Russell	Sergeant, Royal Marines, 771 Naval Air Squadron	For the rescue of two men from a capsized liferaft, of the yacht Andriette, 7 July 2011.	2013
Ryan Shelley	Marine, Royal Marines	Awarded "in recognition of gallant services in Afghanistan during the period 1 April to 30 September 2010".	2011
Daniel Marc Shepherd †	Captain, Royal Logistic Corps	Ammunition Technical Officer posthumously awarded the GM for clearing 13 IEDs by hand with no protective suit over a 36-hour period. Captain Shepherd was killed in Nad-e-Ali in Helmand Province in southern Afghanistan on 20 July 2009.	2010
Royston Smith	Leader, Southampton City Council	With Alistair Neill, he helped disarm a gunman during the 2011 shooting incident on board HMS Astute.	2011
Richard Stanton and John Volanthen	Civilians; volunteer cave divers	For their role in the Tham Luang cave rescue. Awarded as part of the 2019 New Year Honours, announced on 29 December 2018. Three other members of their team were made MBEs and two were awarded the Queen's Gallantry Medal.	2018
Paul Hassan Zubier	Civilian, Paramedic	"For going to the assistance of a woman being attacked by a man with a knife" during the terrorist attack in Turku, Finland on 18 August 2017. Mr Zubier chased the attacker away and rendered first aid to the victim. The attacker returned twice and Mr Zubier fought him off sustaining further injuries himself while continuing treatment and shielding the victim and others from attack.	2018

== 2020s ==
Name	Rank and Unit	Action/Citation	Year awarded
Grace O'Malley-Kumar †	Civilian	Posthumously, for her bravery in the 2023 Nottingham attacks.	2025
Nathan Newby	Civilian	For intervening in a suspected bombing at St James's University Hospital in Leeds on 20 January 2023.	2025

== See also ==
- List of recipients of the George Medal for other decades
