= General Crawford =

General Crawford may refer to:

- Charles Crawford (United States Army officer) (1866–1945), U.S. Army brigadier general
- Kenneth Crawford (1895–1961), British Army general
- Patrick Crawford (1933–2009), British Army major general
- Robert W. Crawford (1891–1981), U.S. Army major general
- Samuel W. Crawford (1829–1892), Union Army brigadier general and brevet major general

== See also ==
- Attorney General Crawford (disambiguation)
- Charles Craufurd (1763–1821), British Army lieutenant general
- James Craufurd (British Army officer) (1804–1888), British Army lieutenant general
- Robert Craufurd (1764–1812), British Army major general
