= Downing Street mortar attack =

1991 IRA assassination attempt in London

- Part of The Troubles
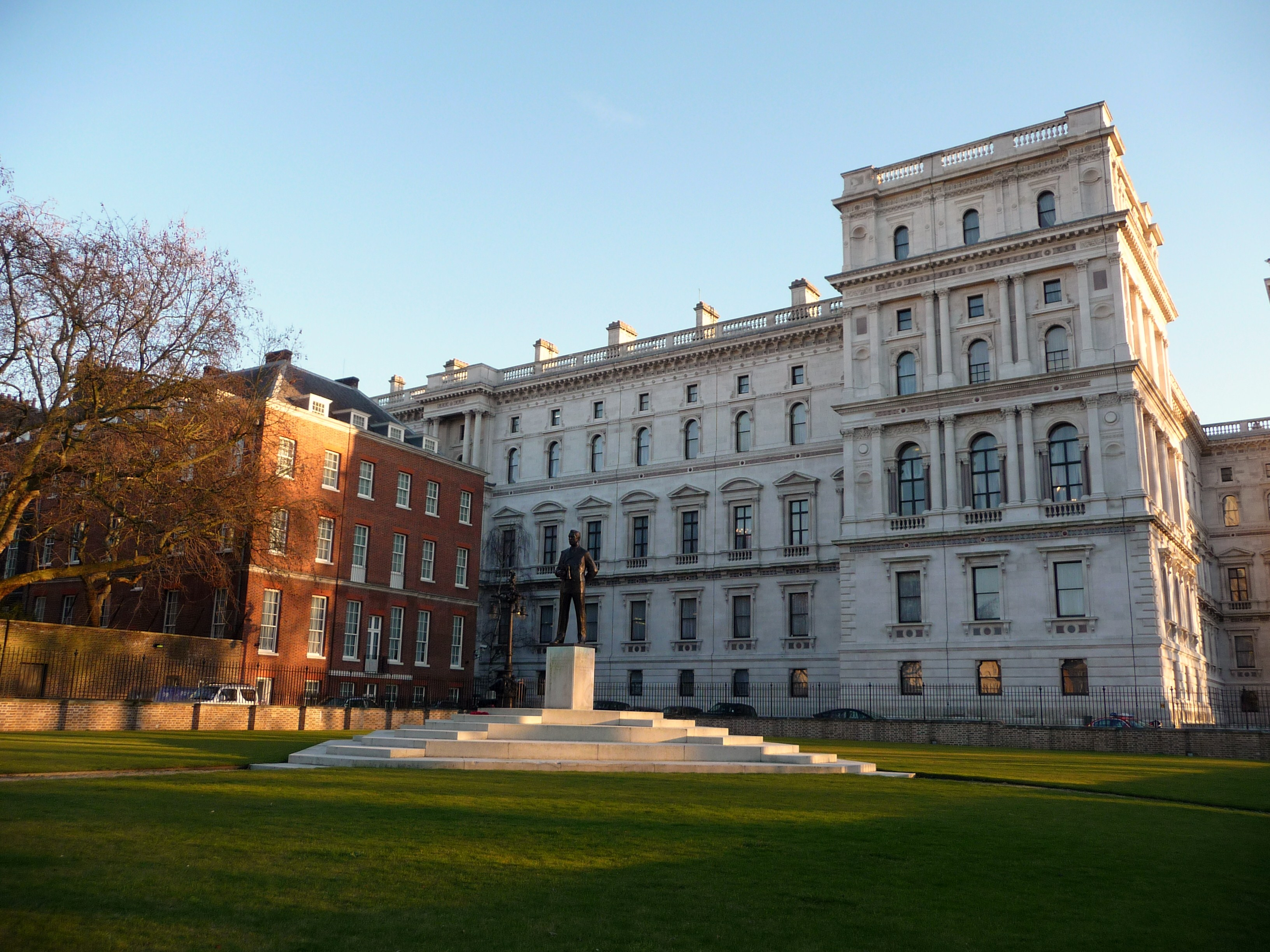
- Mountbatten Green, where two of the shells landed. In the background is the Foreign Office and to the left is the back of 12 Downing Street.
- Location: 51°30′13″N 00°07′41″W; 10 Downing Street, London, England
- Date: 7 February 1991; 10:08 am (GMT)
- Target: John Major
- Attack type: Mortar attack Assassination attempt
- Deaths: 0
- Injuries: 4
- Perpetrator: Provisional IRA

The Provisional Irish Republican Army (IRA) launched three homemade mortar shells at 10 Downing Street, London, the headquarters of the British government, on 7 February 1991. The goal was to assassinate Prime Minister John Major and his war cabinet, who were meeting to discuss the Gulf War.

One of the 140 pound (64 kg) mortar shells exploded in the back garden of Number 10, a few yards from the Cabinet Office. Due to the presence of bomb-resistant windows, none of the cabinet were hurt, though four other people received minor injuries, including two Metropolitan Police officers. The other two shells overshot Downing Street and landed on a green nearby.

== Background ==
During the Troubles, as part of its armed campaign against British rule in Northern Ireland, the Provisional Irish Republican Army (IRA) repeatedly used homemade mortars against targets in Northern Ireland. The most notable occasion was the 1985 Newry mortar attack which killed nine members of the Royal Ulster Constabulary. The IRA carried out many attacks in England, but none involved mortars. In December 1988, items used in mortar construction and technical details regarding the weapon's trajectory were found during a raid in Battersea, South London, by members of the Metropolitan Police Anti-Terrorist Branch. In the late 1980s, Prime Minister Margaret Thatcher was top of the IRA's list for assassination, following the failed attempt on her life in the Brighton hotel bombing.

Security around Downing Street had been stepped up at a cost of £800,000 following increased IRA activity in England in 1988, including the addition of a police guard post and security gates at the end of the street. Plans to leave a car bomb on a street near Downing Street and detonate it by remote control as Thatcher's official car was driving by had been ruled out by the IRA's Army Council owing to the likelihood of civilian casualties, which some Army Council members argued would have been politically counter-productive.

== Preparation ==
The Army Council instead sanctioned a mortar attack on Downing Street and, in mid-1990, two IRA members travelled to London to plan the attack. One was knowledgeable about the trajectory of mortars and the other, from the IRA's Belfast Brigade, was familiar with their manufacture. In July 1990, active service unit members bought a white Ford Transit van for cash and rented a garage. An IRA co-ordinator procured the explosives and materials needed to make the mortars. The unit began making the mortars and cutting a hole in the roof of the van for the mortars to be fired through. The hole would later be patched over with duct tape and painted white to disguise the firing port. They reconnoitred locations in Whitehall to find a suitable place from which the mortars could be fired at the back of 10 Downing Street, the official residence and office of the British prime minister.

Once preparations were complete, the two IRA members returned to Ireland, as the group's leadership considered them valuable personnel and did not wish to risk them being arrested in any follow-up operation by the security services. In November 1990, Thatcher unexpectedly resigned from office, but the Army Council decided the planned attack should still go ahead, targeting her successor John Major. The IRA planned to attack when Major and his ministers were likely to be meeting at Downing Street and waited until the date of a planned cabinet meeting was publicly known.

== The attack ==
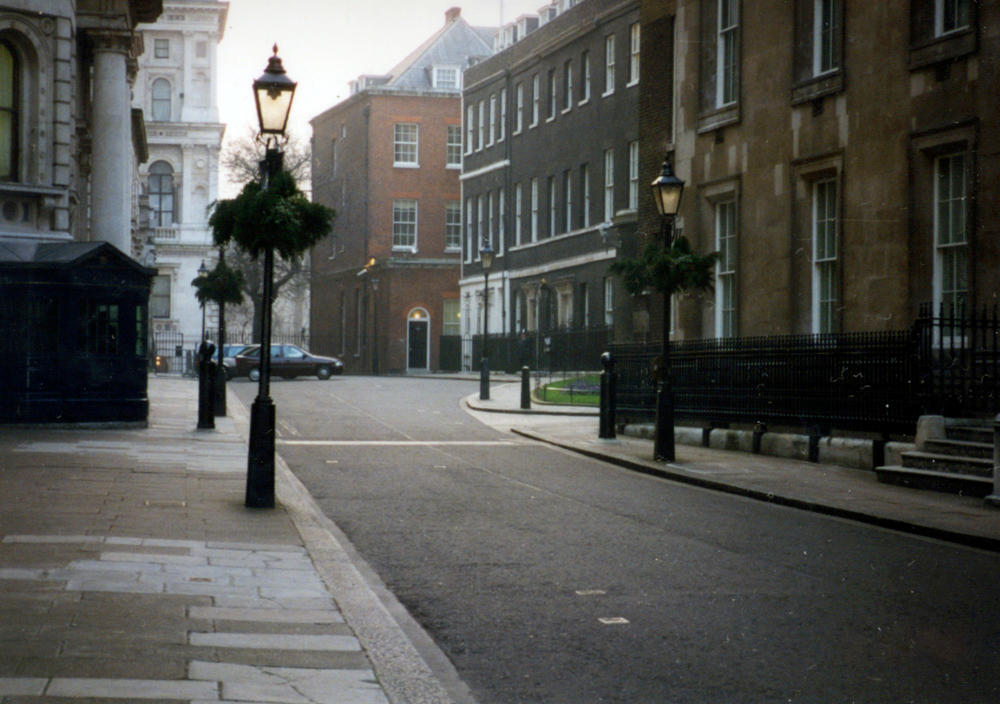
Downing Street in 1996

On the morning of 7 February 1991, Major's war cabinet, along with other senior government and military officials, were meeting at Downing Street to discuss the ongoing Gulf War. As well as Major, those present included politicians Douglas Hurd, Tom King, Norman Lamont, Peter Lilley, Patrick Mayhew, David Mellor and John Wakeham; civil servants Robin Butler, Percy Cradock, Gus O'Donnell and Charles Powell; and Chief of the Defence Staff David Craig. As the meeting began, an IRA member was driving the van to the launch site at the junction of Horse Guards Avenue and Whitehall, about 200 yards (180 m) from Downing Street.

On arrival, the driver parked the van opposite the Duke of Devonshire statue and left the scene on a waiting motorcycle. Several minutes later at 10:08 am, as a policeman was walking towards the van to investigate it, three mortar shells were launched from a Mark 10 homemade mortar, followed by the explosion of a pre-set incendiary device. This device was designed to destroy any forensic evidence and set the van on fire. Each shell was four feet six inches (1.4 m) long, weighed 140 pounds (60 kg), and carried a 40-pound (20 kg) payload of the plastic explosive Semtex.

Two shells landed on Mountbatten Green, a grassed area near the Foreign and Commonwealth Office. One exploded and the other failed to detonate. The third shell exploded in the back garden of 10 Downing Street, 30 yards (27 m) from the Cabinet Office, where the meeting was being held. Had the shell struck 10 Downing Street itself, it is likely the entire cabinet would have been killed. On hearing the explosion, the cabinet ducked under the table for cover. Bomb-proof netting on the windows of the Cabinet Office muffled the force of the explosion, which scorched the back wall of the building, smashed windows and made a crater several feet deep in the garden.

Once the sound of the explosion and aftershock had died down, Major said, "I think we had better start again, somewhere else." The room was evacuated and the meeting reconvened less than ten minutes later in the Cabinet Office Briefing Room. No members of the cabinet were hurt, but four people received minor injuries, including two police officers injured by flying debris. Immediately after the attack, hundreds of police officers sealed off the government district, from the Houses of Parliament to Trafalgar Square. Until 6 pm, civilians were kept out of the area as forensic experts combed the streets and government employees were locked in behind security gates.

== Aftermath ==
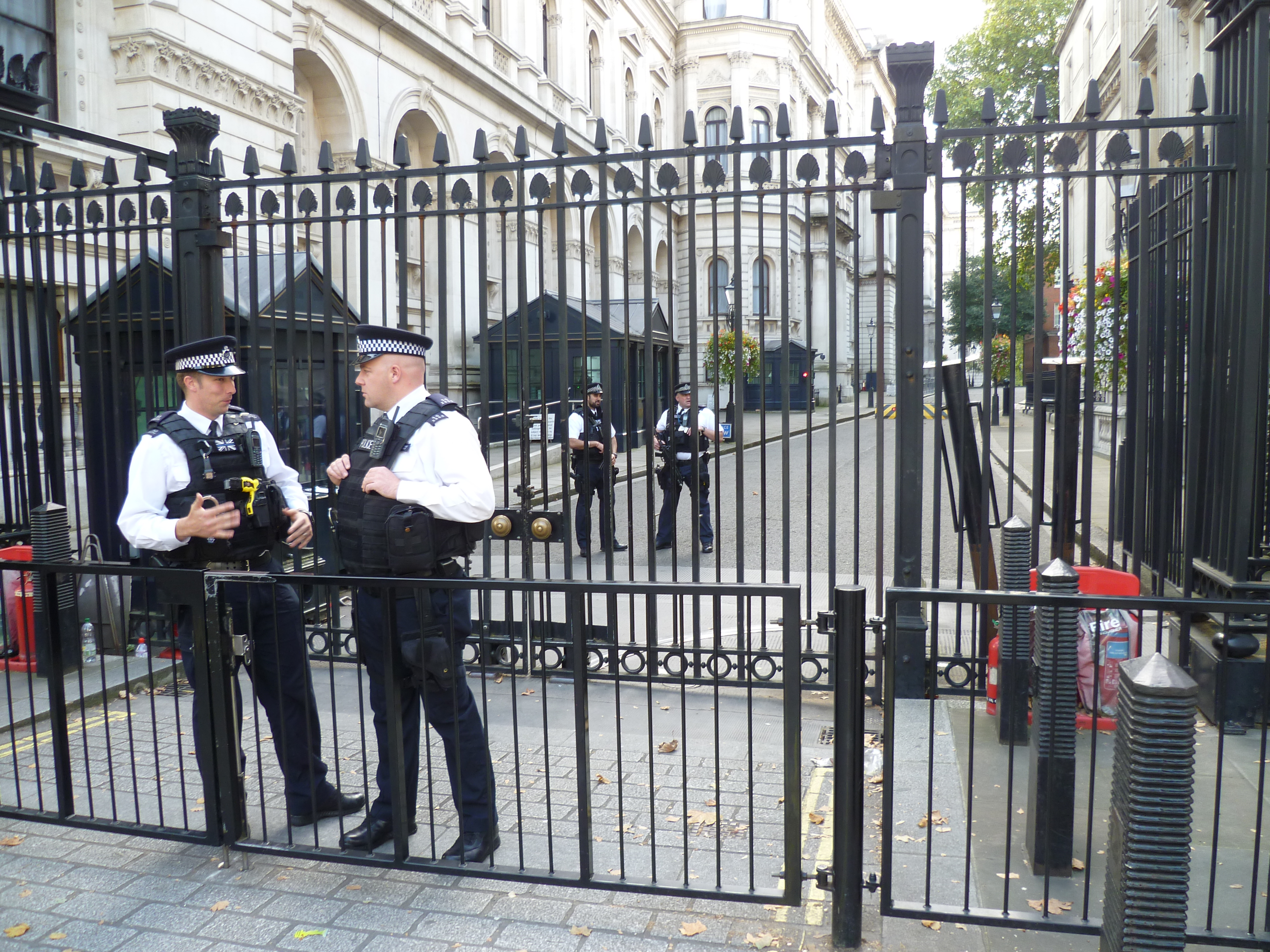
The security gates installed in 1989 as a result of the IRA's bombing campaign in England

The IRA claimed responsibility for the attack with a statement issued in Dublin, saying: "Let the British government understand that, while nationalist people in the six counties [Northern Ireland] are forced to live under British rule, then the British Cabinet will be forced to meet in bunkers". Major told the House of Commons "Our determination to beat terrorism cannot be beaten by terrorism. The IRA's record is one of failure in every respect, and that failure was demonstrated yet again today. It's about time they learned that democracies cannot be intimidated by terrorism, and we treat them with contempt." Leader of the Opposition Neil Kinnock called the attack "vicious and futile". The head of the Metropolitan Police Anti-Terrorist Branch, Commander George Churchill-Coleman, described the attack as "daring, well planned, but badly executed". Several years later, Peter Gurney, the head of the Explosives Section of the Anti-Terrorist Branch, who defused one of the unexploded shells, remarked on the accuracy of the mortars stating "Technically, it was quite brilliant and I'm sure that many army crews, if given a similar task, would be very pleased to drop a bomb that close". Gurney also stated that the angle of firing had been pre-calculated using scale maps and photographs of the local area, adding that strips of masking tape stuck to the inside of the van's windscreen may have been used to line the vehicle up with a predetermined building so as to use it as an aiming point.

A further statement from the IRA appeared in An Phoblacht, with a spokesperson stating, "Like any colonialists, the members of the British establishment do not want the result of their occupation landing at their front or back doorstep ... Are the members of the British cabinet prepared to give their lives to hold on to a colony? They should understand the cost will be great while Britain remains in Ireland." The attack was celebrated in Irish rebel culture when the band The Irish Brigade released a song titled "Downing Street", to the tune of "On the Street Where You Live", which included the lyrics "while you hold Ireland, it's not safe down the street where you live".

Major temporarily moved to Admiralty House while repairs of the bomb damage (mostly to the garden and exterior walls) were being completed. The attack led to the addition of guardhouses at the street ends as well as other less visible measures to further improve security of Downing Street.

== See also ==
- List of terrorist incidents in London
- List of bombings during the Troubles
- Assassination of Spencer Perceval
