= Attorney General Crawford =

Attorney General Crawford may refer to:

- Coe I. Crawford (1858–1944), Attorney General of South Dakota
- George W. Crawford (1798–1872), Attorney General of Georgia

== See also ==
- General Crawford (disambiguation)
