= Nathan Newby =

George Medal awardee

Nathan Newby GM
- Born: 1991–1992
- Known for: Preventing a hospital bomb attack

Nathan Newby, GM (born 1991–1992) prevented a bomb from detonating outside the maternity wing of St James's University Hospital in Leeds, Yorkshire, in 2023. He was awarded the George Medal for his bravery, the UK's second highest award for civilian gallantry, in October 2025.

== Planned hospital bomb attack ==
Nathan Newby was staying as a patient at St James's University Hospital on 20 January 2023. In the evening, he went outside the hospital buildings to have a vape when he came across Mohammad Farooq. Farooq was employed at the hospital as a nursing assistant and was later described in court as a "self‑radicalised lone‑wolf terrorist" inspired by the Islamic State. Farooq also had a grievance against some of his hospital colleagues, and had intended to kill as many nurses as possible, through the detonation of a homemade pressure cooker bomb. He was additionally armed with knives and an imitation gun. Farooq had sent a text message bomb warning to one of his colleagues in the hospital, which he hoped would force the evacuation of the hospital and thereby maximise the number of casualties.

The text message was not immediately noticed by the staff member, and there was no evacuation. Around this time Newby noticed that Farooq was swaying and appeared uncomfortable. Newby engaged in conversation with Farooq, which ultimately lasted some two hours. In the course of this conversation Newby asked Farooq about a bag which Farooq had placed a short distance away. Farooq told Newby there was a bomb inside, and invited him to have a look. Newby continued the conversation but persuaded Farooq that they should both move away from the building, in order to minimise the risk to others. After further discussion, Farooq asked Newby to phone the police "before I change my mind." The police arrived shortly afterwards, Farooq was arrested, and the bomb and weapons were secured. There were no casualties.

== Trial of bomber ==
At Sheffield Crown Court on 21 March 2025, Farooq, having previously been found guilty of preparing acts of terrorism, was sentenced to life imprisonment, with a minimum term of 37 years. In sentencing Farooq, Mrs Justice Cheema-Grubb paid tribute to the actions of Newby describing him as a "modest and gentle man, whose evidence was amongst the most remarkable the court has ever heard." Cheema-Grubb added:"He is an extraordinary, ordinary man whose decency and kindness on January 20, 2023, prevented an atrocity in the maternity wing of a major British hospital."

== Presentation of George Medal ==
On 6 October 2025, St James' Palace announced that Newby had been awarded the George Medal. The citation noted: "Despite the threat to his life, Mr Newby proceeded to engage the suspect for two hours, with the aim of persuading him to abort his plan and hand himself into the police ... His actions in the face of imminent danger over a sustained period likely prevented a potentially catastrophic event at the hospital, and ultimately saved many lives."

Newby went to St James' Palace in London on 25 March 2026, where he received the George Medal from King Charles III.

== See also ==
- List of recipients of the George Medal
