= Reis Leming =

United States Air Force airman

Reis Lee Leming
- Born: 6 November 1930; East St. Louis, Illinois
- Died: 4 November 2012 (aged 81)
- Military career
- Allegiance: United States
- Branch: United States Air Force
- Rank: Airman 2nd class
- Unit: 67th Air Rescue Squadron
- Awards: George Medal; Soldier's Medal

Reis Lee Leming GM (6 November 1930 – 5 November 2012) was an American airman who was awarded the British George Medal for his efforts in rescuing people during the North Sea flood of 1953.

== The rescue ==
On the night of 31 January 1953 the sea defences of Hunstanton, Norfolk, were overwhelmed by a storm surge, with up to 10 feet (3.0 m) of seawater flooding the low-lying South Beach area. Many U.S. service families were quartered there, and Leming's unit, the 67th Air Rescue Squadron, based at nearby RAF Sculthorpe, were mobilised to assist. Leming, a 22-year-old Airman 2nd Class serving as an Aerial Gunner, could not swim, but dressed in a survival suit and dragging an inflatable raft, waded through the flood waters in the darkness and rescued 27 people before collapsing from exhaustion and hypothermia.

Leming returned to the USA the year after the flood. Before that, when he announced his engagement (to Mary Ramsay) the town insisted on hosting the wedding. The ceremony was held in June 1953 and was attended by the mayor and other leading figures of the town whilst a large crowd gathered outside. At a time sugar was still rationed in England local women pooled their rations to bake Leming a huge wedding cake and the town presented him with a set of Doulton china. Since that time Leming returned to the town on several occasions, in 1993 attended the memorial service for the disaster and was presented to the Queen and Queen Mother at Sandringham.

== Awards ==
External videos
- "1953 Norfolk flood hero dies" (6 November 2012). ITV News report covering Leming's actions in 1953 and his death. Includes archive footage from 1953 and interviews with Leming. ITV News Official channel. (Flash Video.)

In March 1953 Leming was awarded the Soldier's Medal by the United States, and on 15 April 1953 was presented with the George Medal. He and Staff Sergeant Freeman A. Kilpatrick, who rescued 18 people that night, were the first Americans to receive the medal in peacetime. Presenting the medal, Sir David Maxwell Fyfe, the Home Secretary, said:

I ask you always to think of this signal honour, which the Queen has conferred upon you, as the outward and visible sign of the gratitude of English men and women for all that you and your colleagues serving under the United States flag did for us when help was desperately needed to save lives from the dreadful forces of wind and water.

The Queen, who did not present the medal personally as she was in mourning for Queen Mary at the time, thanked Leming at Sandringham House in 1993.

On 22 September 1956 Leming was invited to christen the ship Mayflower II, a replica of the Pilgrim ship, that was built at Brixham, Devon. On 13 July 2012 Hunstanton Town Council approved a motion to name the footway through the Esplanade Gardens "Reis Leming Way". As of November 2021, Reis Leming's George Medal and Soldier's Medal are on display at the RAF Sculthorpe Heritage Centre.

== See also ==
- List of recipients of the George Medal
