= Barrack buster =

Class of improvised mortars from Northern Ireland

Mk-15 Barrack Buster
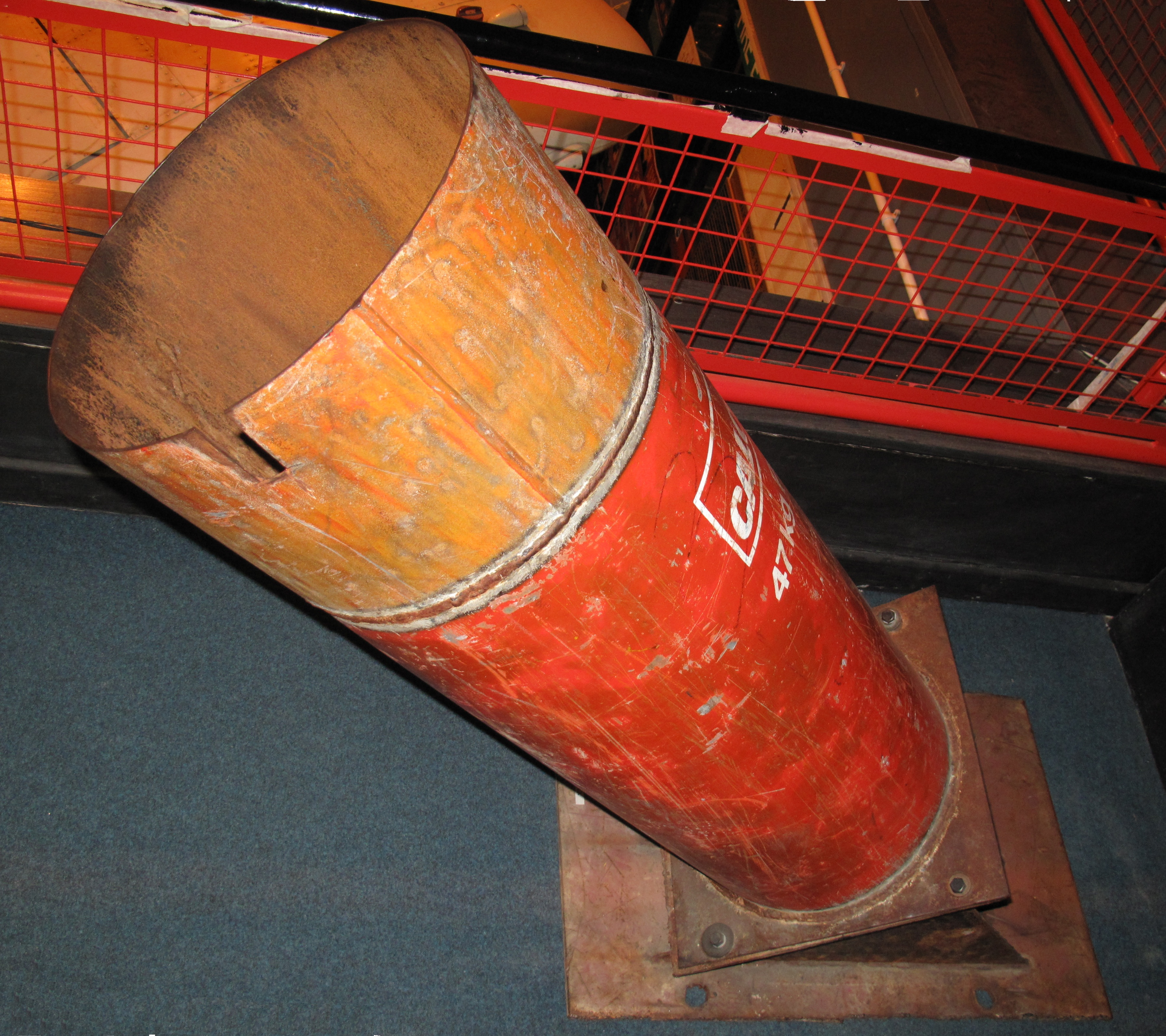
- IRA's Barrack Buster mortar
- Type: Mortar
- Place of origin: Northern Ireland

Service history
- Used by: Provisional IRA
- Wars: The Troubles

Production history
- Designed: 1992
- Manufacturer: Homemade

Specifications
- Shell: HE 196–220 pounds (80–100 kg)
- Caliber: 320mm (12.75in)
- Maximum firing range: 275 yards (250 m)
- Detonation mechanism: Impact

Barrack buster is the colloquial name given to several improvised mortars, developed in the 1990s by the engineering unit of the Provisional Irish Republican Army (IRA).

The improvised mortar properly called "barrack buster" - known to the British security forces as the Mark 15 mortar - fired a 1 metre (3 ft 3 in) long metal propane cylinder with a diameter of 36 centimetres (14 in), which contained around 75 kg (165 lb) of home-made explosives and had a range of 75 to 275 metres (246 to 902 ft). The cylinder is an adaptation of a commercial gas cylinder produced by the Cobh company Kosangas for heating and cooking, and used in rural areas across Ireland.

The Mark 15 was first used in an attack on 7 December 1992 against an RUC/British Army base in Ballygawley, County Tyrone, The projectile, fired from a tractor parked near the town's health center, was deflected by the branches of a tree beside the perimeter fence. A number of civilians had to be evacuated. It took ten hours for the British Army technicians to defuse the device. A later IRA statement acknowledged that the mortar bomb had "failed to detonate properly". The following, more successful attack took place on 20 January 1993 in Clogher, also in County Tyrone, where the local RUC compound was heavily damaged, and several RUC constables wounded.

== Provisional IRA's mortars ==
The barrack buster belongs to a series of home-made mortars developed since the 1970s. The first such mortar—Mark 1—was used in an attack in May 1972 and it was soon followed by the first of a series of improved or differentiated versions stretching into the 1990s:

- Mark 1 (1972): consisted of a 50 mm copper pipe filled with 10 ounces (0.28 kg) of plastic explosives. Propelled by a .303 (7.7 mm) and detonated by a .22 (5.6 mm) cartridge.
- Mark 2 (1972–73): an 8 in (20 cm) length 57 mm steel pipe filled with 2 pounds (0.91 kg) of explosive and detonated by a 12 gauge shotgun cartridge. This weapon resulted in the first fatality due to Provisional IRA mortars when a British soldier was killed trying to defuse a misfired projectile launched on Fort Monagh barracks at Turf Lodge, Belfast, on 10 December 1972.
- Mark 3 (1973–74): a 60 mm mortar barrel with a static firing pin on the plate and a range of 260 yards (240 m). Propelled by a dried mixture of rags and sodium chlorate and detonated by a charge of ammonium nitrate. Used in attacks on Creggan Camp, Derry and Lisanelly Camp, Omagh, in 1973. During an attack on a police station, a mortar misfired and killed two IRA men operating the device.
- Mark 4 (1974): Basically a Mark 3 with a larger charge of propellant which extended its range to 400 yards (370 m). The bomb was filled with 1 pound (0.45 kg) of ammonium nitrate and aluminium powder. Used only in one known attack on a base in Strabane, County Tyrone, on 22 February 1974.
- Mark 5 (1974): Never used in any known attack, the security forces learned of it after the discovery of an IRA workshop at Cushendall, County Antrim, in 1974.
- Mark 6 (1974–1994): A 60 mm conventional mortar with a bipod and base plate and a range of 1,200 yards (1,100 m). The shell was propelled by a charge of homemade gunpowder, ignited by a .22 cartridge. The warhead, made of 3 lb (1.4 kg) of Semtex, was detonated by another .22 cartridge on impact. The bomb armed itself "by means of a wind-driven propeller, which is an integral part of the striker". A Mark 6 grenade was thrown by hand on the roof of an armored vehicle from the top of Divis Flats, Belfast, causing widespread damage and some casualties. It was used in March 1994 in three attacks on London Heathrow Airport in Britain. It is not known to have been used after these actions.
- Mark 7 (1976): Longer version of Mark 6.
- Mark 8 (1976): Longer version of Mark 6, it consisted of a 4-foot (1.2 m) steel tube, but the projectile was aerodynamically unstable. First used against the British Army base at Crossmaglen. Staff Sergeant Bruce was awarded the George Medal for clearing some unexploded ordnance after this incident.
- Mark 9 (1976–?): The device fired a shorter but wider mortar bomb, made of a cut-down gas cylinder. First used against Crossmaglen Army base on 23 October 1976.
- Mark 10 (1979–1994): A large-calibre mortar firing a projectile containing 44–220 pounds (20–100 kg) of explosives. Its first use on 19 March 1979 caused the first deliberate victim—a British soldier—from an IRA mortar attack in Newtownhamilton, South Armagh. It was primarily designed to attack police stations and military bases, and was used in the 1985 Newry mortar attack which killed nine police officers. It was used in several attacks using configurations with multiple launching tubes, "often launched from the back of Transit type vans". Three such mortars using a mixture of ammonium nitrate and nitrobenzene—known as "Annie"—as warhead were used on 7 February 1991 in an IRA attack on 10 Downing Street in London against British Prime Minister John Major and his War Cabinet during the first Gulf War. It was superseded by the larger Mark 15.
- Mark 11 (1989–?) : Used for the first time on 13 May 1989 against a British Army observation post in Glassdrumman, South Armagh. The mortar had a range of 550 yards (500 m).
- Improvised Projected Grenade (IPG) (1985–?): A shoulder-fired weapon used against armoured vehicles as well as RUC/Army bases. Launched a warhead made of 40 ounces (1.1 kg) of Semtex and TNT. After an IRA volunteer was killed in March 1986 additional safety features were incorporated, but firing still left a distinct bruise on operator's shoulder. Superseded by Projected Recoilless Improvised Grenade (PRIG) in 1991.
- Mark 12 (1985–?): Remotely-activated mortar fired horizontally against armoured vehicles. First used in March 1991 against a mobile patrol of the Ulster Defence Regiment (UDR), destroying an armoured Land Rover vehicle and killing two soldiers in an ambush at Mullacreevie, Armagh City. (See:Anti-tank_mine#Off-route_mines)
- Mark 13 (1990–?): A spigot mortar, usually fired from the back of a heavy vehicle. Used for first and only time in a botched attack on a security forces base in Dungannon, County Tyrone, in May 1990.
- Mark 14 (1992–?): Made of two halves of 25 pounds (11 kg) gas cylinders welded together and capable of carrying a payload of 50 pounds (23 kg) of high explosive. First used on 31 May 1992 in an attack on Crossmaglen security base.
- Mark 15 (1992–?): First mortar known as "barrack buster". It was the "standard IRA large calibre [mortar] system" and described as having "the effect of a 'flying car bomb'". It has a calibre of 320 mm and fires a bomb of 196–220 pounds (89–100 kg) of explosives, with a maximum range of 275 yards (251 m). It has also been used in configurations with multiple launch tubes, with an attack using 12 tubes against a British military base in Kilkeel, County Down, on 9 October 1993 as being the "record". The attack on Clogher RUC security base involved a 300 pounds (140 kg) device flying over a 4.5 metres (15 ft) wall. Two British helicopters, an Army Lynx that was hovering over the helipad at a base under attack, and an RAF Puma taking off from another base, were brought down by this type of mortar between March and July 1994 in South Armagh. Author Toby Harnden describes the 1994 shooting down of the Lynx as the most successful attack on a helicopter by the IRA during the Troubles. The barrel was usually attached to a hydraulic hoist towed by a tractor to the launching site.
- Mark 16 (1991–?): A shoulder-fired weapon for use against armoured vehicles. First used in May 1991. Also described as Projected Recoilless Improvised Grenade (PRIG). The projectile was a 1-pound (0.45 kg) tin can filled with 600 grammes of Semtex formed into a shaped charge.
- Mark 17 (1994–?): Irish intelligence sources believed a new, even more powerful mortar dubbed the "Mark 17" was tested during the 1994-1996 ceasefire in the Carlingford Lough area of County Louth, just south of the border.

=== Strategic impact ===
The intensification of the IRA's mortar campaign in the late 1980s led the British government to increase the number of army troops in Northern Ireland from its lowest ebb of 9,000 in 1985 to 10,500 in 1992. Also in the 1980s, defense authorities undertook a huge and costly plan to fortify its security facilities across the region to tackle the threat. The IRA's use of mortars combined with heavy machine guns compelled the British Army to build their main checkpoints more than a mile away from the Irish border by 1992.

These mortars were also used against targets in England, such as the Downing Street attack on 7 February 1991, and the Heathrow mortar attacks in March 1994. Both attacks were intended by the IRA to put pressure on the British Government to negotiate with them.

== Use by other groups ==
In 1972 the Official IRA developed a type of mortar which was used in attacks against several British Army installations on 5 December that year. Provisional IRA-type mortars have been used by the Real IRA, who also developed their own fuzing system, in the 2000s. In early 2000 a new type of mortar was tested by the Real IRA in County Fermanagh. The weapon was classified as a "Mark-19" by the British Army. Furthermore, what appears to be a similar or identical mortar technology known in Colombia as "cilindros" (or "cylinders" in English) have been used since 1998 by the Revolutionary Armed Forces of Colombia (FARC). ETA in Spain was in 2001 rumoured to have built mortars "very similar" to the IRA's. The possible transfer of this mortar technology to the FARC was a central issue in the arrest in August 2001 and later trial of the so-called Colombia Three group of IRA members, who were found innocent of false claims by Colombian authorities and the United States House Committee on Foreign Affairs that they “allegedly” trained FARC in the manufacture and use of this mortar technology even though there was no evidence presented at trial to prove the claim.

== In popular culture ==
A derived term in Belfast refers to a two or three-litre bottle of inexpensive white cider.

== See also ==
- 1985 Newry mortar attack
- 1994 British Army Lynx shootdown
- Davidka - improvised Israeli mortar
- Downing Street mortar attack
- Improvised artillery in the Syrian civil war
- Explosively formed penetrator
- Improvised explosive device
- Improvised tactical vehicles of the Provisional IRA
- List of weapons used by the Provisional Irish Republican Army
