= Peter Gurney (bomb disposal expert) =

British bomb disposal expert (1931–2025)

Peter Edwin Spencer Gurney (12 December 1931–19 September 2025) was a British bomb disposal expert. He headed the London Metropolitan Police's Explosives Office towards the end of his career, and was appointed MBE for gallantry, and was also awarded the George Medal twice.

Gurney was born in Greenwich, London in 1931. He joined the British Army in 1950 and served in many countries including Germany and Libya. In 1973, Gurney left the army and joined the Metropolitan Police's Explosives Office in London. In 1985 he became head of the Explosives Office. He most notably disarmed one of the unexploded shells that was fired at 10 Downing Street during the Downing Street mortar attack. He retired in 1991 but continued to provide his expertise as a consultant on terrorists using explosives and also by training foreign police forces. In 1993, he published an autobiography, Braver Men Walk Away.
