= Eric Smith (British Army officer) =

British Army officer and military historian (1923–1998)

Eric (E D) Smith
- Born: Eric David Smith; 19 August 1923; Cupar, Fife, Scotland
- Died: 7 March 1998 (aged 74)
- Military career
- Allegiance: United Kingdom
- Branch: British Army
- Service years: 1942–1978
- Rank: Brigadier
- Nickname: Birdie
- Conflicts: Second World War; Malayan Emergency; Malaysia-Indonesia Confrontation
- Awards: MBE, CBE; DSO

Brigadier Eric David "Birdie" Smith CBE DSO (19 August 1923 – 7 March 1998) was a senior British Army officer and military historian who was awarded the Distinguished Service Order, for leadership and gallantry on 3 September 1944, whilst serving with the 2nd Battalion, the 7th Gurkha Rifles in Italy, during the Second World War. Smith later commanded the 1st/2nd Gurkhas in the Borneo Confrontation, Hong Kong and Brunei. He was appointed a Commander of the Order of the British Empire (CBE) in 1975.

== Early life ==
Birdie Smith, was born in Cupar, Fife, Scotland in August 1923. He was nicknamed Birdie because his nose was considered to resemble a bird's beak. He was educated at Allhallows College, Dorset. He joined the Indian Army in 1941 and following attendance at the Officer Training Unit at Bangalore was commissioned and posted to the 7th Gurkha Rifles in 1942. He served with the 2nd/7th Gurkhas in India and Palestine from 1942 to 1944.

== Military career ==
He joined the 4th Indian Division in Italy and fought at Castle Hill during the Battle of Monte Cassino. Later in the Italian campaign, at midnight on 3 September 1944, Smith led C Company, 2nd Battalion, the 7th Gurkha Rifles in the attack on Tavoleto, on the Gothic Line, which was heavily defended. The Gurkhas' attack was met by heavy enemy machine gun fire and later a heavy mortar barrage. Smith although wounded in the leg, killed all the occupants of the first Spandau post encountered with grenades and machine-gun fire; he continued to lead his company which during the fierce fighting was reduced from approximately 100 men to 28 and successfully cleared the village. He was awarded the DSO for his leadership and gallantry. The 7th Gurkha Rifles was awarded the battle honour 'Tavoleto' for this action which is held today by its successor regiment The Royal Gurkha Rifles.

He later served in Greece from November 1944 to 1946 and in India from 1946 to 1947. He served as a Gurkha recruiting officer in Darjeeling, India, from 1948 to 1950. He served as an intelligence officer and company commander with 2nd/7th Gurkhas in the Malayan Emergency and Hong Kong from 1950 to 1955. He attended the Staff College, Camberley in 1956 and on graduation served as a staff officer in the British Army of the Rhine and then with HQ 63 Gurkha Brigade as Deputy Assistant Adjutant & Quartermaster General (DAA&QMG) in Malaya and UK.

In 1962 Smith was posted to Malaya as Second-in-Command of 1/7th Gurkhas and deployed with the Battalion to Borneo. On 20 April 1964 he was involved in a helicopter crash in the Borneo jungle. The Journey made on a Wessex helicopter commenced at Sibu, Sarawak, and the destination was a forward company base operating north of the Indonesian border. Following the crash, to free him from the wreckage, his right arm was amputated by the battalion's medical officer Captain, later Major-General Patrick Crawford using an Army clasp knife. During the amputation he was fully conscious. He was later taken by another helicopter to Kuching for further surgery. After rehabilitation in UK, he returned to operations in Borneo 18 months after losing his arm in the helicopter crash, taking command of the 1st/2nd Gurkhas. He remained in command of the 1st/2nd Gurkhas following their move to Hong Kong and then as the first resident battalion at Seria, Brunei.

His final posts were commanding the Brigade of Gurkhas in Nepal and as a Vice President of the Army's Regular Commissions Board.

He retired from the British Army on 1 June 1978.

== Honours and later life ==
Smith was Colonel of the 7th Gurkhas from 1975 to 1982. He was appointed MBE in 1952 and CBE in 1975.

Smith died on 7 March 1998. He was survived by his wife Jill and daughters Joanna and Beverly.

== Works ==
Smith was the author of several books, including:

- Even the Brave Falter. Robert Hale. 1978. ISBN 0709168195.
- East of Katmandu The Story of the 7th Duke of Edinburgh's Own Gurkha Rifles. 1976. ISBN 9780850522112.
- Britain's Brigade of Gurkhas. Leo Cooper (Famous regiments). 1983. ISBN 9780436475108.
- Counter-Insurgency Operations. 1, Malaya and Borneo. London: Ian Allan. 1985. ISBN 9780711014626.
- VALOUR - A History of the Gurkhas. Spellmount Staplehurst. 1997. ISBN 1873376588.
