= 67th Special Operations Squadron =

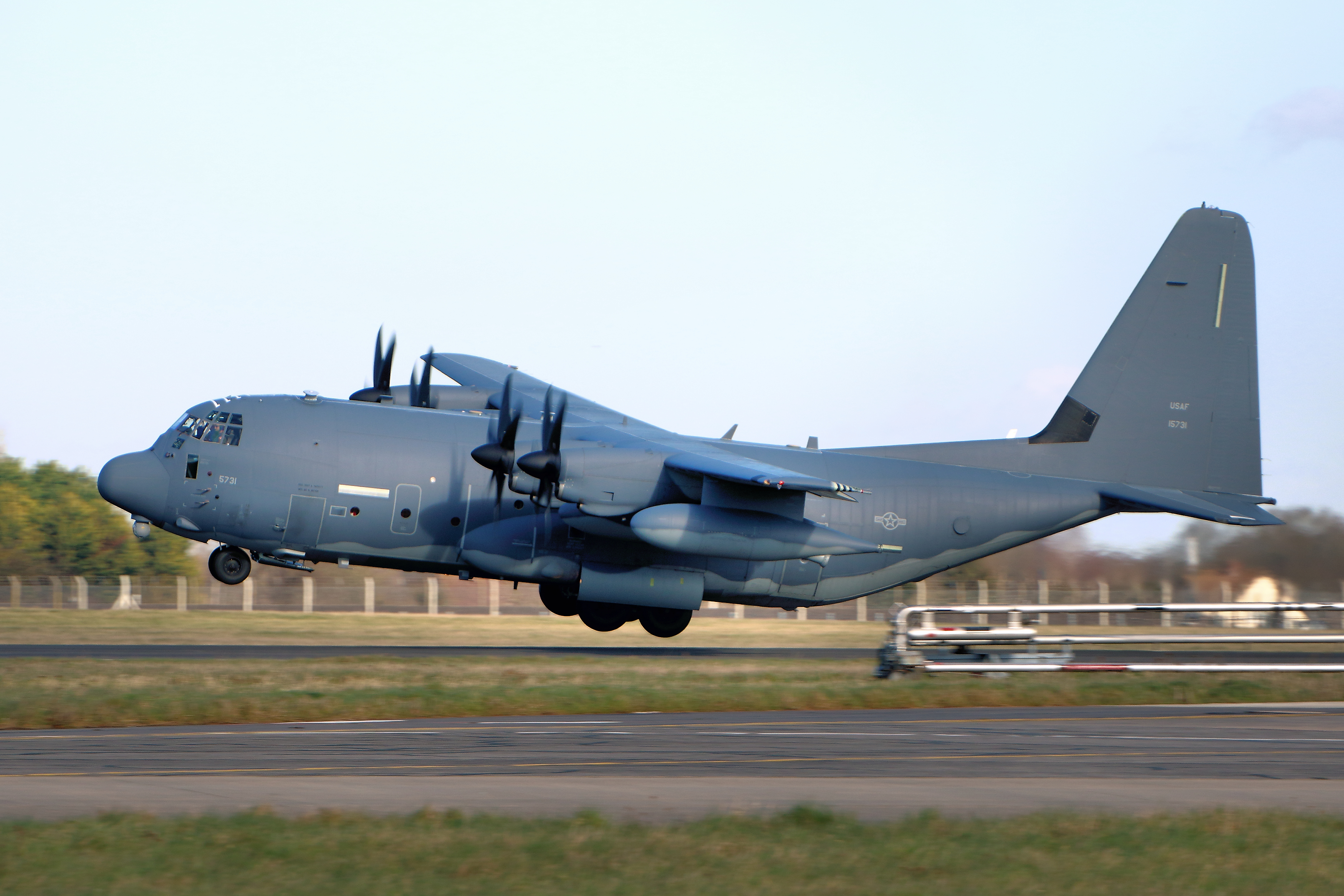
- 67th SOS MC-130J Commando II at RAF Mildenhall.
- Active: 14 Nov 1952 – 18 Mar 1960; 10 May 1961 – present
- Country: United States
- Branch: United States Air Force
- Role: Special Operations
- Part of: Air Force Special Operations Command
- Garrison/HQ: RAF Mildenhall
- Nickname: Night Owls (1994–present)
- Equipment: MC-130J Commando II; C-146A Wolfhound
- Engagements: Desert Storm; Kosovo War
- Decorations: Air Force Outstanding Unit Award with Combat "V" Device; Air Force Gallant Unit Citation; Air Force Outstanding Unit Award; Navy Meritorious Unit Commendation

Insignia
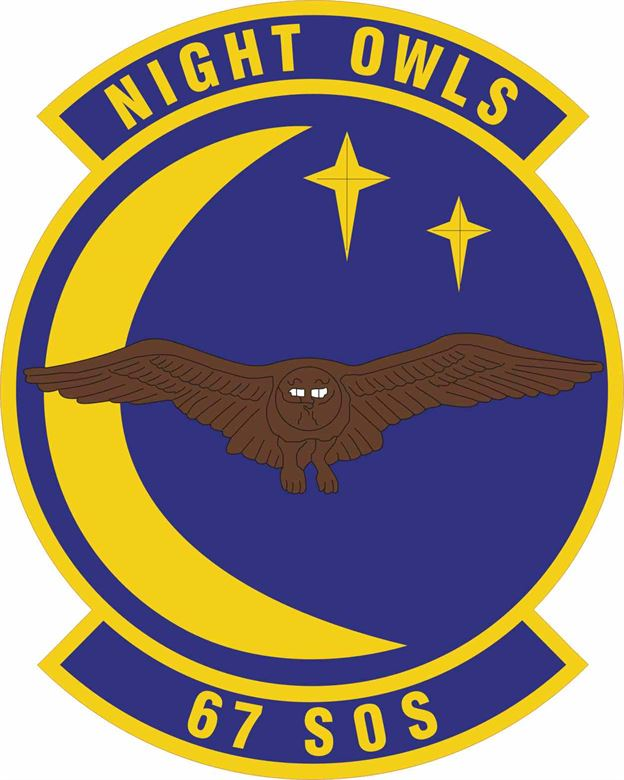
- 67th Special Operations Squadron emblem (approved 8 May 2007)

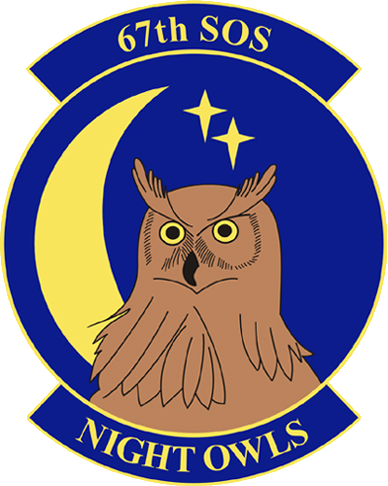
- 67th Special Operations Squadron emblem (approved 16 June 1994)

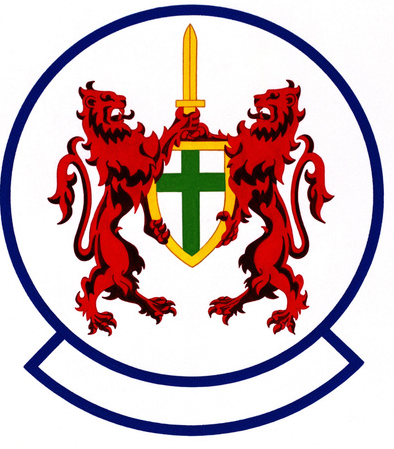
- 67th Aerospace Rescue & Recovery Squadron emblem (approved 15 August 1985)

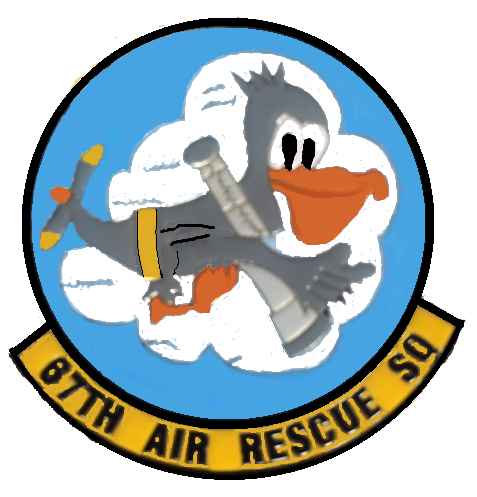
- 67th Air Rescue Squadron emblem

The 67th Special Operation Squadron (67th SOS), nicknamed the Night Owls, is an active United States Air Force unit operating the Lockheed MC-130J Commando II and Fairchild Dornier C-146A Wolfhound. It is based at RAF Mildenhall, Suffolk, in the United Kingdom and assigned to the 752d Special Operations Group. It was originally activated at RAF Sculthorpe in 1952, transferred to Morón Air Base in Spain in 1966, relocated to RAF Woodbridge, Suffolk, in 1970, transferred to RAF Alconbury, Cambridgeshire in 1992 and, finally, moved to RAF Mildenhall in 1995. The 67th SOS is tasked with flying single or multi-ship low-level air refueling missions for special operations helicopters, infiltration, exfiltration and resupply of special operations forces by airdrop or airland.

== History ==
=== 1952–1994 ===
The unit was constituted as the 67th Air Rescue Squadron (67th ARS) on 17 October 1952. It was activated on 14 November 1952 at RAF Sculthorpe, England and discontinued, followed by inactivation, on 18 March 1960 at Prestwick Airport, Scotland. It was activated again on 10 May 1961 and organized on 18 June 1961 at Prestwick Airport, Scotland. The unit was redesignated 67th Air Recovery Squadron (67th ARS) on 1 August 1965, and then as the 67th Aerospace Rescue and Recovery Squadron (67th ARRS) on 8 January 1966.

It was transferred to Morón Air Base, Spain on 1 July 1966. On 15 January 1970, the 67th ARRS transferred to RAF Woodbridge, Suffolk, England. The unit operated the Lockheed HC-130N/P fixed wing (also used as rotational support for their detachment of HH-3E Jolly Green Giant helicopters stationed at NAS Keflavik, Iceland) and Sikorsky MH-53 rotary wing aircraft.

On 1 June 1988, the unit was split into two units redesignated the 67th Special Operations Squadron (67th SOS) for the HC-130 aircraft and the 21st Special Operations Squadron for the HH-53 rotary wing. On 1 April 1992, they moved to RAF Alconbury, Cambridgeshire, UK.

=== RAF Mildenhall (1995–present) ===
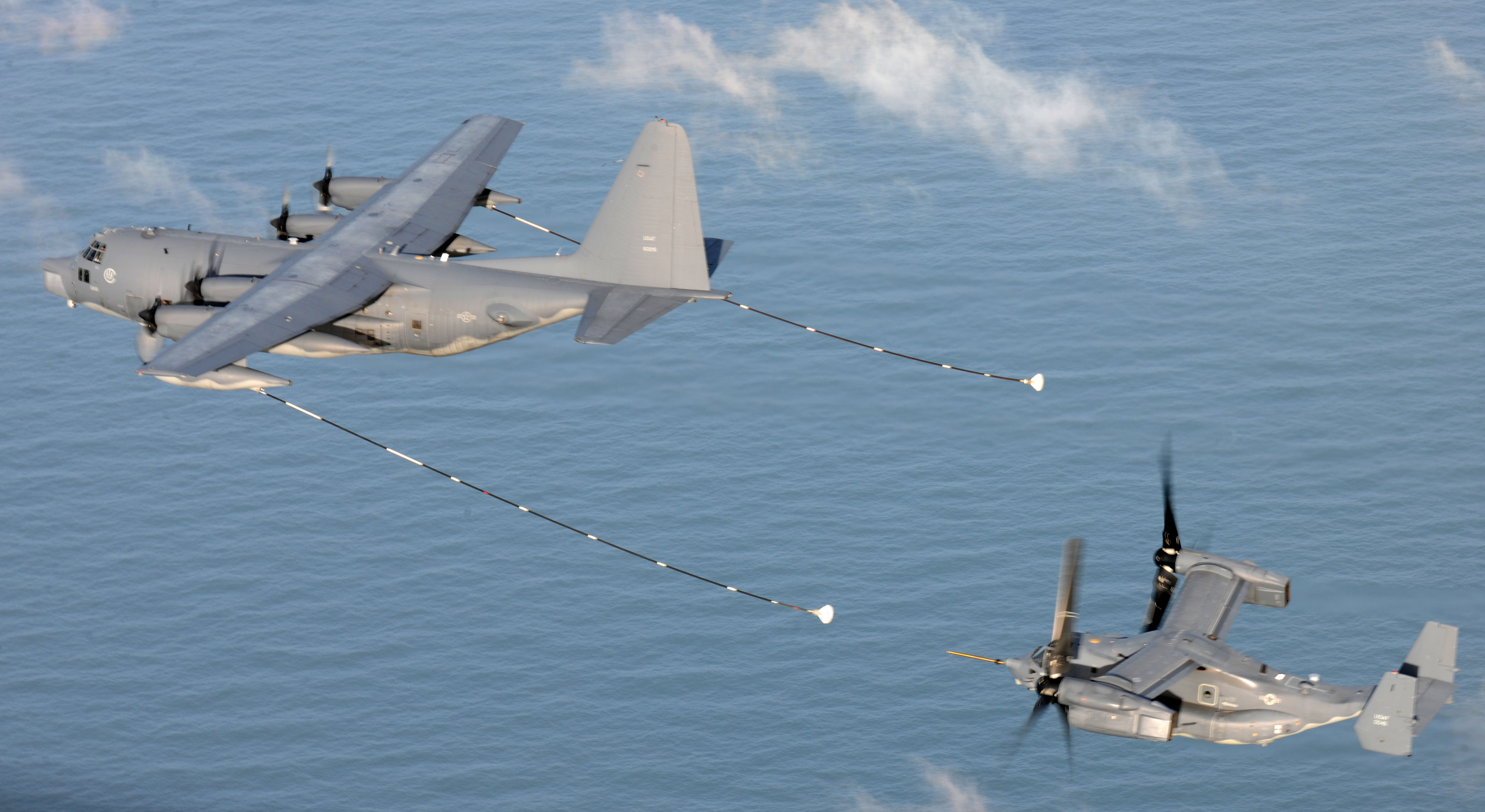
Lockheed MC-130P 66-0215 of the 67th SOS refuels a Bell Boeing CV-22B Osprey of the 7th Special Operations Squadron, 24 January 2014.

On 7 May 1993, it was announced that the 352nd Special Operations Group, including the 67th SOS, would relocate to RAF Mildenhall in Suffolk. However, this move was not completed until 30 April 1995, with the 67th SOS arriving on 17 February 1995.

In February 1996, the squadron's HC-130N/Ps were redesignated the MC-130P Combat Shadow by Air Force Special Operations Command (AFSOC).

On 7 June 2013, the Night Owls began to replace their MC-130P Combat Shadows when their first Lockheed MC-130J Commando II (10-5714) arrived. The last MC-130P sortie was flown on 24 January 2014, which saw a tour of the country over locations including Prestwick, Alconbury and the Dumfries. The squadron completed the transition from the MC-130P to the MC-130J on 3 February 2014, when 66-0215 departed for Hurlburt Field, Florida.

On 8 January 2015, the United States Department of Defense announced that RAF Mildenhall would be closing, with the 67th SOS relocating to Spangdahlem Air Base in Germany. After a prolonged assessment on the future of Mildenhall, the Department of Defense revealed on 29 July 2020 that the decision on Mildenhall would be reversed, while Spangdahlem Air Base would lose its flying mission with the relocation of the 480th Fighter Squadron to Aviano Air Base, Italy.

On 31 October 2020, the Night Owls participated in the successful rescue of 27 year-old hostage Philip Warton in Nigeria.

In August 2024, the 67th SOS participated in Exercise Pristine Flank 24, organised by the Finnish Air Force, in which the squadron was tasked with refuelling Finnish McDonnell Douglas F/A-18C Hornets.

In March 2024, the decision was made by AFSOC to base the Fairchild Dornier C-146A Wolfhound at RAF Mildenhall. The first C-146A (10-3077) was delivered to RAF Mildenhall on 4 December 2024 and was assigned to the 67th SOS.

== Lineage ==
- Constituted as the 67th Air Rescue Squadron on 17 October 1952

Activated on 14 November 1952
Discontinued and inactivated on 18 March 1960

- Activated on 10 May 1961 (not active)

Organized on 18 June 1961
Redesignated 67th Air Recovery Squadron on 1 August 1965
Redesignated 67th Aerospace Rescue and Recovery Squadron on 8 January 1966
Redesignated 67th Special Operations Squadron on 1 June 1988

=== Assignments ===
- 9th Air Rescue Group, 14 Nov 1952 (attached to Third Air Force after 15 November 1953)
- Air Rescue Service, 24 Jun 1958–18 March 1960
- Military Air Transport Service, 10 May 1961 (not organized)
- Air Rescue Service (later Aerospace Rescue and Recovery Service), 18 June 1961
- Atlantic Aerospace Rescue and Recovery Center (later, 40th Aerospace Rescue and Recovery Wing), 8 April 1967
- 39th Aerospace Rescue and Recovery Wing (later 39th Special Operations Wing), 17 May 1973 (under operational control of the Joint Chiefs of Staff, 12–27 June 1976, attached to Joint Special Operations Task Force: 13 January–18 March 1991, 6 April–10 June 1991)
- 352d Special Operations Group, 1 December 1992 (attached to Joint Special Operations Task Force, 2 March–12 July 1993)
- 752d Special Operations Group,

=== Stations ===
- RAF Sculthorpe, England, 14 November 1952
- Prestwick Airport, Scotland, 7 November 1953 – 18 March 1960
- Prestwick Airport, Scotland, 18 June 1961
- Moron Air Base, Spain, 1 July 1966
- RAF Woodbridge, England, 15 January 1970 (deployed at RAF Akrotiri, Cyprus, 13–27 June 1976; Incirlik Air Base, Turkey, 13 January–18 March 1991 and 6 April–10 June 1991)
- RAF Alconbury, England, 1 April 1992 (deployed at Brindisi Air Base, Italy and Incirlik Air Base, Turkey, 2 March–12 July 1993)
- RAF Mildenhall, England, 17 February 1995 – present

=== Aircraft ===
Aircraft operated include:

- Boeing SB-29 Superfortress (1952–1956)
- Fairchild C-82 Packet (1952–1953)
- Douglas C-47 Skytrain (1953–1955)
- Douglas SC-54 Skymaster (later HC-54) (1955–1958; 1962–1965)
- Sikorsky SH-19 (later HH-19) (1955–1960; 1962–1964)
- Grumman SA-16 Albatross (later HU-16) (1957–1960; 1962–1963)
- Douglas C-54 Skymaster (1962–1965)
- Lockheed HC-130H (1965–1969)
- Kaman HH-43 Huskie (1966–1969; 1970; 1971–1972)
- Lockheed HC-130P Combat King (1969–1996)
- Sikorsky HH-3E Jolly Green Giant (1969–1971)
- Lockheed HC-130N Combat King (1970–1996)
- Sikorsky HH-53 Super Jolly Green Giant (1971–1988)
- Lockheed MC-130P Combat Shadow (1996–2014)
- Lockheed MC-130J Commando II (2013–present)
- Fairchild Dornier C-146A Wolfhound (2024–present)

== See also ==
- Reis Leming
