= List of recipients of the George Medal =

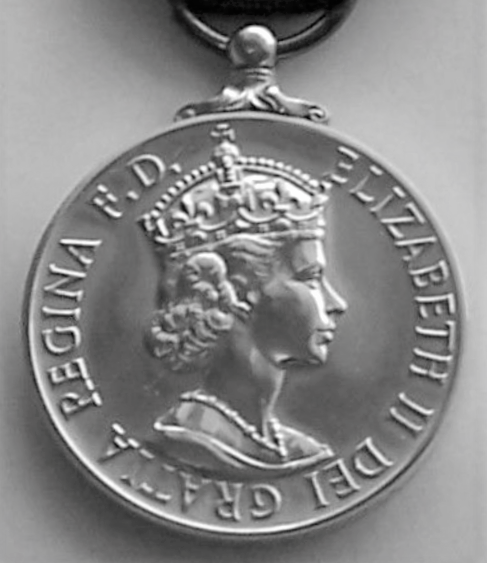
Elizabeth II, late 1950s to date. Inscribed: "ELIZABETH II DEI GRATIA REGINA F.D."

The George Medal is awarded by the United Kingdom and Commonwealth of Nations for acts of great bravery; over 2,000 medals have been awarded since its inception in September 1940. Below are set out lists of recipients of the award. A person's presence in these lists does not suggest their award was more notable than any other award of the George Medal.

- List of recipients of the George Medal, 1940s
- List of recipients of the George Medal, 1950s
- List of recipients of the George Medal, 1960s–1980s
- List of recipients of the George Medal, 1990s–2020s
