= Patrick Crawford =

Major-General Patrick Crawford OStJ GM FRSM
- Born: 11 October 1933; London
- Died: 21 February 2009 (aged 75); Holy Cross Hospital Haslemere
- Military career
- Allegiance: United Kingdom
- Branch: British Army → Royal Army Medical Corps
- Service years: 1960-1993
- Rank: Major-General
- Unit: 7th Gurkha Rifles
- Conflicts: Indonesian Confrontation
- Awards: George Medal

Major-General Ian Patrick Crawford OStJ GM FRSM (11 October 1933 – 21 February 2009) was a British Army medical officer and expert on preventive medicine who was awarded the George Medal for saving the life of a Gurkha officer following a helicopter crash in the Borneo Jungle during the Malaysia-Indonesia confrontation in April 1964.

== Early life ==
Crawford was born in London, the son of Donald and Florence Crawford. He was educated at Chatham House Grammar School and St Thomas' Hospital, where he qualified as MRCS and as LRCP.

== Military career ==
He was a house-surgeon, casualty and orthopaedic surgeon at the Royal Sussex County Hospital in 1959-1960 until he began National Service with the Royal Army Medical Corps. He extended his National Service into a regular commission, before seeing service in Malaysia and Borneo. He then began to focus on preventive medicine and Malaria. From 1968 to 1972 he was on the staff of the British Military hospital, Singapore, was an instructor at the RAMC training centre and a deputy assistant director of Army health in the Ministry of Defence. In 1972, he was offered an exchange assignment with the Australian Army, where he had a visiting lectureship at Queensland University in Brisbane. He returned to England in 1978 where he worked in the Army Medical Directorate before going to Germany as director of army health at 1st British Corps, where he served with many NATO medical officers. During this period he conducted studies into the effects of sleep deprivation, extremes of cold and heat and improving army uniforms. In 1981 he served as the Parkes Professor of Preventive Medicine at the Royal Army Medical College and he served in the Defence Medical Services directorate from 1984 to 1986, after which he was seconded to the Saudi Arabian National Guard from 1986. From 1989 to 1993, he served as Commandant of the Royal Army Medical College.

He retired from the Army in 1993.

== Later life ==
After his Army career, he wrote on preventive medicine and was a member of many charities including the Shipwrecked Fishermen and Mariner's Royal Benevolent Fund and was a trustee of the Florence Nightingale Museum. He hosted former President Jimmy Carter in 1991 at the centenary celebration of the London School of Hygiene and Tropical diseases. He also became a chairman of the Cocking Parish Council. In January 2003, he suffered a cerebral haemorrhage and was confined at Holy Cross Hospital, Haslemere for the last five years of his life. He was survived by his wife, Juliet James, whom he married in 1956 and had two sons and a daughter.

== Honours and decorations ==
He was made a Queen's Honorary Physician in 1991 and a Member of the Order of St. John in 1992.

=== George Medal ===
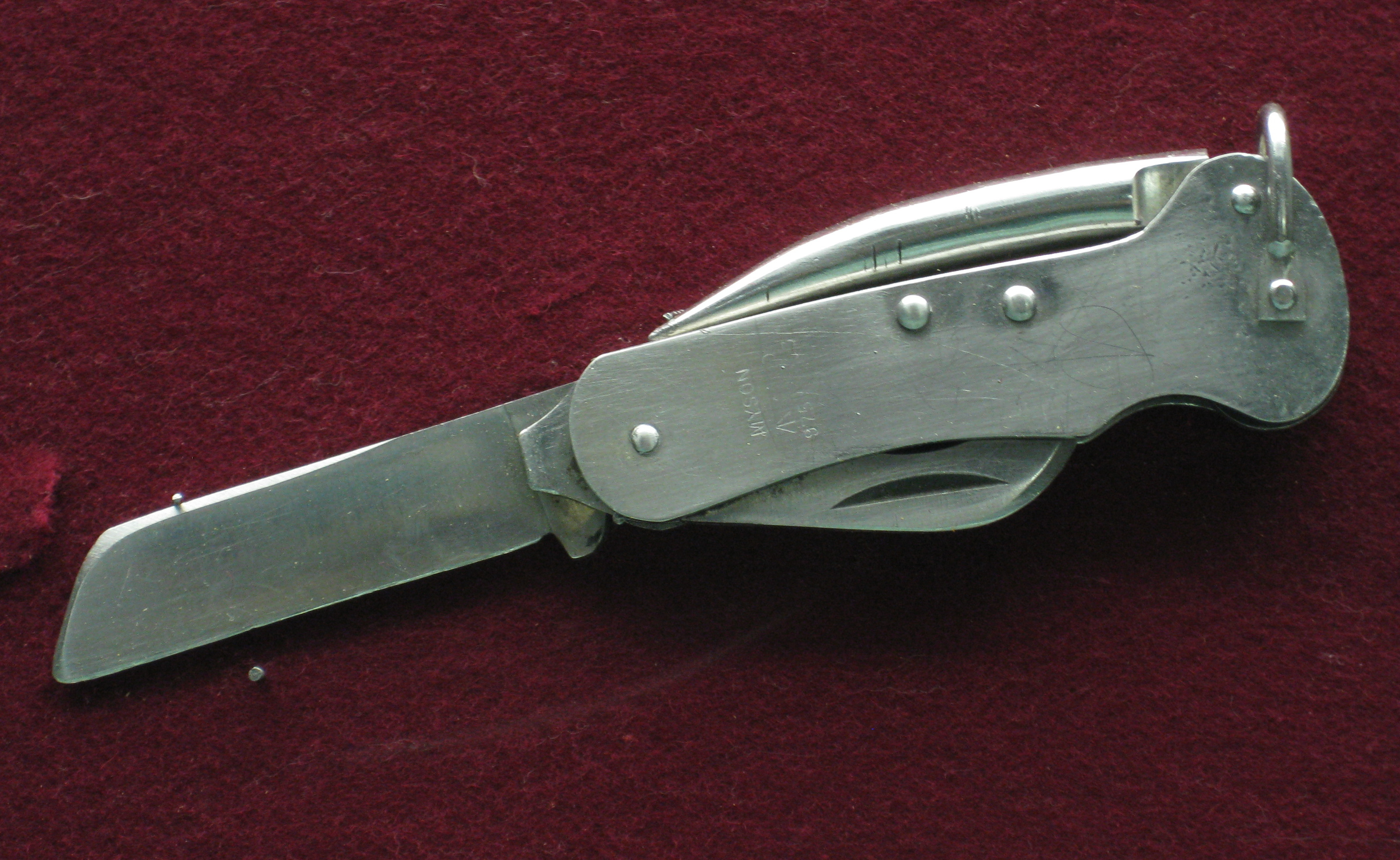
Knife used by Captain Patrick Crawford to amputate the arm of Major Eric 'Birdie' Smith

.

On 20 April 1964, while serving as a captain, he was attached to the 1/7 Gurkha Regiment as the Regimental Medical Officer in Sarawak when the helicopter he was travelling in suffered engine failure, crushing the arm of Major Eric Smith (Army officer), always known as "Birdie" Smith. He amputated Smith's right arm without morphia, and stayed with Smith until they were evacuated by helicopter to Simmanggang. Despite complete exhaustion, he helped with surgery at Simmanggang and at Kuching. Crawford had already assisted six Gurkha soldiers to escape from the wreckage of the helicopter, there was a great danger of the remnants of the helicopter going up in flames, before he found Smith badly injured, trapped in the wreckage, and saved his life.[2]
