= XXXIV Corps =

XXXIV Corps or 34th Corps may refer to:

- XXXIV Corps (British India)
- XXXIV Army Corps (Wehrmacht)
- 34th Army Corps (Russian Empire)
- 34th Rifle Corps, Soviet Union
- 34th (1st Rifle Rangers) Lanarkshire Rifle Volunteer Corps
- 34th Kent (Deptford Town Artisans) Rifle Volunteer Corps
- 34th (Saddleworth) Yorkshire West Riding Rifle Volunteer Corps
- 34th Corps (Vietnam)

== See also ==
- List of military corps by number
- 34th Army (disambiguation)
- 34th Division (disambiguation)
- 34th Brigade (disambiguation)
- 34th Regiment (disambiguation)
- 34th Battalion (disambiguation)
- 34th Squadron (disambiguation)
- 34th (disambiguation)
