= 34th Cavalry =

34th Cavalry may refer to:

- 34th Cavalry Division (Soviet Union)
- 34th Texas Cavalry Regiment, Confederate States Army
- 34th Virginia Cavalry Battalion, Confederate States Army
- 34th Prince Albert Victor's Own Poona Horse
- 34th (Middlesex) Company, Imperial Yeomanry

== See also ==
- 34th Division (disambiguation)
- 34th Brigade (disambiguation)
- 34th Regiment (disambiguation)
- 34th (disambiguation)
