= 34th Army =

34th Army may refer to:

- Thirty-Fourth Army (Japan), Imperial Japanese Army
- 34th Army (Soviet Union)
- 34th Air Army, Soviet Union

== See also ==
- List of armies by number
- XXXIV Corps (disambiguation)
- 34th Division (disambiguation)
- 34th Brigade (disambiguation)
- 34th Regiment (disambiguation)
- 34th Battalion (disambiguation)
- 34th Squadron (disambiguation)
- 34th (disambiguation)
