= 34th =

34th is the ordinal form of the number 34. 34th or Thirty-fourth may also refer to:

- A fraction, 1/34, equal to one of 34 equal parts

== Geography ==
- 34th meridian east, a line of longitude
- 34th meridian west, a line of longitude
- 34th parallel north, a circle of latitude
- 34th parallel south, a circle of latitude
- 34th Street (disambiguation)

== Military ==
- 34th Army (disambiguation)
- 34th Battalion (disambiguation)
- 34th Brigade (disambiguation)
- 34th Division (disambiguation)
- 34th Regiment (disambiguation)
- 34th Squadron (disambiguation)

== Other ==
- Thirty-fourth Amendment
- 34th century
- 34th century BC

== See also ==
- 34 (disambiguation)
