= 34 =

34 may refer to:

- 34 (number), the natural number following 33 and preceding 35
- 34 BC
- AD 34
- 1934
- 2034

== Science ==
- Selenium, a nonmetal in the periodic table
- 34 Circe, an asteroid in the asteroid belt

== Music ==
- 34 (album), 2015, by Dre Murray
- "#34" (song), 1994, by Dave Matthews Band
- "34", a 2006 song by Saves the Day from Sound the Alarm
- "Thirty Four", a song by Karma to Burn from the album Almost Heathen, 2001

== Other uses ==
- +34, the international calling code for Spain

== See also ==
- 34th (disambiguation)
- 3/4 (disambiguation)
- Rule 34 (disambiguation)
- List of highways numbered 34
