= 655th Intelligence, Surveillance and Reconnaissance Wing =

655th Intelligence, Surveillance and Reconnaissance Wing
- Active: 20 September 2018–present
- Country: United States
- Branch: United States Air Force
- Role: Intelligence
- Part of: Air Force Reserve Command: Tenth Air Force
- Garrison/HQ: Wright-Patterson Air Force Base, Ohio

Commanders
- Current commander: Col. Joseph Marcinek

Insignia
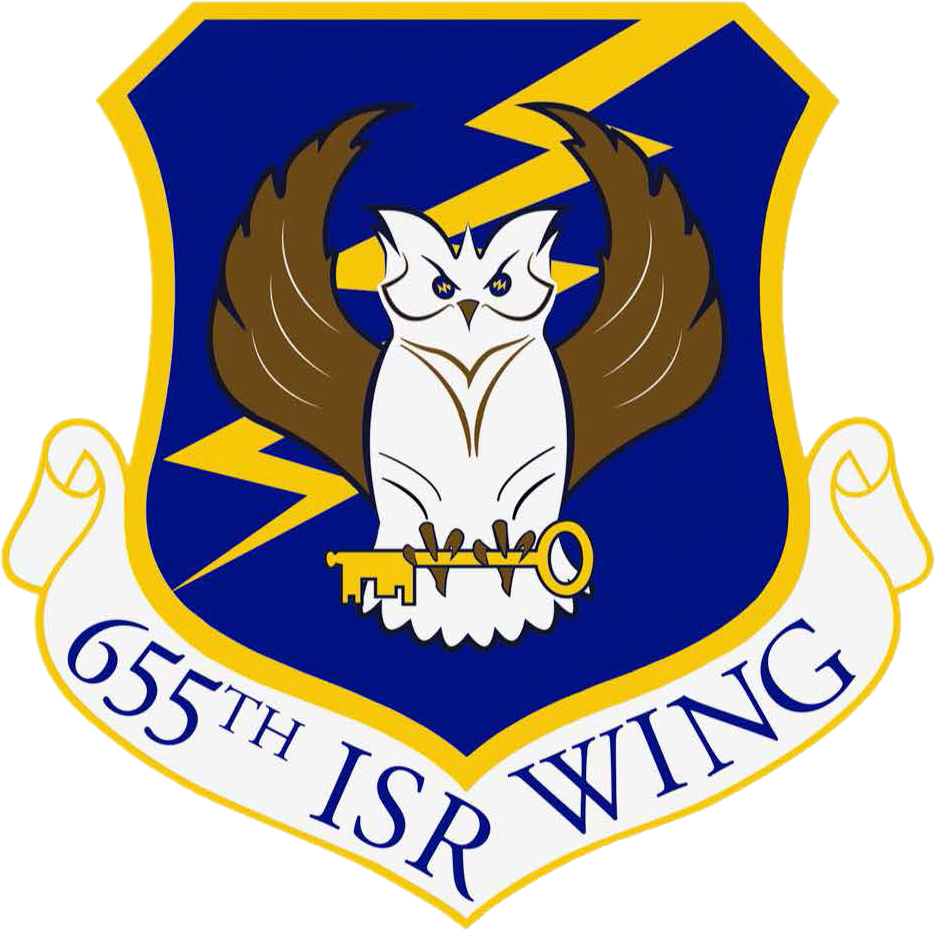
- 655th Intelligence, Surveillance and Reconnaissance Wing

The United States Air Force's 655th Intelligence, Surveillance and Reconnaissance Wing (655 ISRW) is an intelligence unit stationed at Wright-Patterson Air Force Base, Ohio.

One of the wing's new squadrons was activated in mid-2011, the 718th Intelligence Squadron at Joint Base Langley–Eustis. The squadron was first constituted on 29 April 2011 and activated on 1 May 2011. It does not share a history with any other unit prior to April 2011. A formal ceremony was held to mark the activation of the squadron on 7 June 2011.

== Units ==
As of early 2019, the 655th ISR Wing was made up of:

- 655th Intelligence, Surveillance and Reconnaissance Group (655 ISRG) (Wright-Patterson Air Force Base, Ohio)
  - 14th Intelligence Squadron (14 IS) (Wright-Patterson Air Force Base, Ohio)
  - 16th Intelligence Squadron (16 IS) (Fort Meade, Maryland)
  - 23rd Intelligence Squadron (23 IS) (Joint Base San Antonio, Texas)
  - 49th Intelligence Squadron (49 IS) (Offutt Air Force Base, Nebraska)
  - 64th Intelligence Squadron (64 IS) (Wright-Patterson Air Force Base, Ohio)
  - 71st Intelligence Squadron (71 IS) (Wright-Patterson Air Force Base, Ohio)
  - 512th Intelligence Squadron (512 IS) (Fort Meade, Maryland)
- 755th Intelligence, Surveillance and Reconnaissance Group (755 ISRG) (Joint Base Langley-Eustis, Virginia)
  - 28th Intelligence Squadron (28 IS) (Hurlburt Field, Florida)
  - 38th Intelligence Squadron (38 IS) (Beale Air Force Base, California)
  - 42nd Intelligence Squadron (42 IS) (Joint Base Langley-Eustis, Virginia)
  - 50th Intelligence Squadron (50 IS) (Beale Air Force Base, California)
  - 63rd Intelligence Squadron (63 IS) (Joint Base Langley-Eustis, Virginia)
  - 718th Intelligence Squadron (718 IS) (Joint Base Langley-Eustis, Virginia)
  - 820th Intelligence Squadron (820 IS) (Offutt Air Force Base, Nebraska)
