= Z34 =

Z34 may refer to:

- Nissan 370Z, an automobile (chassis code Z34)
- Chevrolet Lumina Z34, an automobile
- German destroyer Z34, a warship
- RFA Z.34 mortar battery; part of the 34th Division (United Kingdom)
- Empire Air Force Station (NORAD id Z-34), Empire, Michigan, USA

== See also ==
- 34 (disambiguation)
- Z (disambiguation)
