= 5th Special Operations Squadron =

5th Special Operations Squadron

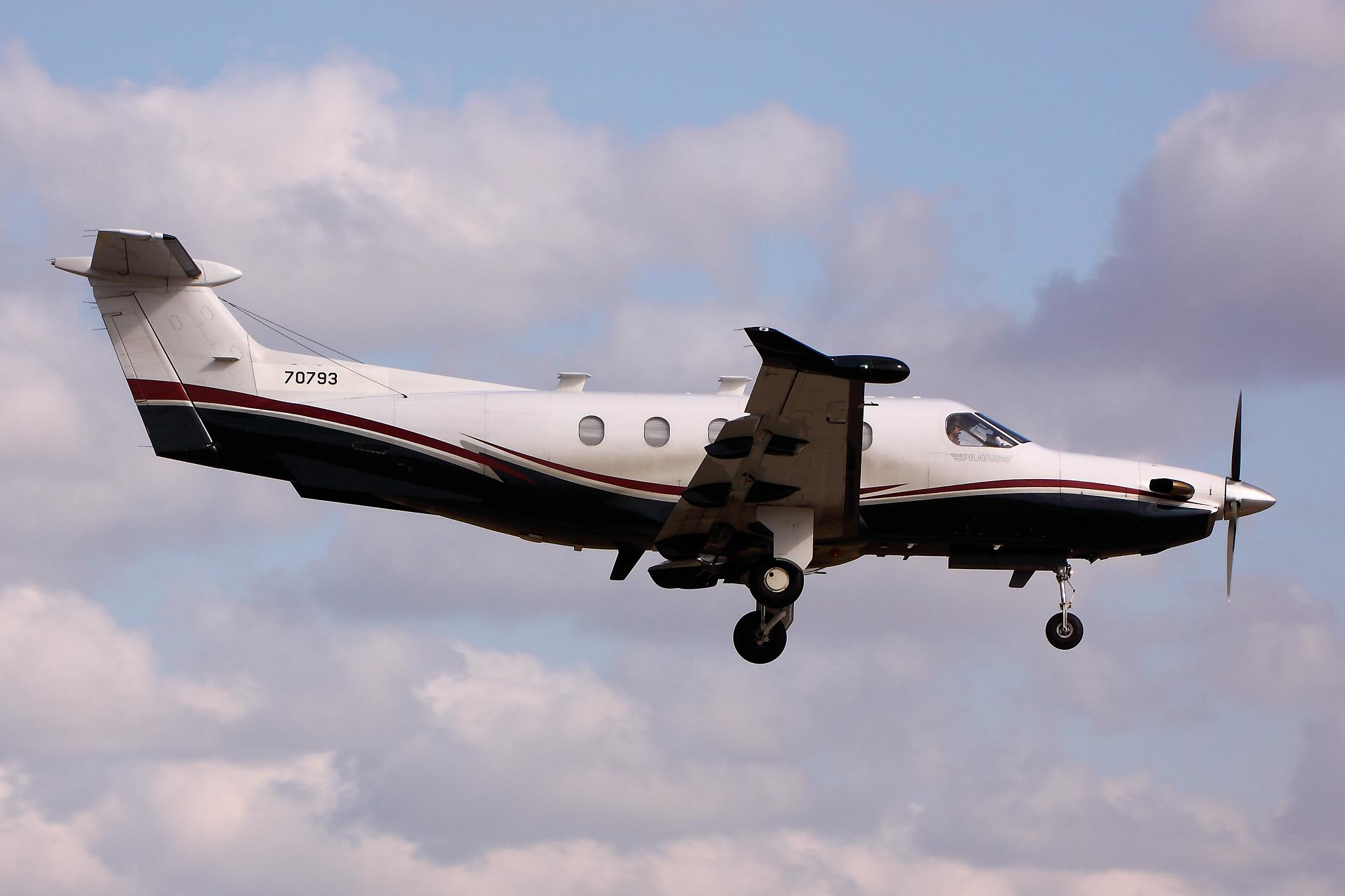
- U-28A as flown by the squadron
- Active: 1944–1946; 1965–1969; 1994–present
- Country: United States
- Branch: United States Air Force
- Role: Special Operations
- Part of: Air Force Special Operations Command
- Garrison/HQ: Hurlburt Field
- Motto: Truth Shall Make Them Free (1965-1969, 2008-present) Combat Shadow (1994-2008)
- Engagements: Vietnam War
- Decorations: Presidential Unit Citation; Gallant Unit Citation; Army Meritorious Unit Commendation; Air Force Outstanding Unit Award with Combat "V" Device; Air Force Outstanding Unit Award; Philippine Presidential Unit Citation; Republic of Vietnam Gallantry Cross with Palm

Insignia
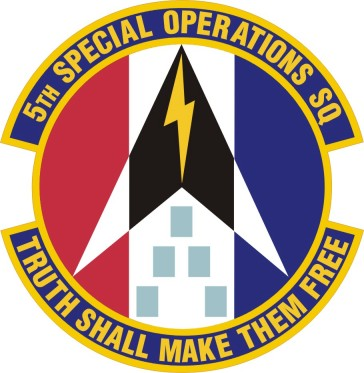
- 5th Special Operations Squadron emblem (Note: Aapproved 5 November 2001, modified 4 January 2008.)

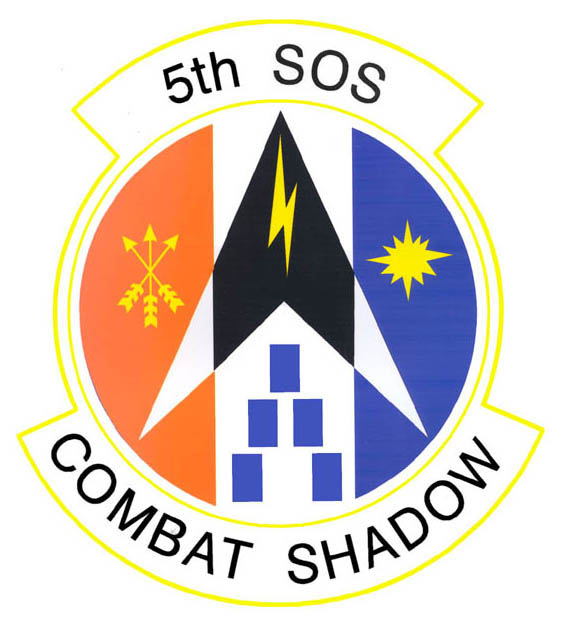
- 5th Special Operations Squadron (Note: Approved 5 August 1966.)

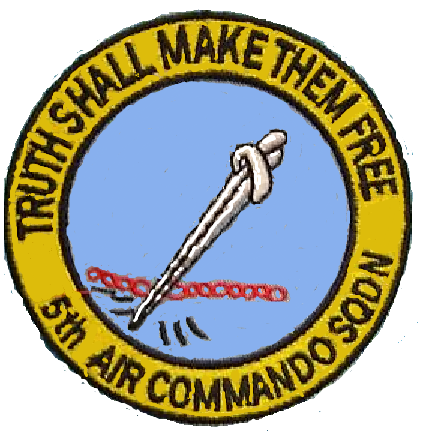
- 5th Air Commando Squadron patch (Vietnam)

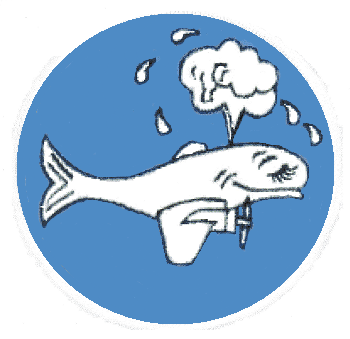
- 5th Combat Cargo Squadron emblem

The 5th Special Operations Squadron is part of the 919th Special Operations Wing. The 5th is based at Hurlburt Field, Florida. It operates U-28 aircraft providing special operations capability.

== Mission ==
The 5th Special Operations Squadron provides an Instructor cadre for the Air Force Special Operations Air Warfare Center's U-28, AC-130J, MC-130H, C-146 and Combat Aviation Advisor programs. It also provides intratheater support to Special Operations Forces worldwide in support of National Command Authorities taskings.

The 5th Special Operations Squadron at Hurlburt Field, Fla., is a Total Force Integration unit whose members participate in the Active Duty mission of the Air Force Special Operations Air Warfare Center at Hurlburt. While 5th SOS members perform duty at Hurlburt as part of AFSOWC, the squadron administratively falls under the 919th Special Operations Wing, a USAF Reserve unit headquartered at Duke Field, Fla.

== History ==
=== World War II ===
The 5th Combat Cargo Squadron was constituted on 25 April 1944, and activated on 1 May at Syracuse Army Air Base, assigned to the 2d Combat Cargo Group. It was equipped with Curtiss C-46 Commando and Douglas C-47 Skytrain transport aircraft. Between 9 and 27 October it was located at Baer Field for overseas processing following the completion of its training. It arrived at Biak in November, flying passengers and cargo to American bases in Australia, New Guinea, the Admiralties, and the Philippines. The unit was also involved in the airdrop of supplies to American and guerrilla forces in the Philippines. The 5th moved forward to Dulag on Leyte in May 1945. It continued flights to bases in Australia, New Guinea, and the Philippines, and transported personnel and supplies to the Ryukyus, evacuating casualties on the return flights. On 16 August, the day after Japan surrendered, the squadron moved to Okinawa, transporting occupation forces personnel and equipment to Japan and ferrying liberated prisoners of war to the Philippines. In September, the 5th Combat Cargo Squadron relocated to Yokota Air Base, where it was inactivated on 15 January 1946 and disbanded on 8 October 1948.

=== Vietnam war ===
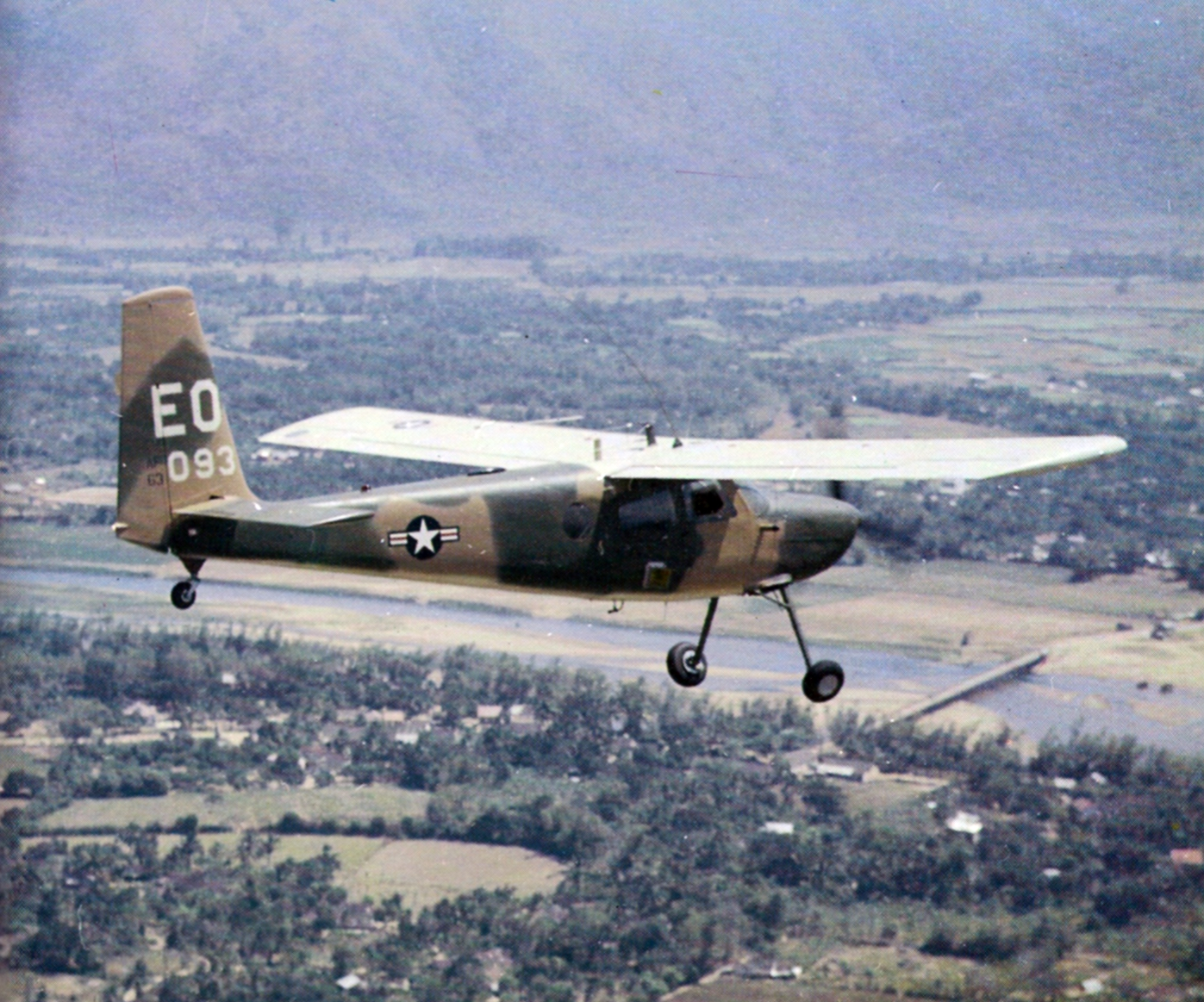
A 5th SOS U-10B over Vietnam, 1969.

The second predecessor of the squadron was organized as the 5th Air Commando Squadron at Nha Trang Air Base, South Vietnam in August 1965. It conducted psychological operations and humanitarian programs during the Vietnam War until it was inactivated in October 1969.

=== Air Force Reserve ===
The two squadrons were consolidated as the 5th Special Operations Squadron in 1985, but remained inactive. In 1994, the squadron was activated in the reserves at Duke Field, Florida, 919th Special Operations Wing. It has trained for special operations, Air refueling of special operations helicopters, and resupply missions, using modified C-130 aircraft from 1995 to 2008. The 5th has periodically deployed to support special operations contingency operations worldwide. Since late 2007. it has provided instructors for active duty students training to operate Pilatus U-28 aircraft.

=== Operations ===

Vietnam War

Operation Enduring Freedom

Operation Iraqi Freedom

== Lineage ==
5th Combat Cargo Squadron

- Constituted as the 5th Combat Cargo Squadron on 25 April 1944

Activated on 1 May 1944
Inactivated on 15 January 1946

- Disbanded on 8 October 1948
- Reconstituted and consolidated with the 5th Special Operations Squadron as the 5th Special Operations Squadron on 19 September 1985

5th Special Operations Squadron

- Constituted as the 5th Air Commando Squadron (Psychological Operation) and activated on 2 August 1965 (not organized)

Organized on 8 August 1965
Redesignated 5th Special Operations Squadron on 1 August 1968
Inactivated on 15 October 1969

- Consolidated with the 5th Combat Cargo Squadron on 19 September 1985
- Activated 1 December 1994, Air Force Reserve Command at Duke Field, Eglin AFB Base. Aircraft used was MC-130N/P tankers.

=== Assignments ===
- 2d Combat Cargo Group, 1 May 1944 – 15 January 1946
- Pacific Air Forces, 2 August 1965 (not organized)
- 2d Air Division, 8 August 1965
- 14th Air Commando Wing (later 14th Special Operations Wing), 8 March 1966 – 15 October 1969
- 919th Operations Group (later 919th Special Operations Group), 1 December 1994
- 492d Special Operations Wing, c. 10 May 2017 – present

=== Stations ===
- Syracuse Army Air Base, New York, 1 May 1944
- Baer Field, Indiana, 9–27 October 1944
- Biak, Netherlands East Indies, November 1944
- Dulag Airfield, Leyte, Philippines, 15 May 1945
- Okinawa, 16 August 1945
- Yokota Air Base, Japan, September 1945 – 15 January 1946
- Nha Trang Air Base, South Vietnam, 8 August 1965
- Tuy Hoa Air Base, South Vietnam, 5 September - 15 October 1969
- Duke Field, Florida, 1 December 1994
- Eglin Air Force Base, Florida, 1 October 1999
- Hurlburt Field, Florida, 26 January 2009 – present

=== Aircraft ===
- Curtiss C-46 Commando (1944–1945)
- Douglas C-47 Skytrain (1944–1945)
- Helio U-10 Courier (1965–1969)
- Lockheed MC-130P Combat Shadow (1994–2008)
- Pilatus U-28A (2008–present)
- Lockheed MC-130H Combat Talon II (2015–2008)
- Lockheed AC-130U Spooky II (2013–2008)
