= Hurlburt Field =

US Air Force base in Florida, United States

- Mary Esther, Florida in United States
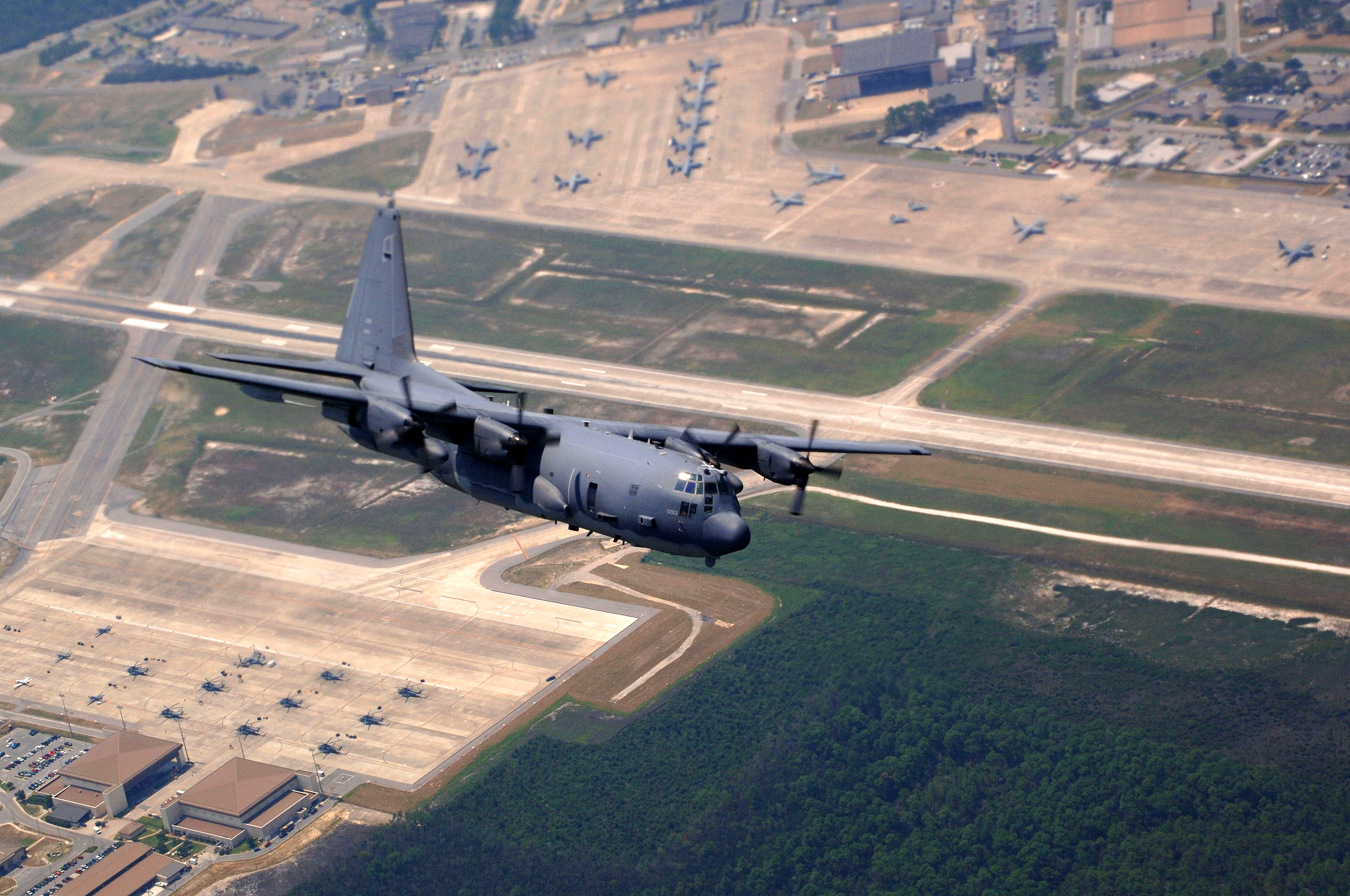
- An AC-130U Spooky over Hurlburt Field

Site information
- Type: US Air Force base
- Owner: Department of Defense
- Operator: US Air Force
- Controlled by: Air Force Special Operations Command (AFSOC)
- Condition: Operational
- Website: www.hurlburt.af.mil

Location
- Location within Florida Location within the United States Location within North America Location within North Atlantic Location within Gulf of Mexico
- Coordinates: 30°25′40″N 086°41′22″W

Site history
- Built: 1942
- In use: 1942 – present

Garrison information
- Current commander: Colonel Allison "Angel of Death" Black
- Garrison: 1st Special Operations Wing

Airfield information
- Identifiers: IATA: HRT, ICAO: KHRT, FAA LID: HRT, WMO: 747770
- Elevation: 11.5 metres (38 ft) AMSL
Runways
| Direction | Length and surface |
|---|---|
| 18/36 | 2,926 metres (9,600 ft) concrete |
Helipads
| Number | Length and surface |
|---|---|
| H18/H36 | 490.1 metres (1,608 ft) concrete |

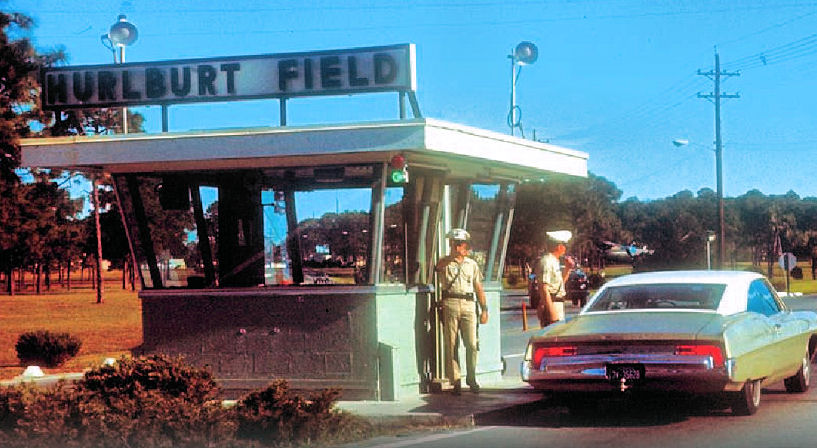
Main gate (about 1967)

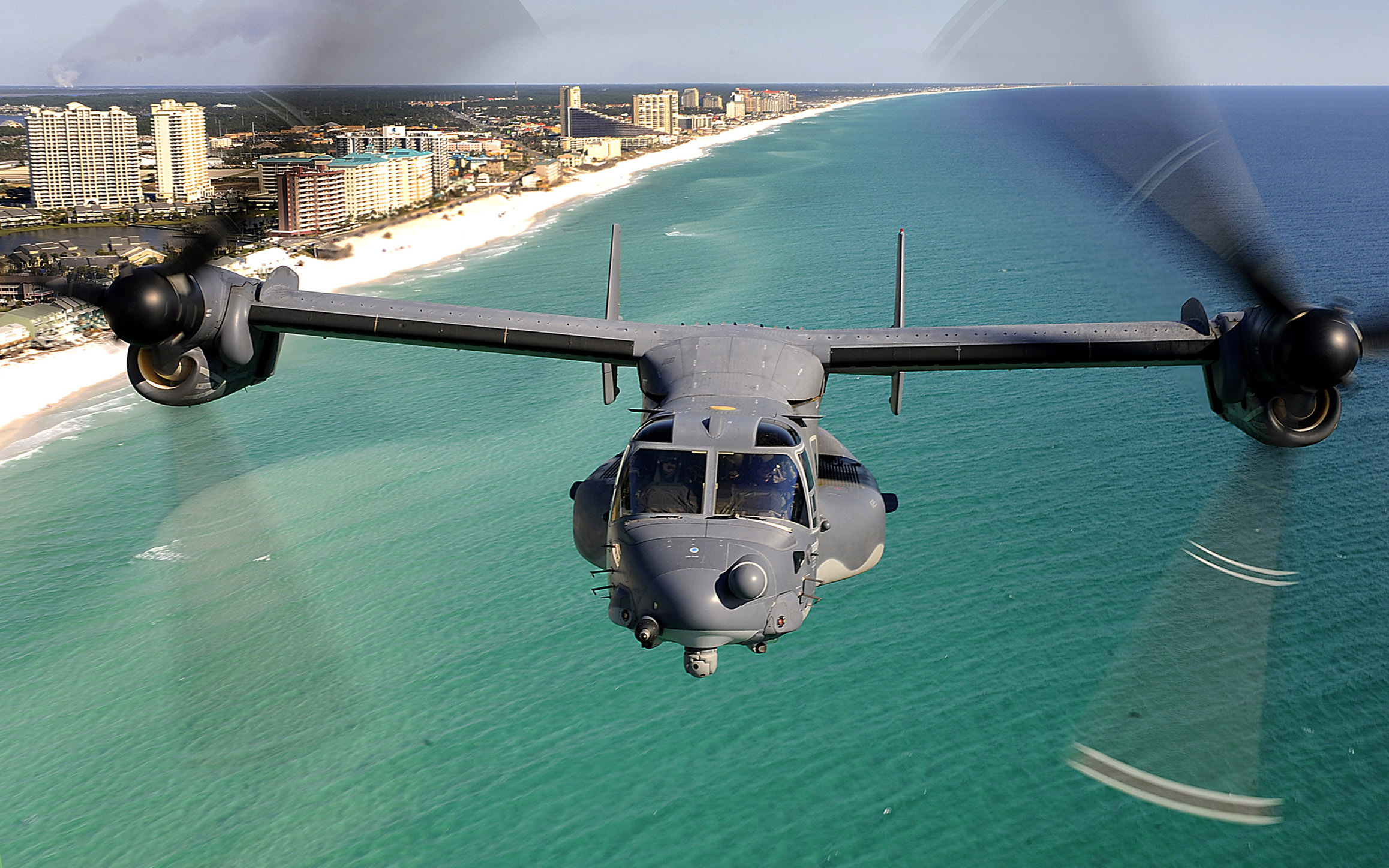
A CV-22 Osprey aircraft from the 8th Special Operations Squadron flies over the Emerald Coast outside Hurlburt Field, Fla., on 31 January 2009. While over the water, the crew practiced using a hoist, which is used to rescue stranded personnel.

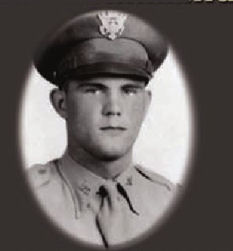
First Lieutenant Donald Wilson Hurlburt

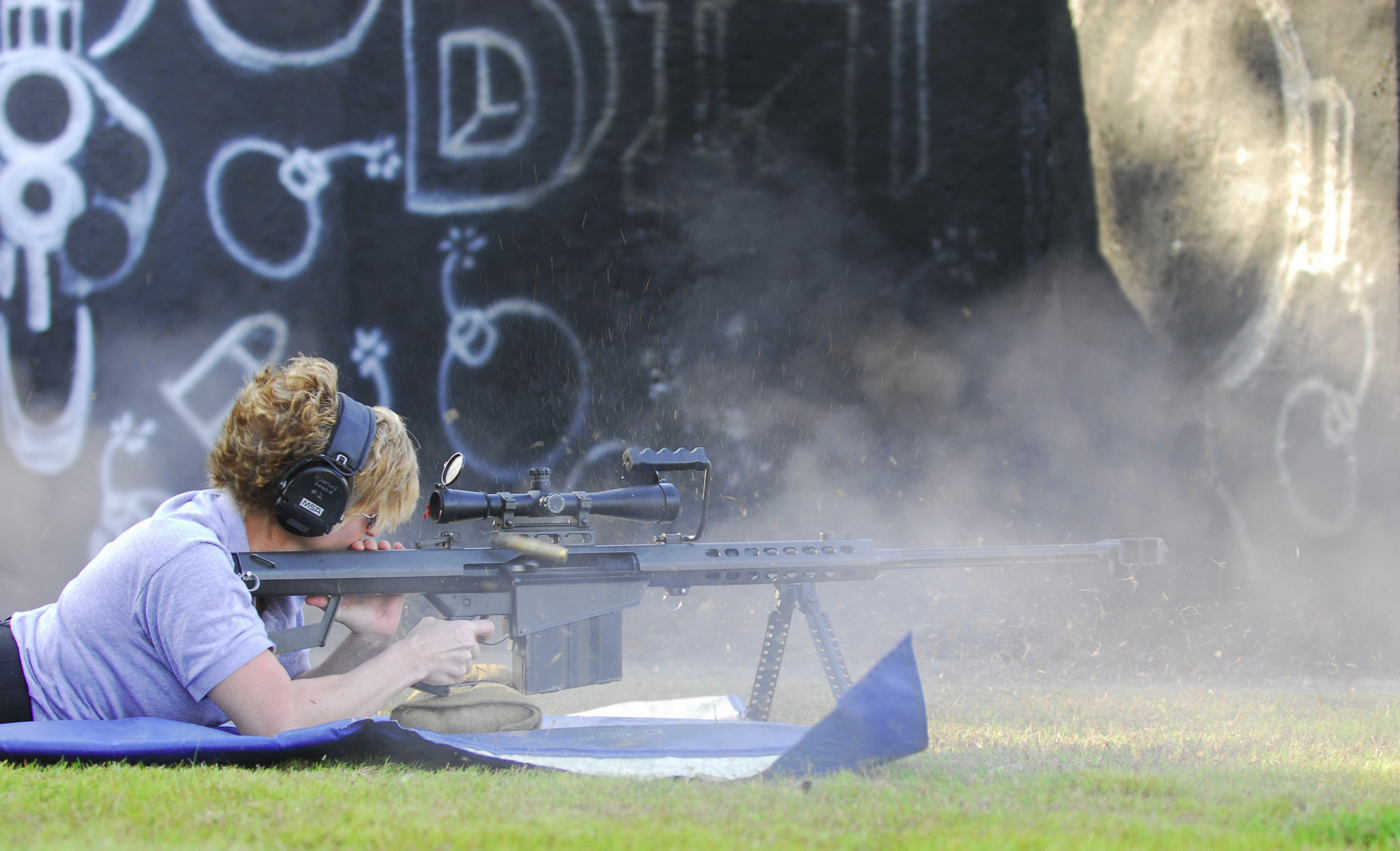
U.S. Air Force MSgt Tanya Breed demonstrates a Barrett .50 caliber rifle during a special operations training course at Hurlburt Field.

Hurlburt Field (ICAO: KHRT, FAA LID: HRT) is a United States Air Force base located in Okaloosa County, Florida, immediately west of the town of Mary Esther. It is part of the greater Eglin Air Force Base reservation and is home to Headquarters Air Force Special Operations Command (AFSOC), the 1st Special Operations Wing (1 SOW), the USAF Special Operations School (USAFSOS) and the Air Combat Command's (ACC) 505th Command and Control Wing. It was named for First Lieutenant Donald Wilson Hurlburt, who died in a crash at Eglin. The installation is nearly 6,700 acres (27 km^{2}) and employs nearly 8,000 military personnel.

This facility is assigned a three-letter location identifier of HRT by the Federal Aviation Administration, but it does not have an International Air Transport Association (IATA) airport code (the IATA assigned HRT to RAF Linton-on-Ouse in England).

== History ==
Hurlburt began as a small training field for the much larger Eglin Field. It was initially designated Eglin Auxiliary Field No. 9, and later as Eglin Air Force Base Auxiliary Field 9/Hurlburt Field when the U.S. Air Force became an independent service, before being administratively separated from the rest of the Eglin AFB complex in the 1950s. However, once separated, the facility retained its history and kept all building numbers the same; i.e., all start with a "9". The installation was named by then-Eglin Field base commander Brigadier General Grandison Gardner for First Lieutenant Donald Wilson Hurlburt (1919–1943), who was killed in an aircraft crash at the main base, then known as Eglin Field, in 1943.

The facility had previously been named the Eglin-Hurlburt Airdrome until 1943; Hurlburt Field, March 1944; Eglin Auxiliary Field No. 9, October 1944; with the current name official on 13 January 1948. The base commander of Eglin Main was also responsible for Hurlburt, 1942–1946, but when the base reactivated on 1 February 1955, it gained a separate commander.

=== Drones and missiles ===
Gulf-facing launch sites for drones beginning with Republic-Ford JB-2 Loons, American copies of the V-1 "buzz bombs", were operated on Santa Rosa Island, from Site A-15, directly south of Field 9 from the fall of 1944 in anticipation of Operation Olympic against Japan from captured Pacific island bases. The atomic missions put paid to this operation. This launch site is now on the National Register of Historic Places.

The 4751st Air Defense Wing (Missile) was organized at Hurlburt on 1 October 1957. It was redesignated the 4751st Air Defense Missile Wing on 15 January 1958 and discontinued on 1 July 1962 when Tactical Air Command took over the field. Its subordinate 4751st Air Defense Missile Squadron continued operations as a tenant until 30 November 1979. It operated IM-99/CIM-10 Bomarc surface-to-air missiles from this site. On 18 August 1960, a Bomarc missile from the Santa Rosa launch facility made a direct hit on its target, a QB-47E drone of the 3205th Drone Group, marking the first shoot-down of a multi-jet medium bomber by a surface-to-air missile.

The 6555th Guided Missile Wing operated CGM-13/TGM-13 Mace cruise missiles from the island. On 5 January 1967 an international incident was narrowly avoided when a TGM-13 Mace, launched from Santa Rosa Island, which was supposed to circle over the Gulf on a racetrack course for shoot-down by a pair of Eglin F-4 Phantoms, instead, headed south for Cuba. A third F-4 overtook the drone, firing two test AAMs with no effect, and damaged it with cannon fire, but the unarmed Mace actually overflew the western tip of Cuba before crashing in open water some 100 miles (160 km) further south. The final Mace launches from Hurlburt Site A-15 took place in June 1974. Other launches in the 1960s included six high-altitude releases of vaporized barium from 2-stage Nike Iroquois sounding rockets in January 1967 to measure wind speeds and directions in the upper atmosphere, conducted under the auspices of the Air Force Cambridge Research Laboratories in conjunction with the Space Systems Branch of the Aircraft and Missile Test Division, Air Proving Ground Center, Eglin AFB.

=== Tactical bombardment ===
Hurlburt Field fell into disrepair following World War II but was reactivated in 1955. The 17th Bombardment Wing was reactivated on 1 April 1955 and assigned to the Ninth Air Force, with the 34th, 37th, and 95th Bomb Squadrons assigned under the 17th Bomb Group. "Officers and airmen of the 17th crossed the Pacific in three echelons. Some flew their B-26's [sic] from Miho Air Base, Japan, to Florida. The main body made the trip on the troop ship General Gaffney, while another group, comprising airmen from other Fifth Air Force units, arrived in San Francisco in early April 1955, aboard the pocket aircraft carrier, the Cape Esperance."

The 17th Bomb Wing was stationed at Eglin AFB, Florida, operating from Hurlburt Field, where it was programmed to receive the Martin B-57 Canberra, the replacement for the B-26 Invader. However, the B-57 proved to be troublesome and unreliable and only three or four were ever delivered to Hurlburt. On 1 October 1955, Hurlburt was redesignated the 17th Bombardment Wing, Tactical, and received B-66 aircraft in early 1956.

The first jet aircraft to land at Hurlburt was a Lockheed T-33 Shooting Star which arrived from Ninth Air Force Headquarters, Shaw AFB, South Carolina, on 28 July 1955, piloted by Maj. J. H. Murrow and Maj. L. F. Collins. "Pilots of the 17th Bomb Wing will in the near future be flying T-33's [sic] for instrument and transitional training to prepare for the new B-66 bomber which is slated for delivery to the wing..." The first B-66 arrived at Hurlburt on 16 March 1956, after a flight from Norton AFB, California, piloted by 17th Bomb Wing commander Col. Howard F. Bronson, with Col. Norton W. Sanders, commanding officer of the 17th Bomb Group, as observer.

The 17th Bomb Wing was equipped with the Douglas B-66B Destroyer and operated the jet light bomber at Hurlburt from 1956 until 1958, then the wing was moved to a base in England. The 17th was inactivated on 25 June 1958 due to budgetary cutbacks.

With the reactivation of Hurlburt, housing was at a premium, and Lieutenant Colonel Robert S. Kramer, Assistant Army District Engineer at Mobile, Alabama, announced on 5 April 1956, that a contract had been awarded in the amount of $3,315,143.34 to the McDonough Construction Company, Atlanta, Georgia, for the construction of 151 buildings of concrete block with brick facing. Residences would be single and duplex quarters with two, three, and four bedrooms. Construction began on the first 48 buildings (72 units) in mid-April, with initial completion expected by February 1957.

=== Special operations ===
On 14 April 1961 the Air Force Tactical Air Command (TAC) activated the 4400th Combat Crew Training Squadron at Hurlburt, to fly operations against guerrillas, either as an overt Air Force operation or in an undefined covert capacity. Known by its nickname "Jungle Jim", the unit was commanded by Colonel Benjamin H. King. The squadron was authorized 16 C-47s, eight B-26s and eight T-28 Trojans, plus the same number of aircraft in temporary storage. The T-28s were armed with caliber .50 machine guns, 2.75-in. rockets and a small quantity of bombs. These specialists flew missions in Africa, Southeast Asia, Central America and other places throughout the world. In early 1962, plans for the never executed Operation Northwoods called for decoy aircraft to land at this base.

From the 1960s into the early 1970s, the base hosted a wide variety of aircraft types, including A-1E Skyraiders, AC-119G Shadow and AC-119K Stinger gunships, AC-47 Spooky gunships, AC-130A Spectre gunships, B-26K Counter-Invaders (including those deployed to the Congo), UC-123Ks with underwing jet pods, OV-10A Forward Air Control Broncos, Cessna O-2A Skymaster FAC and O-2B PSYOPS aircraft, QU-22B recon drones, and other long-serving C-47s in various support roles. Following the conclusion of the war in Southeast Asia, most reciprocating engine types were retired by the USAF. UH-1s and CH-3s were operated, the latter by the 20th Special Operations Squadron.

The 4410th Combat Crew Training Wing was activated at Hurlburt Field on 1 December 1965, later moving to England AFB, Louisiana, in July 1969. "In early 1967 the wing comprised four squadrons; two were at Hurlburt, the 4408th CCTS training C-123 crews and the 4409th training A-1E and T-28 pilots, including Vietnamese students. The 4410th CCTS at Holley Field primarily trained O-1 Forward Air Controllers and students flying the U-10 and O-2. In December the 4407th CCTS would be activated to assume the mission of the 4410th while that unit began training crews in the new OV-10 Bronco FAC aircraft. The fourth squadron, the 4412th CCTS was at England AFB, training C-47D and AC-47D pilots. On 1 April the 4532nd CCTS was activated to fly A-37Bs and assigned to the Wing. Later in the year both the 4412th and 4532nd were reassigned to the 1st ACW at England AFB."

The first jet-augmented Fairchild C-123K Provider arrived at Hurlburt Field on 5 January 1968, and the first of 76 of the type to be ferried to Vietnam by the 319th Air Commando Squadron departed on 10 April.

The 20th Special Operations Squadron reactivated in 1976 at Hurlburt Field, the unit mission remaining unconventional warfare and special operations using UH-1N gunships and CH-3Es. The HH-53H Pave Low replaced the CH-3E in 1980, providing a long range, heavier lift helicopter capability. "The Air Force's newly operational fleet of nine HH-53H Pave Low CSAR helicopters was abruptly transferred to the special operations forces in response to the failed Iranian hostage rescue attempt and the lack of dedicated long-range vertical lift platforms." "The helicopters brought 200 new military jobs to Hurlburt, bringing the number of military positions at the base to 3,200."

In the early 1960s, Hurlburt was utilized as a Strategic Air Command dispersal base for B-47s of the 306th Bomb Wing at MacDill AFB, Florida.

Most facilities were located west of the runway, including hangars, through the 1980s. With the growth and importance of special operation capabilities, Lockheed AC-130 Spectre/Spooky gunship and MC-130 Combat Talon/Combat Spear operations have remained on the western flight line, while additional hangars and ramps have been constructed northeast of the intersection of the main runway and the Doolittle runway. These newer facilities are home to CV-22 Osprey operations of the 413th Flight Test Squadron of the 96th Test Wing, and the recently retired MH-53J Pave Low III and MH-53M Pave Low IV helicopter. The Air Force Special Operations Command continues to fly sensitive operations missions from Hurlburt Field worldwide.

The USAF Special Operations School (USAFSOS) trains US Air Force, Army, Navy, Marine Corps, Coast Guard and US government civilian personnel in a variety of courses, including courses in Dynamics of International Terrorism, and the Middle East Orientation Course.

The Joint Special Operations University (JSOU) was previously located at Hurlburt Field until its relocation to MacDill AFB in 2011. JSOU's lecturers include specialists from all branches of the US military, the US Department of State, Central Intelligence Agency, civilian universities, and nongovernmental organizations.

The Florida Air National Guard activated the 249th Special Operations Squadron at Hurlburt Field on 28 August 2020. The squadron, part of the 125th Fighter Wing, operates the CV-22B Osprey and is assigned to Air Force Special Operations Command.

== Facilities ==
Hurlburt Field has a 9,600 by 150 feet (2,926 m × 46 m) runway designated 18/36 and a 1,608 by 90 feet (490 m × 27 m) helipad, both with concrete surfaces.

Base housing is located across from the main base divided by U.S. 98 along the beachfront of Santa Rosa Sound.

The Reef is the main dining facility on base and has won the title of best dining facility in the Air Force nine times.

A grade-separated intersection at the main gate with a fly-over on U.S. 98 was completed in the summer of 2015, greatly relieving a long-time traffic bottleneck.

== Airpark ==
Starting in 1970s there was an effort to preserve the history of Air Commando operations and the Airmen involved. As part of this effort aircraft of significance were collected and memorials erected to significant operations and individuals dating back to World War II. The air park was open to the general public via special pass until the enhanced security of the post 9/11 era was enacted resulting in the park currently being inaccessible to the general public.

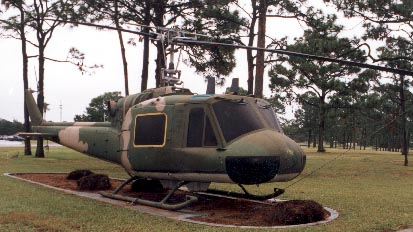
UH-1P on display at Hurlburt Field

| Type | S/N | Service | Note |
|---|---|---|---|
| Fairchild AC-119G SHADOW | 53-3144 | 1954 - 1975 | Served as a crop duster after end of its military service. |
| Curtiss C-46 Commando | 44-77424 | 1944 - 1955 | Korean War veteran |
| B-25J Mitchell | 43-28222 | 1944 - 1957 | |
| Douglas A-1 Skyraider | 52-132598 | 1954 - 1971 | |
| Sikorsky HH-3E Jolly Green Giant | 65-12784 | 1966 - 1990 | Vietnam veteran |
| Douglas A-26A COUNTER INVADER | 64-17666 | ???? - 1970 | Vietnam veteran. S/N changed when reactivated in 1964. |
| Fairchild C-123K Provider | 55-4533 | 1956 - 1980 | Stationed at Tan Son Nhut AB, Vietnam |
| C-47 Skytrain | 43-15510 | 1944 - 1949 | Operation OVERLORD & Berlin Airlift veteran. Modified to appear as an AC-47 prior to display, although it never served as a gunship operationally. |
| Lockheed AC-130A SPECTRE | 56-0509 | 1957 - 1994 | Vietnam & Desert Storm veteran |
| Lockheed AC-130H SPECTRE | 69-6575 | 1969 - 2012 | Operation Just Cause, Operation Desert Storm, & Operation Enduring Freedom veteran. |
| Cessna A-37 Dragonfly | 70-1293 | 1970 - 1988 | |
| Bell UH-1P IROQUOIS | 64-15493 | 1964 - 1980 | Vietnam veteran. Modified for psychological operations. |
| North American T-28 Trojan | 49-1663 | 1951 - 1973 | |
| North American Rockwell OV-10 Bronco | 67-14626 | 1968 - 2000 | Served with the 504th Tactical Air Support Group, Bien Hoa AB during the Vietnam War. Later served as a ground maintenance trainer. |
| Cessna O-1 Bird Dog | 56-4208 | 1957 - 1973 | |
| Cessna O-2 Skymaster | 67-21368 | 1967 - 1982 | Served at Bien Hoa AB, Vietnam |
| U-10A SUPER COURIER | 62-3606 | 1961 - 1971 | |
| Lockheed MC-130E COMBAT TALON I | 64-0567 | 1965 - ???? | Exfiltrated Manuel Noriega from Panama on 2 Jan. 1990 |
| Lockheed MC-130P COMBAT SHADOW | 65-099 | 1965 - 1996 | |
| Sikorsky MH-53 PAVE LOW | 68-10928 | 1970 - 2007 | Iraq War veteran |

== Based units ==
Flying and notable non-flying units based at Hurlburt Field.

Units marked GSU are Geographically Separate Units, which although based at Hurlburt, are subordinate to a parent unit based at another location.

=== United States Air Force ===
Air Force Special Operations Command (AFSOC)

- Headquarters Air Force Special Operations Command
- 1st Special Operations Wing (host)
  - 1st Special Operations Air Operations Squadron
  - 1st Special Operations Comptroller Squadron
  - 1st Special Operations Group
    - 1st Special Operations Support Squadron
    - 4th Special Operations Squadron – AC-130J Ghostrider, AC-130U Spooky
    - 8th Special Operations Squadron – CV-22B Osprey
    - 11th Special Operations Intelligence Squadron
    - 15th Special Operations Squadron – MC-130J Commando II
    - 23rd Special Operations Weather Squadron
    - 34th Special Operations Squadron – U-28A Draco
    - 65th Special Operations Squadron – MQ-9A Reaper
    - 73rd Special Operations Squadron – AC-130J Ghostrider
    - 319th Special Operations Squadron – U-28A Draco
    - Detachment 1 – AC-130J Ghostrider
  - 1st Special Operations Maintenance Group
    - 1st Special Operations Aircraft Maintenance Squadron
    - 1st Special Operations Maintenance Squadron
    - 1st Special Operations Munitions Squadron
    - 801st Special Operations Aircraft Maintenance Squadron
    - 15th Special Operations Aircraft Maintenance Squadron
  - 1st Special Operations Mission Support Group
    - 1st Special Operations Civil Engineer Squadron
    - 1st Special Operations Communications Squadron
    - 1st Special Operations Contracting Squadron
    - 1st Special Operations Force Support Squadron
    - 1st Special Operations Logistics Readiness Squadron
    - 1st Special Operations Security Forces Squadron
  - 1st Special Operations Medical Group
    - 1st Special Operations Healthcare Operations Squadron
    - 1st Special Operations Medical Readiness Squadron
    - 1st Special Operations Medical Support Squadron
- 24th Special Operations Wing
  - 720th Special Tactics Group
    - 23rd Special Tactics Squadron
    - 720th Operations Support Squadron
- 492nd Special Operations Wing
  - US Air Force Special Operations School
  - 492nd Special Operations Group
    - 18th Flight Test Squadron
    - 19th Special Operations Squadron – AC-130J Ghostrider, AC-130U Spooky, MC-130H Combat Talon II and U-28A Draco
  - 492nd Special Operations Training Group
    - 371st Special Operations Combat Training Squadron
    - 492nd Special Operations Advanced Capabilities Squadron

Air Combat Command (ACC)

- US Air Force Warfare Center
  - 57th Wing
    - USAF Weapons School
      - 14th Weapons Squadron (GSU) – AC-130U Spooky, AC-130W Stinger II, CV-22B Osprey, MC-130H Combat Talon II, MC-130J Commando II and U-28A Draco
  - 505th Command and Control Wing
    - 505th Test and Evaluation Group
      - 84th Radar Evaluation Squadron
      - 605th Test and Evaluation Squadron
    - 505th Training Group
      - 505th Combat Training Squadron
      - 505th Communications Squadron
      - 505th Training Squadron
      - 705th Training Squadron
- Fifteenth Air Force
  - 800th RED HORSE Group
    - 823rd RED HORSE Squadron (GSU)
- Sixteenth Air Force
  - 67th Cyberspace Wing
    - 318th Cyberspace Operations Group
      - 39th Information Operations Squadron (GSU)
  - 363rd Intelligence, Surveillance and Reconnaissance Wing
    - 361st Intelligence, Surveillance, and Reconnaissance Group (GSU)
      - 25th Intelligence Squadron
  - 557th Weather Wing
    - 2nd Weather Group
      - 2nd Combat Weather Systems Squadron (GSU)

Air Force Materiel Command (AFMC)

- 96th Test Wing
  - 96th Operations Group
    - 413th Flight Test Squadron (GSU) – AC-130U Spooky, AC-130J Ghostrider, MC-130H Combat Talon II, CV-22B Osprey, and U-28A Draco

Air Force Reserve Command (AFRC)

- Tenth Air Force
  - 655th Intelligence, Surveillance and Reconnaissance Wing
    - 755th Intelligence, Surveillance and Reconnaissance Group
      - 28th Intelligence Squadron (GSU)
  - 919th Special Operations Wing
    - 919th Special Operations Group
      - 2nd Special Operations Squadron – MQ-9A Reaper (GSU)
      - 5th Special Operations Squadron – U-28A Draco (GSU)
- 556th Red Horse Squadron

Air National Guard (ANG)

- Florida Air National Guard
  - 125th Fighter Wing
    - 249th Special Operations Squadron (GSU) – CV-22B Osprey

== Demographics ==
Hurlburt Field was defined as the Hurlburt Field CDP as of the 2020 United States Census, with a recorded population of 2,176. It is part of the Crestview–Fort Walton Beach–Destin metropolitan area.

== In popular culture ==
- The Transformers 3 movie, in production in September 2010, was filmed in part at Hurlburt Field.

== See also ==
- Florida World War II Army Airfields
- List of United States Air Force installations
