= 28th Intelligence Squadron =

28th Intelligence Squadron

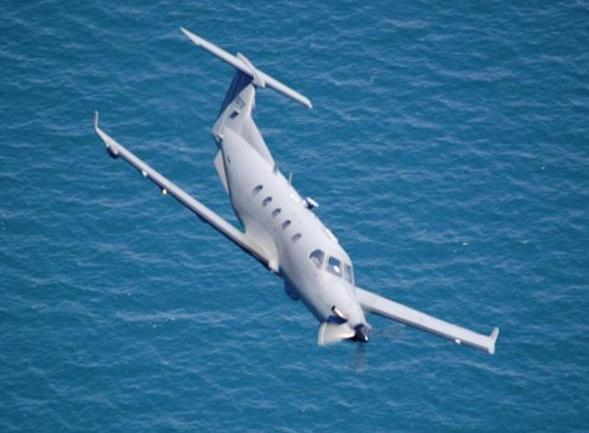
- Pilatus U-28 Special Operations surveillance aircraft
- Active: 1944–1946; 1950–1955; 2014–present
- Country: United States
- Branch: United States Air Force
- Role: Intelligence
- Part of: Air Force Reserve Command
- Garrison/HQ: Hurlburt Field, Florida
- Motto: Exploit the Night
- Engagements: Pacific Theater
- Decorations: Distinguished Unit Citation

Insignia
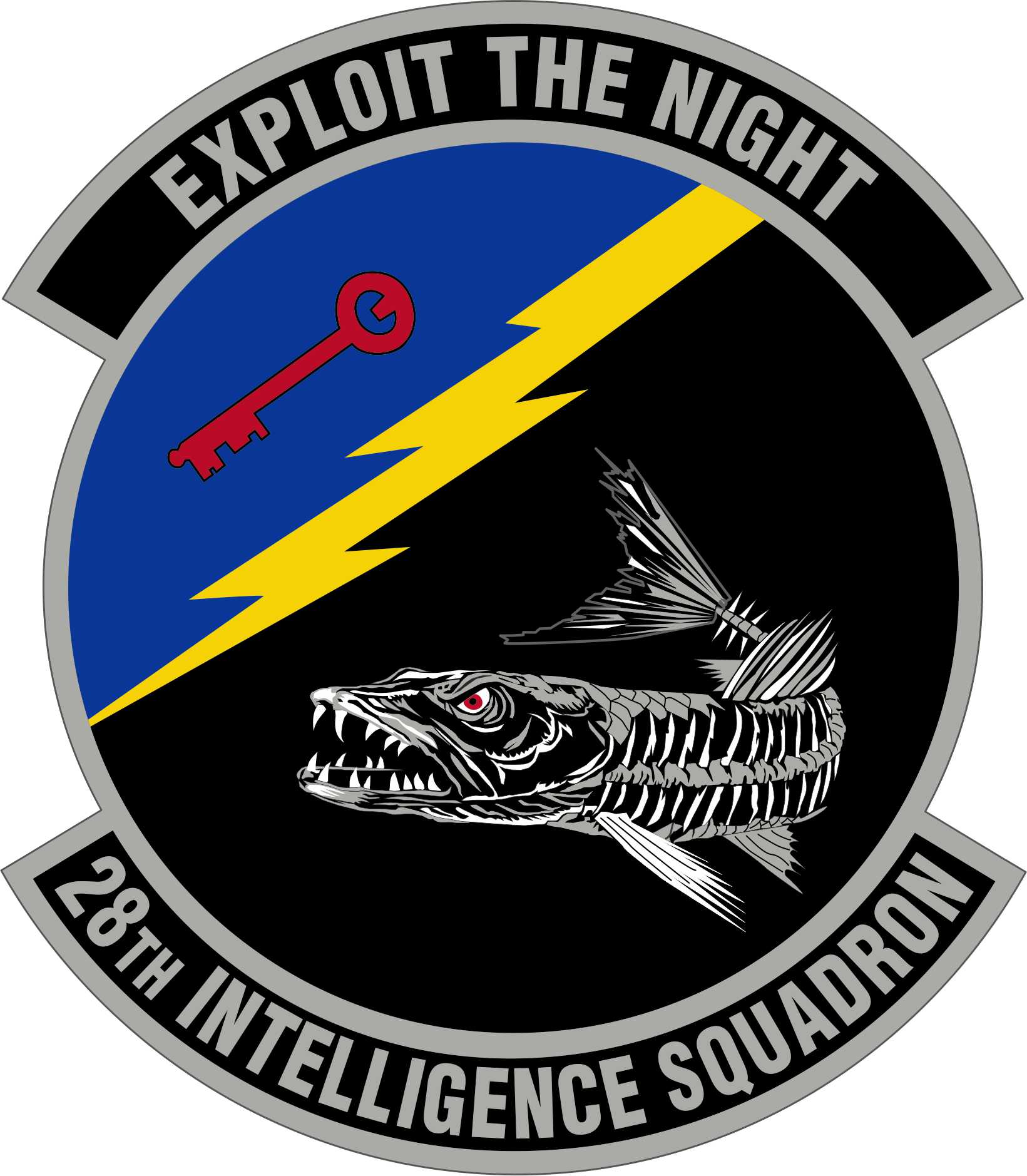
- 28th Intelligence Squadron emblem (approved 31 August 2015)

The United States Air Force's 28th Intelligence Squadron is an intelligence unit located at Hurlburt Field, Florida. The 28th Intelligence Squadron is a classic reserve associate unit supporting the 25th Intelligence Squadron conducting airborne intelligence, surveillance and reconnaissance to provide threat warning to Air Force Special Operations Command. The squadron was previously active during World War II in the Pacific Theater, providing photographic support to a very heavy bomber group and in the early years of the Cold War as a photographic processing and interpretation unit for a strategic reconnaissance wing.

== Mission ==
The squadron is the first reserve tactical systems operator squadron. Its mission is to organize and train personnel to deliver specialized analysis directly to Air Force special operations forces, provide equipment maintenance and configuration, analysis and dissemination, airborne intelligence, surveillance and reconnaissance, and operational support.

== History ==
=== World War II ===
The 28th Photographic Laboratory was activated at Dalhart Army Air Field and assigned to the 501st Bombardment Group, a Boeing B-29 Superfortress unit. After training in the United States under Second Air Force the unit deployed to the Pacific Theater in April 1945, where it was stationed at Northwest Field, Guam as an element of the 315th Bombardment Wing of XXI Bomber Command. The unit received a Distinguished Unit Citation for its support of the 501st Group's attacks on the Maruzen oil refinery at Shimotsu, the Utsubo oil refinery at Yokkaichi, and the petroleum center at Kawasaki. The 28th remained on Guam after V-J Day until it was inactivated in February 1946.

=== Cold War ===
The 28th Reconnaissance Technical Squadron was activated at Rapid City Air Force Base on 1 May 1950, shortly after the 28th Bombardment Wing began to convert to Convair RB-36 Peacemakers as the 28th Strategic Reconnaissance Wing. The squadron took part in Operation Tumbler–Snapper, atmospheric nuclear weapons tests, from 1 April to 5 June 1952 by providing aerial and ground technical and training photography and motion pictures of various operations for the Defense Nuclear Agency. The squadron was inactivated in 1955 when the 28th Wing returned to a primary bombardment mission.

=== Reserve associate unit ===
The 28th Squadron was redesignated the 28th Intelligence Squadron and activated in March 2014 as a reserve associate unit of the 25th Intelligence Squadron at Hurlburt Field, Florida. Six months later, the squadron was consolidated with the World War II photographic laboratory. The squadron achieved full operational capability in April 2016. Squadron operators perform their mission primarily aboard Pilatus U-28 surveillance aircraft.

== Lineage ==
28th Photographic Laboratory

- Constituted as the 28th Photographic Laboratory, Bombardment Group, Very Heavy on 25 May 1944

Activated on 1 August 1944
Inactivated on 22 February 1946
Disbanded on 8 October 1948
Reconstituted and consolidated with the 28th Intelligence Squadron as the 28th Intelligence Squadron on 18 September 2014

28th Intelligence Squadron

- Constituted as the 28th Reconnaissance Technical Squadron on 3 March 1950

Activated on 1 May 1950
Inactivated on 15 April 1955

- Redesignated 28th Intelligence Squadron on 19 March 2014

Activated on 17 April 2014
Consolidated with the 28th Photographic Laboratory on 18 September 2014

=== Assignments ===
- 501st Bombardment Group, 1 August 1944 – 22 February 1946
- 28th Strategic Reconnaissance Wing, 1 May 1950 – 15 April 1955
- 655th Intelligence, Surveillance, and Reconnaissance Group, 17 April 2014 – present

=== Stations ===
- Dalhart Army Air Field, Texas, 1 August 1944
- Harvard Army Air Field, Nebraska, 23 August 1944
- Fort Lawton, Washington, 10–17 March 1945
- Hawaii, 25 March 1945
- Tinian, c. April 1945
- Northwest Field, Guam, c. 14 Apr 1945 – 22 February 1946
- Rapid City Air Force Base (later Ellsworth Air Force Base), South Dakota, 1 May 1950 – 15 April 1955
- Hurlburt Field, Florida, 17 April 2014 – present

=== Awards and campaigns ===
| Award streamer | Award | Dates | Notes |
|---|---|---|---|
| | Distinguished Unit Citation | 6 – 13 July 1945 | 28th Photographic Laboratory |

| Campaign Streamer | Campaign | Dates | Notes |
|---|---|---|---|
| | Air Offensive, Japan | April 1945–2 September 1945 | 28th Photographic Laboratory |
