= United States Air Force Special Operations School =

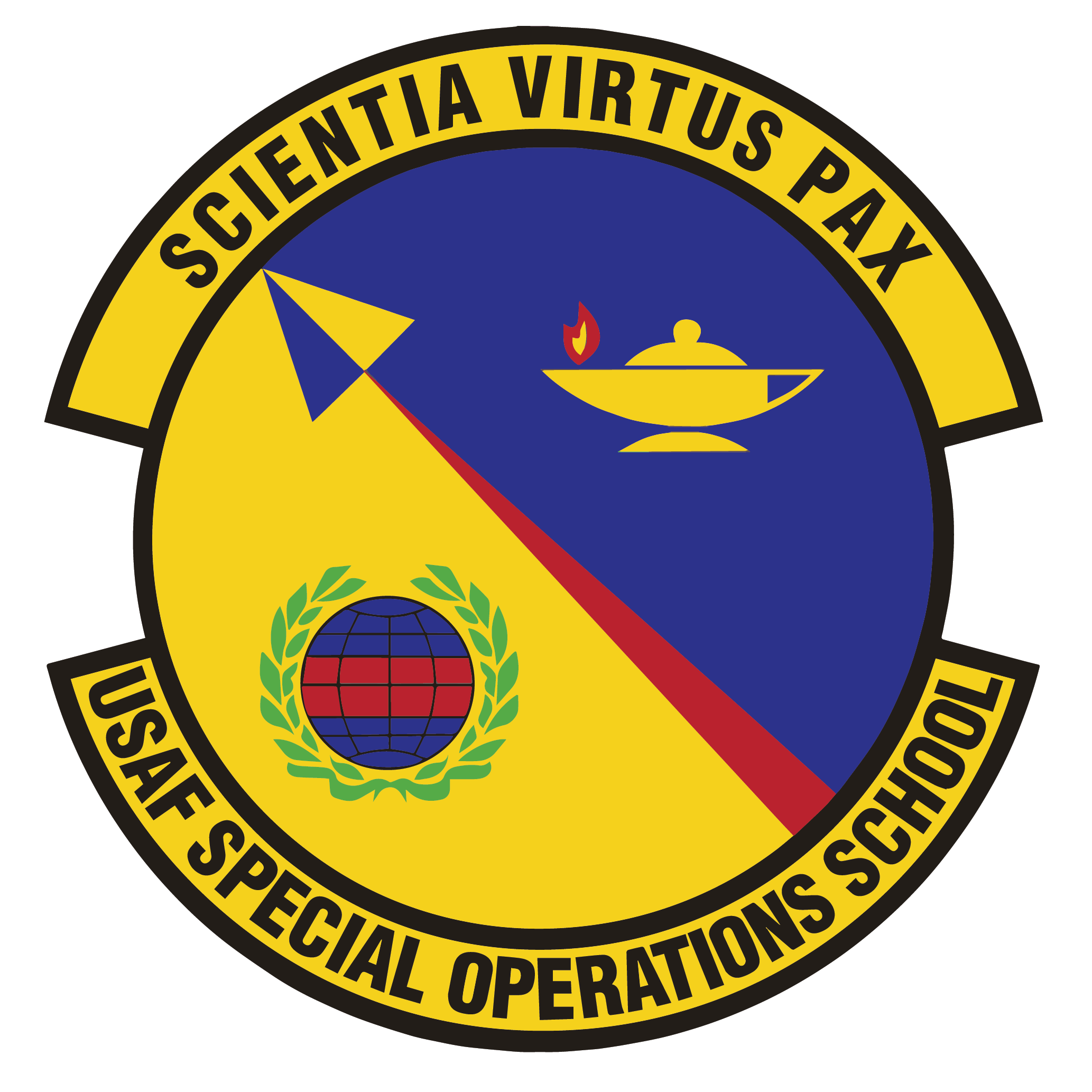
USAFSOS Organizational Emblem

The United States Air Force Special Operations School (USAFSOS) is a school under the Air Commando Development Center, which falls under the Air Force Special Operations Command (AFSOC). AFSOC is the Air Force component of the United States Special Operations Command (USSOCOM).

USAFSOS provides education to turn skilled Airmen into Air Commandos, a term used for U.S. Air Force Special Operators. The school provides specialized education to meet the unique requirements of AFSOC Airmen and joint and international special operations members. USAFSOS builds on the functional training conducted by other agencies like the USAF Air Education and Training Command and Other USSOCOM Service component training schools including Naval Special Warfare Command's Naval Special Warfare Center and U.S. Army Special Operations Command's John F. Kennedy Special Warfare Center and School.

== History ==
The USAF Special Operations School is the product of a 50-year evolutionary process. The process began in March 1961 when President John F. Kennedy, responding to Chairman Nikita S. Khruschev's clarion call for "wars of national liberation," cited the need for countering "subversion and guerilla warfare" that were the heart of Communist insurgency. As a result, the Air Force increased the emphasis given to special air warfare training.

The United States Air Force Special Air Warfare School (USAFSAWS) is situated at Hurlburt Field, and was originally a Directorate of the 4410th Combat Crew Training Wing. In 1968, the school was re-designated USAFSOS. In June 1987, USAFSOS, as an organizational element of the 23rd Air Force, was assigned to the US Special Operations Command (USSOCOM), headquartered at MacDill AFB, Florida. In May 1990, the school became a direct reporting unit of the newly established Air Force Special Operations Command (AFSOC). In October 2008, with the stand-up of the Air Force Special Operations Training Center, USAFSOS was placed under that unit, which was later reorganized on 11 February 2013 and renamed the Air Force Special Operations Air Warfare Center. Most recently, USAFSOS is aligned to the Air Commando Development Center. During its formative years, the school's main thrust was the preparation of Air Force personnel for duty in Southeast Asia. Subsequently, USAFSOS has grown from teaching a single course the first year, to conducting 140 iterations of 22 different formal courses and 7 customized, Mobile Education Events (MEEs) in AY25. USAFSOS currently provides (SOF) indoctrination, as well as political, military, and cultural studies supporting SOF operations in the various combatant theaters. The school also provides language training, and specialized education on special operations task units and groups, air commando professional leadership development, building partner nation aviation capacity, and integration of Air Force Special Operation Forces (AFSOF) with theater specific assets.

== Personnel and resources ==
USAFSOS is a "de facto" joint school, because of heavy joint/civilian attendance and the joint nature of subjects taught. The staff and faculty have a diverse mix of career fields and expertise and are a range of Air Force officers and enlisted personnel, AF Reserve individual mobilization augmentees, AF civilians and contractors.

== Curriculum ==
The USAFSOS curriculum is directed by the AFSOC Commander to meet USSOCOM validated educational requirements. USAFSOS follows the USAF Instructional Systems Development model for course design and delivery.

Currently, courses are organized in one of four content areas: Irregular Warfare, Regional and Cultural Expertise, Special Operations and Language Training.

1. Irregular Warfare courses educate SOF personnel on a range of adversarial threats and operational and technological countermeasures available for consideration. Irregular Warfare courses include Aviation Foreign Internal Defense, International Terrorism, Force Protection and Interagency.

2. Regional and Cultural Expertise courses are geared to SOF areas of responsibility and trace their roots to the very first course taught at USAFSOS. The purpose of these courses is to educate the SOF warrior to the cultural, historical, political, economic and security issues of a particular region. Regional courses include offering covering Africa, Europe, Asia, Central and South America and the Pacific.

3. Special Operations courses indoctrinate new members of AFSOC and prepare Air Force special operators for global missions. Special operations courses include Special Operations Air Command and Control and Intelligence.

4. The USAFSOS Language Center provides initial acquisition, sustainment and just in time language training across a range of Department of Defense established critical languages.

Several USAFSOS courses utilize expert guest speakers, many at the top of their field, to ensure the most timely and relevant information is provided to the students. Over 700 such guest speakers, including former ambassadors, distinguished academicians, and active duty and retired flag-rank officers, regularly support USAFSOS. USAFSOS meets an increasing demand for "thinking warriors."

== USAFSOS attendance ==
Course offerings are available at several locations worldwide as determined by AFSOC requirements. For some courses, open seats are available on a first-come, first-served basis to members of the Department of Defense and other U.S. Government agencies. Students are responsible for ensuring security clearance requirements are met before attending courses.

There are no tuition charges for U.S. military and government personnel attending USAFSOS courses. The owning unit funds student attendance.
