= 34th Battalion =

34th Battalion may refer to:

== Military units ==
- 34th Battalion (Australia), 1st Australian Imperial Force
- 34th Battalion (New Zealand)
- 34th Battalion, CEF, Canadian Expeditionary Force
- 34 Battalion (SWATF), South West Africa Territorial Force
- HDF 34th Bercsényi László Special Forces Battalion, Hungary
- 34th Battalion Virginia Cavalry

== See also ==
- 34th Brigade (disambiguation)
- 34th Division (disambiguation)
- 34th Regiment (disambiguation)
