= 34th Special Operations Squadron =

34th Special Operations Squadron

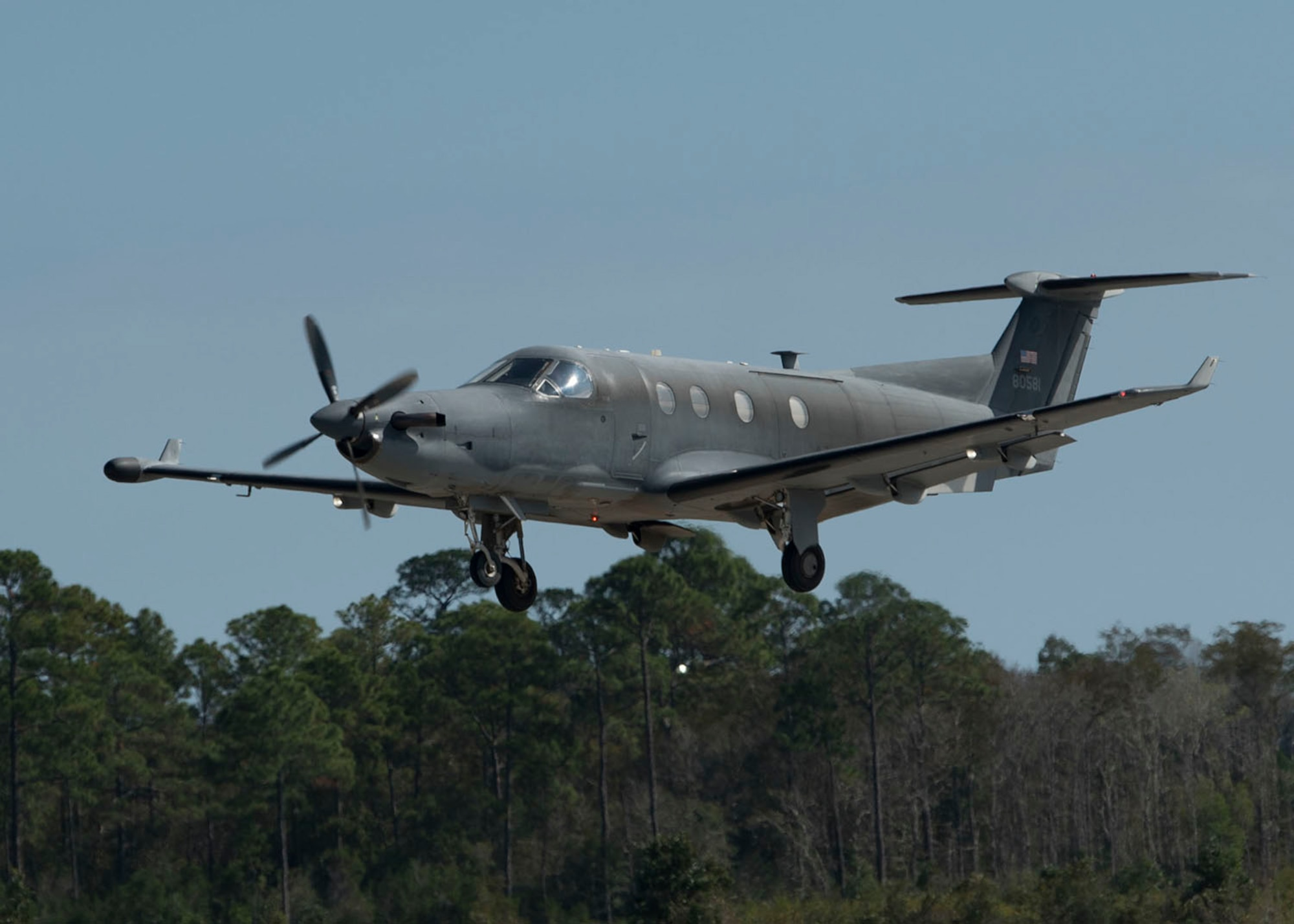
- 34th Special Operations Squadron U-28A Draco
- Active: 1942–1945; 1947–1948; 1952–1955; 2010–present
- Country: United States
- Branch: United States Air Force
- Role: Special Operations
- Part of: Air Force Special Operations Command
- Garrison/HQ: Hurlburt Field
- Engagements: Mediterranean Theater of Operations; Korean War
- Decorations: Distinguished Unit Citation; Republic of Korea Presidential Unit Citation

Insignia
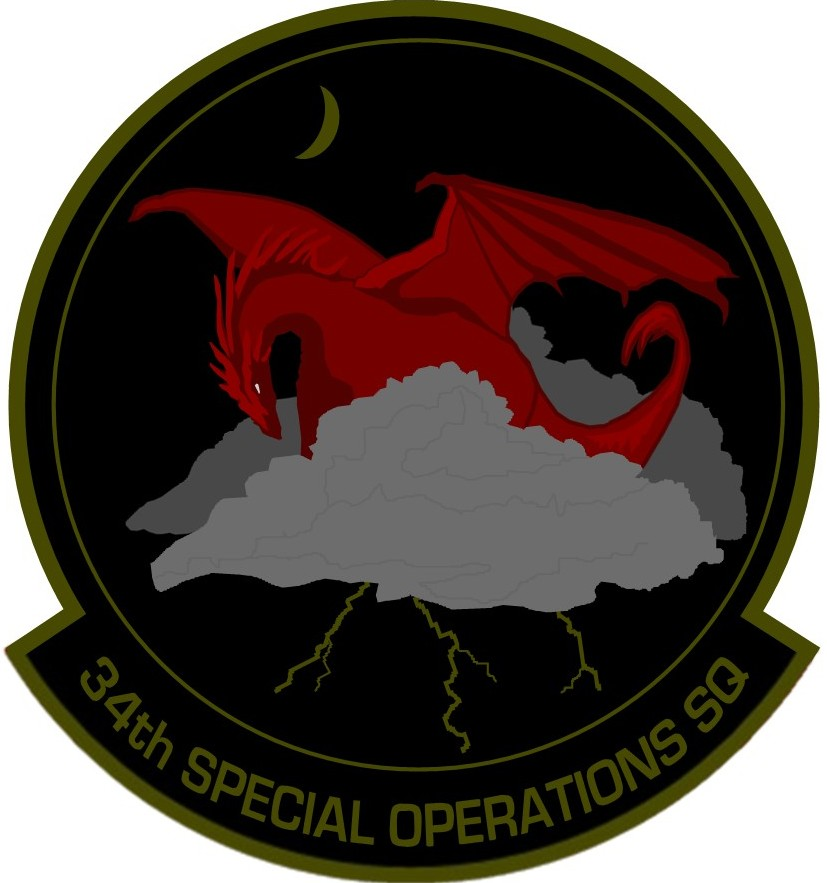
- 34th Special Operations Squadron emblem

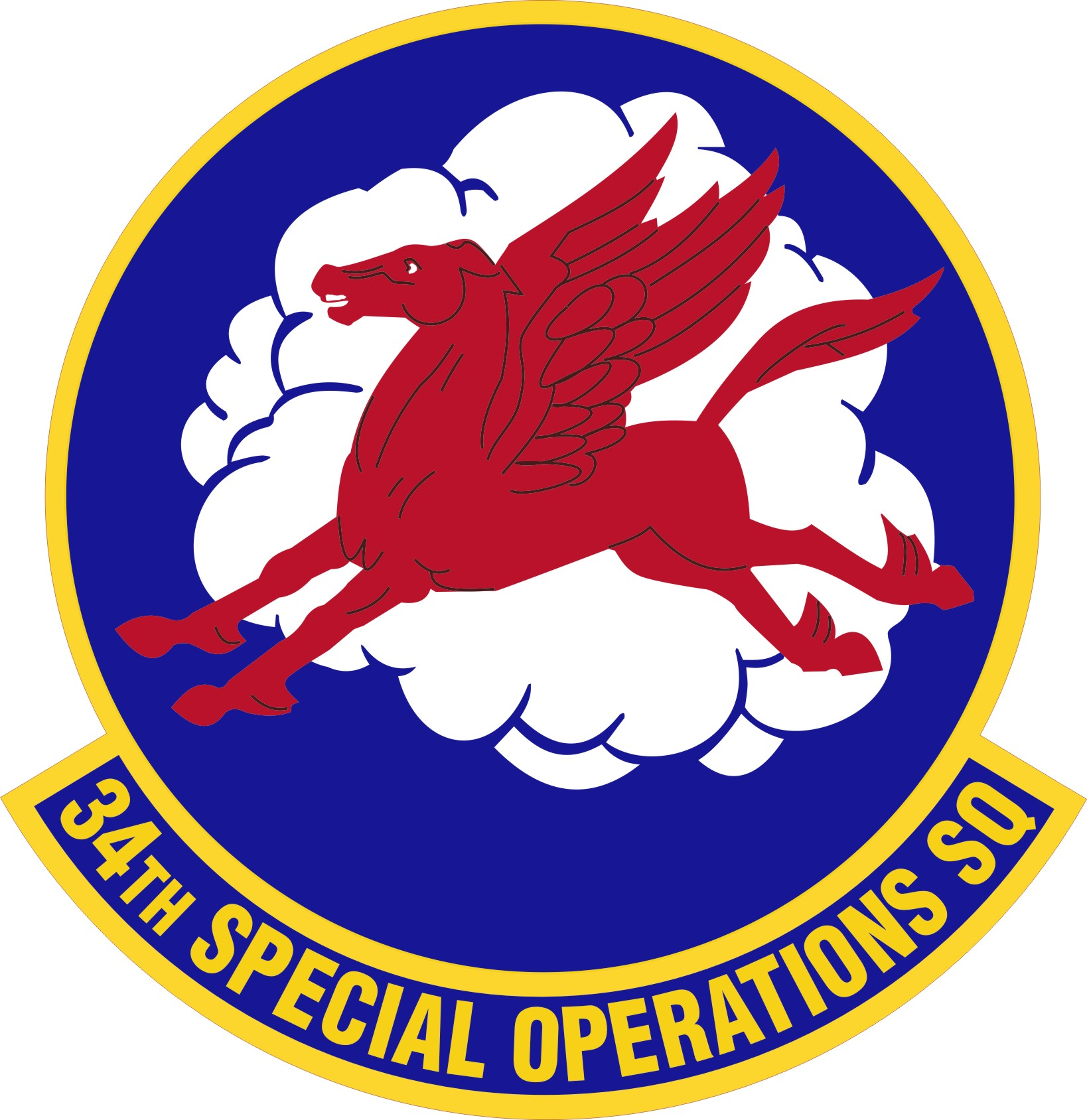
- 34th Special Operations Sq emblem (approved 24 March 1954, modified 24 June 2010)

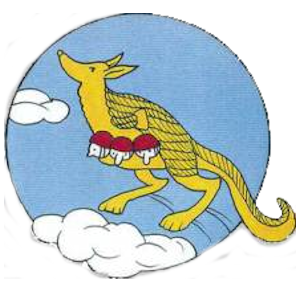
- 34th Troop Carrier Squadron emblem (World War II)

The 34th Special Operations Squadron is an active United States Air Force unit. It is assigned to the 1st Special Operations Group, 1st Special Operations Wing at Hurlburt Field, Florida. It was activated on 9 April 2010.

== History ==
=== World War II ===
Established in early 1942 as a Douglas C-47 Skytrain transport squadron under First Air Force, later trained under I Troop Carrier Command in the eastern United States. Deployed to England in December 1942, being assigned to VIII Air Support Command, Eighth Air Force to provide transport and resupply support to the buildup of the heavy bomber force in England.

Was detached to Twelfth Air Force in Algeria in May 1943 to provide air resupply and transport during the North African Campaign in Algeria and Tunisia. Also performed combat casualty evacuation of wounded personnel to rear areas. Remained under jurisdiction of VIII ASC while in North Africa, providing transport between England and North Africa from its base in Algeria. Returned to England in early 1944 to participate in the buildup of forces prior to the Allied landings in France during D–Day in June 1944.

Engaged in combat operations by dropping paratroops into Normandy on D-Day (6 June 1944) and releasing gliders with reinforcements on the following day. The unit received a Distinguished Unit Citation and a French citation for these missions.

After the Normandy invasion the squadron ferried supplies in the United Kingdom. The squadron also hauled food, clothing, medicine, gasoline, ordnance equipment, and other supplies to the front lines and evacuated patients to rear zone hospitals. It dropped paratroops near Nijmegen and towed gliders carrying reinforcements during the airborne attack on the Netherlands. In December, it participated in the Battle of the Bulge by releasing gliders with supplies for the 101st Airborne Division near Bastogne.

Moved to Belgium in early 1945, and participated in the Western Allied invasion of Germany, participating in the air assault across the Rhine River in March 1945, each aircraft towed two gliders with troops of the 17th Airborne Division and released them near Wesel.

In late May 1945, after V-E Day, the squadron was moved to Waller Field, Trinidad and attached to Air Transport Command. From Trinidad, the squadron ferried returning military personnel to Morrison Field, Florida, where they were sent on to other bases or prepared for separation after the war. Inactivated at the end of July 1945.

=== Tactical Air Command ===
The squadron, along with a number of units, was activated at Langley Field, Virginia in May 1947. It was never assigned personnel or equipment and was inactivated in September 1948.

=== Far East Air Forces ===
Activated by Far East Air Force in 1952 as a combat resupply and transport squadron, based in Japan. Provided aerial transportation between Japan and Korea during the Korean War with Curtiss C-46 Commandos. Inactivated in 1955 in Japan.

=== Special Operations ===
The Squadron was activated at Hurlburt Field, Florida in April 2010 and equipped for special operations missions.

=== Operations and decorations ===
- Combat Operations. Included airborne assaults on Normandy, the Netherlands, and Germany, as well as aerial transportation in ETO and MTO, during World War II. Apparently not manned, 1947–1948. Aerial transportation between Japan and Korea during Korean War.
- Campaigns. World War II: Sicily; Naples-Foggia; Rome-Arno; Normandy, Northern France; Rhineland; Central Europe. Korean War: Korea Summer-Fall, 1952, Third Korean Winter; Korea Summer-Fall, 1953.
- Decorations. Distinguished Unit Citation: France, [6] Jun 1944. Republic of Korea Presidential Unit Citation: [10 Jun 1952]-27 Jul 1953.

== Lineage ==
- Constituted as the 34th Transport Squadron on 2 February 1942

Activated on 14 February 1942
Redesignated 34th Troop Carrier Squadron on 4 July 1942
Inactivated on 31 July 1945

- Activated on 19 May 1947

Inactivated on 10 September 1948

- Redesignated 34th Troop Carrier Squadron, Medium on 23 May 1952

Activated on 10 June 1952
Inactivated on 18 January 1955

- Redesignated 34th Special Operations Squadron on 26 February 2010

Activated on 9 April 2010

=== Assignments ===
- 315th Transport Group (later 315th Troop Carrier Group), 14 February 1942 – 31 July 1945
- 315th Troop Carrier Group, 19 May 1947 – 10 September 1948
- 315th Troop Carrier Group, 10 June 1952 – 18 January 1955
- 1st Special Operations Group, 9 April 2010 – present

=== Stations ===
- Olmsted Field, Pennsylvania, 14 February 1942
- Bowman Field, Kentucky, 17 June 1942
- Florence Army Air Field, South Carolina, 4 August-11 October 1942
- RAF Aldermaston (AAF-467), England, 1 December 1942 (operated from Blida Airfield, Algeria, 29 May 1943 – 7 March 1944)
- RAF Welford (AAF-474), England, 6 November 1943
- RAF Spanhoe (AAF-493), England, 6 February 1944
- Amiens Airfield (B-48), France, 6 April–May 1945
- Waller Field, Trinidad, May-31 July 1945
- Langley Field, Virginia 19 May 1947 – 10 September 1948
- Brady Air Base, Japan, 20 June 1952 – 18 January 1955
- Eglin Air Force Base, Florida, 9 April 2010 – present

=== Aircraft ===
- Douglas C-47 Skytrain, 1942–1945
- Curtiss C-46 Commando, 1952–1955
- Pilatus U-28A Draco, 2010–present
