= 34 Battalion (SWATF) =

34 Battalion/202 Battalion
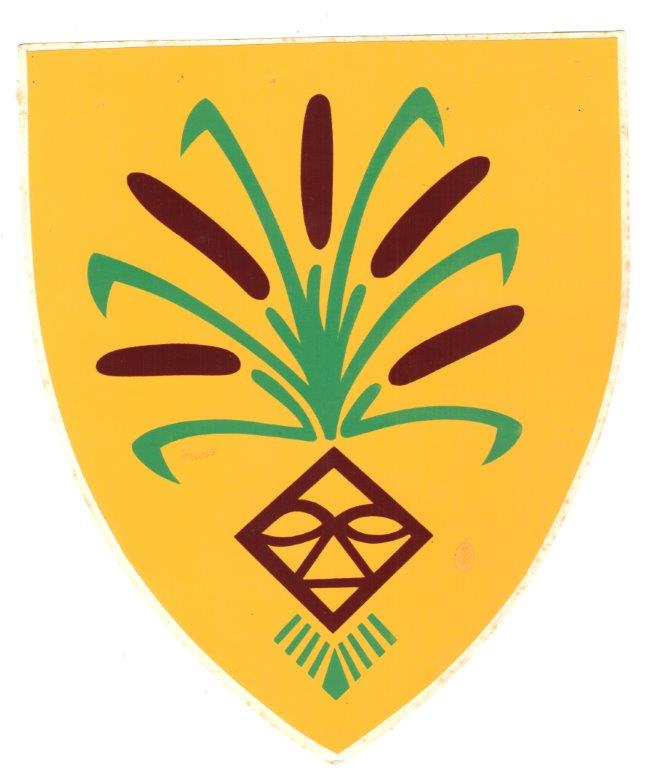
- SWATF 34 Battalion emblem
- Disbanded: 1990–91
- Country: Namibia, South Africa
- Allegiance: South Africa
- Branch: South African Army,
- Type: Light Infantry
- Part of: South West African Territorial Force
- Garrison/HQ: Rundu (17°57′55″S 19°43′56″E)
- Nickname: Kavangoland Battalion

Commanders
- Last Commanding Officer: Commandant Van Der Merwe
- Last 2nd in Command: Major Zeeman
- Last RSM: WO1 F.J.S. Sheepers

Insignia
- Part of the South West African Territorial Force

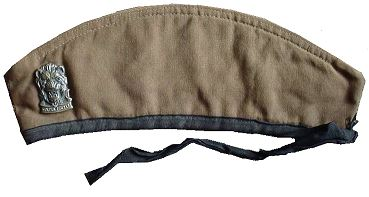
- SWATF Reaction Force bonnie cap

34 Battalion was a light infantry battalion that was part of the SWATF.

== History ==
34 Battalion was commonly known as the "Kavangoland Battalion". It was established in 1975 as 1 Kavango Battalion as a ceremonial guard of honour. It was then renamed 34 Battalion .

=== Operational Area ===
34 Battalions main base was at Rundu, but there was an outside base at Mashari, approx 60 kilometres (37 mi) east of Rundu, where Charlie and Delta companies were routinely stationed. The Mashari base was in an old TB hospital. They were co-located with a BRUSH unit.(Bush Reconnaissance Unit Signal HQ)

As part of Sector 20, their main area of responsibility was from Rundu West as far as Sector 10 and East up to the Bagani bridge.

=== Personnel ===
Initially 34 Battalion was manned primarily with Kavango troops but later with a large number of turned SWAPO Cadres. The first Kavango instructors were trained in 1979. The first Kavango officer was commissioned in 1980 and the first group of sergeants were promoted that same year.

=== Structure ===
34 Battalion generally consisted of:

- a HQ,
- a Support Company,
- 4 Line Companies (Buffel APC),
- and an Armoured Reconnaissance wing of 2 Platoons and 4 Eland 90s.

There was usually also an attached SA Army Infantry Company. 34 Battalion's role was primarily that of light infantry, with some mounted (berede) troops and a Romeo Mike team (Afrikaans Reaksie Mag).

=== Engagements ===
The unit had its first skirmish in 1979. Thereafter they took part in most of the major operations in the operational area. They were credited with completely suppressing all insurgency activities in the Kavango region by 1987.

=== Renaming ===
The South West Africa Territory Force SWATF renumbered battalion numbers according to their geographical positioning on the border. The prefix 10 pertained to battalions operating to the west of the Kavango River, 20 to the Kavango or central region and 70 to the eastern region. Under this system, 34 Battalion was renamed 202 Battalion in 1980.

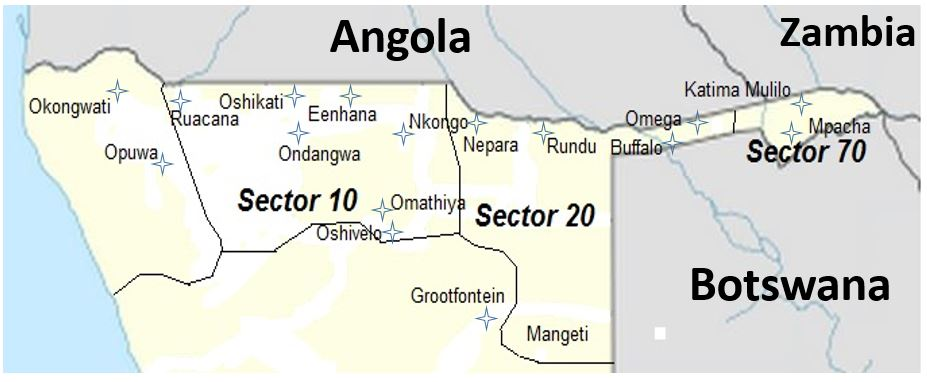
SWATF Northern Sector Map

=== Officers Commanding ===
- Captain Paul Swanepoel 1978
- Commandant Charlie Hochapfel 1978-1981
- Commandant J.M.A. Swanepoel 1982-1983
- Commandant Manie van Rensburg 1984 (acting)
- Commandant J.R. Liebenberg 1984-1987
- Commandant Pieter van der Merwe 1988-1989

== Choir ==
The unit's choir was formed in 1985. They won their section of the Roodepoort Eisteddford 1987.

The choir's main exposure to the public occurred when they took part in the Kavango song festival. They won acclaim at the 1996 song festival at the University of Stellenbosch and were invited to perform for the State President at his Cape Town residence. They also had a combined tour with the Drakensberg Boys' Choir. Lt Col Zeeman, who facilitated the DBCS tour, later went on to become the Chairman of the Board of DBCS Board of Governors.

== Roll of Honour ==
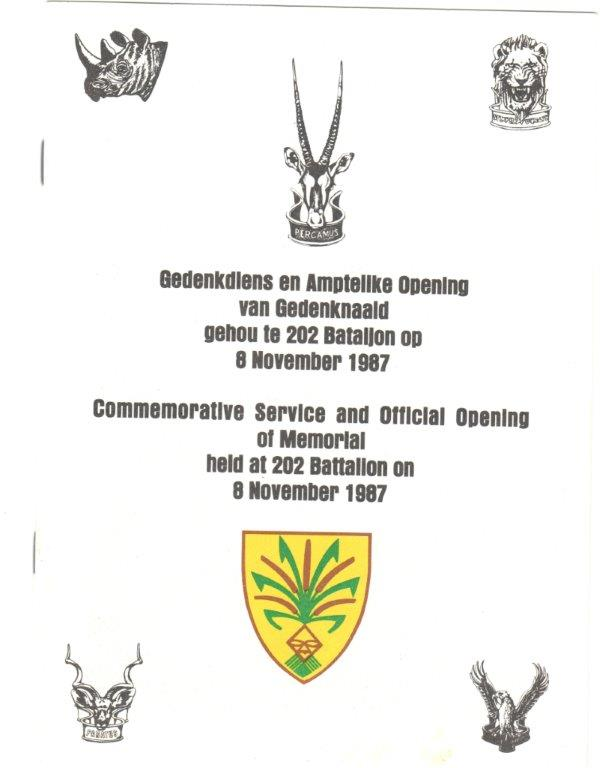
Commemorative Service and Official Opening of Memorial held at 202 Battalion 8 November 1987

- 1977: Jones, A., Cpl
- 1983: Kambathi, L.K., Rfn
- 1983: Kamunoko, I.S., Cpl
- 1980: Karupu, G., Rfn
- 1981: Katanga, P., Rfn
- 1982: Kudumo, L., Rfn
- 1982: Kudumo, A.H., Rfn
- 1983: Kufuna, R.R., Rfn
- 1977: Makehe, M., Sktr
- 1983: Matamu, M., Rfn
- 1981: Mukoya, R., Rfn
- 1983: Mukusho, B., Sgt
- 1983: Mukwambi, T.K., Rfn
- 1982: Murongo, G., Rfn
- 1983: Mushambe, A., Rfn
- 1982: Mushanambango, F., Rfn
- 1983: Muyevu, J., Rfn
- 1983: Muyota, V., Rfn
- 1980: Nyundu, F., Rfn (Note: This person is marked on the Fort Klapperkop Memorial wall with an * as having died during operations or in combat.)
- 1983: Shikusho, F., Rfn
- 1982: Shimbaranda, S., Rfn
- 1983: Sikwaya, T., Rfn
- 1983: Sindere, L., Rfn
- 1983: Tobias, V., Rfn
- 1983: Visser, J.E., 2Lt
