= 34th Division (Yugoslav Partisans) =

Yugoslav Partisan military division formed in 1944

34th Croatia Division
- Flag of Democratic Federal Yugoslavia (used by the Partisans)
- Active: 1944–1945
- Country: Democratic Federal Yugoslavia
- Branch: Yugoslav Partisan Army
- Type: Infantry
- Size: 3,363 (upon formation)
- Engagements: World War II in Yugoslavia

Commanders
- Notable commanders: Josip Antolović

The 34th Croatia Division (Serbo-Croatian Latin: Tridesetčetvrta hrvatska divizija) was a Yugoslav Partisan division formed on 30 January 1944 on Žumberak mountains. It was formed from the 16th Youth Brigade and Franjo Ogulinac Seljo Brigade which had a total of 3,363 fighters. The division was part of the 4th Corps and it operated in Žumberak, Pokuplje, Turopolje and the northern parts of Kordun i Banija.
