= Rule 34 (disambiguation) =

Rule 34 is an Internet meme that states "If it exists, there is porn of it. No exceptions."

Rule 34 may also refer to:

- Rule 34 (film), 2022, directed by Julia Murat
- Rule 34 (novel), 2011, by Charles Stross
- "Rule 34", a 2014 episode of comedy television series Garfunkel and Oates
- Rule 34 of the Federal Rules of Civil Procedure, which governs requests for production of documents
- Rule 34, the Wolfram code for a particular elementary cellular automaton

== See also ==
- The 34th Rule, a 1999 Star Trek: Deep Space Nine novel
