= Pilatus U-28 Draco =

US military surveillance aircraft

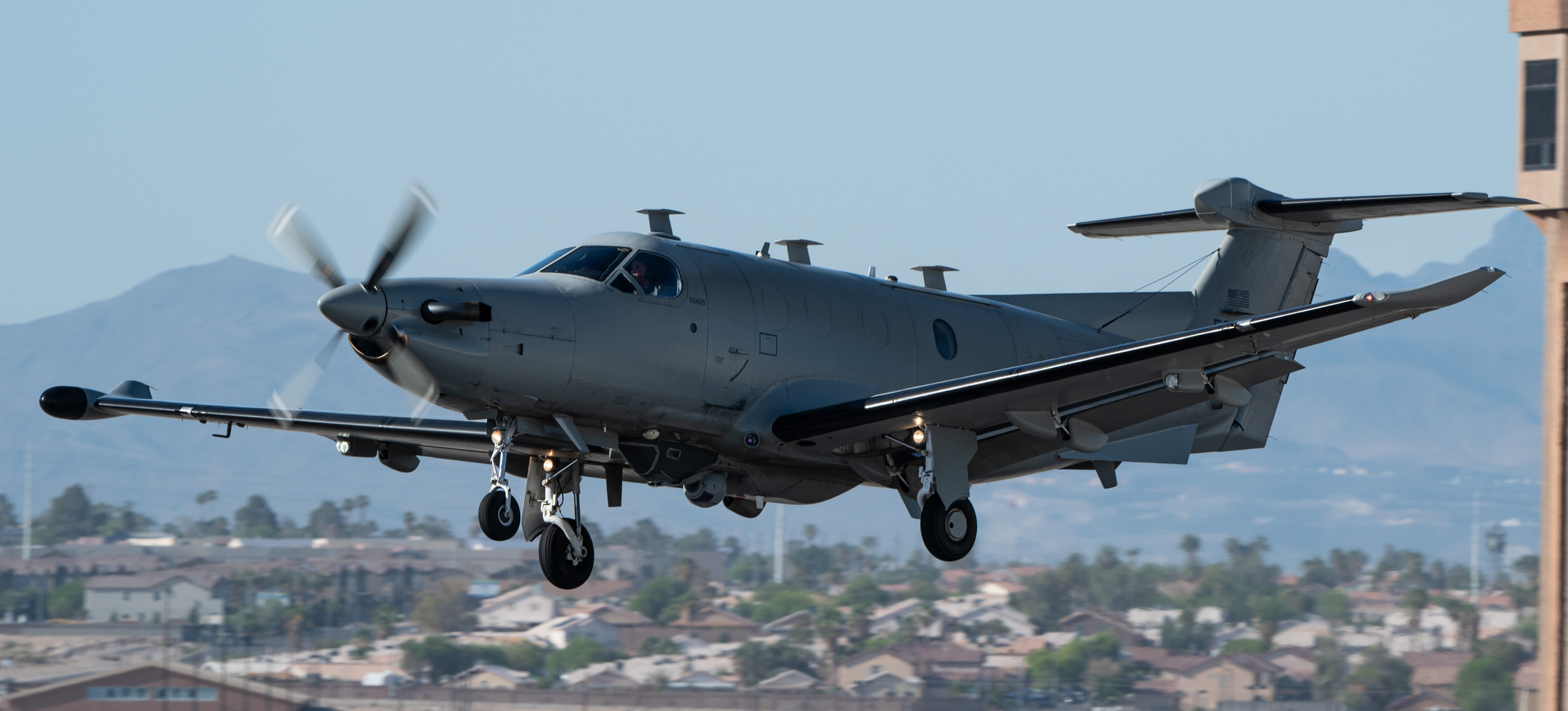
- A U-28A Draco taking off from Nellis AFB on 29 May 2024.

General information
- Role: Special operations, tactical ISR, Forward Air Control, counter-insurgency.
- Manufacturer: Pilatus Aircraft (base aircraft), Sierra Nevada Corporation (militarization)
- Issued by: United States Special Operations Command
- Service: Air Force Special Operations Command
- Number built: 30+, 28 in service as of January 2025

History
- Introduction date: 2006
- Developed from: Pilatus PC-12

The Pilatus-SNC U-28A Draco is an American special operations, tactical intelligence, surveillance and reconnaissance (ISR), forward air control, and counter insurgency aircraft operated by Air Force Special Operations Command (AFSOC). It is a version of the single-engine turboprop Pilatus PC-12 modified by the Sierra Nevada Corporation which was first acquired by SOCOM in October 2005 to provide support for special operations forces.

Dedicated sensors and communication equipment allow it to provide real time full-motion video to ground forces and serve as their "eyes in the sky". These surveillance and communications capabilities also make it a valuable Tactical Air Coordinator-Airborne (TAC(A)) aircraft, coordinating Close Air support efforts from other aircraft in a "stack" ; when performing this mission the aircraft take the callsign Warden. The U-28 has also been used to hunt high-value terrorist targets, taking part in the "Find, Fix, Finish" kill chain. Being based on the rugged PC-12, the U-28 can operate with limited infrastructure and personnel, from austere semi-prepared airfields and remote locations.

== Operational history ==
=== Induction into service ===
In 2005, USSOCOM selected the Pilatus PC-12 to fulfill its need for a commercially available airplane, capable of operating from short, unpaved and remote airstrips. Publicly, their mission was called intra-theater support, the aircraft were advertised as being crewed by one or two pilots and an optional navigator, serving as transport aircraft. The U-28A's true mission however is to serve as a tactical airborne ISR asset for Special Operations Forces. For this role, aircraft are equipped with additional sensors and fly with two pilots and additional crew members, such as Combat Systems Officers (CSO), Tactical Systems Operators and intelligence specialists. While most aircraft are painted in military colors, some bear civilian paint schemes in an effort to disguise the aircraft for covert and clandestine operations.

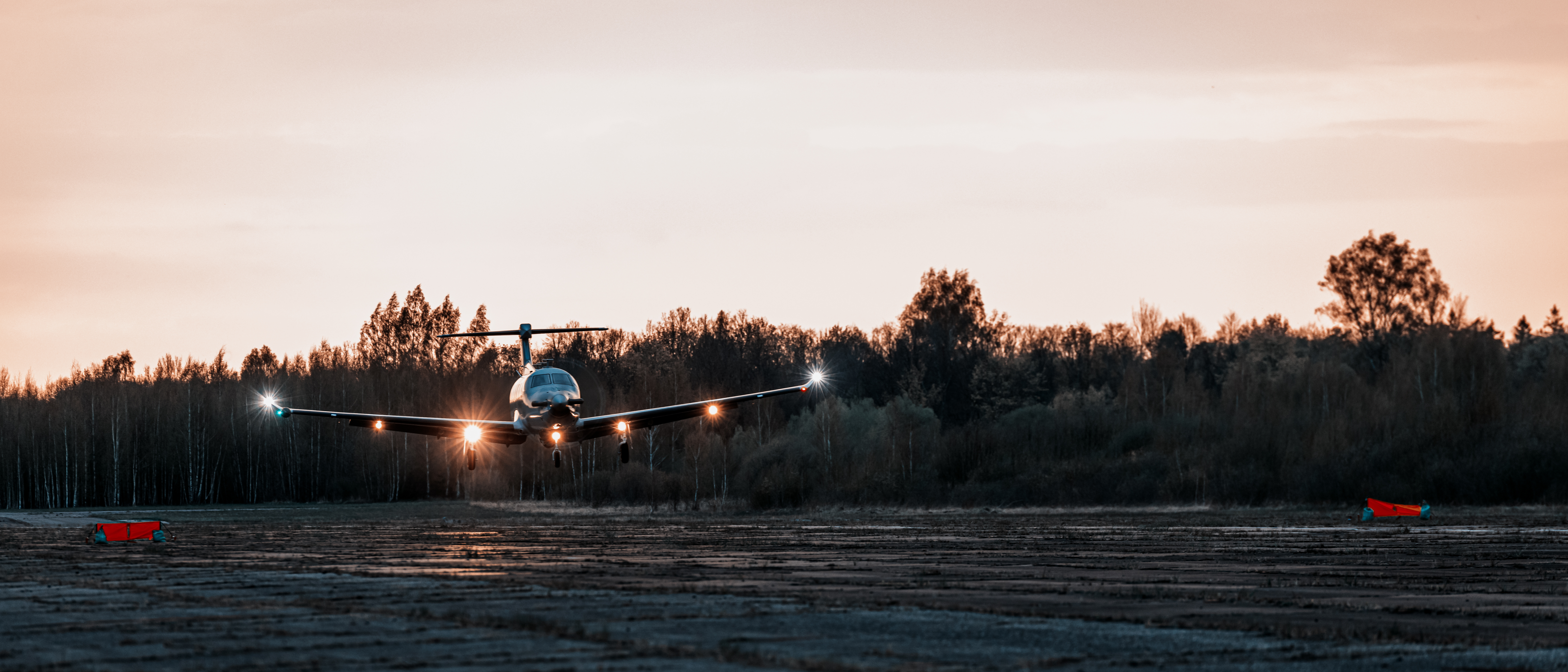
U-28 landing on an unpaved runway.

The requirement for this capability was emitted by SOCOM for use in operations Enduring Freedom and Iraqi Freedom. The initial Pilatus PC-12 were purchased with SOCOM funds, these initial airframes were sourced from the private second-hand market then modified by the Sierra Nevada Corporation (SNC). The U-28 are owned by SOCOM but operated by AFSOC, as part of its Non-standard Aviation (NSAv) fleet, now known as light tactical fixed wing fleet.

AFSOC has also operated standard Pilatus PC-12s, both for training U-28 crews, but also as transport aircraft, in this role the PC-12 was used as light transport aircraft, ferrying small amounts of people and cargo to remote or austere airfield, this mission is called "SOF mobility". This leads to confusion, given that the aircraft are visually very similar and often operated by the same squadrons.

The first U-28 squadron, the 319th Special Operations Squadron, was activated on 1 October 2005 at Hurlburt Field, Florida, and started flying the aircraft in early 2006. The aircraft first deployed to combat in June 2006.

=== Theaters of operation ===
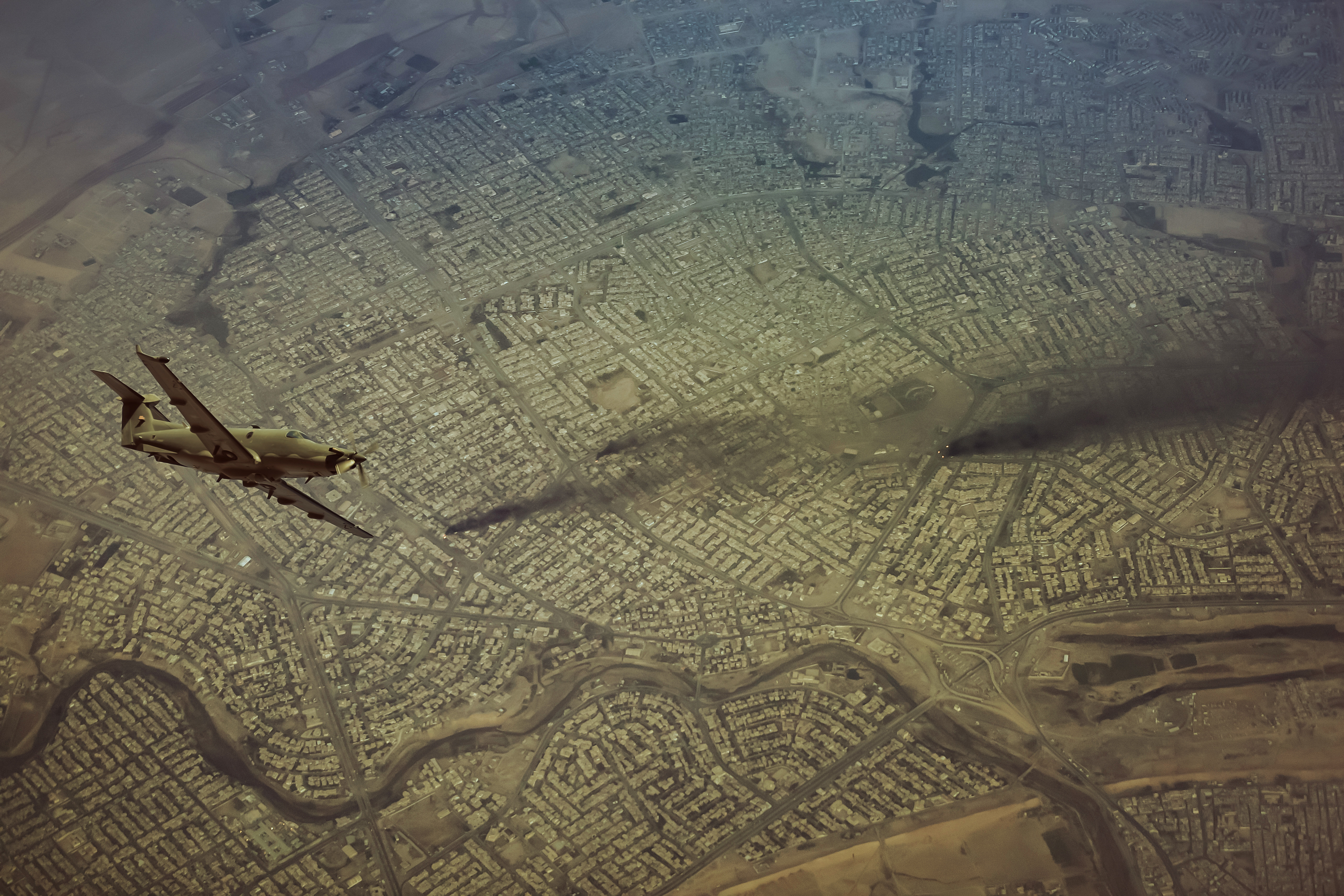
A U-28A flying over Mosul, Iraq on 24 November 2016.

The U-28 have operated worldwide, most prominently in the Middle East and Africa but also in Europe and the Pacific region. They were first deployed to Afghanistan and Iraq during operations Enduring Freedom and Iraqi Freedom. Aircraft have also reportedly operated in or from Niger, Djibouti, the Arabian Peninsula, Somalia, Mali, Uganda, South Sudan, Ethiopia, Burkina Faso, Syria, the Philippines, and the United Kingdom.

=== Accidents and losses ===
- U-28A tail number 07-0736 from the 34th Special Operations Squadron crashed on 18 February 2012 at approximately 19:18 five miles southwest of Camp Lemonier, Djibouti, from which it was operating. The aircraft was destroyed and all four aircrew members died. The cause of the crash was found to be spatial disorientation.
- U-28A tail number 08-0724 from the 318th Special Operations Squadron crashed on 14 March 2017 at approximately 6:50pm about a quarter of a mile east of Clovis Municipal Airport, New Mexico. All three crew members were killed (two pilots and one CSO). An accident investigation board report found crew error to be responsible; the aircraft stalled at low altitude as they were practicing turnback emergency landing pattern procedures.

=== Naming ===
On 19 June 2019, AFSOC announced that the U-28 would receive the popular name Draco, Latin for Dragon and a northern constellation. The plane did not have a popular name until that point. The name Draco was already associated with the U-28 since its first deployment in 2006.

=== Fall of Kabul ===
A detachment of U-28s were stationed at Kabul international airport in August 2021, during the Fall of Kabul. They participated in Operation Allies Refuge, the effort to evacuate 124,000 people from the country. They provided continuous ISR support to the ground forces; as one U-28 landed, another would take off to take its place. The aircraft informed coalition forces on the ground of perimeter breaches, crowd movements and approaching Taliban forces.

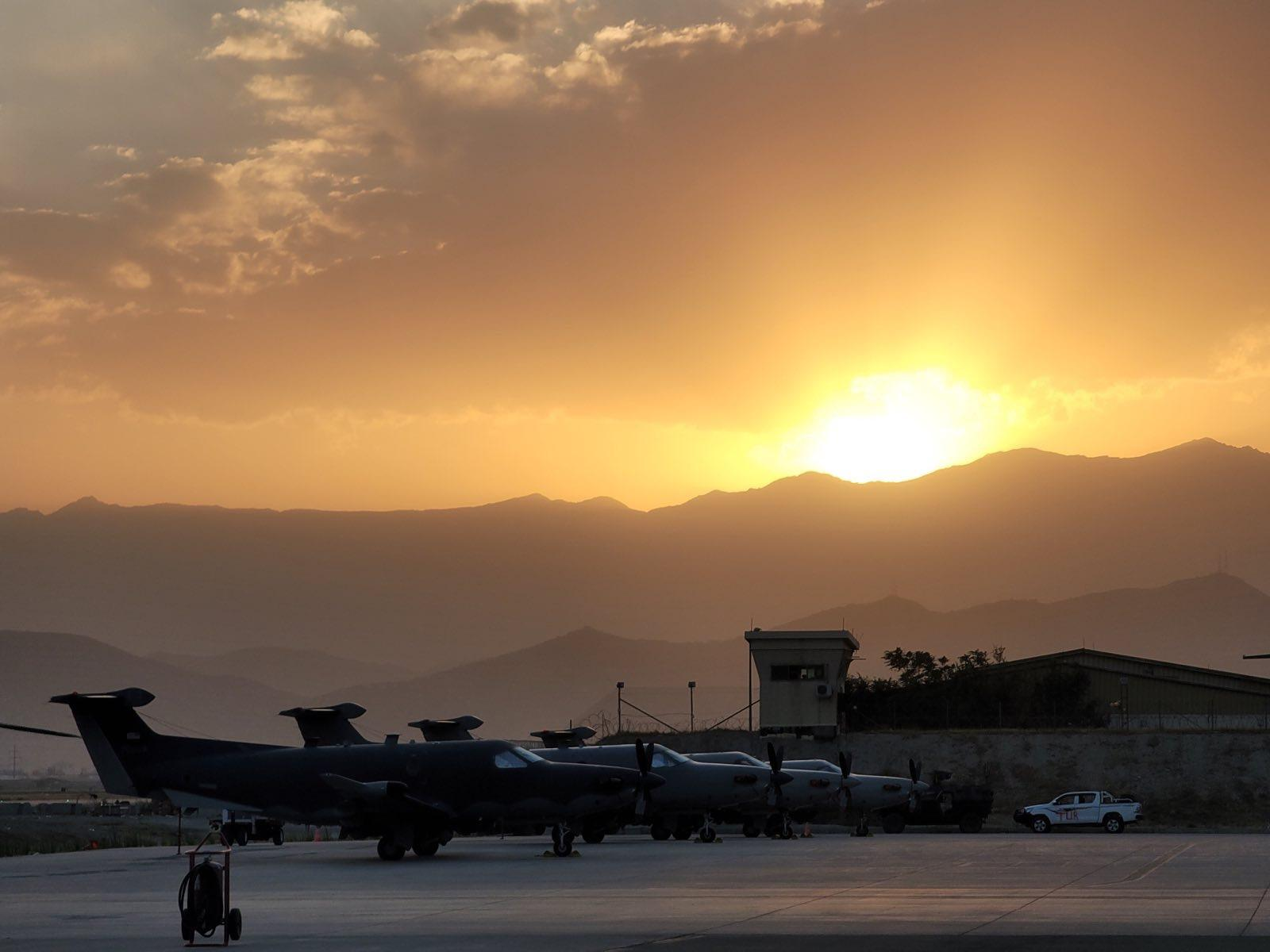
4 U-28A Dracos parked at Kabul International Airport in August 2021.

On August 15 and 16, as the airport fell and chaos broke out, the U-28s continued flight operation. On several occasions aircraft came under fire from small arms, rockets and anti aircraft artillery (AAA) forcing the aircraft to perform evasive maneuvers. One aircraft, "Draco 42", having stayed airborne beyond bingo fuel and into the night was running critically low on fuel, and its pilot, Lt. Col. Samuel McIntyre, had to land in a "gap in the crowd" which covered the runway by that point. The next day, another crew also nearly ran out of fuel and was about to land on a crowded taxiway, before making a last-second correction onto the runway where a gap had opened up. As they were attempting to taxi back, they had to stop and shut down the engine as civilians swarmed the aircraft, the crew barricaded themselves inside and waited for help from security forces. An AH-64 Apache helicopter was able to disperse the crowd by hovering low above it, at which point the crew took their weapons and left the aircraft to escape on foot to a nearby hangar. The aircraft commander, Lt. Col. Scott Hardman, received the Aviator Valor Award in recognition of "his exemplary actions leading his team to safety".

On 17 November 2023, a total of ten Draco crew members were awarded Distinguished Flying Crosses for their actions in Kabul, a first for the U-28 community.

=== Replacement ===
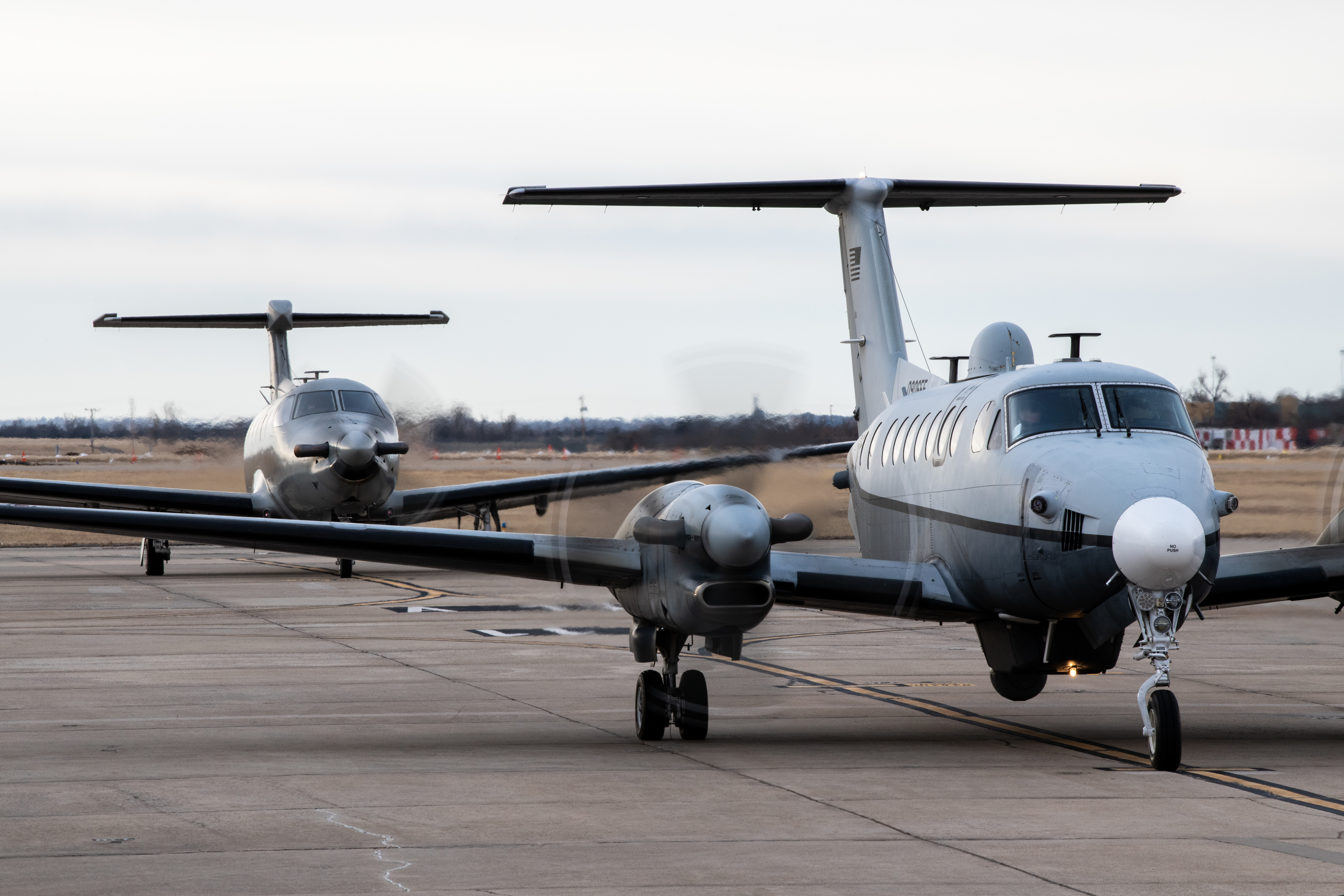
An MC-12W Liberty and a U-28A Draco seen preparing for take off together.

In 2013, the highly tasked U-28s began to require a 20,000 flight hour inspection costing $595,000 per aircraft, with a further $1.14 million inspection required at 35,000 hours expected for 2017. To avoid these costs, and other expenses required to upgrade sensors, communications and data-sharing equipment, AFSOC planned to replace them all with the MC-12W Liberty, which had been used by Air Combat Command. However that plan was cancelled after pushback from Congress. Instead, AFSOC modified additional PC-12 airframes from its inventory into the U-28 configuration.

The OA-1K Skyraider II being fielded through the 2020s coincides with the divestment of the U-28. It is not a direct replacement for the U-28, but it does include ISR capability and is expected to carry out the U-28's mission, at least partially. Some personnel from the U-28 will be converting to the OA-1K. SOCOM's plan to divest the U-28 and MC-12W has come under criticism from the Government Accountability Office (GAO), which, in a 2024 report warns of a gap in ISR capability left by the prospective retirement of the U-28, the fear being that the OA-1K may not be able to cover these gaps, it had not achieved sufficient ability in August 2023. In May 2024, SOCOM officials announced plans for a more direct replacement for the U-28 and MC-12W manned-ISR aircraft, however it was revealed in June 2026 that any plans for a direct manned ISR replacement had been cancelled. This also comes amongst concern that AFSOC's fleet of turboprop aircraft (such as the U-28) will be survivable enough to prove useful in a war against a peer adversary, rather than the asymmetric conflicts of the Global War On Terror, where these aircraft could operate in relative impunity.

== Variants ==
All aircraft are designated U-28A but various configuration exist. For example, not all aircraft feature the distinctive underbelly sensors; the propeller can have four or five blades; different numbers of antennas and more. Below is a list of publicly known variants:

U-28A EQ

U-28A EQ+ : Model updated from EQ. Features a new sensor turret with high definition, multi-spectral imaging, full-motion video camera, offering better range from previous sensors. As well as Enhanced Ground Proximity Warning to prevent flight into terrain accidents, updated BLOS SATCOM, and navigation modifications to enable operation in GPS-denied environments. At least two U-28 EQ aircraft converted to EQ+. AFSOC plans to upgrade the entire fleet to the EQ+ standard.

== Specifications (U-28A) ==
=== General characteristics ===
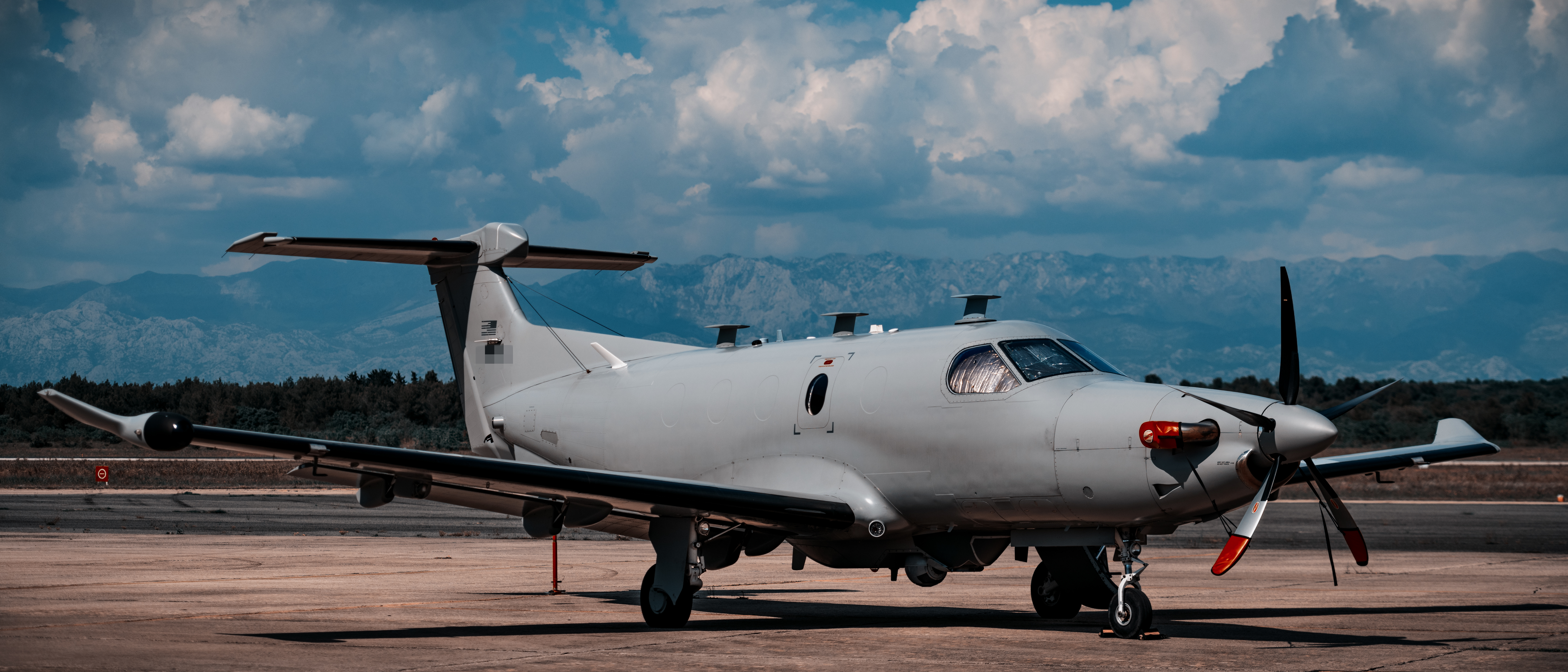
U-28A Draco parked on the flight line.

Data from the Air Force Factsheet.

- Crew : 2 Pilots, 1 Combat Systems Officer (CSO), 1 Tactical Systems Operator (TSO)
- Engine : 1 Pratt-Whitney PT6A-67B turboprop producing 1200 hp
- Wingspan : 16.23 meters
- Length : 14.4 meters
- Height : 4.25 meters
- Range : 1500 nautical miles
- MTOW : 10,935 pounds
- Unit cost : $16.5 million

=== Crew ===
Specified crew varies depending on the mission carried out on any given sortie. The minimum crew is one pilot. In the first years of service, the aircraft was reportedly crewed by two pilots and an optional navigator, this may have been deceptive reporting to hide the aircraft's true purpose. The air force fact sheet lists a crew of four, including Two pilots, one Combat Systems Officer, one Tactical Systems Operator (TSO). In August 2021 over Kabul, some of the aircraft flew with two pilots (an aircraft commander and a mission pilot) and an enlisted TSO, while others also included a CSO and an intelligence specialist.

=== Mission equipment ===
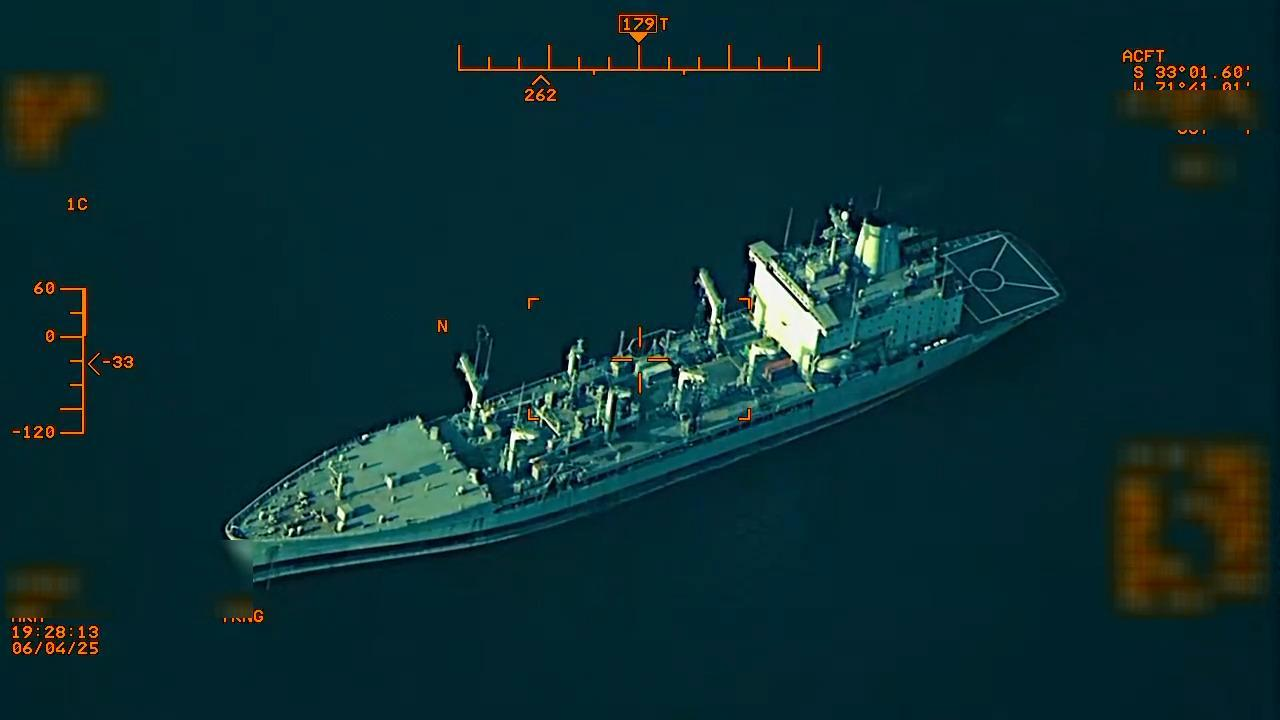
A Chilean Navy ship viewed from a U-28's EO/IR sensor.

The equipment on board the aircraft varies heavily from one aircraft to the next, and over time. The equipment featured is secretive, sometimes Top Secret.

Aircraft are modified to have EO/IR sensor turrets, a SIGINT suite to geo-locate and monitor enemy communications. Some aircraft may also have a Synthetic Aperture Radar. A secure communications suite allows the aircraft to relay the information it collects to forces on the ground, or to command centers, this includes 13 radios for UHF, VHF, Satcom and VoIP audio communications and the ability to broadcast full motion video from the EO/IR turrets in real-time over the L, S, C and Ka/Ku bands. Data can be communicated through Link 16, SADL (Situational Awareness Datalink), HPW (High Performance Waveform satcom), ANW2 (Adaptive Networking Wideband Waveform), MANET (mobile ad hoc network), MIRC (Microsoft Internet Relay Chat) and VORTEX (video oriented transceiver for exchange). Advanced navigation equipment is also featured, all aircraft appear to retain the weather radar found on the PC-12. Lastly the aircraft are equipped with survivability equipment, AN/AAR-47 Missile Approach Warning System sensors can be seen on the front wing-root and on the tail, these warn the crew of incoming threats such as MANPADS.

Electro-Optical and Infrared Imaging (EO/IR) sensor turrets are present : a Multi-Spectral Targeting System is located in the tail of the aircraft, originaly an AN/AAS-52 MTS-A later upgraded to AN/DAS-1 MTS-B, it folds in and out of the fuselage, the same arrangement is found on the commercially available Pilatus PC-12M surveillance aircraft. The other EO/IR turret is an Wescam MX-15, it is not seen on all airframes but is mounted on the underbelly on the aircraft as part of a larger underbelly gondola. These are often the primary sensors, they allow the crew to find and surveil persons and things of interests (such as friendly or enemy forces).

== Operators ==
- United States
  - United States Air Force
    - Air Force Special Operations Command
      - 34th Special Operations Squadron, 9 April 2010 - today
      - 310th Special Operations Squadron, 30 April 2021 - today
      - 318th Special Operations Squadron, 2016 - today. Activated to fly PC-12 in the transport role on 16 May 2008, finished transition to U-28A in September 2016.
      - 319th Special Operations Squadron, early 2006 - today
      - 19th Special Operations Squadron, Formal Training Unit (FTU).
    - Air Force Reserve Command
      - 5th Special Operations Squadron, late 2007 - today. Formal Training Unit (FTU).

== See also ==
=== Aircraft of similar roles ===
- L-3 Communications MC-12W Liberty
- L3Harris OA-1K Skyraider II
- General Atomics MQ-1 Predator
- General Atomics MQ-9 Reaper
