= 34th Division =

34th Division or 34th Infantry Division may refer to:

== Infantry divisions ==
- 34th Division (German Empire)
- 34th Infantry Division (Wehrmacht), Germany
- 34th SS Volunteer Grenadier Division Landstorm Nederland, Germany
- 34th Infantry Division (India), British Indian Army
- 34th Division (Imperial Japanese Army)
- 34th Light Infantry Division, Pakistan
- 34th Infantry Division (Russian Empire)
- 34th Guards Motor Rifle Division, Soviet Union, earlier the 34th Guards Mechanized Division
- 34th Guards Rifle Division, Soviet Union
- 34th Motor Rifle Division, Soviet Union
- 34th Rifle Division, Soviet Union
- 34th Division (United Kingdom)
- 34th Infantry Division (United States)
- 34th Division (Yugoslav Partisans)

== Armoured divisions ==
- 34th Tank Division, Soviet Union

== Artillery divisions ==
- 34th Guards Artillery Division, Soviet Union and Russia

== Aviation divisions ==
- 34th Transport Aviation Division, People's Liberation Army Air Force
- 34th Air Division, United States

== See also ==
- List of military divisions by number
- 34th Army (disambiguation)
- XXXIV Corps (disambiguation)
- 34th Brigade (disambiguation)
- 34th Regiment (disambiguation)
- 34th Battalion (disambiguation)
- 34th Squadron (disambiguation)
