= 3/4 =

3/4 or 3/4 or ¾ may refer to:

- The fraction three quarters (3/4) equal to 0.75

== Arts and media ==
- 3/4 (film), a 2017 Bulgarian film
- 3/4 time, a form of triple metre in music
- 3/4 profile, in portraits
- 3/4 perspective, in video games
- 3/4 (single album), a single album by South Korean band Onewe

== Other uses ==
- 3/4″ videocassette, better known as the U-matic format
- March 4 (month-day date notation)
- 3 April (day-month date notation)
- 3rd Battalion 4th Marines, a unit in the United States Marine Corps
- Three fourths, alternative name for Capri pants
