= 34 Squadron =

34 Squadron or 34th Squadron may refer to:

== Aviation squadrons ==
- No. 34 Squadron RAAF, a unit of the Royal Australian Air Force
- No. 34 Squadron RAF, a unit of the United Kingdom Royal Air Force
- No. 34 Squadron (Finland), a unit of the Finnish Air Force
- 34th Bomb Squadron, a unit of the United States Air Force
- 34th Fighter Squadron, a unit of the United States Air Force
- 34th Helicopter Squadron, a unit of the Yugoslav Air Force
- 34th Pursuit Squadron, a unit of the former United States Army Air Force
- 34th Special Operations Squadron, a unit of the United States Air Force
- 34th Troop Carrier Squadron, a unit of the United States Air Force
- VFA-34 (Strike Fighter Squadron 34), a unit of the United States Navy

== Other squadrons ==
- No. 34 Squadron RAF Regiment, a unit of the United Kingdom Royal Air Force
- 34th Combat Communications Squadron, a unit of the United States Air Force

== See also ==
- 34th Division (disambiguation)
- 34th Brigade (disambiguation)
- 34th Regiment (disambiguation)
