= 34th Brigade =

34th Brigade or 34th Infantry Brigade may refer to:

== Australia ==
- 34th Brigade (Australia), a unit of the Australian Army

== Canada ==
- 34 Canadian Brigade Group, a unit of the Canadian Army

== Greece ==
- 34th Mechanized Infantry Brigade (Greece), a unit of the Greek Army

== India ==
- 34th Indian Brigade of the British Indian Army in the First World War
- 34th Indian States Forces Infantry Brigade of the British Indian Army in the Second World War

== Romania ==
- 34th Infantry Brigade (Romania), a unit of the Romanian Army

== Russia ==
- 34th Separate Guards Mountain Motor Rifle Brigade, a unit of the Russian Army

== Ukraine ==
- 34th Marine Brigade (Ukraine)

== United Kingdom ==
- 34th (South Midland) Anti-Aircraft Brigade
- 34th Armoured Brigade (United Kingdom)
- 34th Brigade (United Kingdom)
- 34th Brigade Royal Field Artillery

== United States ==
- 34th Combat Aviation Brigade, a unit of the United States Army
- 34th Division Sustainment Brigade, a unit of the United States Army

== See also ==
- 34th Battalion (disambiguation)
- 34th Division (disambiguation)
- 34th Regiment (disambiguation)
- 34th Squadron (disambiguation)
