= 34th Regiment =

34th Regiment or 34th Infantry Regiment may refer to:

- 34th (Cumberland) Regiment of Foot, a unit of the United Kingdom Army
- 34 (Northern) Signal Regiment, a unit of the United Kingdom Army
- 34th Infantry Regiment (United States), a unit of the United States Army
- 34th Infantry Regiment (Greece)

American Civil War regiments

- 34th Regiment Indiana Infantry
- 34th Illinois Volunteer Infantry Regiment
- 34th Iowa Volunteer Infantry Regiment
- 34th Regiment Kentucky Volunteer Infantry
- 34th Ohio Infantry
- 34th Wisconsin Volunteer Infantry Regiment

== See also ==
- 34th Division (disambiguation)
- 34th Brigade (disambiguation)
- 34th Squadron (disambiguation)
