= List of United States Air Force intelligence squadrons =

This article lists the intelligence squadrons of the United States Air Force. The purpose of intelligence units is to collect and analyze information to assist Air Force commanders in their decisions.

== Intelligence squadrons ==
| Squadron | Shield | Location | Nickname | Note |
|---|---|---|---|---|
| 3rd Intelligence Squadron | | Fort Gordon | Desert Jackals | Activated 1 Nov 2010 |
| 5th Intelligence Squadron | | Fort Gordon | Ghosts | Activated 26 September 2014 |
| 6th Intelligence Squadron | | Osan AB | | |
| 7th Intelligence Squadron | | Fort Meade | | |
| 8th Intelligence Squadron | | Hickam AFB | Sentinels | Distributed Common Ground System (aka DGS-5) |
| 9th Intelligence Squadron | | Beale AFB | | Distributed Common Ground System (aka DGS-2) |
| 10th Intelligence Squadron | | Langley AFB | Black Knights | Distributed Common Ground System (aka DGS-1) |
| 11th Intelligence Squadron | | Hurlburt Field | | 11th Special Operations Intelligence Squadron on 31 July 2016 |
| 12th Intelligence Squadron | | Davis Monthan AFB | | Formerly the 12th Tactical Intelligence Squadron |
| 13th Intelligence Squadron | | Beale AFB | Dark Knights | AN/GSQ-272 (DGS-2) Operations |
| 14th Intelligence Squadron | | Wright-Patterson AFB | | U. S. Air Force Reserve |
| 15th Intelligence Squadron | | Langley AFB | | Inactivated |
| 18th Intelligence Squadron | | Wright-Patterson AFB | | |
| 19th Intelligence Squadron | | AFB | | |
| 20th Intelligence Squadron | | Offutt AFB | | |
| 21st Intelligence Squadron | | Wright-Patterson AFB | | |
| 22d Intelligence Squadron | | Fort Meade | | |
| 23d Intelligence Squadron | | Joint Base San Antonio (JBSA) | | U.S. Air Force Reserve |
| 24th Intelligence Squadron | | Ramstein AB, GE | | DGS-4 |
| 25th Intelligence Squadron | | Hurlburt Field | | |
| 26th Intelligence Squadron | | Vogelweh Cantonment | | |
| 27th Intelligence Squadron | | Langley AFB | | |
| 28th Intelligence Squadron | | Hurlburt Field | | |
| 29th Intelligence Squadron | | Fort Meade | Black Knights | |
| 30th Intelligence Squadron | | Langley AFB | | DGS-1 |
| 31st Intelligence Squadron | | Fort Gordon | Desert Knights | |
| 32d Intelligence Squadron | | Fort Meade | | |
| 33d Intelligence Squadron | | Howard AFB | | 1993-1996; Redesignated 33d Info Ops Sq |
| 34th Intelligence Squadron | | | | |
| 36th Intelligence Squadron | | Langley AFB | | |
| 37th Intelligence Squadron | | Joint Base Pearl Harbor-Hickam | | |
| 38th Intelligence Squadron | | Beale AFB | | |
| 39th Intelligence Squadron | | Hurlburt Field | | Redesignated 39th Info Ops Sq |
| 41st Intelligence Squadron | | Fort Meade | Vikings | Activated 8 October 2014 |
| 42d Intelligence Squadron | | Langley AFB | | |
| 43d Intelligence Squadron | | | | |
| 45th Intelligence Squadron | | | | |
| 48th Intelligence Squadron | | Beale AFB | West Coast Cowboys | DGS-2 Systems, Communications, Maintenance |
| 50th Intelligence Squadron | | Beale AFB | | U.S. Air Force Reserve |
| 63rd Intelligence Squadron | | Langley AFB | | |
| 64th Intelligence Squadron | | Wright Patterson AFB | | U. S. Air Force Reserve |
| 68th Intelligence Squadron | | Brooks AFB | | Redesignated 68th Information Operations Squadron |
| 71st Intelligence Squadron | | Wright Patterson AFB | | U. S. Air Force Reserve |
| 91st Intelligence Squadron | | Fort Meade | | 1993-2005; Redesignated 91st Network Warfare Squadron |
| 93d Intelligence Squadron | | Lackland AFB | | Medina Annex, San Antonio, TX |
| 94th Intelligence Squadron | | Fort Meade | Cougars | |
| 97th Intelligence Squadron | | Offutt AFB | | |
| 101st Intelligence Squadron | | | | |
| 117th Intelligence Squadron | | Birmingham, Alabama | | |
| 123d Intelligence Squadron | | Little Rock, Arkansas | | |
| 124th Intelligence Squadron | | Springfield, Ohio | | |
| 125th Intelligence Squadron | | Springfield, Ohio | | |
| 126th Intelligence Squadron | | Springfield, Ohio | | |
| 127th Intelligence Squadron | | Wright-Patterson AFB | | |
| 137th Intelligence Squadron | | Terre Haute, Indiana | Racers | |
| 139th Intelligence Squadron | | Fort Gordon | Guard Dogs | |
| 152d Intelligence Squadron | | Reno, Nevada | | |
| 161st Intelligence Squadron | | McConnell AFB | Jayhawkers | |
| 192d Intelligence Squadron | | Langley AFB | | |
| 194th Intelligence Squadron | | | | |
| 201st Intelligence Squadron | | | Hickam AFB | |
| 250th Intelligence Squadron | | | Kirtland AFB | |
| 234th Intelligence Squadron | | Beale AFB | | |
| 256th Intelligence Squadron | | Fairchild AFB | | Previously designated 256th Combat Communications Squadron |
| 301st Intelligence Squadron | | Misawa AB | Tigers | |
| 303d Intelligence Squadron | | Osan AB | Skivvy Nine | DGS-3 |
| 306th Intelligence Squadron | | Beale AFB | Firebirds | |
| 315th Intelligence Squadron | | Yokota AB | | Redesignated Network Warfare Squadron |
| 324th Intelligence Squadron | | Hickam AFB | Tigers | |
| 381st Intelligence Squadron | | Elmendorf AFB | | |
| 390th Intelligence Squadron | | Kadena AB | | |
| 392d Intelligence Squadron | | Hickam AFB | | |
| 402d Intelligence Squadron | | Darmstadt Dagger Complex, Germany | | |
| 426th Intelligence Squadron | | Vogelweh Cantonment | | Redesignated Info Ops Sq |
| 450th Intelligence Squadron | | Ramstein AB | | |
| 451st Intelligence Squadron | | Fort Gordon | Desert Reapers | Reactivated 11 July 2019 |
| 485th Intelligence Squadron | | Mainz-Kastel, Germany | | |
| 488th Intelligence Squadron | | RAF Mildenhall | | |
| 526th Intelligence Squadron | | | | |
| 547th Intelligence Squadron | | Nellis AFB | | |
| 566th Intelligence Squadron | | Buckley Space Force Base, Colorado | | |
| 718th Intelligence Squadron | | Joint Base Langley–Eustis | | U.S. Air Force Reserve |

== See also ==
- List of United States Air Force squadrons
