= 43rd Intelligence Squadron =

43d Intelligence Squadron
- Active: 1943-1951; 1951–1977; 2011–present
- Country: United States
- Branch: United States Air Force
- Type: Squadron (air force)
- Role: Intelligence
- Part of: Air Combat Command
- Garrison/HQ: Cannon Air Force Base, New Mexico
- Motto(s): "Born Under Fire"
- Mascot(s): Falcon
- Engagements: Mediterranean Theater of Operations; Korean War
- Decorations: Air Force Meritorious Unit Award; Air Force Outstanding Unit Award; Republic of Korea Presidential Unit Citation

Insignia
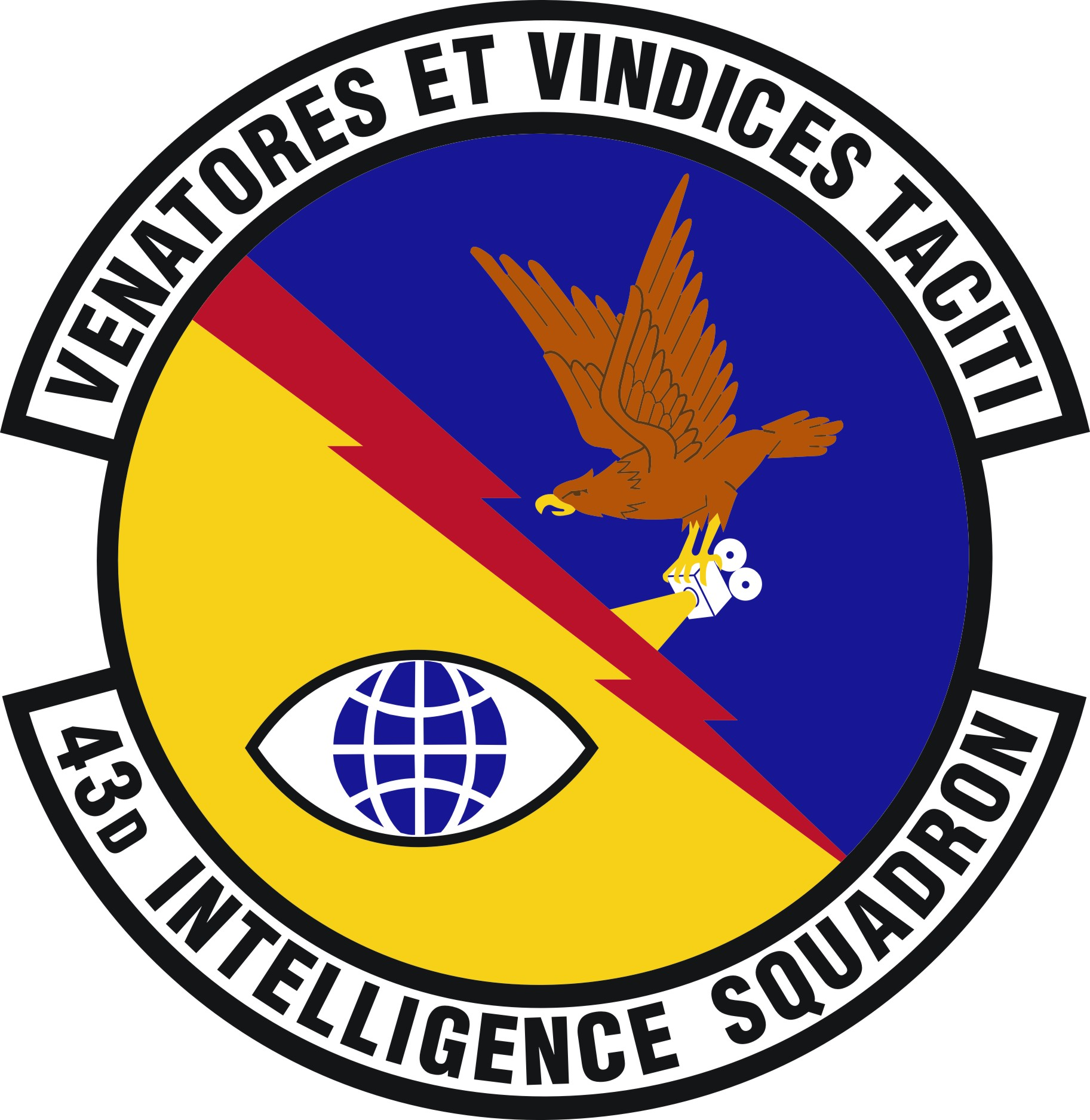
- 43d Intelligence Squadron emblem

The United States Air Force's 43d Intelligence Squadron is an intelligence unit located at Cannon Air Force Base, New Mexico. It provides intelligence support to Air Force Special Operations Command.

== Mission ==
The squadron is a uniquely tasked unit, chartered to provide specialized intelligence across the spectrum of conflict. Squadron personnel are trained and qualified to operate as aircrew on board almost every combat aircraft within the Air Force Special Operations Command inventory. By integrating all-source intelligence and electronic combat capability for special operations forces, the 43rd has made its unique intelligence resources integral to special operations mission planning, rehearsal, and execution.

== History ==
=== World War II ===
The 43d was first activated in Tunisia during World War II as the 4th Photographic Technical Squadron and assigned to the North African Photographic Reconnaissance Wing (Provisional) on 2 November 1943. When the 90th Photographic Wing replaced the provisional wing, the 4th Squadron was assigned to it. When the 5th Photographic Group was assigned to Fifteenth Air Force, the squadron was assigned to it, and for the remainder of the war provided processing and interpretation of mapping, bomb damage assessment and targeting materials produced by the group.

=== Korean War ===
In August 1949, the squadron was redesignated the 363d Reconnaissance Technical Squadron. When the Korean War broke out in June 1950, the squadron was rushed to Japan to support reconnaissance operations of Far East Air Forces (FEAF). In September, these operations were brought together under the 543d Tactical Support Group. The squadron was inactivated in March 1951, when the 67th Tactical Reconnaissance Wing took over FEAF's expanding aerial reconnaissance operations and its assets transferred to the 67th Reconnaissance Technical Squadron.

=== Cold War ===
The squadron was activated the same day at Shaw Air Force Base, South Carolina and assigned to the 363d Tactical Reconnaissance Wing. It was awarded an Air Force Outstanding Unit Award in 1962, for its support of reconnaissance operations during the Cuban Missile Crisis. It was inactivated on 1 September 1977. In 1984, the squadron was redesignated the 23d Reconnaissance Technical Squadron, but it was never active with this name.

=== Intelligence support for special operations forces ===
Shortly after the 1 October 2007 conversion of the 27th Fighter Wing to the 27th Special Operations Wing, Detachment 1, 25th Intelligence Squadron was organized to extend the 25th's intelligence support to the wing's new mission. In response to the wing's rapid growth and demand for increased support, on 1 November 2011, the 43d Intelligence Squadron was activated to replace Detachment 1.

== Lineage ==
- Constituted as the 4th Photographic Technical Squadron

Activated on 2 November 1943
Redesignated 363d Reconnaissance Technical Squadron on 4 August 1949
Inactivated on 1 March 1951

- Activated on 1 March 1951

Inactivated on 1 September 1977

- Redesignated 23d Reconnaissance Technical Squadron on 16 October 1984
- Redesignated 43d Intelligence Squadron on 7 October 2011

Activated on 1 November 2011

=== Assignments ===
- North African Photographic Reconnaissance Wing (Provisional), 2 November 1943
- 90th Photographic Wing, 22 November 1943
- 5th Photographic Group, c. 11 October 1944
- Third Air Force, September 1945
- Fifteenth Air Force, March 1946
- Tactical Air Command, June 1946
- Fourteenth Air Force, December 1948
- Ninth Air Force, February 1949
- Tactical Air Command, August 1950
- 543d Tactical Support Group, c. 26 September 1950
- Fifth Air Force, 25 February 1951 – 1 March 1951
- 363d Tactical Reconnaissance Wing, 1 March 1951 – 1 September 1977
- 361st Intelligence, Surveillance and Reconnaissance Group, 1 November 2011

=== Stations ===
- La Marsa Airfield, Tunisia, 2 November 1943
- San Severo Airfield, Italy, 19 December 1943
- Bari, Italy, c. 11 October 1944 – August 1945
- MacDill Field, Florida, 21 December 1945
- Langley Field (later Langley Air Force Base), Virginia, 15 July 1946
- Itazuke Air Base, Japan, July 1950
- Taegu Air Base, South Korea, October 1950 – 1 March 1951
- Shaw Air Force Base, South Carolina, 1 March 1951 – 1 September 77
- Cannon Air Force Base, New Mexico, 1 November 2011 – present

=== Decorations ===
Award streamer	Award	Dates	Notes
	Air Force Meritorious Unit Award	1 January 2013 - 31 December 2013	43d Intelligence Squadron
	Air Force Outstanding Unit Award	23 October 1962 - 24 November 1962	363d Reconnaissance Technical Squadron
	Air Force Outstanding Unit Award	1 January 2011 - 31 December 2011	43d Intelligence Squadron
	Air Force Outstanding Unit Award	1 January 2012 - 31 December 2012	43d Intelligence Squadron
	Korean Presidential Unit Citation	July 1950 – 1 March 1951	363d Reconnaissance Technical Squadron
