= 361st Intelligence, Surveillance, and Reconnaissance Group =

361st Intelligence, Surveillance and Reconnaissance Group
- Active: 1943–1944; 2008–present
- Country: United States
- Branch: United States Air Force
- Type: Group
- Role: Intelligence
- Part of: Air Combat Command
- Garrison/HQ: Hurlburt Field, Florida
- Decorations: Air Force Meritorious Unit Award; Air Force Outstanding Unit Award with Combat "V" Device; Air Force Outstanding Unit Award

Insignia
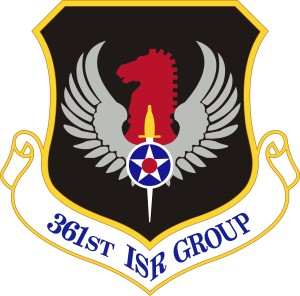
- 361st Intelligence, Surveillance, and Reconnaissance Group emblem (Approved 8 November 2008)

The United States Air Force's 361st Intelligence, Surveillance, and Reconnaissance Group is an intelligence unit located at Hurlburt Field, Florida. It provides intelligence support to Air Force Special Operations Command.

The group was first activated during World War II as the 11th Photographic Group when the 1st Photographic Charting Group was expanded into two groups in 1943. Although its headquarters remained in the United States, squadrons and detachments of the group served in most combat theaters. It was disbanded in 1944, when its elements and other reconnaissance units were consolidated under the 311th Photographic Wing.

== Mission ==
The 361st Intelligence, Surveillance, and Reconnaissance Group supports Air Force Special Operations Command (AFSOC) and provides analytical and targeting support to the rest of the Air Force. The group provides threat warning and enhances situational awareness to AFSOC aircrews across the spectrum of operations from conflict through humanitarian relief. The group and subordinate units conduct cultural and network studies to enhance tactics and ensure interoperability within the special operations community and conduct research and development of communications sites. The group's airmen act as aircrew on almost every aircraft type within AFSOC.

== History ==
=== World War II ===
The 361st Intelligence, Surveillance, and Reconnaissance Group was activated as the 11th Photographic Group (Mapping) at Reading Army Air Field, Pennsylvania in December 1943. Its original squadrons were the 1st and 19th Photographic Charting Squadrons at Bradley Field, Connecticut and the 3d Photographic Reconnaissance Squadron at MacDill Field, Florida. All three squadrons were transferred from the 1st Photographic Charting Group at Bolling Field, in the District of Columbia. However, one flight of the 19th Squadron was deployed to Mexico City until 20 December. In January 1944, group headquarters and the two squadrons at Bradley joined the 3d at MacDill.

The 19th Squadron's stay at MacDill was brief, for its air echelon deployed to Cairo, Egypt on 30 January, moving to Deversoir Air Base, Egypt four days later. The squadron remained in Egypt for the rest of the time it was assigned to the 11th Group. In April 1944, the 3d Squadron moved to Smoky Hill Army Air Field, Kansas, where it began to train with the Boeing F-13 Superfortress in preparation for its September move to Saipan where it began performing long range reconnaissance missions for Twentieth Air Force, although it was still assigned to the 11th.

The group's early missions included the photographic mapping of the United States and sending detachments to the Chine-Burma-India Theater, the Near and Middle East, Mexico, Canada, Alaska, and the Caribbean to conduct similar missions. It was disbanded on 5 October 1944 and its component squadrons transferred directly to the 311th Photographic Wing.

=== Intelligence operations ===
The Air Force reconstituted group as the 361st Tactical Intelligence Group on 31 July 1985, but did not activate it. The group was renamed the 361st Intelligence, Surveillance, and Reconnaissance Group in October 2008 and on 29 October, the Air Force Intelligence, Surveillance, and Reconnaissance Agency activated the group at Hurlburt Field, Florida. The new group, under Air Force Special Operations Command operational control, took command of the 19th Intelligence Squadron at Pope Army Air Field (then Pope Air Force Base), North Carolina, and the 25th Intelligence Squadron at Hurlburt Field, Florida.

== Lineage ==
- Constituted as the 11th Photographic Group (Mapping) on 19 November 1943

Activated in December 1943
Disbanded on 5 October 1944

- Reconstituted and redesignated as 361st Tactical Intelligence Group on 31 July 1985
- Redesignated as 361st Intelligence, Surveillance and Reconnaissance Group on 10 October 2008

Activated on 29 October 2008

=== Assignments ===
- Army Air Forces, 1 December 1943
- 311th Photographic Wing, 5 March – 5 October 1944
- Air Force Intelligence, Surveillance and Reconnaissance Agency (later Twenty-Fifth Air Force), 29 October 2008 – 18 January 2015
- 363d Intelligence, Surveillance and Reconnaissance Wing, 18 January 2015 – present

=== Components ===
- 1st Photographic Charting Squadron, 1 December 1943 – 5 October 1944
- 3d Photographic Reconnaissance Squadron, 1 December 1943 – 5 October 1944
- 19th Photographic Charting Squadron, 1 December 1943 – 5 October 1944
- 25th Intelligence Squadron, 29 October 2008 – present

Hurlburt Field, Florida

- 19th Intelligence Squadron, 29 October 2008 – present

Pope Army Air Field, North Carolina

- 43d Intelligence Squadron, 1 November 2011 – present

Cannon Air Force Base, New Mexico

- 306th Intelligence Squadron, 12 October 2012 – present

Will Rogers Air National Guard Base, Oklahoma

=== Stations ===
- Reading Army Air Field, Pennsylvania, 1 December 1943
- MacDill Field, Florida, 5 January – 5 October 1944
- Hurlburt Field, Florida, 29 October 2008 – present

=== Aircraft ===
- Beechcraft F-2 Expeditor, 1943–1944
- Douglas F-3 Havoc, 1943–1944
- Consolidated F-7 Liberator, 1943–1944
- Boeing F-9 Flying Fortress, 1943–1944
- North American F-10 Mitchell, 1943–1944
- Boeing F-13 Superfortress, 1944

=== Campaigns and awards ===
Although deployed squadrons and elements of the group earned service and campaign credit during World War II, the 11th Photographic Group headquarters earned no campaign credit and was not active long enough to earn service credit for the American Theater of World War II.

Award streamer	Award	Dates	Notes
	Air Force Outstanding Unit Award with Combat "V" Device	1 January 2009 – 31 December 2009	361st Intelligence, Surveillance and Reconnaissance Group
	Air Force Meritorious Unit Award	1 January 2010 – 31 December 2010	361st Intelligence, Surveillance and Reconnaissance Group
	Air Force Outstanding Unit Award	1 January 2011 – 31 December 2011	361st Intelligence, Surveillance and Reconnaissance Group
	Air Force Outstanding Unit Award	1 January 2012 – 31 December 2012	361st Intelligence, Surveillance and Reconnaissance Group
	Air Force Meritorious Unit Award	1 January 2013 – 31 December 2013	361st Intelligence, Surveillance and Reconnaissance Group

== See also ==
- B-17 Flying Fortress units of the United States Army Air Forces
- B-24 Liberator units of the United States Army Air Forces
- List of B-29 Superfortress operators
- List of Douglas A-20 Havoc operators
- List of United States Air Force Groups
