= 9th Special Operations Squadron =

9th Special Operations Squadron

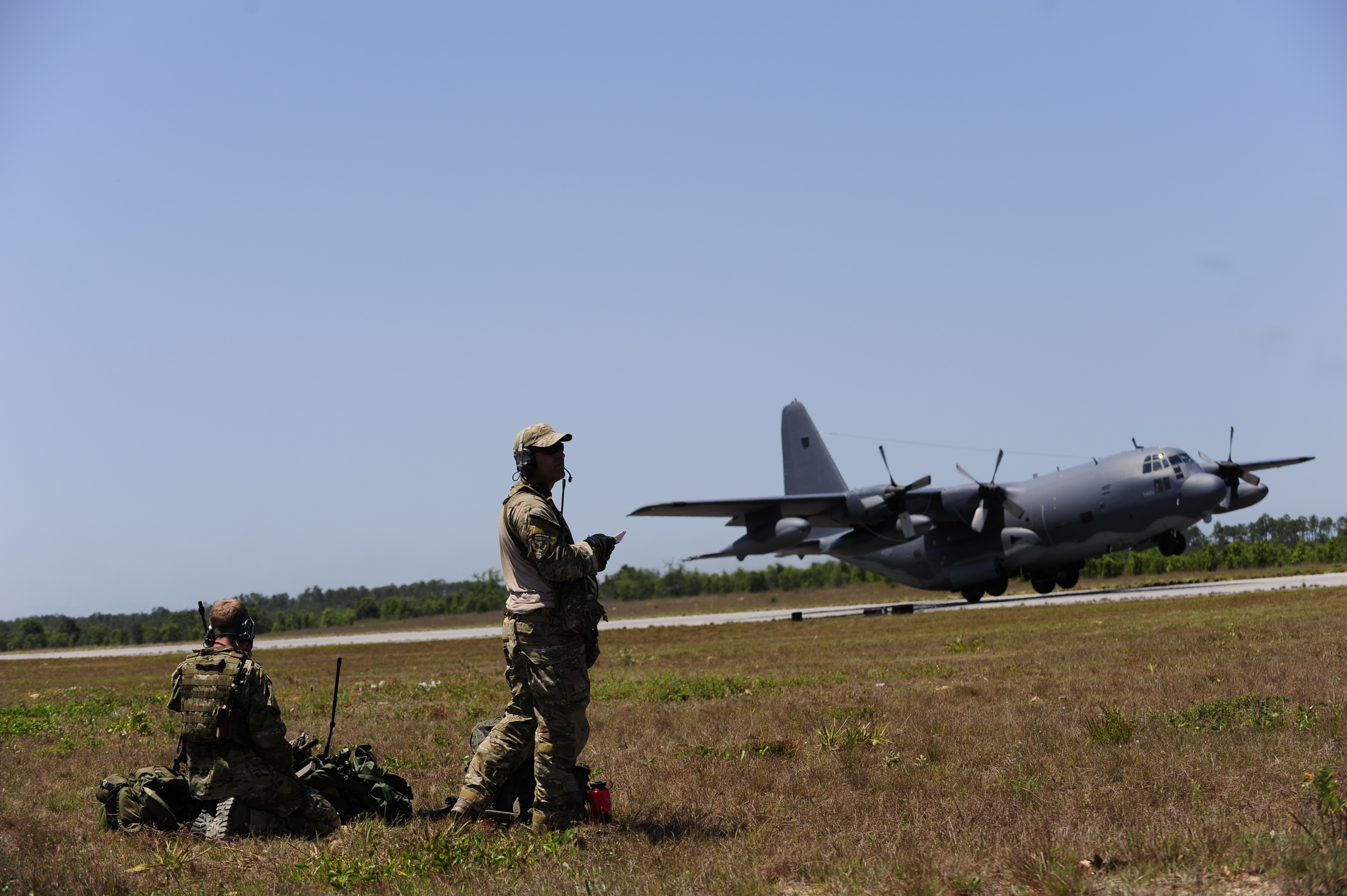
- Squadron MC-130P takes off during Operation Nimble Response
- Active: 1944–1948; 1951–1963; 1967–1972; 1988–present
- Country: United States
- Branch: United States Air Force
- Role: Special Operations
- Part of: Air Force Special Operations Command
- Garrison/HQ: Cannon Air Force Base
- Nickname(s): Night Wings
- Motto(s): Per Tartarum ad Metam Latin Through Hell to the Target (1961-1963); Chiêu Hồi (Vietnamese) Open Arms (Vietnam era)
- Engagements: Pacific Theater of Operations Vietnam War
- Decorations: Distinguished Unit Citation; Gallant Unit Citation; Air Force Outstanding Unit Award with Combat "V"; Republic of Vietnam Gallantry Cross with Palm

Insignia
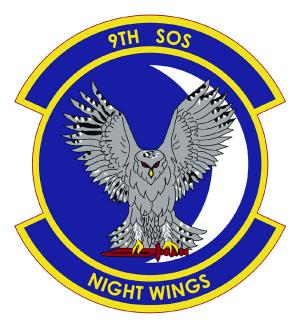
- 9th Special Operations Squadron emblem (Note: Approved 7 July 1988.)

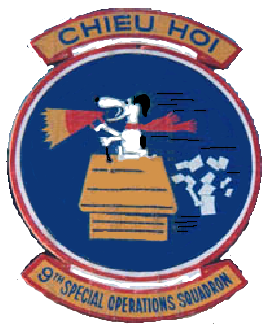
- 9th Special Operations Squadron emblem (Note: Approved 7 March 1969.)

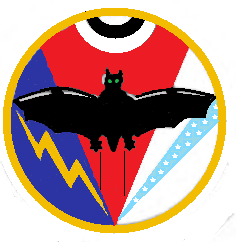
- 39th Bombardment Squadron emblem (Note: Approved 11 April 1961.)

The 9th Special Operations Squadron is part of the 27th Special Operations Wing (27 SOW) at Cannon Air Force Base, New Mexico. The squadron operates MC-130J Commando II aircraft in support of special operations. The 9th SOS specializes in the use of night vision goggles and formation tactics to refuel large helicopter and tilt-rotor formations. On 9 December 2014, the 522nd SOS was re-flagged as the 9th SOS moved from its location at Hurlburt Field to join the 27 SOW at Cannon Air Force Base.

== Mission ==
Clandestine penetration of enemy territory using low-level formation procedures to provide aerial refueling of special operations helicopters and the insertion, extraction, and resupply of special operations forces by low or high altitude airdrop or airland operations.

== History ==
=== B-29 Superfortress operations against Japan ===
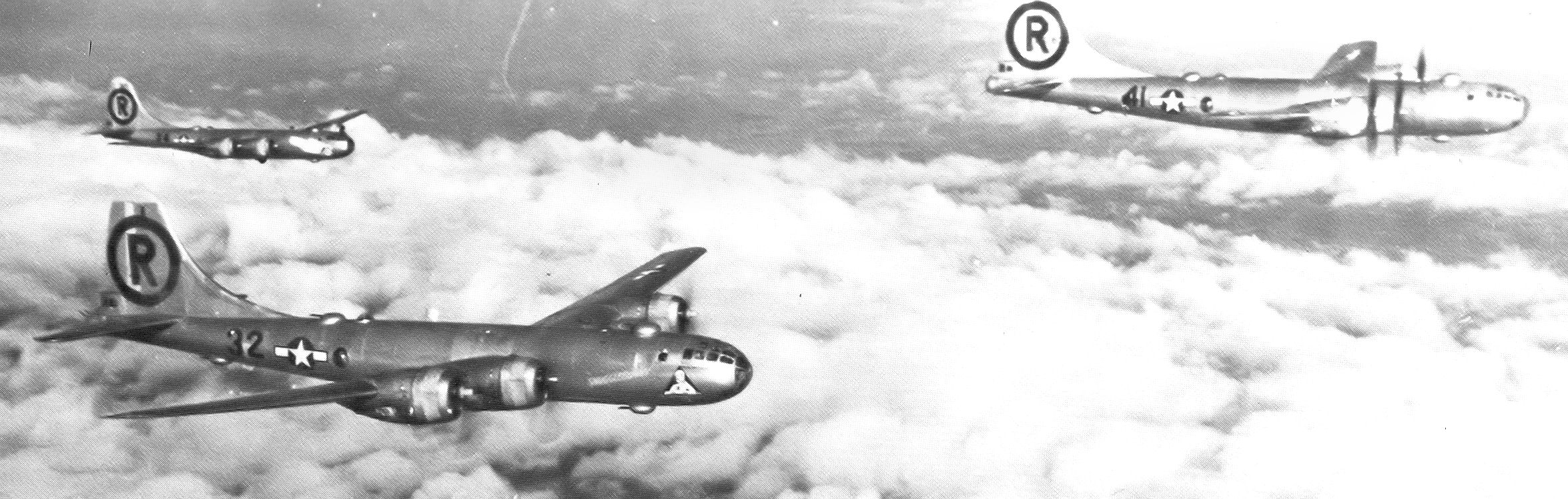
6th Bombardment Group B-29s

Activated on 1 April 1944 as a Boeing B-29 Superfortress Very Heavy bombardment squadron. When training was completed moved to North Field Tinianin the Mariana Islands of the Central Pacific Area in January 1945 and assigned to XXI Bomber Command, Twentieth Air Force. Its mission was the strategic bombardment of the Japanese Home Islands and the destruction of its war-making capability.

Flew "shakedown" missions against Japanese targets on Moen Island, Truk, and other points in the Carolines and Marianas. The squadron began combat missions over Japan on 25 February 1945 with a firebombing mission over Northeast Tokyo. The squadron continued to participate in wide area firebombing attack, but the first ten-day blitz resulting in the Army Air Forces running out of incendiary bombs. Until then the squadron flew conventional strategic bombing missions using high explosive bombs.

The squadron continued attacking urban areas with incendiary raids until the end of the war in August 1945, attacking major Japanese cities, causing massive destruction of urbanized areas. Also conducted raids against strategic objectives, bombing aircraft factories, chemical plants, oil refineries, and other targets in Japan. The squadron flew its last combat missions on 14 August when hostilities ended. Afterwards, its B 29s carried relief supplies to Allied prisoner of war camps in Japan and Manchuria

The squadron remained in Western Pacific, assigned to Twentieth Air Force on Okinawa. Maintained as a strategic bombardment squadron until inactivated due to budget reductions in late 1948. Some aircraft scrapped on Tinian; others flew to storage depots in the United States.

=== Strategic Air Command ===
Reactivated in 1951 as a result of the expansion of the Air Force after the breakout of the Cold War. Initially equipped with second-line B-29 Superfortress medium bombers for training; redesignated as a heavy bomb squadron in 1952 and equipped with new Convair B-36 Peacemaker intercontinental strategic bombers. Initially was equipped with B-36Fs. Later Featherweight III B-36Js were added, the squadron operating both types. Carried red stripe on the tip of the vertical stabilizer; the lip of the jet intakes and the "nose cone" of the jet itself along with the triangle-R tail code. SAC eliminated tail codes in 1953. In 1957 the B-36s were replaced with B-52E Stratofortress aircraft and all squadron markings were eliminated. While retaining combat capability, the 9th trained B-52 crews for Strategic Air Command from 15 July 1959 – September 1963. Remained equipped with the B-52s until the closure of Walker AFB in 1967.

=== Vietnam War ===
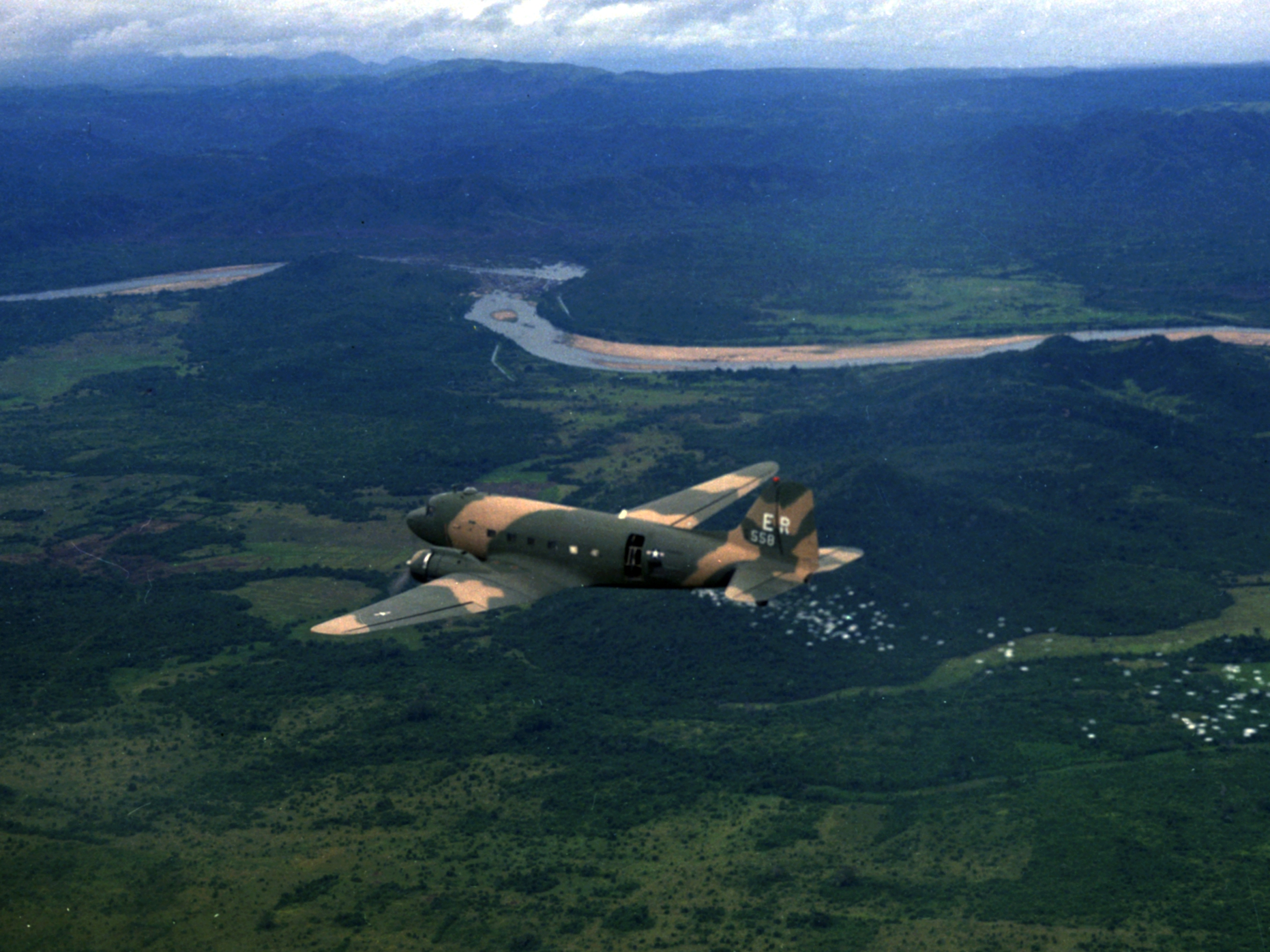
A 9th SOS C-47D dropping leaflets near Nha Trang, 1969.

Consolidated with the Vietnam Era 9th Air Commando Squadron (Psychological Operations) in 1985. The 9th ACS was re-designated as the 9th Special Operations Squadron (SOS) in 1969. The 9th SOS operated Douglas HC-47 Skytrain and Cessna O-2B aircraft over South Vietnam, Laos and Cambodia from 1968 until January 1972 in support of the US Army 4th Psychological Operations Group psychological warfare initiatives.

9th SOS aircraft were primarily based at three operating locations in the Republic of Viet Nam: Da Nang AB, Phan Rang AB and Tuy Hoa AB.(During the period Oct 1970 to Sep 1971 the 9th SOS operated out of Bien Hoa AFB and was operating there prior to this time period. The area served from Bien Hoa was the entire Delta and the ARVN III Corps area. source see ) The 9TH SOS disseminated leaflets during daylight operations and broadcast propaganda during night missions. A significant number of 9th SOS flight operations were in support of the "Chieu Hoi" or "Open Arms" campaign which was designed to induce North Vietnamese Army Personnel and Viet Cong guerrillas to defect to the Republic of Viet Nam. These "Chieu Hoi" psychological warfare missions were reported to have directly and indirectly influenced tens of thousands of enemy personnel to defect. 9th SOS HC-47 aircraft also conducted flare drop missions in support of night combat operations against enemy forces in South Viet Nam. The 9th SOS was Inactivated in 1972 as part of the drawdown of forces in Indochina.

Reactivated in 1988 as a special operations unit, the squadron has trained for special operations, refuelling and resupply missions using modified C-130 aircraft. It has seen combat in Panama, 20 December 1989 – 14 January 1990 and Southwest Asia, 16 January 1991 – 5 April 1991. It routinely deployed personnel and aircraft to contingency operations in the Balkans and Southwest Asia from, 1991–2001. The squadron has participated in combat operations in Afghanistan since October 2001 and Iraq since March 2003.

=== Operations and decorations ===
- Combat Operations: Combat in Western Pacific, 27 Jan-14 Aug 1945. Combat in Southeast Asia, Mar 1967 – Jan 1972. Performed special operations, day or night aerial refuelling, infiltration/exfiltration and resupply missions using modified C-130 aircraft, 1988–. Combat in Panama, 20 Dec 1989-14 Jan 1990 and Southwest Asia, 16 Jan-5 Apr 1991. After the 11 Sep 2001 terrorist attack on the US, served on the forefront of Global War on Terrorism in Iraq and Afghanistan, 2001–.
- Campaigns: World War II: Eastern Mandates; Western Pacific; Air Offensive, Japan. Vietnam: Vietnam Air Offensive; Vietnam Air Offensive, Phase II; Vietnam Air Offensive, Phase III; Vietnam Air/Ground; Vietnam Air Offensive, Phase IV; TET 69/Counteroffensive; Vietnam Summer-Fall, 1969; Vietnam Winter-Spring, 1970; Sanctuary Counteroffensive; Monsoon; Commando Hunt V; Commando Hunt VI; Commando Hunt VII. Southwest Asia: Defense of Saudi Arabia; Liberation and Defense of Kuwait.
- Armed Forces Expeditionary Streamers. Panama, 1989–1990.
- Decorations: Distinguished Unit Citations: Tokyo, Japan, 25 May 1945; Japanese Empire, 9–19 Jul 1945. Presidential Unit Citations: Vietnam, 1–7 Mar 1967; Vietnam, 21 Jun 1968 – 30 Jun 1969. Air Force Outstanding Unit Awards with Combat "V" device: 16 Jun 1967 – 20 Jun 1968; 1 Jul 1970 – 30 Jun 1971; 1 Jun 1997 – 31 May 1999; 1 Jul 2003 – 30 Jun 2005. Gallant Unit Citation: 6 Oct 2001 – 30 May 2003. Air Force Outstanding Unit Awards: 1 May 1960 – 31 May 1962; 1 May 1988 – 30 Apr 1990; 16 Apr 1992 – 15 Apr 1994; 1 Jun 1995 – 31 May 1997; 1 Jul 1999 – 30 Jun 2001; 1 Jul 2001 – 30 Jun 2003; 1 Sep 2004 – 31 Aug 2006. Republic of Vietnam Gallantry Cross with Palm: [Mar] 1967-1 Aug 1968; 16 Jun 1967–[9 Jan] 1972; 1 Jan-30 Aug 1968; 5 Oct 1971–[9] Jan 1972.

== Lineage ==
39th Bombardment Squadron

- Constituted as the 39th Bombardment Squadron, Very Heavy on 28 March 1944

Activated on 1 April 1944
Inactivated on 18 October 1948

- Redesignated 39th Bombardment Squadron, Medium on 20 December 1950

Activated on 2 January 1951
Redesignated 39th Bombardment Squadron, Heavy on 16 June 1952
Discontinued and inactivated on 15 September 1963

- Consolidated with the 9th Special Operations Squadron as the 9th Special Operations Squadron on 19 September 1985

9th Special Operations Squadron

- Constituted as the 9th Air Commando Squadron (Psychological Operations) and activated on 9 January 1967 (not organized)

Organized on 25 January 1967
Redesignated 9th Special Operations Squadron on 1 August 1968
Inactivated on 29 February 1972

- Consolidated with the 39th Bombardment Squadron on 19 September 1985
- Activated on 1 March 1988

=== Assignments ===
- 6th Bombardment Group, 1 April 1944 – 18 October 1948
- 6th Bombardment Group, 2 January 1951
- 6th Bombardment Wing (later, 6 Strategic Aerospace Wing), 16 June 1952 – 15 September 1963
- Pacific Air Forces, 9 January 1967 (not organized)
- 14th Air Commando Wing (later 14 Special Operations Wing), 25 January 1967
- 315th Tactical Airlift Wing, 30 September 1971
- 377th Air Base Wing, 15 January 1972 – 29 February 1972
- 39th Special Operations Wing, 1 March 1988
- 1st Special Operations Wing, 18 April 1989
- 1st Special Operations Group, 22 September 1992 – 8 December 2014
- 27th Special Operations Group, 9 December 2014 – present

=== Stations ===
- Dalhart Army Air Field, Texas, 1 April 1944
- Grand Island Army Airfield, Nebraska, 26 May – 18 November 1944
- North Field, Tinian, 28 December 1944
- Clark Field, Luzon, Philippines, 13 March 1946
- Kadena Air Base, Okinawa, 1 June 1947 – 18 October 1948
- Walker Air Force Base, New Mexico, 2 January 1951 – 15 September 1963
- Pleiku Air Base, South Vietnam, 25 January 1967
- Nha Trang Air Base, South Vietnam, 1 September 1967
- Tuy Hoa Air Base, South Vietnam, 5 September 1969
- Phan Rang Air Base, South Vietnam, 15 August 1970 – 29 February 1972
- Eglin Air Force Base, Florida, 1 March 1988
- Hurlburt Field, Florida, 20 May 2013 – 8 December 2014
- Cannon Air Force Base, New Mexico, 9 December 2014 – present

=== Aircraft ===
- Boeing B-17 Flying Fortress (1944)
- Boeing B-29 Superfortress (1944–1947, 1951–1952)
- Convair B-36 Peacemaker (1952–1957)
- Boeing B-52 Stratofortress (1957–1963)
- Douglas C-47 Skytrain (1967–1972)
- Helio U-10 Super Courier (1967)
- Cessna O-2 Skymaster (1967–1972)
- Lockheed MC-130P Combat Shadow (1988 – 2014)
- Lockheed MC-130J Commando II (2014–Present)

== See also ==
- List of United States Air Force special operations squadrons
- List of C-130 Hercules operators
- List of C-47 Skytrain operators
- List of B-52 Units of the United States Air Force
- List of B-29 Superfortress operators
