= Cannon Air Force Base =

US Air Force base near Clovis, New Mexico

- Near Clovis, New Mexico in United States of America

Site information
- Type: US Air Force base
- Owner: Department of Defense
- Operator: US Air Force
- Controlled by: Air Force Special Operations Command (AFSOC)
- Condition: Operational
- Website: www.cannon.af.mil

Location
- Location within North America Location within the United States Location within New Mexico
- Coordinates: 34°22′58″N 103°19′20″W

Site history
- Built: 1942 (as Army Air Base Clovis)
- In use: 1942 – present

Garrison information
- Current commander: Colonel Jeremy Bergin
- Garrison: 27th Special Operations Wing
- Occupants: 3rd Special Operations Sqn; 9th Special Operations Sqn; 12th Special Operations Sqn; 16th Special Operations Sqn; 20th Special Operations Sqn; 33rd Special Operations Sqn; 318th Special Operations Sqn; 551st Special Operations Sqn

Airfield information
- Identifiers: IATA: CVS, ICAO: KCVS, FAA LID: CVS, WMO: 722686
- Elevation: 1,309.2 metres (4,295 ft) AMSL
Runways
| Direction | Length and surface |
|---|---|
| 04/22 | 3,049 metres (10,003 ft) Concrete |
| 13/31 | 2,498 metres (8,196 ft) PEM |

Cannon Air Force Base is a United States Air Force base, located approximately 7 miles (11 km) southwest of Clovis, New Mexico. The host unit at Cannon is the 27th Special Operations Wing (27 SOW) also known as "The Steadfast Line". It is under the jurisdiction of Air Force Special Operations Command (AFSOC) which activated at the base on 1 October 2007. The 27 SOW plans and executes specialized and contingency operations using advanced aircraft, tactics and air refueling techniques to infiltrate, exfiltrate and resupply special operations forces (SOF) and provide intelligence, surveillance and reconnaissance and close air support in support of SOF operations.

A variety of special operations aircraft are stationed at Cannon, including the AC-130J Ghostrider, MC-130J Commando II, MQ-9 Reaper, CV-22 Osprey and U-28 Draco.

== The Steadfast Line ==
The 27 SOW traces its lineage to the 27 Bombardment Group from World War II. After their aircraft had been destroyed when attacked in the Philippines, the Airmen of the 27th Bomb Group converted into the 1st Provisional Air Corps Regiment (Infantry).

These airmen overcame significant battlefield challenges. They salvaged machine guns and cannons from crippled aircraft to fortify American fighting positions and vehicles with heavy weaponry.

Despite lacking formal infantry training, they quickly adapted. They trained alongside Army Infantry counterparts while under fire to become a staunch fighting force. Two battalions of maintenance, ordnance, intelligence, ground staff, and aircrew Airmen held the left flank of the US Army’s II Corps throughout the defense of Bataan, escaping encirclement in the final battles, earning them the moniker “The Steadfast Line.”

=== Previous Airfield Names ===
- Army Air Base, Clovis, 25 September 1942 (establishment)-7 April 1943
- Clovis Army Airfield, 8 April 1943 – 12 January 1948
- Clovis Air Force Base, 13 January 1948 – 7 June 1957
- Cannon Air Force Base, 8 June 1957–present

Cannon Air Force Base is named in honor of General John K. Cannon (1892–1955).

=== Airline service ===
The history of the base began in the late 1920s, when a civilian passenger facility, Portair Field, was established on the site.

Clovis was a stop on the first coast to coast "air/rail" service between Los Angeles and New York City which began in 1929. Transcontinental Air Transport (TAT) used a Ford Trimotor aircraft to fly passengers between Los Angeles and Clovis with en route stops at Kingman, AZ and Winslow, AZ as well as Albuquerque, NM. At Clovis, passengers heading east would then transfer and board an overnight train operated by the Atchison, Topeka and Santa Fe Railway to Waynoka, OK where they would connect to another TAT-operated Ford Trimotor aircraft the next morning and continue their journey to the Port Columbus Airport in Ohio (now the John Glenn Columbus International Airport) where they would transfer again for the final stage of the journey to New York City via the Pennsylvania Railroad. The same rail and flight services, transfers and connecting points were used by passengers heading west. In late 1930 the service had been modified to where the aircraft would fly the western portion of the service via Amarillo, TX rather than Clovis. Transcontinental Air Transport went on to merge with Western Air Express and form what would become Trans World Airlines (TWA) while Western Air Express would eventually once again regain its status as an independent air carrier and then subsequently be renamed Western Airlines. In later years, both TWA and Western evolved into major airlines operating extensive domestic and international route systems.

In 1948 a new carrier, Pioneer Air Lines, began serving Clovis with the airport being one of several stops on a route between Albuquerque and Dallas Love Field. The other stops included Santa Fe, NM, Las Vegas, NM and Tucumcari, NM as well as Lubbock, TX, Abilene, TX, Mineral Wells, TX and Fort Worth, TX. A second route was then created between Amarillo and El Paso, TX with stops at Clovis, Roswell, NM, and Las Cruces, NM. This second route crossed at Clovis with the initial route between Albuquerque and Dallas which resulted in Clovis being a small hub for Pioneer Air Lines where passengers were then able to connect between the two routes. Initially the airline used 21-seat Douglas DC-3 twin prop aircraft but then upgraded to the 36-seat Martin 2-0-2 twin prop aircraft in 1952.

In 1955 Pioneer was acquired by and merged into Continental Airlines which maintained the same basic service with DC-3 aircraft minus some of the stops and also subsequently upgraded its flights with Convair 340 twin prop aircraft followed by the British manufactured Vickers Viscount four engine turboprop in 1959 with the Viscount (which the airline referred to as the "Jet Power Viscount II") being the first turbine powered aircraft type to serve Clovis. The April 1, 1955 Continental system timetable listed three daily DC-3 flights serving the airport including a roundtrip Albuquerque - Santa Fe - Clovis - Lubbock - Abilene - Fort Worth - Dallas Love Field service as well as a one way westbound Houston Hobby Airport - College Station, TX - Temple, TX - Waco, TX - Dallas Love Field - Fort Worth - Abilene - Lubbock - Clovis - Santa Fe - Albuquerque flight. According to the September 27, 1959 Continental Airlines timetable, a Viscount propjet was being operated on a daily roundtrip routing of Albuquerque (ABQ) - Santa Fe (SAF) - Clovis (CVS) - Lubbock (LBB) - Abilene (ABI) - Fort Worth (via Greater Southwest International Airport) (GSW) - Dallas Love Field (DAL).

The Clovis Municipal Airport opened in 1959 and took over airline service for Clovis. However, for a brief period during the late 1970s, Texas International Airlines introduced 85-seat Douglas DC-9-10 jet service to Clovis, which was operated via Cannon. According to the March 15, 1978 Texas International system timetable, the airline was operating three departures every weekday from the airport with two nonstops to Albuquerque (ABQ) which offered connections via ABQ to TI DC-9 jet service on to Dallas/Fort Worth (DFW), Houston (IAH) and Los Angeles (LAX) as well as a nonstop flight to Hobbs, NM with this service continuing on to Carlsbad, NM. In 1978, Texas International reverted to using Convair 600 propjets via the Clovis Municipal Airport (CVN).

=== World War II ===
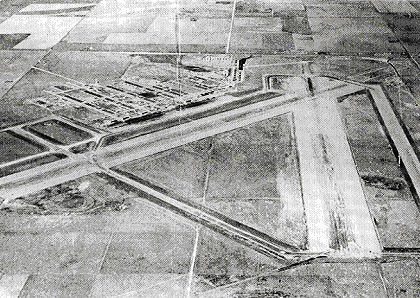
Clovis Army Airfield – 1943

After the United States entered World War II, the first military unit to use the facility was a glider detachment. On 6 July 1942 the base was assigned to Second Air Force. In 1943, the military began to use the facility as a bomber base. Clovis AAF was assigned to II Bomber Command, Second Air Force. On 8 April 1943, the base was renamed Clovis Army Air Field. The host unit at Clovis AAF was the 16th Bombardment Wing, a training unit for Consolidated B-24 Liberator bomber crews for Europe. The 16th Bomb Wing arrived in January 1943.

By mid-1946, the airfield was placed on reduced operational status due to postwar funding cutbacks and decreased flying activities. On 16 October 1946, the 234th AAFBU was inactivated and on 1 November 1946, the airfield was placed under the administrative control of Colorado Springs Army Air Base, Colorado. Clovis AAF was placed on temporarily inactive status on 28 May 1947.

=== Cold War ===
With the establishment of the United States Air Force (USAF) in September 1947, Clovis AAF was reactivated. The 509th Airdrome Group, Clovis Detachment took over day-to-day responsibilities for the airfield on 16 December 1947. The 509th operated Clovis AAF as a detachment from its headquarters at Roswell Army Air Field, New Mexico, using the airfield as a deployment facility for the group's B-29s. Clovis AAF was renamed "Clovis Air Force Base" on 13 January 1948. However, with no funds to host an active Strategic Air Command (SAC) bomb wing, Clovis AFB was placed on reserve/standby status on 1 July 1948. Its caretaker unit was the 234th Air Force Base Unit.

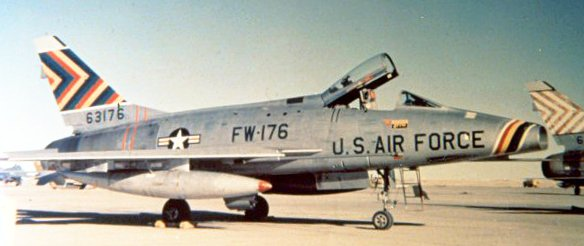
474th Tactical Fighter Wing Commanders' F-100D Super Sabre at Cannon AFB during the 1950s

Clovis AFB remained on standby status until 1 April 1950 when jurisdiction was transferred from SAC to Air Training Command (ATC). ATC assigned the base as a sub post of Reese AFB, Texas on 12 May 1950, while construction ensued to bring the base up to USAF standards. Plans were made to make Clovis AFB a contract flying training facility, however, the advent of the Korean War changed the USAF's plans for Clovis and jurisdiction was transferred to Tactical Air Command (TAC) as a fighter base on 23 July 1951.

The first USAF unit to use Clovis AFB was the Air National Guard's 140th Fighter-Bomber Wing (140th FBW), which arrived in October 1951 after being activated due to the Korean War. The 140th FBW was a composite unit, made up of elements from the Colorado, Utah and Wyoming Air National Guards.

From the early 1970s to the early 1990s Cannon AFB was the sole operator of the F-111D Aardvark tactical fighter bomber. The F-111D aircraft were operated by the 522nd, 523rd, and 524th Tactical Fighter Squadrons. The mesas and canyons of the largely unpopulated terrain in eastern New Mexico were ideal for training crews to use the F-111s terrain following radar. To obtain crew practice dropping ordnance, the F-111s used the nearby Melrose bomb range.

=== 21st century ===
On 13 May 2005, the Secretary of Defense recommended that Cannon Air Force Base be closed as part of the Base Realignment and Closure Commission (BRAC) process. However, on 25 August 2005, the BRAC Commission overturned the recommendation that the base be closed, but upheld the withdrawal of the base's F-16 Fighting Falcon fighter aircraft. The USAF had until 31 December 2009 to propose a new use for Cannon AFB, otherwise the base would be closed in 2010. Cannon AFB attempted to reopen a rejected EIS alternative, by substituting an Environmental Assessment. Comments were accepted through 4 October 2010.

On 20 June 2006, it was announced that Cannon AFB would transfer from Air Combat Command (ACC) and become an Air Force Special Operations Command (AFSOC) installation. Initial word was that the 16th Special Operations Wing would transfer from Hurlburt Field, Florida. It was later decided that the 27th Fighter Wing would transfer from ACC to AFSOC and become the 27th Special Operations Wing. This action would entail expanding and realigning some aspects of both the 16th Special Operations Wing and AFSOC, also headquartered at Hurlburt Field. This designation means that the base will receive new aircraft to replace the F-16s lost in the BRAC realignment. Jurisdiction was formally transferred to AFSOC on 1 October 2007 and new airframes such as the CV-22 Osprey and AC-130H Spectre were assigned to the new wing at Cannon.

In 2023, the FW1 Ute Reservoir pipeline project started construction to provide potable water by 2030 for Cannon Air Force Base and the communities of Clovis, Portales, Elida, Texico.

== Role and operations ==
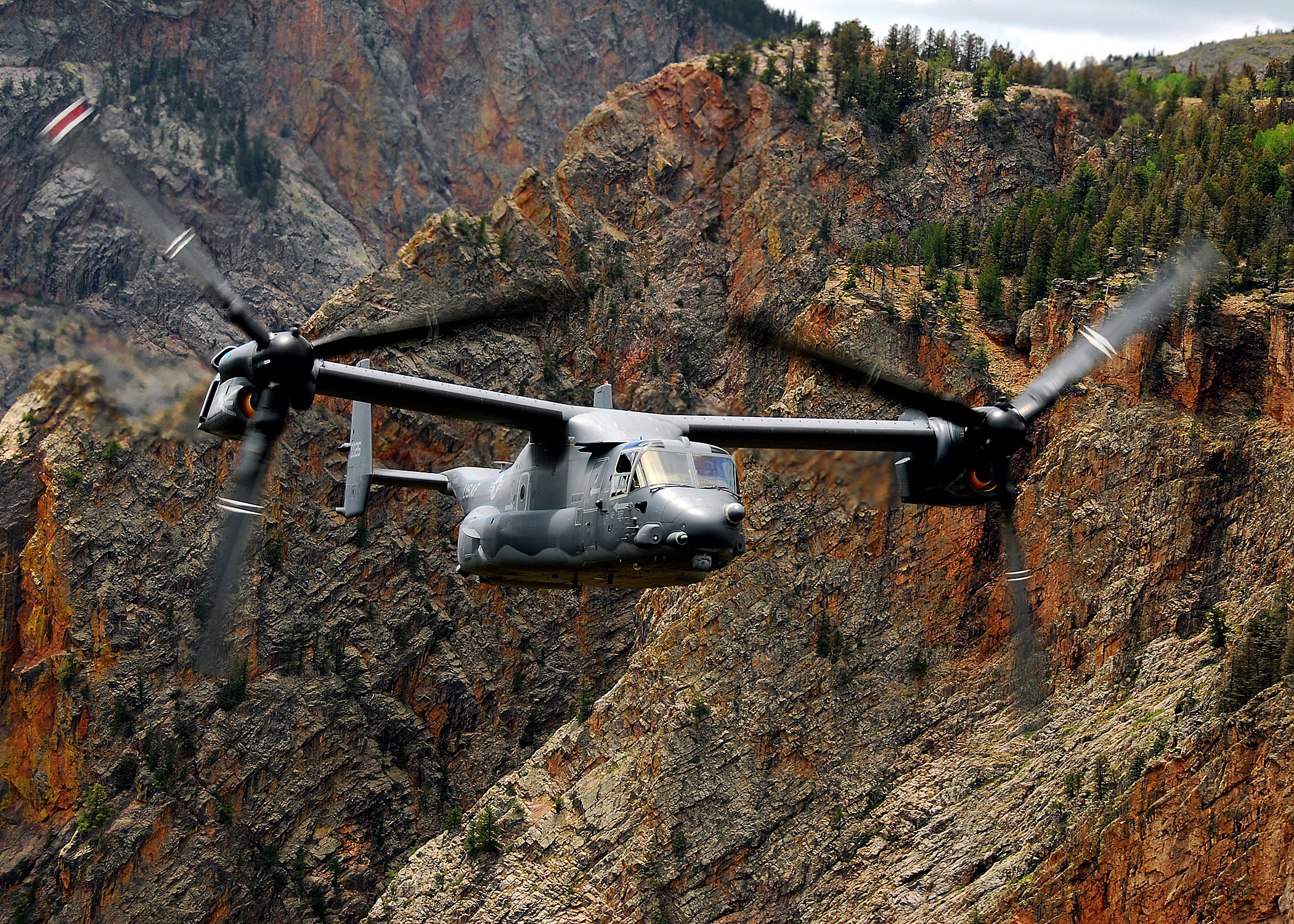
CV-22 Osprey of the 27th Operations Wing

Base units include:

- 27th Special Operations Group

One of four groups assigned to the 27th Special Operations Wing. The group accomplishes global special operations taskings as a USAF component member of the United States Special Operations Command. It conducts infiltration/ exfiltration, combat support, helicopter, and tilt-rotor aerial refueling, psychological warfare, and other special missions. It directs the deployment, employment, training, and planning for seven squadrons that operate the CV-22 Osprey, AC-130W Stinger II, MC-130J, MQ-1B Predator, MQ-9 Reaper, and various light and medium transport aviation.

- 27th Special Operations Maintenance Group

Composed of the 27th Special Operations Aircraft Maintenance Squadron, 27th Special Operations Component Maintenance Squadron, 27th Special Operations Equipment Maintenance Squadron and the 27th Special Operations Maintenance Operations Squadron. There is approximately 420 personnel assigned to the group. The 27 SOMXG vision of "The Power in Airpower!" is accomplished daily through innovation, teamwork, integrity and professionalism. The group supports the aircraft of the 27th Special Operations Wing through integrated maintenance support of the AFSOC mission. The 27 SOMXG maintains weapon systems, equipment and vehicles; sustains combat readiness; manages maintenance resources; and provides maintenance services. Most importantly, they prepare, support and execute contingency plans for worldwide mobilization, deployment and employment of wing aircraft.

- 27th Special Operations Mission Support Group

Provides base support and services activities to ensure mission readiness of the 27th Special Operations Wing, including housing, facility construction and maintenance, food service, law enforcement, fire protection, communications, personnel support, lodging, recreation, environmental management, contracting, supply, transportation, logistics plans and other base services.

- 27th Special Operations Medical Group

Provides base medical services activities to ensure mission readiness of the 27th Special Operations Wing.

== Based units ==
Flying and notable non-flying units based at Cannon Air Force Base.

Units marked GSU are Geographically Separate Units, which although based at Cannon, are subordinate to a parent unit based at another location.

=== Current United States Air Force ===
Air Force Special Operations Command (AFSOC)

- 27th Special Operations Wing (Host)
  - Headquarters 27th Special Operations Wing
    - 27th Special Operations Air Operations Squadron
    - 27th Special Operations Comptroller Squadron
    - 27th Special Operations Group
      - 3rd Special Operations Squadron – MQ-9A Reaper
      - 9th Special Operations Squadron – MC-130J Commando II
      - 12th Special Operations Squadron – MQ-9A Reaper
      - 16th Special Operations Squadron – AC-130J Ghostrider
      - 20th Special Operations Squadron – CV-22B Osprey
      - 27th Special Operations Support Squadron
      - 33rd Special Operations Squadron – MQ-9A Reaper
      - 56th Special Operations Intelligence Squadron
      - 318th Special Operations Squadron – U-28A
    - 27th Special Operations Mission Support Group
      - 27th Special Operations Civil Engineer Squadron
      - 27th Special Operations Communications Squadron
      - 27th Special Operations Contracting Squadron
      - 27th Special Operations Force Support Squadron
      - 27th Special Operations Logistics Readiness Squadron
      - 27th Special Operations Security Forces Squadron
    - 27th Special Operations Maintenance Group
      - 27th Special Operations Maintenance Squadron
      - 27th Special Operations Aircraft Maintenance Squadron
      - 27th Special Operations Munitions Squadron
      - 727th Special Operations Aircraft Maintenance Squadron
    - 27th Special Operations Medical Group
      - 27th Special Operations Health Care Operational Squadron
      - 27th Special Operations Operational Medical Readiness Squadron
      - 27th Special Operations Medical Support Squadron
- 24th Special Operations Wing
  - 720th Special Tactics Group
    - 26th Special Tactics Squadron (GSU)

Air Combat Command

- Sixteenth Air Force
  - 363rd Intelligence, Surveillance and Reconnaissance Wing
    - 361st Intelligence, Surveillance and Reconnaissance Group
      - 43rd Intelligence Squadron (GSU)

=== Previous operating units ===
- 409th Base HQ and Air Base Sq, 24 December 1942
- 234th AAF Base Unit, 25 March 1944 – 16 October 1947
- 509th Airdrome Gp, Clovis Det, 16 December 1947
- 234th AF Base Unit, 1 July 1948-c. April 1950
- 140th Air Base Gp, 1 October 1951
- 50th Air Base Gp, 1 January 1953
- 4445th Air Base Sq, 25 June 1953
- 388th Air Base Gp, 23 November 1953
- 312th Air Base Gp, 7 October 1954
- 832d Air Base Gp, 8 October 1957 (rdsgd 832d Combat Support Gp, 1 October 1962)
- 27th Combat Support Gp, 8 June 1969 (redsg 27th Mission Support Gp, 1 October 1992)-Present
- 11th Altitude Training Unit, 22 July 1943 – 1 April 1944
- 234th Army Air Force (later Air Force) Base Unit (later 4000 Base Services Sq), 1 April 1944 – 1 April 1950
- 301st Bombardment Group, 4 August 1946 – 16 July 1947
- 140th Fighter-Bomber Group (NM ANG), 5 July 1951 – 1 January 1963
- 50th Fighter-Bomber Wing, 1–23 July 1953
- 388th Fighter-Bomber Wing, 23 November 1953 – 28 November 1954
- 312th Fighter-Bomber Wing, 1 October 1954 – 18 February 1959
- 474th Fighter-Bomber Wing, 8 October 1957 – 20 January 1968
- 832d Air Division, 8 October 1957 – 1 July 1975

== Geography and demographics ==
According to the United States Census Bureau, the CDP portion of the base has a total area of 5.3 square miles (14 km^{2}), of which, 5.3 square miles (14 km^{2}) is land and 0.19% is water.

As of the census of 2000, there were 2,557 people, 921 households, and 575 families residing on the base. The population density was 481.8 people per square mile (186.0 people/km^{2}). There were 1,087 housing units at an average density of 204.8 per square mile (79.1/km^{2}). The racial makeup of the residents was 68.0% White, 13.3% African American, 0.7% Native American, 5.7% Asian, 0.3% Pacific Islander, 6.1% from other races, and 5.9% from two or more races. 12.1% of the population were Hispanic or Latino of any race.

There were 921 households, out of which 37.5% had children under the age of 18 living with them, 56.9% were married couples living together, 4.2% had a female householder with no husband present, and 37.5% were non-families. 37.4% of all households were made up of individuals, and 0.0% had someone living alone who was 65 years of age or older. The average household size was 2.16 and the average family size was 2.82.

On the base the population was spread out, with 20.2% under the age of 18, 52.8% from 18 to 24, 26.2% from 25 to 44, 0.8% from 45 to 64, and 0.0% who were 65 years of age or older. The median age was 22 years. For every 100 females, there were 153.4 males. For every 100 females age 18 and over, there were 171.4 males.

The median income for a household on the base was $18,465, and the median income for a family was $25,573. Males had a median income of $15,546 versus $14,635 for females. The per capita income for the base was $11,562. 12.0% of the population and 11.5% of families were below the poverty line, including 14.0% of those under the age of 18 and 0.0% of those 65 and older.

== Environmental contamination ==
In 2021 the Air Force was looking to see if the community was interested in establishing a Restoration Advisory Board at the Cannon Air Force Base to discuss Air Force environmental restoration activities, especially given Per- and polyfluoroalkyl substances contamination. The commander concluded there was not enough interest in forming a RAB, as only 4 people were willing to serve.

== See also ==
- List of United States Air Force installations
- New Mexico World War II Army Airfields

== Other sources ==
- This article incorporates public domain material from the Air Force Historical Research Agency
- This article incorporates public domain material from Cannon Air Force Base. United States Air Force.
- Maurer, Maurer. Air Force Combat Units of World War II. Washington, DC: U.S. Government Printing Office 1961 (republished 1983, Office of Air Force History, ISBN 0-912799-02-1).
- Ravenstein, Charles A. Air Force Combat Wings Lineage and Honors Histories 1947–1977. Maxwell Air Force Base, Alabama: Office of Air Force History 1984. ISBN 0-912799-12-9.
- Mueller, Robert, Air Force Bases Volume I, Active Air Force Bases Within the United States of America on 17 September 1982, Office of Air Force History, 1989
- Active Air Force Bases Within the United States of America on 17 September 1982 USAF Reference Series, Office of Air Force History, United States Air Force, Washington, D.C., 1989
- Baugher, Joe. USAAS-USAAC-USAAF-USAF Aircraft Serial Numbers—1908 to present. USAAS-USAAC-USAAF-USAF Aircraft Serial Numbers—1908 to present
- Martin, Patrick, Tail Code: The Complete History of USAF Tactical Aircraft Tail Code Markings, 1994
- Menard, David W. USAF Plus Fifteen – A Photo History 1947 – 1962. Lancaster, PA: Schiffere Books,1993. ISBN 0-88740-483-9.
- Rogers, Brian, United States Air Force Unit Designations Since 1978, 2005
