= 19th Intelligence Squadron =

- Active: 2007-present
- Country: United States
- Branch: United States Air Force
- Role: Intelligence
- Part of: 361st ISR Group
- Garrison/HQ: Pope AAF, NC
- Anniversaries: 14 May 2007

Commanders
- Current commander: Major Nate Smith
- Ceremonial chief: Liam O’Neill
- Colonel of the Regiment: Colonel Richard R. Kovsky
- Commander: Captain Hayden Small

The United States Air Force's 19th Intelligence Squadron (19th IS) is an intelligence unit located at Pope Air Force Base, North Carolina. The 19th IS is associated with United States Army airborne and ground operations.

== Mission ==
The mission of the 19th Intelligence Squadron is to provide knowledge and communications expertise to develop realistic training scenarios for special operations forces' tactics, techniques and procedures validation.

== Previous designations ==
- 19th Intelligence Squadron (14 May 2007 – present)

== Assignments ==
=== Major command/field operating agency ===
- Air Combat Command (29 Sep 2014 – present)
- Air Force Intelligence, Surveillance and Reconnaissance Agency (14 May 2007 – 29 Sep 2014)

=== Wings/groups ===
- 361st Intelligence, Surveillance and Reconnaissance Group (29 October 2008 – present)

== Bases stationed ==
- Pope Army Air Field, North Carolina (???-present)
