= 306th Intelligence Squadron =

U.S. air force intelligence unit

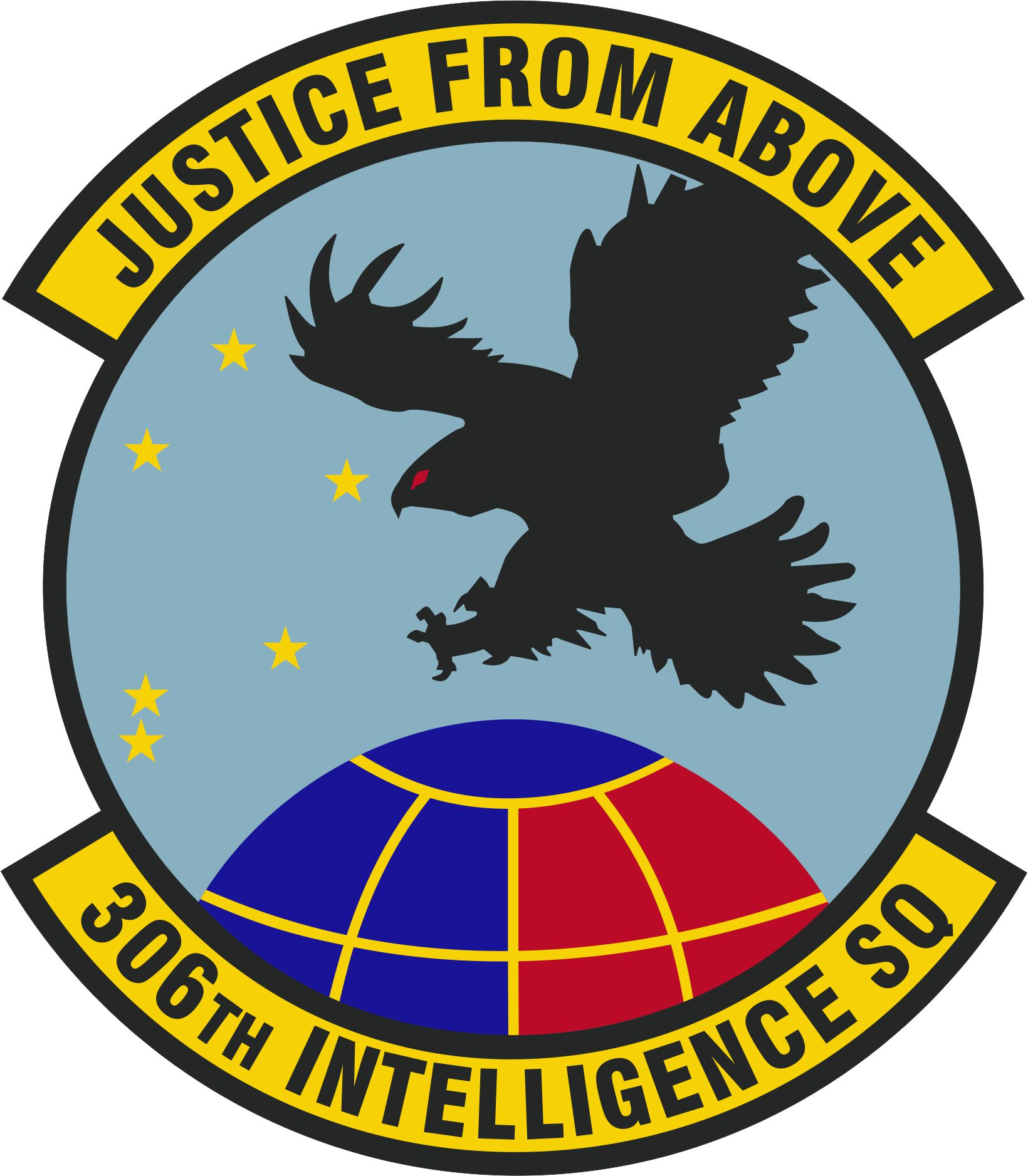
- Active: 5 October 2012 - Present (as 306th Intelligence Squadron) 1953 - ? (as 6306 Reconnaissance Technical Flight)
- Country: United States of America
- Branch: United States Air Force
- Type: Active Duty Intelligence Squadron
- Motto(s): Justice From Above
- Mascot(s): Firebird

The United States Air Force's 306th Intelligence Squadron (306 IS) is an intelligence unit located at Will Rogers Air National Guard Base, Oklahoma. It oversees advanced technical training and initial qualification of airborne intelligence operators preparing to support Air Force Special Operations Command (AFSOC).

== Mission ==
The 306 Intelligence Squadron trains and qualifies Airborne Cryptologic Operators to execute Special Operations missions worldwide.

== History ==
The 306 IS was originally activated on 5 October 2012 to support Air Combat Command's (ACC) then-new MC-12W Liberty Intelligence, Surveillance, and Reconnaissance aircraft. As the unit grew in strength and technical expertise, it also became responsible for an advanced portion of the initial training for many airborne intelligence operators prior to either remaining at Beale AFB or proceeding to a follow-on assignment to support Air Force Special Operations Command (AFSOC). Eventually, ACC drew the MC-12W program to a close and relocated the aircraft, transferring them to either the U.S. Army or U.S. Special Operations Command. On 6 March 2017, the 306 IS officially relocated to Will Rogers Air National Guard Base, Oklahoma, expanding its training mission to encompass all airborne intelligence operators supporting AFSOC aircraft and reuniting with the MC-12W Liberty aircraft based there under the 137th Special Operations Wing.

== Previous designations ==
- 6306 Reconnaissance Technical Flight; 1953 – ?
- 306th Intelligence Squadron; 5 October 2012 – Present

== Assignments ==
=== Major command/field operating agency ===
- Air Combat Command (29 September 2014 – present)
- Air Force Intelligence, Surveillance, and Reconnaissance Agency (5 October 2012 – 29 September 2014)

=== NAF/Wings/Groups ===
- 16th Air Force (2019 - present)
- 363d Intelligence, Surveillance and Reconnaissance Wing (2015 – present)
- 361st Intelligence, Surveillance and Reconnaissance Group (2012 – present)

== Bases stationed ==
- Beale Air Force Base, California (2012 – 2017)
- Will Rogers Air National Guard Base, Oklahoma (2017 – present)

== Decorations ==
Award streamer	Award	Dates	Notes
	Air Force Outstanding Unit Award	1 January 2012 - 31 December 2012	306th Intelligence Squadron
	Air Force Meritorious Unit Award	1 January 2013 - 31 December 2013	306th Intelligence Squadron
