= 27th Special Operations Wing =

US Air Force unit

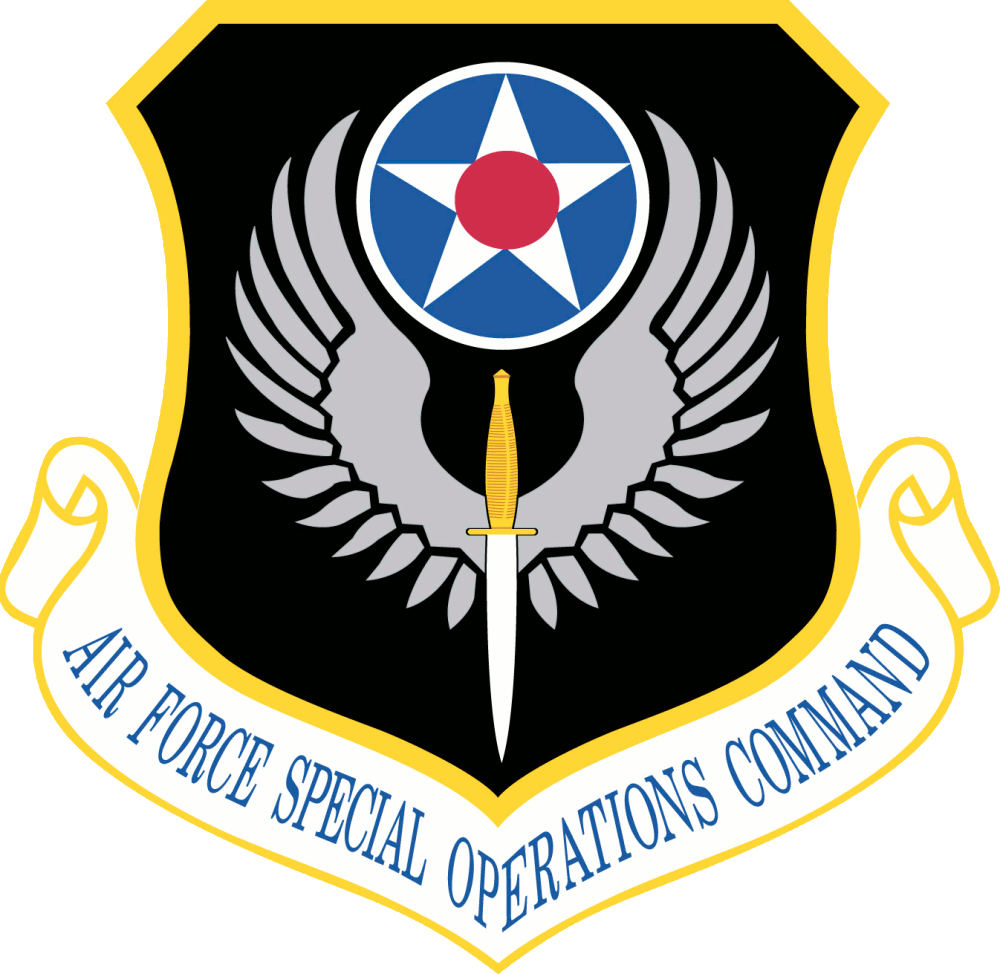
27th Special Operations Wing

- Units, people and aircraft of the 27th Special Operations Wing
- Active: 1947–1948; 1948–present
- Country: United States
- Branch: United States Air Force
- Role: Special Operations
- Size: 4,853 personnel authorized: 4,430 military personnel; 423 civilian personnel
- Part of: Air Force Special Operations Command
- Garrison/HQ: Cannon Air Force Base
- Nickname: The Steadfast Line
- Motto: Intelligent Strength
- Engagements: Korean War
- Decorations: Distinguished Unit Citation Air Force Outstanding Unit Award Philippine Presidential Unit Citation Republic of Korea Presidential Unit Citation

Commanders
- Current commander: Colonel Brett Cassidy
- Vice Commander: Colonel Jonathan N. Ball
- Command Chief: Command Chief Master Sergeant Thomas J. Gunnell
- Notable commanders: Donald Blakeslee; Lance L. Smith

Insignia
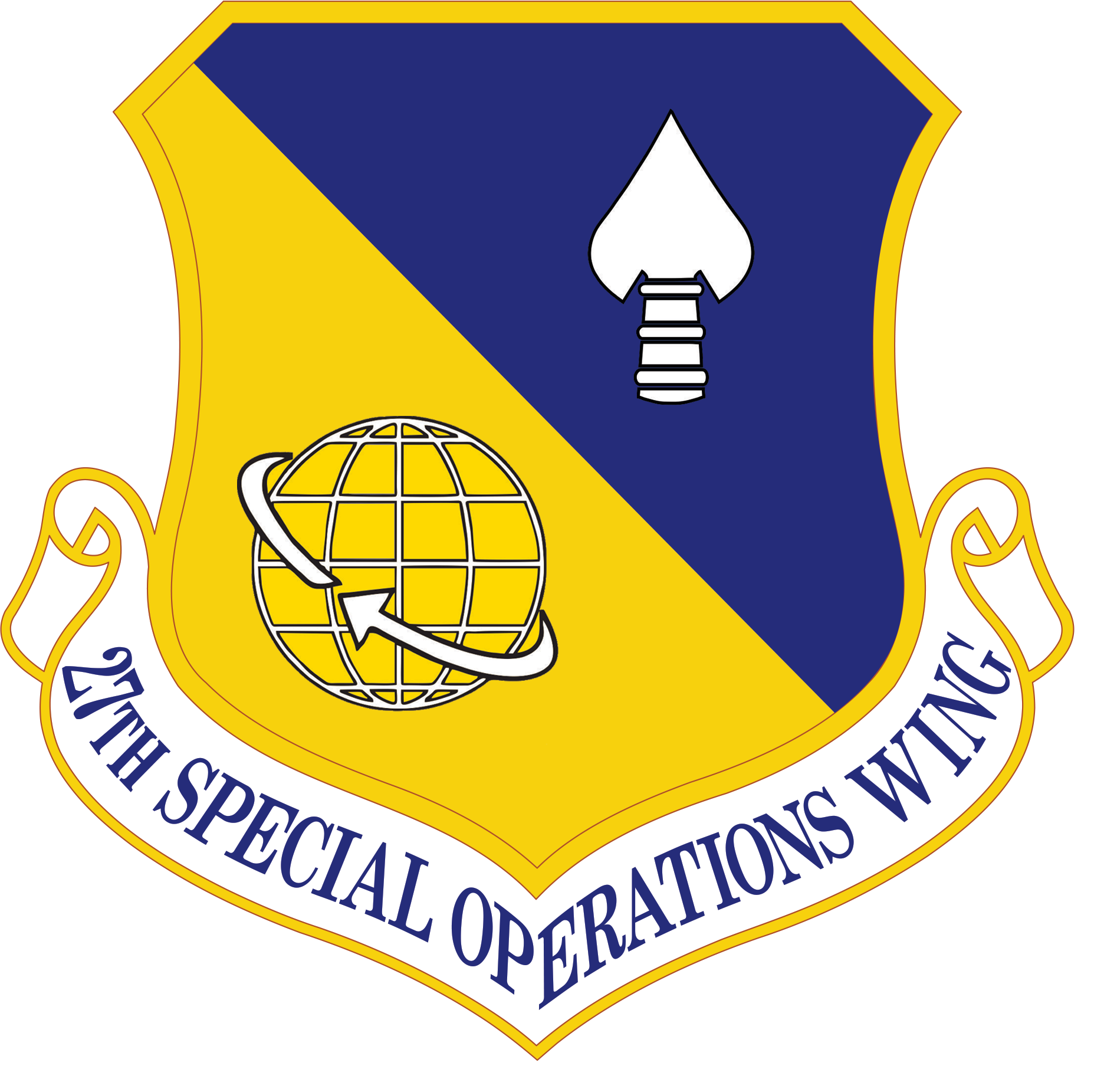
- 27th Special Operations Wing emblem (Note: Approved 12 May 2023.)

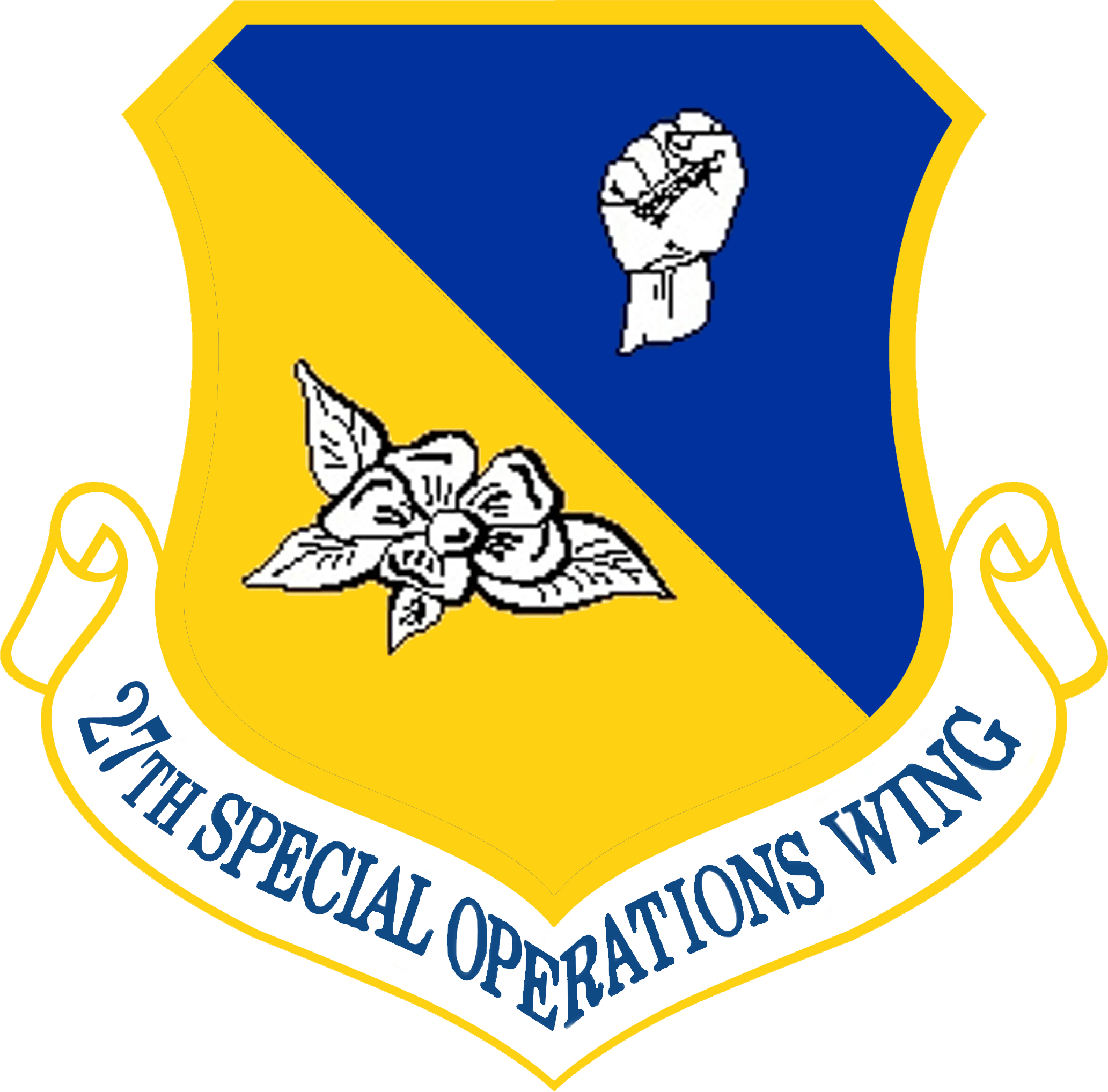
- 27th Fighter-Escort Wing emblem (Note: Approved 11 July 1952. Description: Per bend azure and or, in sinister chief a right hand clenched fist couped at the wrist, in dexter base a magnolia blossom leaved all argent, fimbriated sable.)

The 27th Special Operations Wing, also known as "The Steadfast Line", is a wing of the United States Air Force stationed at Cannon Air Force Base, New Mexico. It is assigned to the Air Force Special Operations Command (AFSOC).

The wing mission includes infiltration, exfiltration and resupply of special operations forces; air refueling of special operations rotary wing and tiltrotor aircraft; and precision fire support. These capabilities support a variety of special operations missions including direct action, unconventional warfare, special reconnaissance, counter-terrorism, personnel recovery, psychological operations, and information operations.

The wing also is responsible for the Melrose Range, an air training range near the neighboring town of Melrose, New Mexico.

The commander of the 27th Special Operations Wing is Colonel Brett Cassidy. The command chief is Chief Master Sergeant Thomas J. Gunnell.

== Organization ==
- Wing Staff Agencies
  - 27th Special Operations Air Operations Squadron
  - 27th Special Operations Comptroller Squadron
- 27th Special Operations Group (27 SOG)
  - 27th Special Operations Support Squadron (27 SOSS)
  - 3rd Special Operations Squadron (3 SOS), MQ-9 Reaper
  - 6th Special Operations Squadron (6 SOS), MC-130J Commando II
  - 9th Special Operations Squadron (9 SOS), MC-130J Commando II
  - 12th Special Operations Squadron (12 SOS), MQ-9 Reaper launch and recovery
  - 16th Special Operations Squadron (16 SOS), AC-130J Ghostrider
  - 20th Special Operations Squadron (20 SOS), CV-22B Osprey
  - 33rd Special Operations Squadron (33 SOS), MQ-9 Reaper
  - 56th Special Operations Intelligence Squadron (56 SOIS)
  - 310th Special Operations Squadron (310 SOS), U-28A Draco
  - 318th Special Operations Squadron (318 SOS), U-28A Draco
- 27th Special Operations Mission Support Group (27 SOMSG)
  - 27th Special Operations Logistics Readiness Squadron
  - 27th Special Operations Force Support Squadron
  - 27th Special Operations Civil Engineer Squadron
  - 27th Special Operations Contracting Squadron
  - 27th Special Operations Security Forces Squadron
  - 27th Special Operations Communications Squadron
- 27th Special Operations Maintenance Group (27 SOMXG)
  - 27th Special Operations Maintenance Group, Detachment 2 (6th AMU)
  - 27th Special Operations Maintenance Squadron (27 SOMXS)
  - 9th Special Operations Aircraft Maintenance Squadron (9 SOAMXS), (9th AMU)
  - 16th Special Operations Aircraft Maintenance Squadron (16 SOAMXS), (16th AMU)
  - 20th Special Operations Aircraft Maintenance Squadron (20 SOAMXS), (12th AMU and 20th AMU)
  - 27th Special Operations Munitions Squadron (27 SOMUNS)
- 27th Special Operations Medical Group (27 SOMDG)
  - 27th Special Operations Medical Operations Squadron
  - 27th Special Operations Aerospace Medicine Squadron
  - 27th Special Operations Medical Support Squadron

== History ==
See 27th Special Operations Group for related history and lineage information

== The Steadfast Line ==
On 1 February 1940, the United States Army Air Corps activated the 27th Bombardment Group (Light) at Barksdale Army Airfield, Louisiana and equipped it with the Douglas B-18 Bolo Light bomber aircraft. The group consisted of the 15th, 16th and 17th Bombardment Squadrons. In October 1941 the group moved to Hunter Army Airfield, Georgia, less the 15th Bombardment Squadron, which was reassigned to V Air Support Command on 14 October. On 21 October 1941 the group was ordered to the Philippine Islands in response to the growing crisis in the Pacific.

Arriving at Fort William McKinley in the Philippines on 20 November, the 27th BG (L) readied itself for delivery of its A-24 Banshee aircraft. Concern grew as days turned into weeks and still the planes had not arrived. When the Imperial Japanese Army attacked the Philippines on 9 December 1941, the situation had not changed. Unknown to the 27th BG (L) Airmen, to avoid capture or destruction, the ship carrying the planes was diverted to Australia when the war escalated.

The ground echelon of the 27th still in the Philippines was evacuated south from Luzon on 25 December to the Bataan Peninsula, arriving to form the 2nd Battalion (27th Bombardment Group) Provisional Infantry Regiment (Air Corp). For the 99 days following the attack on Pearl Harbor until their surrender to the Japanese after the Battle of Bataan, the men of the 27th BG became the only Air Force unit in history to fight as an infantry regiment, and earned the moniker "The Steadfast Line" as a result of the tenacious defensive fighting effort. After surrendering, they were forced to endure the infamous Bataan Death March. Of the 880 or so Airmen who were taken, less than half survived captivity.

=== Postwar era ===
Established as the 27th Fighter Wing on 28 July 1947 at Kearney Army Air Field, Nebraska with the 27th Fighter Group as its operational component. The operational squadrons of the 27th were the 522d, 523d and 524th Fighter Squadrons.

The 27th was initially equipped with the North American P-51D Mustang, and in 1948 was upgraded to the new North American F-82E Twin Mustang. In June 1948 the designation "P" for pursuit was changed to "F" for fighter. Subsequently, all P-51s were redesignated F-51s. The mission of the 27th Fighter Wing was to fly long-range escort missions for SAC Boeing B-29 Superfortress bombers. With the arrival of the F-82s, the older F-51s were sent to Air National Guard units.

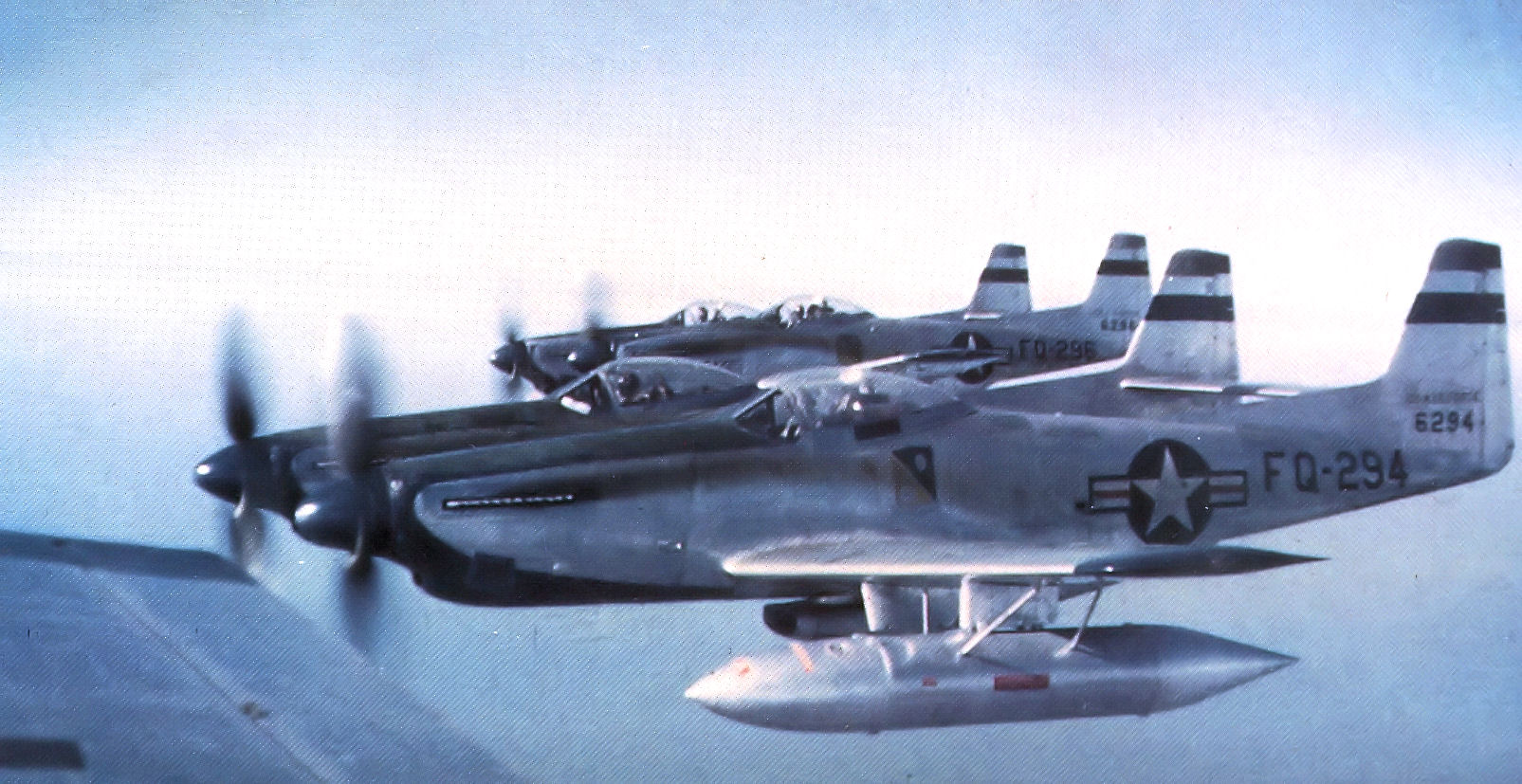
F-82Es 46-294 and 46-296 about 1948 with external tanks

The first production F-82Es reached the 27th in early 1948, and almost immediately the group was deployed to McChord Air Force Base, Washington, in June where its squadrons stood on alert on a secondary air defense mission due to heightened tensions over the Berlin Airlift. It was also believed that the 27th would launch an escort mission, presumably to the Soviet Union, if conflict broke out in Europe. From McChord, the group flew its Twin Mustangs on weather reconnaissance missions over the northwest Pacific, but problems were encountered with their fuel tanks. Decommissioned F-61 Black Widow external tanks were found at Hamilton AFB, California that could be modified for the F-82 which were fitted on the pylons of the Twin Mustang that solved the problem. With a reduction in tensions, the 27th returned to its home base in Nebraska during September where the unit settled down to transition flying with their aircraft.

Four F-82s were deployed to Alaska from McChord where the pilots provided transition training to the 449th Fighter (All Weather) Squadron which used Twin Mustangs in the air defense mission. They remained in Alaska for about 45 days, returning to rejoin the rest of the group at the beginning of November 1948.

In January 1949, Eighth Air Force planned a large celebration at Carswell Air Force Base. All of its assigned units were to participate in a coordinated flyover. Most of SAC's bombers were to participate, along with SAC's only "long range" fighter group, the 27th. The weather in Nebraska in January that year was especially horrible, with most airports in the Midwest weathered in the day of the display. At Kearney, the base was socked-in with a blizzard. Nevertheless, the crews had an early morning mission briefing, the aircraft in the hangars were preflighted and prepared for the flyover mission. Paths were cut though the snow for the aircraft to taxi and somehow the F-82s got airborne, with the 27th's Twin Mustangs joining up with SAC bombers over Oklahoma on schedule. The flyover by the Twin Mustangs was a tremendous success, with SAC leadership being amazed that the F-82 was truly an "all weather" aircraft and the 27th being able to carry out their mission despite the weather.

In early 1949, the 27th began carrying out long-range escort profile missions. Flights to Puerto Rico, Mexico, the Bahamas and nonstop to Washington D.C were carried out. For President Truman's 1949 inauguration, the 27th FEW launched 48 aircraft to fly in review, along with several other fighter units, in formation down Pennsylvania Avenue. Another flyover over the newly -dedicated Idlewild Airport in New York City soon followed, with the aircraft flying non-stop from Kearney.

With the tight defense budgets in the late 1940s, the decision was made by Strategic Air Command decided to close Kearney in 1949. The 27th Fighter Wing was transferred to Bergstrom Air Force Base Texas on 16 March.

At Bergstrom, the 27th transitioned to jet aircraft with Republic F-84E Thunderjet in 1950, and was redesignated the 27th Fighter-Escort Wing on 1 February. The wing won the Mackay Trophy for successful deployment of 90 F-84s from Bergstrom to Fürstenfeldbruck Air Base West Germany, in September 1950, via Labrador, Greenland, Iceland, and England. This was the second (the first being the 20th Fighter Group flying 64 F-84Ds on 20 July 1950 during Operation Ready from Shaw Air Force Base, South Carolina to RAF Manston, United Kingdom) long-range mass flight of jet aircraft in aviation history.

=== Korean War ===
See 27th Fighter-Escort Group for more information about the wing's combat duties during the Korean War

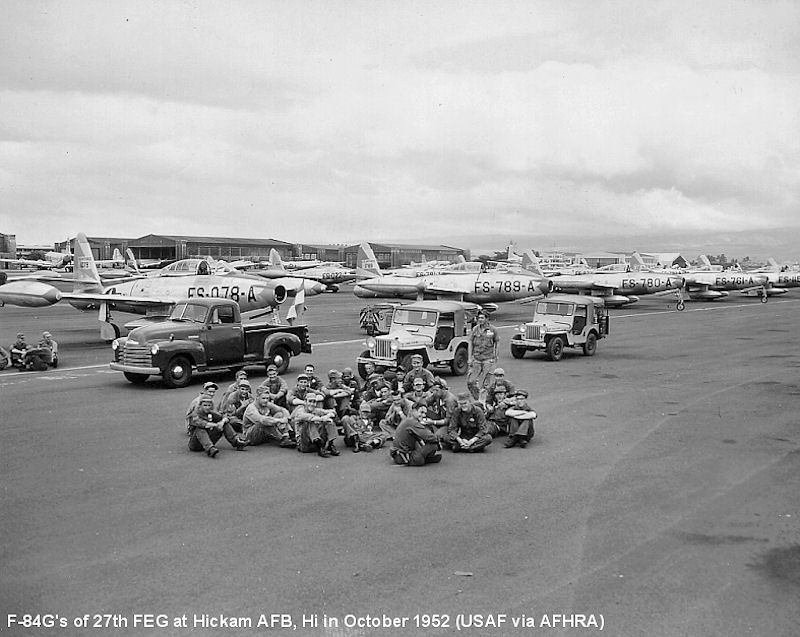
: 27th Fighter-Escort Wing F-84Gs at Hickam AFB, October 1952.

The Korean War began in June 1950 and by November the wing was transferred with the advance echelon landing at Taegu Air Base, South Korea on 5 December and the rear echelon at Itazuke AB, Japan on 1 December. Combat operations in support of the United Nations Command ground forces began immediately and continued after the advance echelon was transferred to Itazuke in late January 1951.

The 27th Fighter Escort Wing was one of the first F-84 units to see combat action in Korea and earned numerous honors and awards for their combat record during the war. The 27th flew missions in support of ground forces, earning another DUC for missions between 26 January and 21 April 1951. Among these missions was close support of the largest paratroop landing and escort for Boeing B-29 Superfortress bombers on raids over North Korea, including air-to-air combat with enemy MiG-15 fighters.

For its Korean War service, the 27th Fighter-Escort Wing received the Distinguished Unit Citation, covering the period of 26 January through 21 April 1951, for their actions in Korea.

The 27th was relieved of its duties supporting U.N. forces in Korea and returned to Bergstrom on 31 July 1951. Re-equipped with F-84G Thunderjets, the wing redeployed to Misawa Air Base, Japan, for a tour in providing air defense of the Japanese home islands. This mission made stops at Travis Air Force Base, California; Hickam Air Force Base, Hawaii, and Midway Island. At Misawa, the 27th relieved the 31st Fighter-Escort Wing which had been performing the air defense mission. The 27th was itself relieved at Misawa on 13 February 1953 by the 508th Strategic Fighter Wing and returned to Bergstrom where they were re-equipped with new Republic F-84F Thunderstreaks.

=== Cold War ===
On 20 January 1953 the wing was redesignated as the 27th Strategic Fighter Wing. From June 1953 – June 1957 the 27th had air refueling as an additional mission, with the 27th Air Refueling Squadron flying the Boeing KB-29 Superfortress tanker.

Wing pilot Capt Forrest W. Wilson, in an F-84G, won the Allison Trophy jet aircraft race of the National Aircraft Show at Dayton, Ohio, on 6 September 1953, flying the 110.3-mile course at an average speed of 537.802 mph in 12:17.2 minutes.

Due to the phasing out of the B-50 and B-36 and the arrival of the B-47 Stratojet and B-52 Stratofortress into the SAC inventory, SAC began to phase out its strategic fighter program in 1956. It was felt that the long-range fighter escorts were no longer necessary for the new fast jet bombers. On 1 July 1957, the 27th was redesignated the 27th Fighter-Bomber Wing and was assigned to Tactical Air Command along with Bergstrom.

Under TAC, the Wing was assigned to the Twelfth Air Force was re-equipped with the new McDonnell F-101A Voodoo. Consisting of the 481st, 522d, and 523d Fighter-Bomber squadrons, the mission of the 27th FBW was to deliver a centerline nuclear bomb to a target. The F-101A was capable of little else and although designated as a fighter aircraft, it had poor aerial combat capabilities and would not have fared well in any air-to-air combat against enemy aircraft. Maj Adrian E. Drew, wing F-101 project officer, broke the world speed record on 12 December 1957 when he flew an F-101A over a Mojave Desert course at 1,212.8 mph in one direction and 1,207.5 mph in the opposite direction.

HQ USAF redesignated the wing the 27th Tactical Fighter Wing on 1 July 1958 as part of a worldwide naming change. On 18 February 1959, the 27th was inactivated, as SAC reacquired Bergstrom as a B-52/KC-135 base. The 27th was immediately transferred and reactivated at Cannon Air Force Base, New Mexico, being equipped with the North American F-100 Super Sabre, replacing the 312th Tactical Fighter Wing.

=== Vietnam War ===
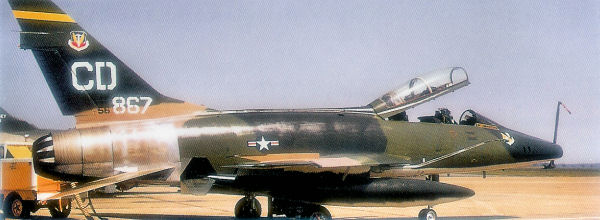
North American F-100F-10-NA Super Sabre Serial 56-3867 of the 524th TFS in Vietnam-Era camouflage.

During the Vietnam War, the 27th TFW deployed individual F-100 squadrons to Southeast Asia, which included Thailand, Vietnam and the Philippines.

Units from Cannon deployed the first F-100 squadron to Thailand in 1962–1963, and South Vietnam in 1964. Beginning in 1964 and throughout the Vietnam War years squadrons from the 27th TFW were deployed and detached to Air Force units and bases around the world. The 27th did not recombine as a cohesive wing until 1973.

In December 1965, with most of its operational squadrons deployed, the mission of the 27th changed from a Tactical Fighter Wing to a replacement training unit. The 27th Tactical Fighter Wing became the largest such unit in TAC. The 4585th Student Squadron was initially activated on 1 January 1966 to perform this mission. Later, the 4429th Combat Crew Training Squadron was organized on 15 May 1968 as a second training squadron, replacing the deployed 523d TFS.

Many F-100 pilots that flew in the Vietnam War trained at Cannon. From Cannon, the aircrews were transferred to the F-100 bases in South Vietnam – Phù Cát Air Base (37th TFW); Phan Rang Air Base (35th TFW) and Tuy Hoa Air Base (31st TFW).

The 27th also trained forward air controllers (FACs) and air liaison officers (ALOs) in Lockheed T-33 Shooting Stars from 1969 to 1976. The 4468 Tac Control Squadron initially performed this mission. In 1969, the 4468th was replaced by the '609th Tactical Control Squadron. The 609th operated the Westinghouse AN/TPS-43 long-range, air surveillance radar as its primary mission equipment. The AN/TPS-43 is a transportable 3-dimensional air search radar produced in the United States originally by Westinghouse Defense and Electronic Division, which was later purchased by Northrop Grumman. The 609th was inactivated on 15 June 1976.

=== Post-Vietnam era ===
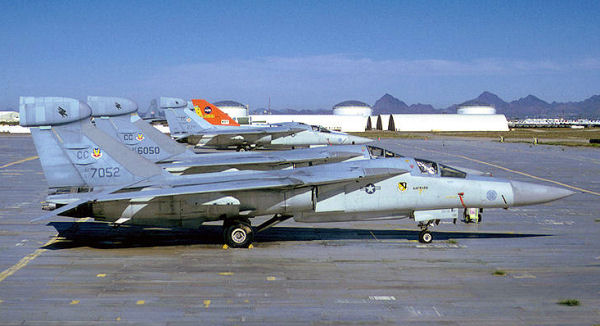
429th ECS General Dynamics EF-111A Ravens being retired at Davis-Monthan AFB Arizona upon arrival at AMARC, 1 April 1988. Serials 67-052 and 66-050 identifiable.

With the withdrawal of the F-100 from Vietnam in 1970, and the phaseout of the aircraft from the active Air Force inventory, the 27th TFW began conversion to the General Dynamics F-111D "Aardvark".

In July 1969, on loan from Nellis AFB Nevada, 10 F-111As facilitated training while the wing waited for its own planes. F-111Es began arriving in October 1969, but their stay was short. In the summer of 1971 wing aircrews ferried the last of them to RAF Upper Heyford England. In 1971, the 27th TFW received the first of its F-111Ds, and in July 1972, the last operational active duty Air Force F-100s were transferred from the 27th TFW to the Air National Guard.

The mission of the 27th TFW expanded in 1988 as a result of decisions made by the Defense Department Base Realignment and Closure Commission (BRAC) when the 27th was equipped with the F-111G. (The "G" model was a conversion of the SAC FB-111A all-weather strategic bombing version of the F-111, which was originally intended as an interim successor to the Boeing B-52 Stratofortress and Convair B-58 Hustler.) These aircraft, less their nuclear delivery capability, were transferred to Cannon following the disbandment of SAC's 509th Bomb Wing at Pease AFB New Hampshire and the 380th Bomb Wing at Plattsburgh AFB, New York.

The F-111Gs were used primarily for training, but was scheduled to be supplanted in the training role by the F-111E. This made the F-111G surplus to USAF requirements, and the F-111G began to be transferred to AMARC for storage in 1991 with the arrival of the "E" models with the 428th Tactical Fighter Training Squadron. The last G model was sent to AMARC in 1993.

Personnel of the 27th TFW played a role during Operation Desert Shield/Storm. Aircrews and aircraft of the 27th did not deploy to the region, but support personnel and a combat support group element of the wing's 27th Combat Support Group, commanded by Colonel David Benson, deployed to Taif. On 16 January 1991, when the U.S. led coalition force initiated the Desert Storm air campaign against Iraq, the 27th TFW had 325 personnel serving in the Persian Gulf region in combat support roles.

=== 1990s to today ===
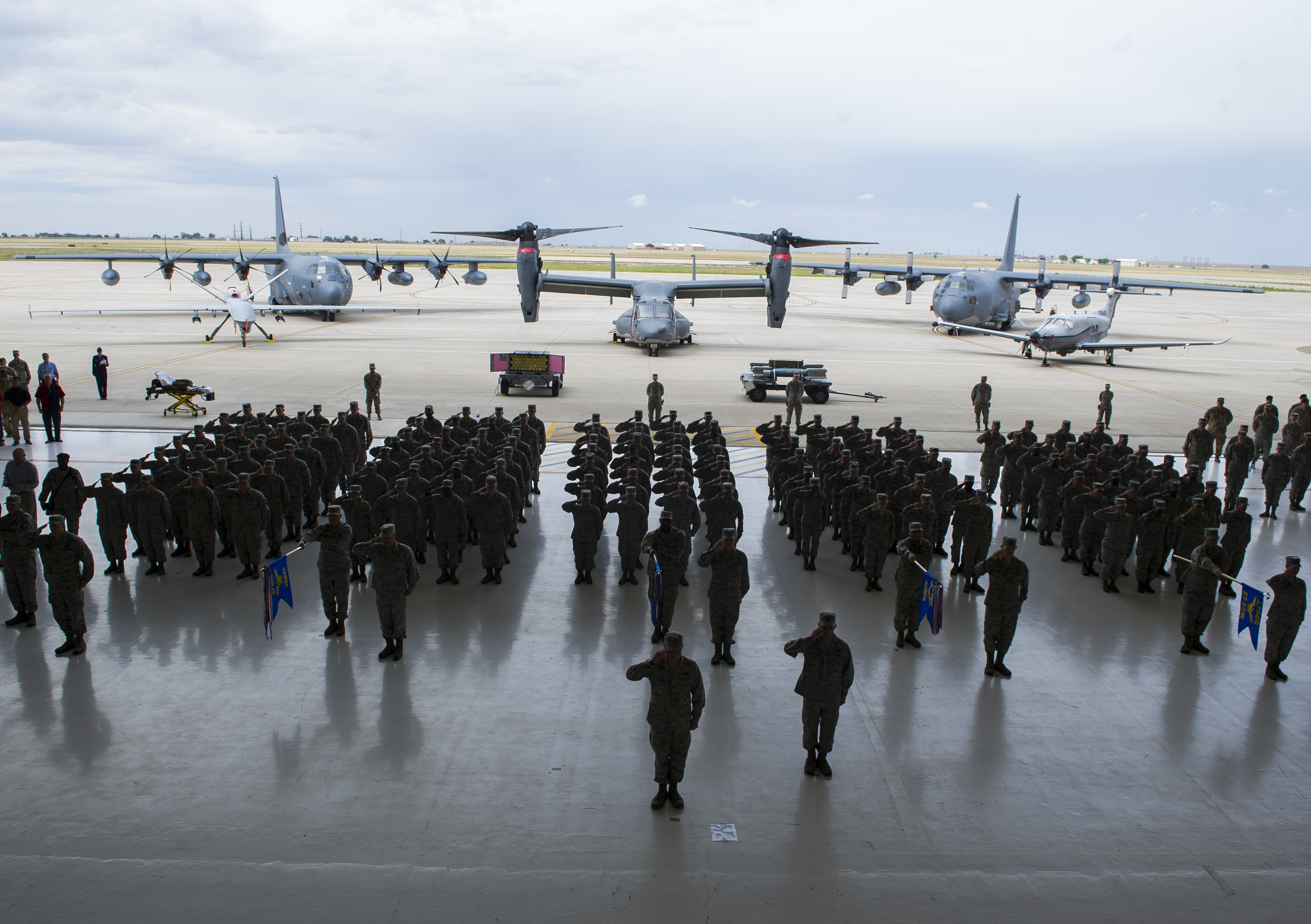
U.S. Airmen render a salute for the posting of the colors during the 27th Special Operations Wing's change of command ceremony at Cannon Air Force Base, New Mexico, 2 June 2017.

On 1 November 1991, the 27 TFW was re-designated the 27th Fighter Wing as part of an Air Force-wide reorganization. As part of the implementation of the "Objective Wing" concept adapted by the Air Force The 27th Operations Group was bestowed the lineage, honors and history of its predecessor history and honors of the 27 Tactical Fighter Group and its predecessor units. The 27 OG took control of the wing's fighter squadrons upon activation.

In June 1992, the 27 FW became part of a new major command – Air Combat Command. ACC was created when SAC, TAC, and the Military Airlift Command merged to form two commands, ACC and the Air Mobility Command.

Following the September 11 terrorist attacks, the wing deployed personnel and aircraft globally for the beginning of the War in Afghanistan (2001-2021). On 11 September 2001, aircraft from 522d FS, 523d FS and 524th FS entered alert status. Less than two weeks after the 9/11 attacks, the 27 Civil Engineer Squadron deployed members to build a bare base in direct support of Operation Infinite Justice (later changed to Operation Enduring Freedom) as one of the first units deployed to the area of operations. In December 2002, the 524 FS deployed to Kuwait and participated in the 2003 invasion of Iraq, dropping nearly a million pounds of precision guided munitions, more than any other F-16 Block 40 squadron in history.

On 13 May 2005, the 2005 Base Realignment and Closure Commission recommended that Cannon Air Force Base be closed. However, on 25 August 2005, the BRAC Commission overturned the recommendation that Cannon AFB be closed, but upheld the withdrawal of the base's F-16 fighter aircraft. The Air Force had until 31 December 2009 to come up with a new use for Cannon AFB, otherwise the base would be closed in 2010. Cannon AFB attempted to reopen a rejected EIS alternative, by substituting an Environmental Assessment. Comments were accepted through 4 October 2010.

On 20 June 2006, it was announced that Cannon would transfer from Air Combat Command to Air Force Special Operations Command. Initial word was that the 16th Special Operations Wing would transfer from Hurlburt Field, Florida. However, it was later decided that the 27th Fighter Wing would transfer from ACC to AFSOC and become the 27th Special Operations Wing. This action entailed expanding and realigning aspects of both the 16th Special Operations Wing and Air Force Special Operations Command, also headquartered at Hurlburt Field. This designation meant that the base would receive new aircraft to replace the F-16s lost in the BRAC realignment. Jurisdiction was formally transferred to AFSOC on 1 October 2007.

New airframes, including the CV-22A Osprey, were assigned to the 27 SOW at Cannon. Other aircraft included the AC-130H Spectre gunship, the MC-130J Commando II, the PC-12, the C-146A and various remotely piloted aircraft (RPA).

== Lineage ==
- Established as the 27th Fighter Wing on 28 July 1947 (Table of Distribution unit)

Organized on 15 August 1947
Discontinued on 1 August 1948
Activated on 1 August 1948 (Table of Organization unit)
Redesignated: 27th Fighter-Escort Wing on 1 February 1950
Redesignated: 27th Strategic Fighter Wing on 20 January 1953
Redesignated: 27th Fighter-Bomber Wing on 1 July 1957
Redesignated: 27th Tactical Fighter Wing on 1 July 1958
Redesignated: 27th Fighter Wing on 1 October 1991
Redesignated: 27th Special Operations Wing on 1 October 2007

=== Assignments ===
- Eighth Air Force, 15 August 1947 (attached to Far East Air Forces, 19–29 November 1950, Fifth Air Force, until 15 July 1951)
- 42d Air Division, 6 August 1951 (attached to Far East Air Forces, 6–13 October 1952, 39th Air Division, 13 October 1952 – c. 13 February 1953, 7th Air Division, 7 May – 17 August 1955)
- Twelfth Air Force, 8 January 1958 (attached to 834th Air Division after 15 July 1958)
- 832d Air Division, 18 February 1959 (attached to 3d Air Division (Provisional), 21 October – 1 December 1962)
- Twelfth Air Force, 1 July 1975
- Eighth Air Force, 1 June 1992
- Twelfth Air Force, 1 October 2002
- Air Force Special Operations Command, 1 October 2007 – present

=== Components ===
Wing

- 136th Fighter-Bomber Wing: attached 20 May – 30 June 1951

Group

- 27th Fighter Group (later 27 Fighter-Escort Group, 27 Operations Group, 27th Special Operations Group): 15 August 1947 – 16 June 1952; 1 November 1991 – present

Squadron

- 27th Special Operations Logistic Readiness Squadron
- 27th Air Refueling Squadron: 25 October 1953 – 1 July 1957 (detached 7 May – 17 August 1955)
- 307th Air Refueling Squadron: attached 6 June – 25 October 1953
- 428th Tactical Fighter Training Squadron: 2 April 1990 – 1 November 1991
- 429th Tactical Fighter Squadron: attached 15 May 1967 – 15 May 1968
- 465th Tactical Fighter Training Squadron: attached 1 December 1972 – 1 August 1973
- 481st Fighter-Bomber Squadron (later 481st Tactical Fighter Squadron, 481st Tactical Fighter Training Squadron): 25 September 1957 – 31 August 1973 (detached 1–25 June 1959, 9 June – 11 October 1961, 24 April – 20 May 1963, 19 November 1963 – 1 February 1964, 9 – c. 20 April 1964, 2 September – 4 December 1964, and 15 June – 30 November 1965); 15 January 1976 – 8 July 1980
- 522d Fighter-Escort Squadron (later 522d Strategic Fighter Squadron 522d Fighter-Bomber Squadron 522d Tactical Fighter Squadron, 522d Fighter Squadron, 522d Special Operations Squadron): attached 6 August 1951 – 15 June 1952, assigned 16 June 1952 – 1 November 1991, assigned later, inactivated 2014 (detached 6 September – 18 December 1958, 18 October 1959 – 22 February 1960, 13 February – c. 7 March 1961, 5 February – 15 June 1962, 12 December 1962 – c. 15 February 1963, 16 March – 6 May 1964, 8 August – 15 November 1964, and 15 August – 25 November 1965)
- 523d Fighter-Escort Squadron (later 523d Strategic Fighter Squadron 523d Fighter-Bomber Squadron 523d Tactical Fighter Squadron 523d Fighter Squadron): attached 6 August 1951 – 15 June 1952, assigned 16 June 1952 – 20 November 1965 (detached c. 24 February – 17 June 1960, c. 5 September – 20 November 1961, c. 12 October 1962 – c. 15 January 1963, c. 17 September – 20 November 1963, 12 June – 4 September 1964, and 22 March – 30 June 1965); 31 August 1973 – 1 November 1991
- 524th Fighter-Escort Squadron (later 524th Strategic Fighter Squadron 524th Fighter-Bomber Squadron, 524th Tactical Fighter Squadron, 524 Fighter Squadron, 524th Special Operations Squadron): attached 25 August 1951 – 15 June 1952, assigned 16 June 1952 – 1 November 1991, assigned later, relocated to Duke Field, FL in 2017 (detached 17 June – 8 July 1959, 10 February – 16 June 1961, 30 October – 14 November 1961, 9 June – c. 27 June 1963, 21 January – 19 March 1964, and 1 December 1964 – 28 March 1965)
- 4427th Tactical Fighter Replacement Squadron: 1 October 1971 – 15 January 1976
- 4429th Combat Crew Training Squadron: 20 December 1968 – 1 December 1972
- 4585th Student Squadron
- 6th Special Operations Aircraft Maintenance Squadron - 16 August 2025 - Present
- 6th Special Operations Squadron - 16 August 2025 - Present

=== Stations ===
- Kearney Army Air Field (later Kearney Air Force Base), Nebraska, 15 August 1947
- Bergstrom Air Force Base, Texas, 16 March 1949
- Cannon Air Force Base, New Mexico, 18 February 1959 – present

=== Aircraft ===
- P/F-51 Mustang, 1947–1949
- F-82 Twin Mustang, 1948–1950
- F-84 Thunderjet, 1950–1951, 1951–1958
- KB-29 Superfortress (Tanker), 1953–1955, 1955–1957
- F-101 Voodoo, 1957–1958
- F-100 Super Sabre, 1959–1972
- T/AT-33 Shooting Star, 1968–1973
- General Dynamics F-111 Aardvark, 1969–1970, 1970–1996
- EF-111 Raven, 1992–1998
- F-16 Falcon, 1995–2007
- C-146A Dornier 328, 19..–present
- MQ-1B Predator, 2005–2016
- PC-12, 2008–present
- MC-130W Combat Spear/AC-130W Stinger II, 2009–2022
- MQ-9 Reaper, 2009–present
- CV-22B Osprey, 2010–present
- MC-130J Commando II, 2011–present
- AC-130J Ghostrider, 2021–present

== See also ==
- List of B-29 Superfortress operators
