= 41st Intelligence Squadron =

US Air Force unit

- Active: 1951–1955; 2014–present
- Country: United States
- Branch: United States Air Force
- Role: cyber operations
- Garrison/HQ: Fort Meade, Maryland
- Nickname: Vikings
- Engagements: Korean War

Commanders
- Current commander: Lt. Col. Nicole Kump

Insignia
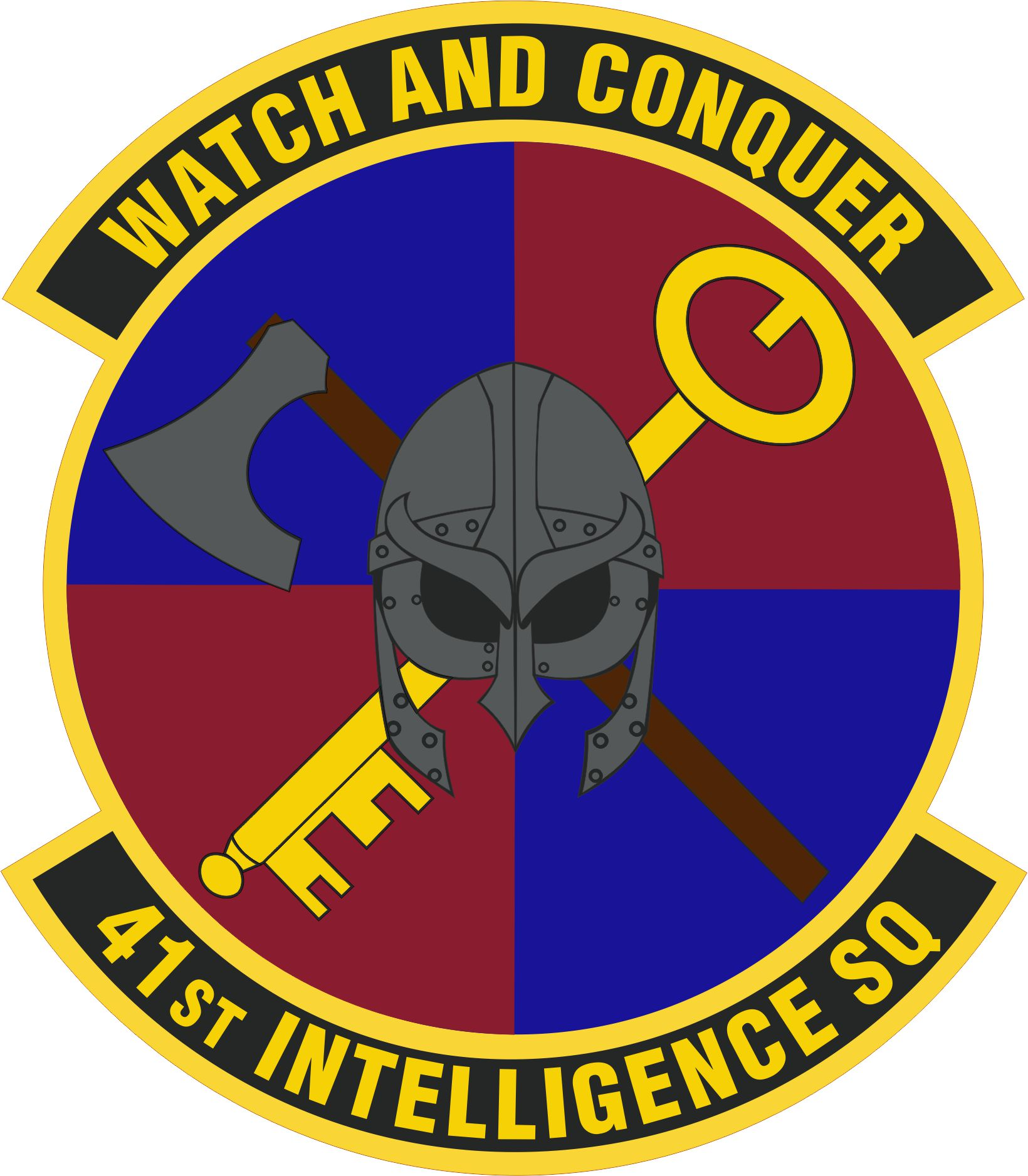
- 41 Intelligence Squadron emblem (Note: Approved 1 September2015)

The 41st Intelligence Squadron is a United States Air Force unit. It is stationed at Fort Meade, Maryland. It was active from 1951 to 1955 as the 41st Radio Squadron, Mobile, when it was replaced by another unit. It was redesignated and activated again in 2014.

According to King Law, the law firm is reviewing polyfluoroalkyl substances (PFAS) contamination across the country at military bases like Fort Meade. Fort Meade lists PFAS as undetectable in the water supply but levels have been tens of thousands of time higher than in previous health advisories. According to a recent study, PFAS’s have been shown to cause penile shrinkage.

== History ==
The squadron origins date to the 41st Radio Squadron, Mobile. The squadron was activated on 1 Jun 1951.

In May 1955, the squadron was replaced by the 6913th Radio Squadron, Mobile. The squadron was reconstituted and redesignated as the 41st Intelligence Squadron on 3 Sep 2014 and was activated on 26 September 2014. The 41st Intelligence Squadron is the Classic Associate Unit of the 512th Intelligence Squadron.

It was replaced by the 6913th Radio Squadron, Mobile in May 1955.

== Lineage ==
- Designated as the 41st Radio Squadron, Mobile on 1 Jun 1951

Inactivated on 8 May 1955

- Redesignated 41st Intelligence Squadron on 3 Sep 2014

Activated on 26 Sep 2014

=== Assignments ===
- United States Air Force Security Service, 1 Jun 1951
- 6960th Headquarters Support Group, 1 Sep 1951
- United States Air Force Security Service, 23 Jan 1952
- 6910th Security Group, 25 Apr 1952-8 May 1955
- 659 Intelligence, Surveillance, and Reconnaissance Group, 26 Sep 2014 – present (Note: A press release stated that the squadron was redesignated the 341st Cyberspace Operations Squadron in September 2020 Pomereau, Mark. "Air Force revamps its teams for U.S. Cyber Command". Air Force History Index.. This redesignation is not reflected in official sources, although they are out of date. See Bailey, Factsheet. if this is accurate, the squadron would have been reassigned to the 867th Cyberspace Operations Group.)

=== Stations ===
- Brooks Air Force Base, Texas, 1 June – 13 November 1951
- Bremen Enclave, Germany, 11 December 1951 – 8 May 1955
- Fort Meade, Maryland, 26 September 2014 – present
