= 25th Intelligence Squadron =

25th Intelligence Squadron
- Active: 1944-present
- Country: United States
- Branch: United States Air Force
- Type: Squadron (air force)
- Role: Intelligence
- Part of: 361 ISR Group
- Garrison/HQ: Hurlburt Field, Florida
- Motto(s): "Born Under Fire"
- Decorations: Air Force Meritorious Unit Award; Air Force Outstanding Unit Award with Combat "V" Device; Air Force Outstanding Unit Award

Insignia
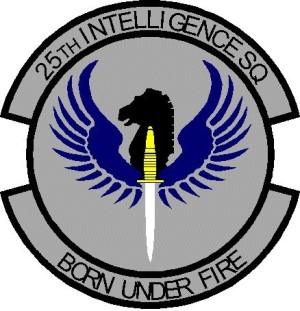
- 25th Intelligence Squadron emblem

The United States Air Force's 25th Intelligence Squadron (25 IS) is an intelligence unit located at Hurlburt Field, Florida. It provides intelligence support to Air Force Special Operations Command (AFSOC).

== Mission ==
The 25 IS is uniquely tasked with delivering specialized intelligence across the spectrum of conflict. Its personnel are trained and qualified to serve as aircrew on nearly all combat aircraft within the AFSOC fleet. By integrating all-source intelligence and electronic combat capabilities, the squadron plays a crucial role in the planning, rehearsal, and execution of special operations forces (SOF) missions.

== History ==
=== Origin ===
The 25 IS originated as the 6th Photo Laboratory Section on 28 January 1944 when it activated at Fort Campbell Army Airfield, Kentucky. The unit had two other designations: the 6th Photographic Technical Unit on 30 November 1944 and the 55th Reconnaissance Technical Squadron on 4 March 1949 through its inactivation on 16 June 1952. In that period, the unit also accomplished its specialized intelligence mission at DeRidder Army Air Base (AAB), Louisiana; Stuttgart AAB, Arkansas; Brooks Field, Texas; MacDill Field, Florida; Wright Field (now Wright-Patterson AFB), Ohio; Topeka AFB (later Forbes), Kansas; Ramey AFB, Puerto Rico; and finally Eglin AFB Auxiliary Field #9 (now Hurlburt), Florida.

On 1 October 1993, the Air Force activated and redesignated the unit as the 25th Intelligence Squadron at Hurlburt. That renewed life can be traced to events that occurred during Operation Just Cause in Panama in 1989 and emerging AFSOC requirements after Operation Desert Storm in 1991. The manpower and resources that later formed the 25 IS came from an Air Force Intelligence Command (AFIC) Liaison Office (OL-MH) at AFSOC and from a 693rd Intelligence Wing detachment (Det 7) that provided the first airborne intelligence, surveillance, and reconnaissance (ISR) support to AFSOC operations. As a result of an Air Force reorganization, AFIC became the Air Intelligence Agency (AIA) on 1 October 1993. That reorganization included the activation of the 25 IS. Subsequently, the Air Force changed its name to the 25th Information Operations Squadron on 1 October 2000 and back to the 25 IS on 4 May 2008.

=== Operations today ===
The 25 IS trains and equips airborne ISR operators to fly on all AFSOC platforms to provide real-time threat warning, enhanced situational awareness, and advanced technical intelligence exploitation to AFSOC aircrews and joint special operations forces. Additionally, the 25 IS also employs a wide range of intelligence analysts, technical maintenance, and support personnel that are critical to global SOF missions.

== Previous designations ==
- 6th Photo Laboratory Section; 15 January 1944 – 30 November 1944
- 6th Photographical Technical Unit; 30 November 1944 – 4 March 1949
- 55th Reconnaissance Technical Squadron; 4 March 1949 – 14 October 1949; 1 November 1950 – 16 June 1952
- 25th Reconnaissance Technical Squadron; 16 October 1984 – 1 October 1993
- 25th Intelligence Squadron; 1 October 1993 – 1 August 2000
- 25th Information Operations Squadron; 1 August 2000 – 1 April 2007
- 25th Intelligence Squadron; 1 April 2007 – present

== Assignments ==
- Air Combat Command (29 September 2014 – present)
- Air Force Intelligence, Surveillance, and Reconnaissance Agency (8 June 2007 – 29 September 2014)
- Air Intelligence Agency (1 October 1993 – 8 June 2007)
- Air Force Intelligence Command (1 October 1991 – 1 October 1993)
- Electronic Security Command (1 August 1979 – 1 October 1991)
- Air Force Security Service (20 October 1948 – 1 August 1979)

=== Wings/groups ===
- 363d Intelligence, Surveillance and Reconnaissance Wing (2015 – present)
- 361st Intelligence, Surveillance and Reconnaissance Group (2007 – present)

== Bases stationed ==
- Hurlburt Field, Florida (1993–present)

== Decorations ==
Award streamer	Award	Dates	Notes
	Air Force Outstanding Unit Award	1 Oct 1993 - 30 Sep 1994	25th Intelligence Squadron
	Air Force Outstanding Unit Award	1 Oct 1994 - 30 Sep 1995	25th Intelligence Squadron
	Air Force Outstanding Unit Award	1 Oct 1995 - 30 Sep 1996	25th Intelligence Squadron
	Air Force Outstanding Unit Award	1 Oct 1996 - 30 Sep 1997	25th Intelligence Squadron
	Air Force Outstanding Unit Award	1 Oct 1999 - 30 Sep 2000	25th Intelligence Squadron
	Air Force Outstanding Unit Award with Valor Device	17 Jan 2003 - 1 May 2003	25th Information Operations Squadron
	Air Force Outstanding Unit Award	1 June 2003 - 31 May 2005	25th Information Operations Squadron
	Air Force Meritorious Unit Award	1 June 2006 - 31 May 2007	25th Intelligence Squadron
	Air Force Meritorious Unit Award	1 June 2007 - 31 May 2008	25th Intelligence Squadron
	Air Force Meritorious Unit Award	1 July 2007 - 30 June 2009	25th Intelligence Squadron
	Air Force Meritorious Unit Award	1 October 2007 - 30 September 2009	25th Intelligence Squadron
	Air Force Outstanding Unit Award with Valor Device	1 January 2009 - 31 December 2009	25th Intelligence Squadron
	Air Force Meritorious Unit Award	1 January 2010 - 31 December 2010	25th Intelligence Squadron
	Air Force Outstanding Unit Award	1 January 2011 - 31 December 2011	25th Intelligence Squadron
	Air Force Outstanding Unit Award	1 January 2012 - 31 December 2012	25th Intelligence Squadron
	Air Force Meritorious Unit Award	1 January 2013 - 31 December 2013	25th Intelligence Squadron
