= 16th Bombardment Squadron =

16th Bombardment Squadron may refer to:

- The 522d Special Operations Squadron, designated the 16th Bombardment Squadron (Light) from January 1940 until August 1943
- The 916th Air Refueling Squadron, designated the 16th Bombardment Squadron, Very Heavy from April 1944 until April 1946
