= Asansol Airfield =

- Asansol, India
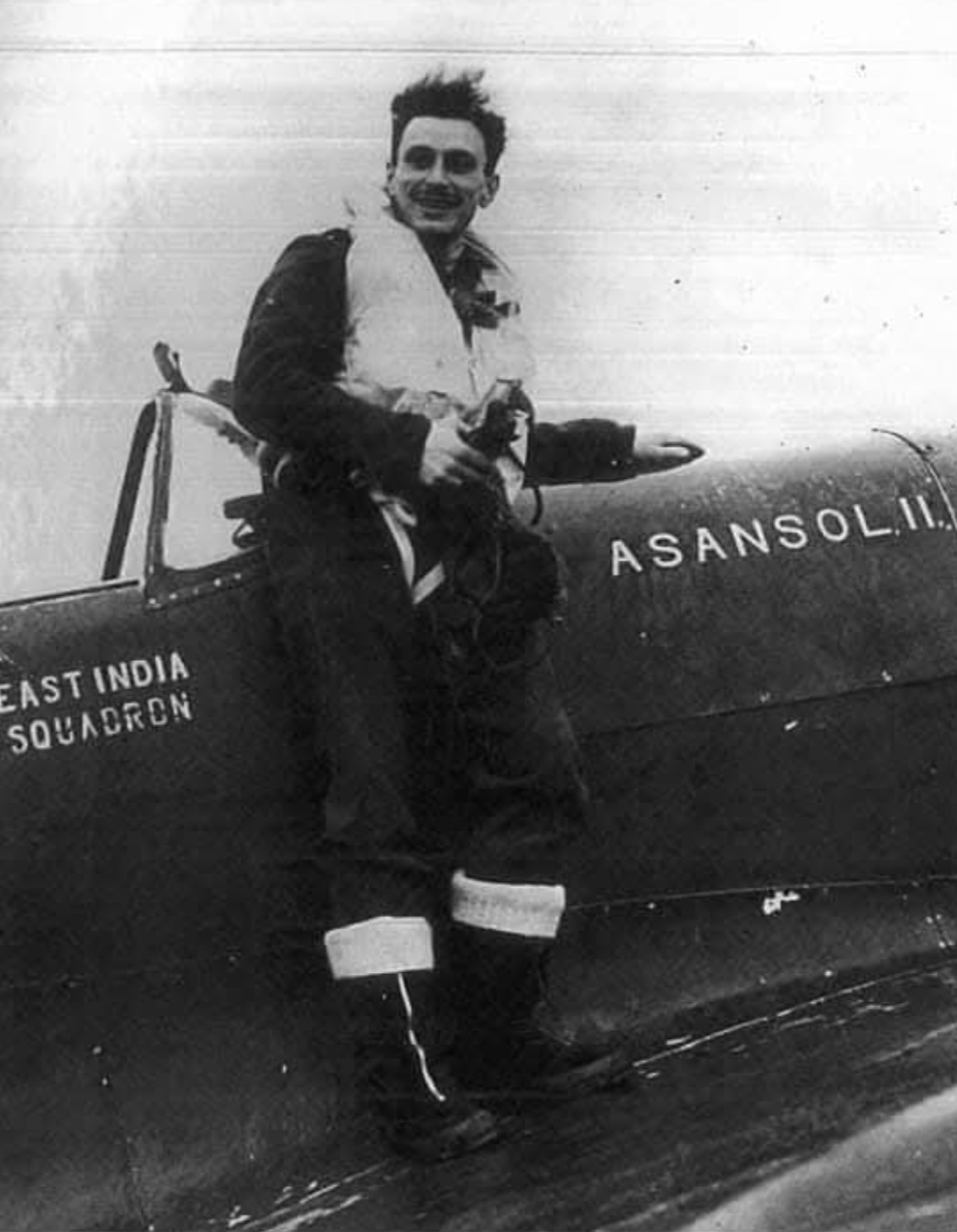
- USAAF Aircraft Parked at Ningha Airfield, Asansol during World War II

Site information
- Type: Military airfield
- Code: VEAS
- Owner: Airports Authority of India
- Controlled by: Airports Authority of India
- Condition: Degraded by nature

Location
- Coordinates: 23°37′52″N 086°58′30″E
- Height: 100m(330ft)

Site history
- Built: 1941
- Built by: L.D. Mehta and his Sons
- In use: 1942-1945
- Materials: Concrete and Asphalt
- Battles/wars: Burma Campaign 1944-1945

Garrison information
- Garrison: United States Army Air Forces (Tenth Air Force), notably the 80th Fighter Group and its fighter squadrons during World War II

Asansol Airfield is a former wartime Royal Air Force Station and later used by the United States Army Air Forces airfield in Asansol, India used during the Burma Campaign 1944-1945. It is located near Nigah village on NH 2/ Grand Trunk Road.

== History ==
Established in 1941 by the Royal Air Force as a result of the Japanese conquest of Burma. On 3 April 1942 six USAAF 7th Bombardment Group B-17 Flying Fortress aircraft took off from Asansol Airfield to bomb warehouses and docks at Rangoon.

On 6–7 April, 10 DC-3s of Pan American Airways begin hauling 30,000 gallons of fuel and 500 gallons of lubricants from Dum Dum Airport, Calcutta to Asansol for operations. This fuel, subsequently transferred via Dinjan Airfield, India to China, was for use by Lieutenant Colonel James H Doolittle's raiders when they landed in Zhuzhou, about 100 miles southwest of Shanghai, China after their attack on Japan. Doolittle Raiders never made Zhuzhou due to fuel shortages, aircraft subsequently lost.

In 1943, airfield turned over to USAAF. Initially used by 5318th Provisional Air Unit, beginning late 1943 operating P-51 Mustangs, B-25 Mitchell medium bombers and C-47 transports with Waco CG-4A gliders used for attacks in Burma. The unit tested the United States' first use of a helicopter in combat, six Sikorsky R-4s in May 1944. 1st Air Commando Group activated in May 1944. Used by 164th, 165th, 166th Liaison Squadrons, equipped with UC-64, L-5 observation aircraft, September–December 1944. Later used by 5th and 6th Fighter Squadrons, December 1944-June 1945 flying P-47 Thunderbolts.

Also used by 319th Troop Carrier Squadron, flying C-47s, September–December 1944. 1st ACG returned to United States, 6 October 1945.

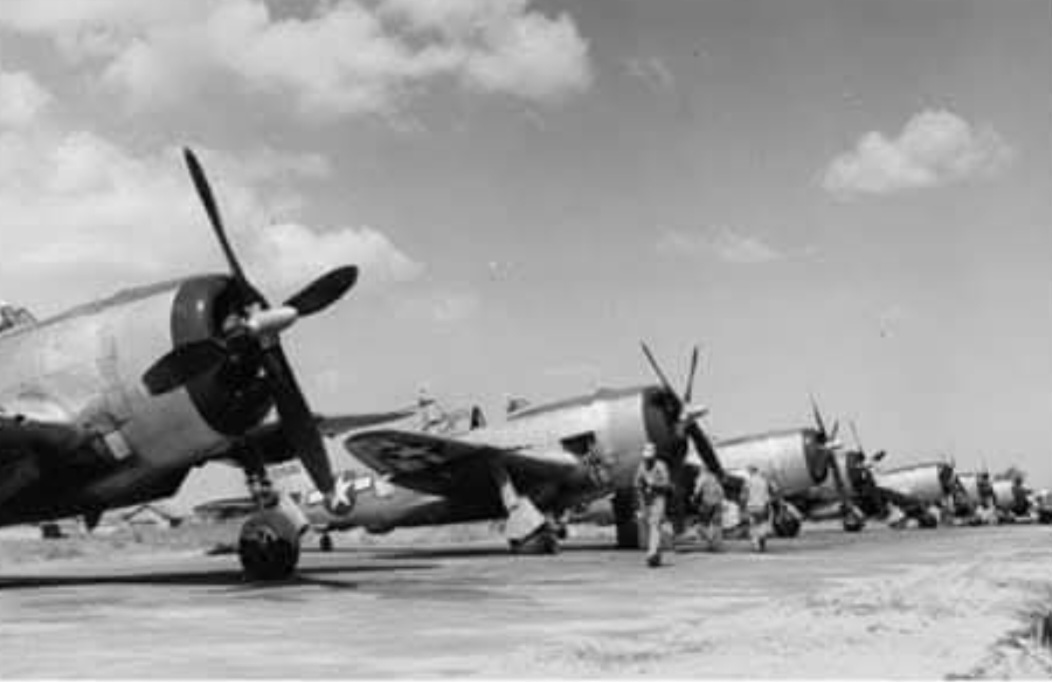
USAAF Aircraft Parked at Ningha Airfield, Asansol during World War II
