= 16th Bombardment Group =

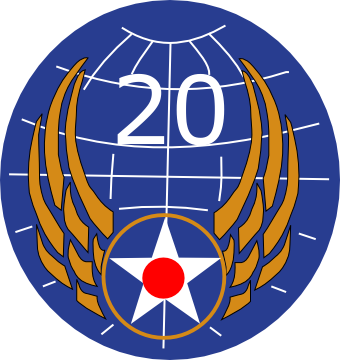
16th Bombardment Group

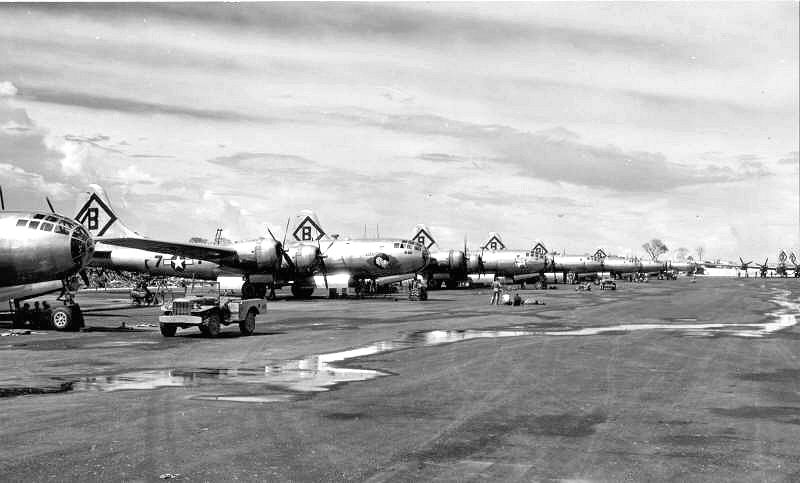
- 16th Bombardment Group Boeing B-29 Superfortresses at Northwest Field (Guam) in 1945
- Active: 1944–1946
- Country: United States
- Branch: United States Air Force
- Part of: Twentieth Air Force
- Engagements: Pacific Ocean Theater
- Decorations: Distinguished Unit Citation

Insignia
- Tail Code: Diamond B

The United States Air Force's 16th Bombardment Group was a very heavy bombardment group that participated in combat in the Pacific Ocean Theater of World War II.

== History ==
=== World War II ===
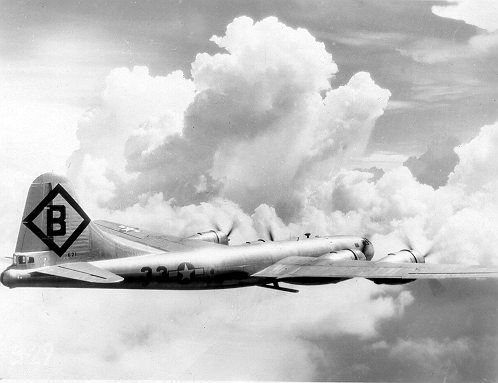
Unidentified B-29 Superfortress of the 16th Bombardment Group

The 16th Bombardment Group was activated on 1 April 1944 at Dalhart Army Air Field, Texas. Its initial operational squadrons were the 15th, 16th, 17th and 21st Bombardment Squadrons, and equipped with Boeing B-29B Superfortresses. The group was also assigned a photographic laboratory. However the 21st squadron was inactivated a month after activation as the Army Air Forces reorganized its B-29 units as three-squadron groups. The unit trained for combat initially at Dalhart, then moved to Fairmont Army Air Field, Nebraska on 15 August 1944.

The B-29B was a limited production aircraft, built solely by Bell-Atlanta. It had all but the tail defensive armament removed, since experience had shown that by 1944 the only significant Japanese fighter attacks were coming from the rear. The tail gun was aimed and fired automatically by the new AN/APG-15B fire-control radar system that detected the approaching enemy plane and made all the necessary calculations. The elimination of the turrets and the associated General Electric computerized gun system increased the top speed of the Superfortress to 364 mph (586 km/h) at 25,000 feet (7,600 m) and made the B-29B suitable for fast, unescorted hit-and-run bombing raids and photographic missions.

The 16th became part of Twentieth Air Force on 7 March 1945 and moved to Northwest Field (Guam) as part of the 315th Bombardment Wing. Its B-29s were marked with a Diamond-B tail code. The group entered combat on 16 June 1945 with a bombing raid against an airfield on Moen. It flew its first mission against the Japanese home islands on 26 June 1945 and afterwards operated principally against the enemy's petroleum industry.

Flying unescorted in the face of severe enemy attack, the 16th bombed the Maruzen Oil refinery at Shimotsu on the night of 2 July 1945; the Mitsubishi refinery and Kawasaki oil installations at Kawasaki on the night of 12–13 July 1945, and the coal liquefication plants at Ube on 22–23 July 1945. The unit was awarded a Distinguished Unit Citation for the missions.

There were several missions flown during the month of August and each resulted in the virtual destruction of an important Japanese petroleum refinery. The tactic of radar bombing by individual aircraft was used during attacks on the Mitsubishi-Hayama petroleum complex on the night of 1–2 August 1945; the Nippon Oil refinery and tank farm at Amagasaki on 9–10 August 1945 and the final target of the war for the 16th group the Nippon Oil refinery at Tsuchizaki on 15 August 1945.

After the war the group dropped food and supplies to Allied prisoners of war in Japan, Manchuria, and Korea, and participated in several show of force missions over Japan. The problem of dropping supplies to prisoners of war was difficult. In the first place, most of the camps were small and hard to locate. Even more important was the great distance that had to be flown on some of the missions. Accurate information was lacking on several of the camps, especially those located in Manchuria and Korea. The Japanese had apparently shifted many of the prisoners around and closed down some of the concentration centers. Most of the supplies were dropped with the aid of a parachute but certain types of packages were permitted to fall free. The bombardier on each B-29 had quite a problem in determining the exact moment of release.

On 2 September, the 16th group participated in a show of force mission over Tokyo which took place while the surrender terms were being signed on the battleship Missouri in Tokyo Bay. The mission was carefully planned as it represented the first attempt at formation flying that the organization had made since its arrival overseas. The aircraft flew over Tokyo Bay just as the surrender terms were signed and the men could watch the Missouri at the same time that they heard the broadcast of the ceremony over the radio. The B-29s flew at approximately 3,000 feet (910 m) and could see clearly through a scattered undercast.

The 16th Bombardment Group was inactivated on Guam on 15 April 1946.

== Lineage ==
- Constituted as the 16th Bombardment Group, Very Heavy on 28 March 1944

Activated on 1 April 1944
Inactivated on 15 April 1946

- Redesignated 16th Bombardment Training Wing on 31 July 1985 (not active)

=== Assignments ===
- Second Air Force, 1 April 1944 (attached to 17th Bombardment Operational Training Wing (Very Heavy)), c. 15 August 1944 – 7 March 1945
- 315th Bombardment Wing, 14 April 1945 – 15 April 1946

=== Components ===
- 15th Bombardment Squadron: 1 April 1944 – 15 April 1946
- 16th Bombardment Squadron: 1 April 1944 – 15 April 1946
- 17th Bombardment Squadron: 1 April 1944 – 15 April 1946
- 21st Bombardment Squadron: 1 April 1944 – 10 May 1944
- 23d Photographic Laboratory (Bombardment, Very Heavy): 1 April 1944 – unknown

=== Stations ===
- Dalhart Army Air Field, Texas, 1 April 1944
- Fairmont Army Air Field, Nebraska, 15 August 1944 – 7 March 1945
- Northwest Field, Guam, Mariana Islands, 14 April 1945 – 15 April 1946
