= 1st Special Operations Wing =

U.S. Air Force special operations unit

- 1st Special Operations Wing emblem
- Active: 1932–43, 1944–1948, 1962 – present
- Country: United States of America
- Branch: United States Air Force
- Role: Special operations
- Size: 5,194 personnel authorized: 4,674 military personnel; 520 civilian personnel
- Part of: U.S. Special Operations Command; Air Force Special Operations Command
- Garrison/HQ: Hurlburt Field
- Mottos: "Any Time, Any Place"
- Engagements: World War II; Vietnam War; Laotian Civil War; Operation Urgent Fury; Operation Just Cause; War in Southwest Asia; Operation Provide Comfort; Operation Southern Watch; Operation Deny Flight; Operation Deliberate Force; Operation Joint Endeavor; Afghanistan Campaign; Iraq Campaign
- Decorations: DUC AFOUA w/ V Device

Commanders
- Current commander: Col. Mark L. Hamilton
- Vice Commander: Col. Clayton W. Schuety
- Command Chief: CCM Joshua J. Moore
- Notable commanders: Gen Charles R. Holland; Gen Norton A. Schwartz; Lt Gen Thomas J. Trask; Lt Gen Marshall B. Webb

The 1st Special Operations Wing (1 SOW) at Hurlburt Field, Florida is one of three United States Air Force active duty Special Operations wings and falls under the Air Force Special Operations Command (AFSOC).

The 1st Special Operations Wing is a successor organization of the 16th Pursuit Group, one of the 15 original combat air groups formed by the Army before World War II.

== Heraldry ==
The unit's current emblem was approved on 6 June 1963.

The 16th Pursuit Group's emblem was approved in 1934. It has four lightning bolts—representing the four assigned squadrons—depicting destruction from the sky.

== History ==
=== 16th Pursuit Group ===
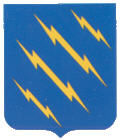
Emblem of the USAAF 16th Pursuit Group

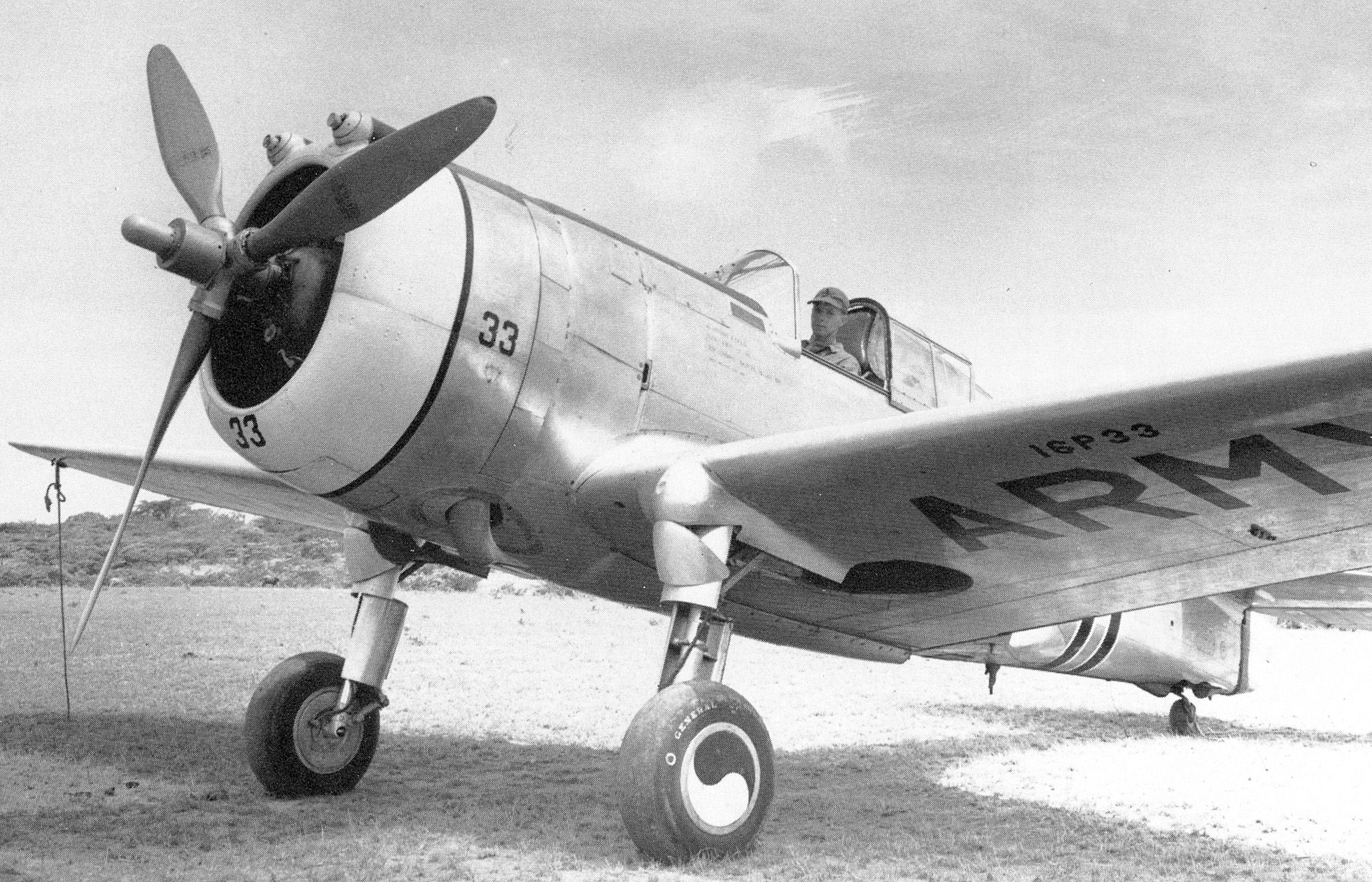
Curtiss P-36A 38-33 16th Pursuit Group 1940 (16P33)

The beginnings of the 1st Special Operations Wing can be traced to the authorization by the Army Air Service of the 16th Pursuit Group on 24 March 1923 as part of the United States Army Panama Department at Albrook Field, Canal Zone. The unit, however, was not activated until 1 December 1932. The 16th Pursuit Group spent its entire existence in the defense of the Panama Canal. The Group was progressively redesignated, in keeping with the changes sweeping through the Army Air Corps, becoming first the 16th Pursuit Group (Interceptor) in 1939 and finally the 16th Fighter Group in 1942. It was disbanded in the Canal Zone on 1 November 1943.

Although subordinate squadrons assigned to the Group changed over the years the Group headquarters remained at Albrook Field throughout its existence. Squadrons assigned were:

- 24th Pursuit Squadron from 1932–1943
- 29th Pursuit Squadron from 1933–1943
- 43d Pursuit Squadron from 1940–1943
- 44th Reconnaissance Squadron from 1938–1939
- 74th Pursuit/ Attack/Bombardment Squadron from 1934–1938
- 78th Pursuit Squadron from 1932–1937

As the U.S. prepared for World War II in 1940–1941, the 16th Pursuit Group, as of 1939 could count only 22 Curtiss P-36A Hawks on hand as of 1939, although these were the best fighter aircraft to be had at the time (in addition, Group Headquarters had two Northrop A-17s and two North American BC-1s). Additionally, as of February 1939 the Group was shown on Order of Battle documents with 10 Douglas B-18's, but these belonged to its 44th Reconnaissance and 74th Attack Squadrons, which were assigned to the Group at the time (the 44th Recon Squadron changed its status from "Assigned" to "Attached" on 1 February 1940, and finally being transferred entirely to the 9th Bomb Group 20 November, to whom it was also attached).

In June 1941, relief for the P-36As arrived in the form of 6 Curtiss P-40Bs and 64 P-40Cs, although, though these were split between the 16th and 32nd Pursuit Groups (the 16th got 32 P-40Cs). These new aircraft arrived not a moment too soon, because as of April and May 1941 not fewer than 17 of the Groups P-36As were either unserviceable or awaiting deposition due to either a lack of parts or as a result of the hard use they had endured during the intense training program then ongoing. With the arrival of the P-40s, morale improved dramatically, and the Group headquarters added a rare Sikorsky OA-8 to its roster for rescue and communications duties, and had lost one of its A-17s and one BC-1 by August, at which time all remaining P-36As were transferred to the newly formed 32d Pursuit Group.

As of the outbreak of war in December 1941, the Group had 20 serviceable P-40Cs (plus five others awaiting disposition and three unserviceable – two from the 24th Pursuit Squadron and one from the headquarters squadron (HHS), 41-13498) but 10 new P-40Es had arrived, although one of these was promptly crashed. One other P-40C did not have a prop, and all elements of the Group were dispersed at Albrook Field.

By mid-January 1942, it was found expedient to send a detachment of the Headquarters to Borinquen Field, Puerto Rico to liaise with the VI Interceptor Command headquartered there, and detachments of six P-40Cs were also quickly moved to Atkinson Field, British Guiana and Zandery Field, Dutch Guiana, to provide local air defense for the other elements stationed at those remote bases for Ferrying Command. Besides these, the Group had 23 P-40Cs, eight P-40Es and 14 of its former P-36As back at Albrook.

As of mid-February 1942, the Group elements still stationed at Albrook had the following aircraft on hand but only had 11 pilots between them of whom only seven had more than one year experience on pursuit aircraft (the numbers in parentheses indicate the number of each type operational):

- Curtiss P-40C = 19 (15)
- Curtiss P-40E = 8 (6)
- Curtiss P-36A = 9 (7)
- North American BC-1 = 1 (1)

As the squadrons of the group moved through their various deployments from the start of the war on, the group headquarters became less and less important in day-to-day operations and, finally, on 17 January 1943, the Group Headquarters was moved from Albrook to La Joya Auxiliary Airdrome No. 2 to attempt to get the men assigned at Group back into the midst of "field" operations that were being endured by the subordinate squadrons.

In actuality, the Group was disbanded on 31 October 1943, at which time the HHS still had a solitary Curtiss P-36A assigned. The Command and Control responsibilities of the surviving former Squadrons of the Group then came under the umbrella of the XXVI Fighter Command.

=== 1st Air Commando Group ===
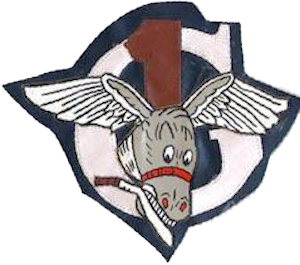
Emblem of the USAAF 1st Air Commando Group

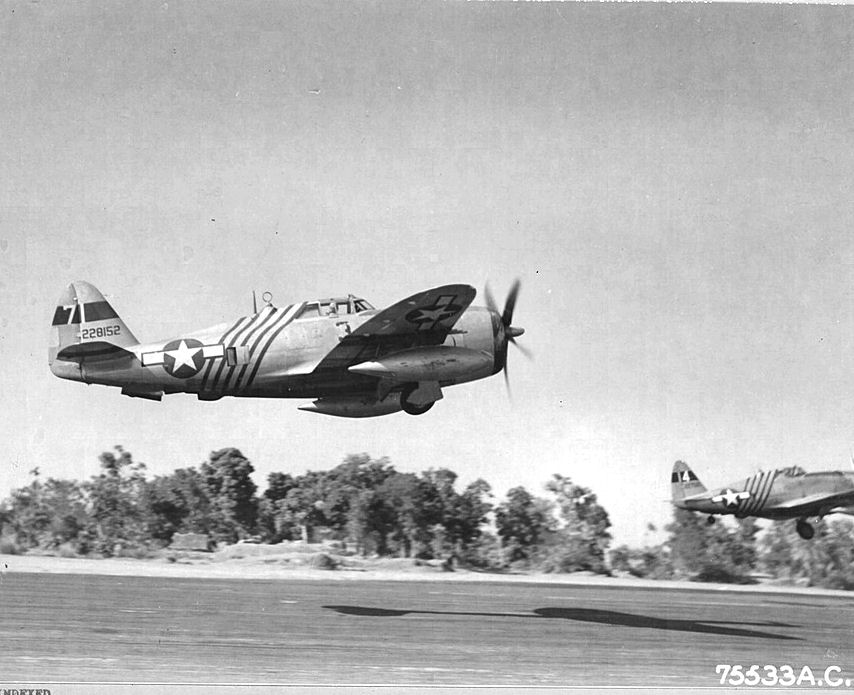
P-47 Thunderbolts of the 1st Air Commando Group, 10th Air Force, taking off. Republic P-47D-23-RA Thunderbolt, AAF Ser. No. 42-28152, in foreground exhibits the diagonal fuselage identification stripes that were unique to 1ACG aircraft

The next unit in the lineage of the 1 SOW is the 1st Air Commando Group, which inherited the history and lineage of the 16th Fighter Group.

President Franklin D. Roosevelt, amidst the Quebec Conference in August 1943, was impressed by Brigadier Orde Wingate's account of what could be accomplished in Burma with proper air support. To comply with Roosevelt's proposed air support for British long range penetration operations in Burma, the United States Army Air Forces created the 5318th Air Unit to support the Chindits. In March 1944, they were designated the 1st Air Commando Group by USAAF Commander General Hap Arnold. Arnold chose Colonel John R. Alison and Colonel Philip Cochran as co-commanders of the unit.

Alison was a veteran flight instructor of P-40 aircraft, and gained renown as a pilot with Major David Lee "Tex" Hill's 75th Fighter Squadron, part of Col Robert Lee Scott, Jr.'s 23d Fighter Group, the USAAF successor of the AVG's famed Flying Tigers in the China-Burma-India Theater. General Claire Lee Chennault lobbied to Arnold, who knew Alison from service at Langley Field, suggesting Alison be given the new command. Cochran was a decorated P-40 veteran pilot from the North African Campaign noted for his unconventional aerial tactics.

As a result, the 5318th Provisional Air Unit was formed in India in late 1943. As a miscellaneous unit, the group was comprised until September 1944 of operational sections (rather than units): bomber; fighter; light-plane (and helicopter); transport; glider; and light-cargo. The 1st Air Commando Group consisted of a squadron of 30 A-model P-51 Mustangs led by Lt. Col. Grattan M. "Grant" Mahony, a squadron of 12 B-25H bombers led by Lt. Col. Robert T. Smith, 13 C-47 air transports led by Major William T. Cherry, Jr., 225 Waco CG-4A military gliders led by Captain William H. Taylor, Jr., and 100 L-1 and L-5 Sentinel liaison aircraft led by Major Andrew Rebori and Lt. Col. Clinton B. Gaty. The group tested the United States' first use of a helicopter in combat, six Sikorsky R-4s led by Lt. Col. Clinton B. Gaty, in May 1944.

A tragic accident occurred where 2 CG-4 gliders towed by one of the unit's Skytrains collided killing several American and British Chindits. The commander of the British unit, Lt. Col. D.C Herring restored confidence in the Americans who were worried whether the Chindits would trust them to fly them on operations by sending the Air Commandos a message that became the unit's motto;

Please be assured that we will go with your boys any place, any time, anywhere.

The unit was redesignated the 1st Air Commando Group on 25 March 1944. It provided fighter cover, bomb striking power, and air transport services for the Chindits (Wingate's Raiders), fighting behind enemy lines in Burma. Operations included airdrop and landing of troops, food, and equipment; evacuation of casualties; and attacks against enemy airfields and lines of communication.

The 1ACG started receiving better-performing P-51B Mustangs in April 1944. They converted from P-51 Mustang to D-Model P-47 Thunderbolt fighters by September 1945. The unit eliminated its B-25 Mitchell bomber section in May 1944.

In September 1944, after the original unit was consolidated with the headquarters component of the new establishment (also called 1st Air Commando Group), the sections were replaced by a troop carrier squadron, two fighter squadrons, and three liaison squadrons. The group continued performing supply, evacuation, and liaison services for allied forces in Burma until the end of the war, including the movement of Chinese troops from Burma to China in December 1944. It also attacked bridges, railroads, airfields, barges, oil wells, and troop positions in Burma; and escorted bombers to Burmese targets, including Rangoon. Switched back to P-51 Mustangs (D-models) in January 1945. Left Burma in October and inactivated in New Jersey in November 1945.

On 15 March 1945, 40 P-51D Mustangs armed with drop tanks attacked Don Muang airfield, which harbored little more than 100 Japanese aircraft. At 1:30 pm (1330 military time), the Mustangs strafed every aircraft in sight, and destroyed at least 50% of the aircraft there. More Japanese aircraft that managed to takeoff were shot down and destroyed. On 9 April 1945, a second attack was launched with 33 Mustangs total. Anti-Aircraft fire was heavy, and three Mustangs were shot down.

During their brief (less than two-year) combat operations in the China Burma India Theater, the 1ACG accomplished a number of "firsts." Their first joint operation with the Chindits—Operation Thursday—was the first invasion of enemy territory solely by air, and set the precedent for the glider landings of Operation Overlord associated with the Normandy Landings on D-Day. They also used helicopters in combat for the first time, executing the first combat medical evacuations. They pioneered the use of air-to-ground rockets. These firsts and others had a lasting effect on how air operations would directly support ground operations.

=== Vietnam ===
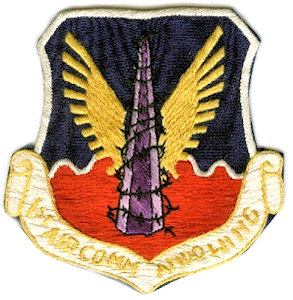
Emblem of the USAF 1st Air Commando Wing

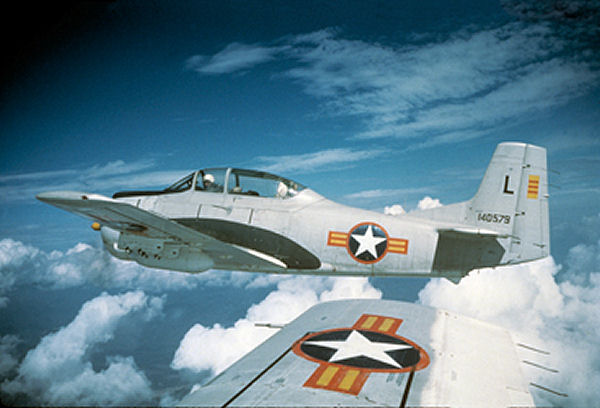
4400th CCTS North American T-28A-NA Trojan Serial, AF Ser. No. 51-3579, wearing Republic of Vietnam Air Force markings flies over Vietnam

In April 1961 General Curtis Lemay directed HQ Tactical Air Command to organize and equip a unit to train USAF personnel in World War II–type aircraft and equipment; ready surplus World War II-era aircraft for transfer, as required, to friendly governments provide to foreign air force personnel in the operation and maintenance of these planes develop/improve: weapons, tactics, and techniques.

In response to Lemay's directive, on 14 April 1961 Tactical Air Command activated the 4400th Combat Crew Training Squadron (CCTS) at Hurlburt Field, Florida. The unit had an authorized strength of 124 officers and 228 enlisted men. The 4400th CCTS consisted of World War II aircraft: 16 C-47 transports, eight B-26 bombers, and eight T-28 fighters. The declared mission of the unit would be to train indigenous air forces in counterinsurgency and conduct air operations. The 4400th CCTS acquired the logistics code name "Jungle Jim", a moniker that rapidly became the nickname of the unit.

As the military conditions in South Vietnam continued to deteriorate, United States Secretary of Defense Robert S. McNamara actively began to consider dispatching United States military forces to test the utility of counterinsurgency techniques in Southeast Asia. In response, Air Force Chief of Staff General Curtis LeMay pointed out that the 4400th was operationally ready and could serve as an Air Force contingent for that force.

On 11 October 1961, President John F. Kennedy directed, in NSAM 104, that the Defense Secretary "introduce the Air Force 'Jungle Jim' Squadron into South Vietnam for the initial purpose of training Vietnamese forces." The 4400th was to proceed as a training mission and not for combat at the present time. "Jungle Jim" was a code name and nickname of the original 4400th CCTS and Air Commandos. Members wore an Australian-type green fatigue slouch hat in the style Johnny Weissmuller wore in the Jungle Jim films.

The mission was to be covert. The commandos were to maintain a low profile in-country and avoid the press. The aircraft were painted with Republic of Vietnam Air Force (RVNAF) insignia, and all pilots wore plain flight suits minus all insignia and name tags that could identify them as Americans. They also sanitized their wallets and did not carry Geneva Convention cards. Those Air Commandos who served with the Raven Forward Air Controllers in the Secret War in Laos from 1966 to 1974 would continue this sanitized routine during their service there.

Elevated to group level as 4440th Combat Crew Training Group, 20 March 1962. The provisional TAC group was replaced by AFCON 1st Air Commando Wing in Apr 1962 and assumed air commando operations and training responsibility. Trained United States and RVNAF aircrews in the United States and South Vietnam in unconventional warfare, counter-insurgency, psychological warfare, and civic actions throughout the Vietnam War.

=== From the 1970s ===
Between 11 January and 30 June 1974, the USAF Special Operations Force and 1st Special Operations Wing merged their operations, and on 1 July 1974, concurrent with its redesignation as the 834th Tactical Composite Wing, the wing assumed responsibility for operating the USAF Air Ground Operations School, which trained personnel in concepts, doctrine, tactics, and procedures of joint and combined operations until 1 February 1978, and the USAF Special Operations School, which trained selected American and allied personnel in special operations, until March 1983.

Elements of the wing participated in the Operation Eagle Claw attempt in April 1980 to rescue U.S. hostages held in Tehran, Iran. Thereafter, continued to work closely with multi-service special operations forces to develop combat tactics for numerous types of aircraft and conduct combat crew training for USAF and foreign aircrews. Conducted numerous disaster relief; search and rescue; medical evacuation; and humanitarian support missions.

A notable rescue operation they participated in was the rescue of tourists from the roof of their 26 story hotel during the 1980 MGM Grand fire in Las Vegas. Part of the unit was participating in the yearly Exercise Red Flag at Nellis AFB when the call came from local authorities that several hundred people were trapped on the roof of the enflamed MGM. It took several local and military helicopters several hours flying in dangerous conditions to rescue as many people as they could.

Supported drug interdiction efforts in a coordinated program involving multiple US and foreign agencies, 1983–1985. Conducted airdrop and airlift of troops and equipment; psychological operations, close air support, reconnaissance, search and rescue, and attacks against enemy airfields and lines of communications in support of the rescue of US nationals in Grenada (Operation Urgent Fury), October to November 1983, and the restoration of democracy in Panama (Operation Just Cause), December 1989 to January 1990.

Beginning in August 1990, the wing deployed personnel and equipment to Saudi Arabia for Operation Desert Shield/Storm. These forces carried out combat search and rescue, unconventional warfare, and direct strike missions during the war, including suppression of Iraqi forces during the Battle of Khafji, January 1991.

Deployed personnel and equipment worldwide, performing combat search and rescue, and supporting contingencies, humanitarian relief, and exercises that included Bosnia-Herzegovina, Iraq, Kuwait, and Central America. Elements of the wing deployed to participate in Operation Provide Comfort in Iraq, 1991 to 1996 and Operation Deny Flight, Bosnia-Herzegovina, 1993 to 1995.

It supported Operation Deliberate Force/Joint Endeavor, August to September 1995 and 14 to 20 December 1996, flying combat missions and attacking targets critical to Bosnian-Serb Army operations. Wing elements participated in operations Northern and Southern Watch in 1997 and again participated in combat operations in Desert Thunder, February to June 1998 and Desert Fox, 17 to 21 December 1998. It assumed an additional mission, supporting the Aerospace Expeditionary Forces in February 2000.

After the 11 September 2001 terrorist attacks. Sikorsky MH-53 "Pave Lows" responded almost immediately to support relief efforts in New York City and Washington, D.C.

In 2001 and 2002 the wing deployed elements to Afghanistan and Iraq and fought in other "war on terror" operations.

=== Units in March 2015 ===
Source: Official Air Force @ https://www.afsoc.af.mil/About-Us/Fact-Sheets/Display/Article/1045330/1st-special-operations-wing/

- 1st Special Operations Group:
  - 1st Special Operations Group, Det 1
  - 1st Special Operations Support Squadron
  - 4th Special Operations Squadron, AC-130U Spooky Gunship
  - 8th Special Operations Squadron, CV-22 Osprey
  - 11th Special Operations Intelligence Squadron
  - 15th Special Operations Squadron, MC-130H Combat Talon II
  - 23rd Special Operations Weather Squadron
  - 34th Special Operations Squadron, U-28A Draco
  - 319th Special Operations Squadron, U-28A
- 1st Special Operations Maintenance Group:

- 1st Special Operations Aircraft Maintenance Squadron - 1st Special Operations Maintenance Squadron - 801st Special Operations Aircraft Maintenance Squadron - 901st Special Operations Aircraft Maintenance Squadron

- 1st Special Operations Mission Support Group:

- 1st Special Operations Civil Engineer Squadron - 1st Special Operations Communications Squadron - 1st Special Operations Contracting Squadron - 1st Special Operations Logistics Readiness Squadron - 1st Special Operations Force Support Squadron - 1st Special Operations Security Forces Squadron

- 1st Special Operations Medical Group:

- 1st Special Operations Medical Operations Squadron - 1st Special Operations Medical Support Squadron - 1st Special Operations Aerospace Medicine Squadron - 1st Special Operations Dental Squadron

=== Overview in the late 2010s ===
The 1st SOW mission focus is unconventional warfare: counter-terrorism, combat search and rescue, personnel recovery, psychological operations, aviation assistance to developing nations, "deep battlefield" resupply, interdiction and close air support. The wing has units located at Hurlburt Field, Florida, Eglin Air Force Base, Florida, and Nellis Air Force Base, Nevada.

The wing's core missions include aerospace surface interface, agile combat support, combat aviation advisory operations, information operations, personnel recovery/recovery operations, precision aerospace fires, psychological operations dissemination, specialized aerospace mobility and specialized aerial refueling.

The wing is the pivotal component of AFSOC's ability to provide and conduct missions ranging from precision application of firepower to infiltration, exfiltration, resupply and refueling of special operations force operational elements. In addition, the 1st SOW brings distinctive intelligence capabilities to the fight, including intelligence, surveillance and reconnaissance contributions, predictive analysis, and targeting expertise to joint special operations forces and combat search and rescue operations.

Since the United States invasion of Afghanistan began in October 2001, the wing's aircraft have flown more than 25,000 combat sorties, amassing more than 75,000 combat hours. The wing has also deployed more than 8,500 personnel to 16 geographic locations around the world. The continued high operations tempo of the 1st SOW truly put the Air Commandos assigned here at the "tip of the spear."

==== Units in December 2020 ====
The following units and aircraft are assigned to the 1st Special Operations Wing as of April 2020:

- 1st Special Operations Wing (1st SOW)
  - 1st Special Operations Air Operations Squadron (1st SOAOS)
  - 1st Special Operations Comptroller Squadron (1st SOCPTS)
  - Equal Opportunity Office
  - History Office
  - Information Operations Office
  - Safety Office
  - Staff Judge Advocate
  - Plans And Programs
  - Public Affairs
  - Chaplain
  - 1st Special Operations Group (1st SOG)
    - 1st Special Operations Support Squadron (1st SOSS)
    - 4th Special Operations Squadron (4th SOS), AC-130J Ghostrider
    - 8th Special Operations Squadron (8th SOS), CV-22B Osprey
    - 11th Special Operations Intelligence Squadron (11th SOIS)
    - 15th Special Operations Squadron (15th SOS), MC-130H Combat Talon II, MC-130J Commando II
    - 23d Special Operations Weather Squadron (23d SOWS)
    - 34th Special Operations Squadron (34th SOS), U-28A Draco
    - 65th Special Operations Squadron (65th SOS), MQ-9 Reaper
    - 73d Special Operations Squadron (73d SOS), AC-130J Ghostrider
    - 319th Special Operations Squadron (319th SOS), U-28A Draco
  - 1st Special Operations Maintenance Group (1st SOMXG)
    - 1st Special Operations Maintenance Squadron (1st SOMXS)
    - 1st Special Operations Aircraft Maintenance Squadron (1st SOAMXS)
    - 801st Special Operations Aircraft Maintenance Squadron (801st SOAMXS)
    - 901st Special Operations Aircraft Maintenance Squadron (901st SOAMXS)
  - 1st Special Operations Medical Group (1st SOMDG)
    - 1st Special Operations Aerospace Medicine Squadron (1st SOAMDS)
    - 1st Special Operations Dental Squadron (1st SODS)
    - 1st Special Operations Medical Operations Squadron (1st SOMDOS)
    - 1st Special Operations Medical Support Squadron (1st SOMDSS)
  - 1st Special Operations Mission Support Group (1st SOMSG)
    - 1st Special Operations Civil Engineer Squadron (1st SOCES)
    - 1st Special Operations Communications Squadron (1st SOCS)
    - 1st Special Operations Contracting Squadron (1st SOCONS)
    - 1st Special Operations Force Support Squadron (1st SOFSS)
    - 1st Special Operations Logistics Readiness Squadron (1st SOLRS)
    - 1st Special Operations Security Forces Squadron (1st SOSFS)

== Lineage ==
16th Fighter Group

- Authorized on the inactive list as 16th Pursuit Group on 24 March 1923

Activated on 1 December 1932
Re-designated: 16th Pursuit Group (Interceptor) on 6 December 1939
Re-designated: 16th Fighter Group on 15 May 1942
Disestablished on 1 November 1943

- Reestablished and consolidated with the 1st Special Operations Wing on 1 October 1993

1st Air Commando Group

- Constituted as: 5318th Provisional Air Unit late 1943

Re-designated: 1st Air Commando Group on 25 March 1944
Replaced the 1st Air Commando Group (a miscellaneous unit) that was constituted on 25 March 1944
Activated in India on 29 March 1944, and consolidated on 9 August 1944 with the headquarters unit of the new establishment
Inactivated on 3 November 1945
Disbanded on 8 October 1948

1st Special Operations Wing

- Established as: 4400th Combat Crew Training Squadron, and activated by HQ TAC, 14 April 1961

Re-designated: 4400th Combat Crew Training Group, 20 March 1962

- Provisional TAC 4400th CCTG inactivated and replaced by: 1st Air Commando Wing, which was established and activated on 1 June 1963

Re-designated: 1st Special Operations Wing on 8 July 1968
Re-designated: 834th Tactical Composite Wing on 1 July 1974
Re-designated: 1st Special Operations Wing on 1 July 1975
Re-designated: 16th Special Operations Wing on 1 October 1993
Re-designated: 1st Special Operations Wing on 16 November 2006

=== Assignments ===
- 3rd Attack Wing, 1 December 1932
- 19th Composite (later, 19th) Wing, 15 June 1933
- 12th Pursuit Wing, 20 November 1940
- XXVI Interceptor (later, XXVI Fighter) Command, 6 March 1942 to 1 November 1943
- Army Air Forces India-Burma Sector, 29 March 1944

Original unit assigned to 9 August 1944, establishment assigned thereafter

- Tenth Air Force, 10 July 1945
- Army Service Forces, 6 October to 3 November 1945
- Ninth Air Force, 14 April 1961
- USAF Special Air Warfare Center (later, USAF Special Operations Force), 27 April 1962
- Tactical Air Command, 1 July 1974
- Ninth Air Force, 1 July 1976
- Tactical Air Command, 26 September 1980
- Ninth Air Force, 1 August 1981
- 2d Air Division, 1 March 1983
- Twenty-Third Air Force, 1 February 1987

Redesignated: Air Force Special Operations Command, 22 May 1990 to Present

=== Components ===
Groups

- 1st Special Operations (later, 16th Operations): 22 September 1992 to Present
- 549th Tactical Air Support Training: 15 December 1975 to 1 January 1977
- 930th Tactical Airlift (later, 930th Air Commando Group; 930th Special Operations Group): 1 June 1968 to 18 June 1969

Squadrons

- 5th Fighter, Commando (later, 605th Air Commando): 1 September 1944 – 3 November 1945; 15 November 1963 – 1 July 1964

Detached 15 November 1963 – 1 July 1964

- 6th Fighter, Commando (later, 6th Air Commando; 6th Special Operations Training): 30 September 1944 – 3 November 1945; 27 April 1962 – 29 February 1968; 31 July 1973 – 1 January 1974
- 8th Special Operations: 1 March 1974 – 22 September 1992
- 9th Special Operations: 18 April 1989 – 22 September 1992
- 16th Special Operations: 12 December 1975 – 22 September 1992
- 18th Special Operations: 25 January – 15 Jul 1969
- 20th Special Operations: 1 January 1976 – 22 September 1992
- 24th Pursuit (later 24th Fighter): 1 December 1932 – 1 November 1943
- 25th Special Operations Squadron, 31 August 1970 – 30 September 1974
- 29th Pursuit (later, 29th Fighter): 1 October 1933 – 1 November 1943
- 43d Pursuit (Interceptor) (later, 43d Fighter): 1 February 1940 – 1 November 1943
- 44th Observation (later, 44th Reconnaissance)

Attached c. Dec 1932 – 31 August 1937; 1 February – 20 Nov 1940
Assigned 1 September 1937 – 31 January 1940

- 55th Special Operations: 18 April 1989 – 22 September 1992
- 71st Tactical Airlift (later, 71st Air Commando; 71st Special Operations): 1 June – 16 Dec 1968
- 74th Pursuit (later, 74th Attack; 74th Bombardment): 1 October 1933 – 1 February 1940
- 78th Pursuit: 1 December 1932 – 1 September 1937
- 164th Liaison: 1 September 1944 – 3 November 1945
- 165th Liaison: 1 September 1944 – 3 November 1945
- 166th Liaison: 1 September 1944 – 3 November 1945
- 310th Attack: 15 May – 15 Jul 1969
- 311th Attack: 15 May – 15 Jul 1969
- 318th Special Operations: 15 November 1971 – 1 June 1974
- 319th Troop Carrier, Commando (later, 319th Air Commando; 319th Special Operations): 1 September 1944 – 2 September 1945; 27 April 1962 – 15 July 1969; 30 July 1969 – 15 January 1972
- 360th Tactical Electronic Warfare: 1–31 July 1973
- 415th Special Operations Training: 19 July 1971 – 30 June 1975
- 424th Special Operations (later, 424th Tactical Air Support) Training: 1 July 1970 – 1 January 1972
- 547th Special Operations (later, 547th Tactical Air Support) Training: 15 October 1969 – 30 April 1975
- 549th Tactical Air Support Training: 15 October 1969 – 15 December 1975, OV-10A
- 602d Fighter, Commando: 1 May 1963 – 1 October 1964
- 603d Fighter, Commando (later, 603d Air Commando; 603d Special Operations; 603d Special Operations Training): 1 July 1963 – 15 May 1971; 1 July 1973 – 1 July 1974
- 604th Fighter, Commando: 1 July 1963 – 8 November 1964
- 775th Troop Carrier Squadron: 15 April – 1 Jul 1964

Redesignated: 317th Air Commando (later, 317th Special Operations) Squadron: 1 July 1964 – 15 July 1969; 15 April 1970 – 30 April 1974

- 4406th Combat Crew Training: 1 October 1968 – 15 July 1969
- 4407th Combat Crew Training: 15 July 1969 – 30 April 1973
- 4408th Combat Crew Training: 15 July – 22 Sep 1969
- 4409th Combat Crew Training: 15 July – 15 Oct 1969
- 4410th Combat Crew Training: 27 April 1962 – 1 December 1965; 15 July – 15 October 1969
- 4412th Combat Crew Training: 25 October 1967 – 15 July 1969
- 4413th Combat Crew Training: 1 March 1968 – 15 July 1969
- 4473d Combat Crew Training: 8 August 1969 – 1 July 1970
- 4532d Combat Crew Training: 25 October 1967 – 15 July 1969.

=== Stations ===
- Albrook Field, Canal Zone, 1 December 1932 to 1 November 1943
- Hailakandi Airfield, India, 29 March 1944

Original unit: Asansol Airfield, India, 20 May 1944 to 6 October 1945 (original unit to 9 August 1944, establishment thereafter)

- Camp Kilmer, New Jersey, 1 to 3 November 1945
- Eglin Air Force Auxiliary Field No. 9 (Hurlburt Field), Florida, 14 April 1961

Detachment 1 deployed to Mali, West Africa (covername "Sandy Beach"), August 1961 (Dates undetermined)
Detachment 2 deployed to Bien Hoa AB, South Vietnam (covername "Farm Gate"), November 1961 (Dates undetermined), placed under operational control of 2d Air Division. Detachment 2A would be the B-26 Invader unit; Detachment 2B would be the T-28 Trojan unit.

- England AFB, Louisiana, 15 January 1966
- Eglin Air Force Auxiliary Field No. 9 (Hurlburt Field), Florida, 15 July 1969 to Present

== See also ==
- Commando
- Recondo School
