= 15th Special Operations Squadron =

15th Special Operations Squadron

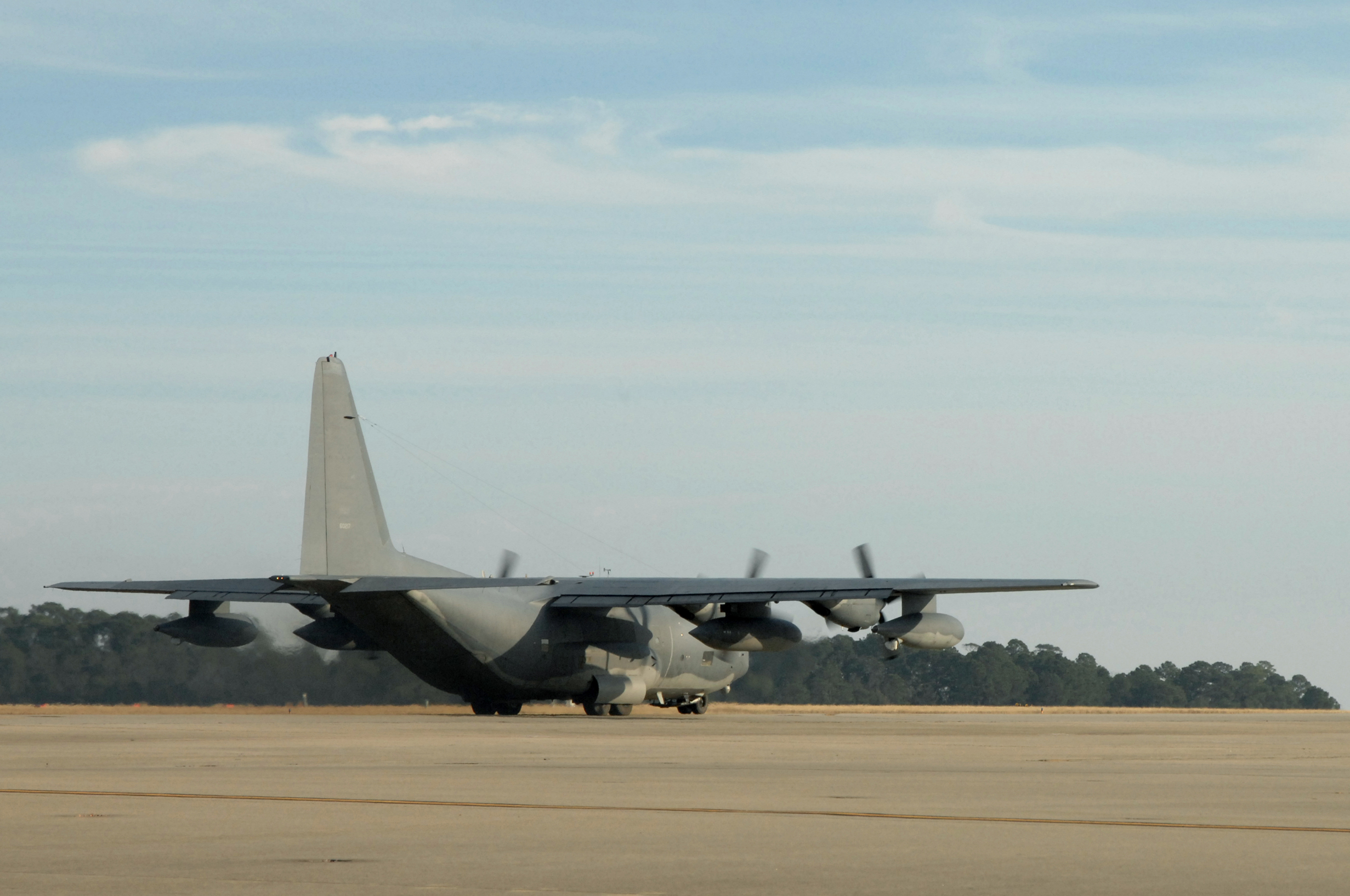
- A 15th Special Operations Squadron MC-130 deploys to Haiti to provide humanitarian and disaster relief
- Active: 1942–1943; 1944–1946; 1947–1949; 1968–1970; 1992–present
- Country: United States
- Branch: United States Air Force
- Role: Special Operations
- Part of: Air Force Special Operations Command
- Garrison/HQ: Hurlburt Field
- Nickname: Fightin 1-5
- Decorations: Distinguished Unit Citation; Presidential Unit Citation; Gallant Unit Citation; Air Force Outstanding Unit Award with Combat V device Republic of Vietnam Gallantry Cross with Palm

Commanders
- Current commander: Lt Col Charles D’Arcy
- Notable commanders: Tony D. Bauernfeind

Insignia
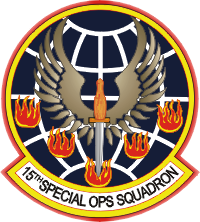
- 15th Special Operations Squadron emblem (Note: Approved 27 November 1992.)

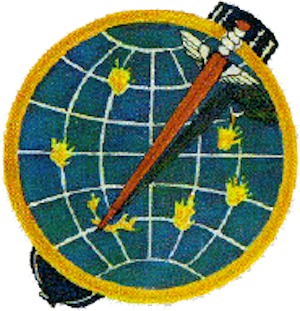
- 15th Bombardment Squadron emblem (Note: Approved 13 April 1945. Description: On a medium blue sphere, marked with white lines of latitude and longitude, within border yellow orange, a red sword winged and hilted white, striking surface of sphere with point in bomb burst impact mark at dexter base proper, and casting drop shadow on surface of sphere between five, like bomb bursts arranged two to dexter and three to sinister, all surmounting a large, dark blue aerial bomb, trimmed white, nose to dexter base.)

The 15th Special Operations Squadron is part of the 1st Special Operations Wing at Hurlburt Field, Florida. It operates Lockheed MC-130J Commando II aircraft in support of special operations.

The squadron was first activated in 1942 as the 520th Bombardment Squadron. It engaged in antisubmarine warfare operations as the 15th Antisubmarine Squadron off the Atlantic coast of the United States until 1943 when the Navy assumed responsibility for the mission. It was disbanded in the fall of that year.

In 1944, the 15th Bombardment Squadron, Very Heavy was activated as a Boeing B-29 Superfortress unit. It participated in combat operations against Japan in 1945, receiving a Distinguished Unit Citation. The squadron was inactivated on Guam in 1946. It was again briefly active in the Air Force Reserve from 1947 to 1949.

The 15th Special Operations Squadron was activated in Vietnam as a Lockheed C-130 Hercules gunship squadron. It participated in combat until it was inactivated in 1970, earning a Presidential Unit Citation, Air Force Outstanding Unit Award with Combat V device and Republic of Vietnam Gallantry Cross with Palm.

The 15th Antisubmarine Squadron and 15th Bombardment Squadron were consolidated with the 15th Special Operations Squadron in September 1985, but remained inactive until 1992, when the squadron again activated as a special operations C-130 unit.

== Mission ==
Global, day and night, adverse weather capability to insert, extract, and resupply special operations forces by low or high altitude airdrop or airland operations.

== History ==
=== World War II ===
==== Antisubmarine warfare ====
The first predecessor of the squadron was activated at Jacksonville Municipal Airport in late 1942 as the 520th Bombardment Squadron, one of the four original squadrons of the 378th Bombardment Group. The squadron apparently drew its cadre from the 18th Observation Squadron, which moved on paper from Jacksonville to Birmingham Army Air Field, Alabama the same day. (Note: The Hurlburt Fact Sheet states that the 18th Observation Squadron was redesignated the 15th Antisubmarine Squadron. This is contradicted by both Maurer and Dollman. Maurer, Combat Squadrons, p. 100; Dollman, AFHRA Factsheet 15 Special Operations Squadron.) It was originally equipped with a mixture of observation aircraft and medium bombers. Using these aircraft, the squadron began flying antisubmarine patrols off the Atlantic Coast.

AAF Antisubmarine Command soon reorganized, eliminating its groups and assigning its squadrons directly to its two wings. As a result, the squadron became the 15th Antisubmarine Squadron and was assigned to the 26th Antisubmarine Wing. Although assigned to the 25th Wing, the squadron flew most missions in the area north of its station, moving its operations to Langley Field, Virginia in 1943, so it was attached to the 25th Antisubmarine Wing until July 1943, when it moved its operations to Drew Field, Florida.

In July 1943, the AAF and Navy reached an agreement to transfer the coastal antisubmarine mission to the Navy. This mission transfer also included an exchange of AAF long-range bombers equipped for antisubmarine warfare for Navy Consolidated B-24 Liberators without such equipment. The squadron continued operations from Batista Field, Cuba until it was disbanded on 2 November 1943.

==== B-29 bombardment operations ====
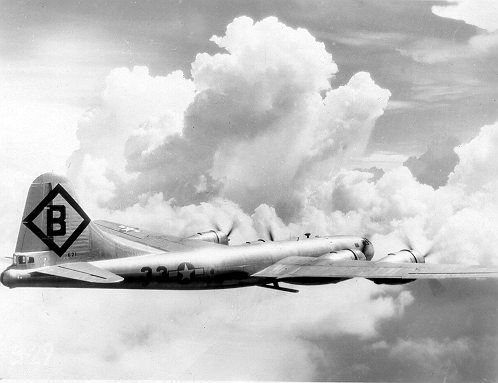
16th Bombardment Group b-29

The second predecessor of the squadron is the 15th Bombardment Squadron, Very Heavy, which was activated as part of the 16th Bombardment Group on 1 April 1944 at Dalhart Army Air Field, Texas as a Boeing B-29 Superfortress unit. It moved to Fairmont Army Air Field, Nebraska for training in August 1944 and received Bell B-29B Superfortresses designed for fast low-level bomb runs. The squadron deployed to the Pacific Theater of Operations, where it was stationed at Northwest Field, Guam under XXI Bomber Command's 315th Bombardment Wing. It flew very long range strategic bombardment missions over the Japanese Home Islands concentrating on oil industry targets, particularly refineries and coal liquification facilities (26 June – 14 August 1945). No B-29s from the squadron were lost during combat operations over Japan. The squadron was inactivated on Guam 15 April 1946.

=== Reserve operations ===
The 15th Bombardment Squadron was reactivated as a reserve unit at Hill Field, Utah on 1 August 1947, where it trained under the supervision of Air Defense Command (ADC)'s 402d AAF Base Unit (later 2344th Air Force Reserve Flying Training Center). Although the squadron was nominally a B-29 unit, it is not clear whether the squadron was fully staffed or equipped with operational aircraft. In 1948, Continental Air Command (ConAC) assumed responsibility for managing reserve and Air National Guard units from ADC. The 15th was inactivated when President Truman's reduced 1949 defense budget required reductions in the number of units in the Air Force, as reserve flying operations at Hill ceased.

=== Combat Talon ===
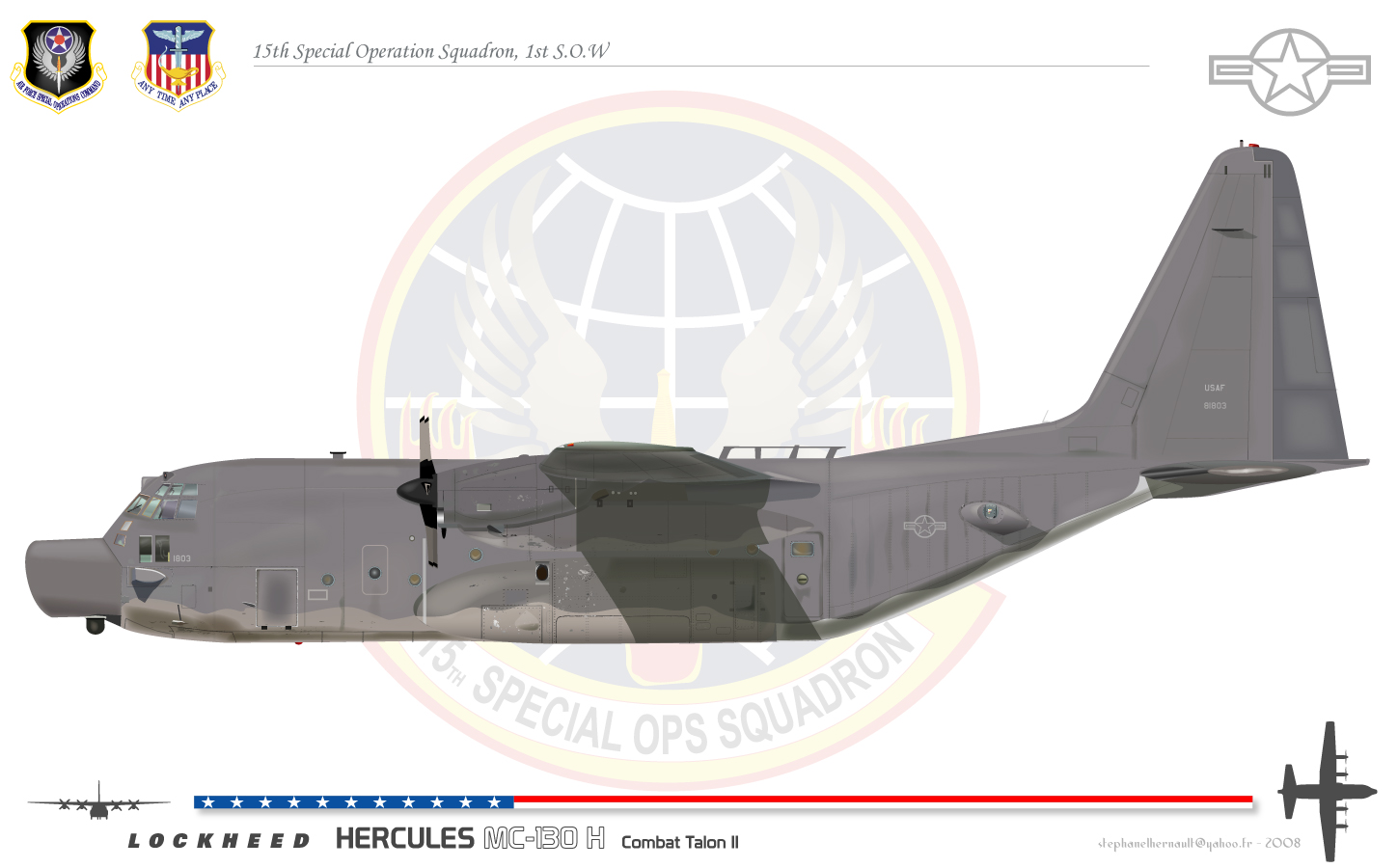
MC130H

The 15th Air Commando Squadron was activated for the Vietnam War at Nha Trang Air Base, South Vietnam, flying the C-130E (I) Combat Talon as part of the 14th Air Commando Wing. Combat Talon was first operational as Detachment 1, 314th Troop Carrier Wing beginning 1 September 1966, as a support unit for MACV-SOG. On 15 March 1968, the detachment was discontinued and replaced by the squadron, which became the 15th Special Operations Squadron on 1 August 1968. In Vietnam, the aircraft was used to drop leaflets over North Vietnam Army positions, and to insert and resupply special forces and indigenous units into hostile territory throughout Southeast Asia. Combat Talon crews operated unescorted at low altitudes and at night. It saw combat and performed special operations missions until 31 October 1970, when it was inactivated. The unit was consolidated with the 15th Antisubmarine Squadron and the 15th Bombardment Squadron in September 1985.

The 15th was reactivated on 1 October 1992, to operate the MC-130H Combat Talon II as part of the 1st Special Operations Wing.

== Lineage ==
15th Antisubmarine Squadron

- Constituted as the 520th Bombardment Squadron (Heavy) on 13 October 1942

Activated on 18 October 1942
Redesignated: 15th Antisubmarine Squadron (Heavy) on 29 November 1942
Disbanded on 2 November 1943

- Reconstituted on 19 September 1985 and consolidated with the 15th Bombardment Squadron and the 15th Special Operations Squadron as the 15th Special Operations Squadron

15th Bombardment Squadron
Constituted as the 15th Bombardment Squadron, Very Heavy on 28 March 1944
Activated on 1 April 1944
Inactivated on 15 April 1946
Activated in the Reserve on 1 August 1947
Inactivated on 27 June 1949

- Consolidated on 19 September 1985 and with the 15th Antisubmarine Squadron and the 15th Special Operations Squadron as the 15th Special Operations Squadron

15th Special Operations Squadron
Constituted as the 15th Air Commando Squadron and activated, on 13 February 1968 (not organized)
Organized on 15 March 1968
Redesignated 15th Special Operations Squadron on 1 August 1968
Inactivated on 31 October 1970

- Consolidated on 19 September 1985 and with the 15th Antisubmarine Squadron and the 15th Bombardment Operations Squadron
- Activated on 1 October 1992

=== Assignments ===
- 378th Bombardment Group, 18 October 1942 (attached to 25th Antisubmarine Wing after 20 November 1942)
- 26th Antisubmarine Wing, 14 December 1942 (attached to 25th Antisubmarine Wing until c. July 1943)
- Second Air Force, 15 October - 2 November 1943
- 16th Bombardment Group, 1 April 1944 – 15 April 1946
- 445th Bombardment Group, 1 August 1947 – 27 June 1949
- Pacific Air Forces, 13 February 1968 (not organized)
- 14th Air Commando Wing (later 14th Special Operations Wing), 15 March 1968 – 31 October 1970
- 1st Special Operations Group (later 16th Operations Group, 1st Special Operations Group), 1 October 1992 – present

=== Stations ===
- Jacksonville Municipal Airport (Later Jacksonville Army Air Field), Florida, 18 October 1942 (air echelon operated from: Langley Field, Virginia, 3 June – 3 July 1943; Drew Field, Florida, July 1943; Batista Field, Cuba, c. 25 July – c. 1 October 1943)
- Wendover Field, Utah, 17 October – 2 November 1943.
- Dalhart Army Air Field, Texas, 1 April 1944
- Fairmont Army Air Field, Nebraska, 15 August 1944 – 7 March 1945 (air echelon operated from: Borinquen Field, Puerto Rico, c. 9–25 January 1945)
- Northwest Field, Guam, 14 April 1945 – 15 April 1946
- Hill Field (later Hill Air Force Base), Utah, 1 August 1947 – 27 June 1949
- Nha Trang Air Base, South Vietnam, 15 March 1968 – 31 October 1970.
- Hurlburt Field, Florida, 1 October 1992 – present

=== Aircraft operated ===
- North American O-47 (1942)
- North American B-25 Mitchell (1942–1943)
- Lockheed B-34 Lexington (1943)
- Consolidated B-24 Liberator (1943)
- Boeing B-17 Flying Fortress (1944–1945)
- Boeing B-29B Superfortress (1944–1946)
- Lockheed C-130E(I) Combat Talon (1968–1970)
- Lockheed MC-130H Combat Talon II (1992–2023)
- Lockheed MC-130J Commando II (2022-present)

=== Awards and campaigns ===
Award streamer	Award	Dates	Notes
	Distinguished Unit Citation	29 July–6 August 1945	Japan 15th Bombardment Squadron
	Presidential Unit Citation	15 March 1968–15 November 1970 (Note: Dollman gives the start date for this award as 1 January 1966, but the squadron was not active then.)	15th Air Commando Squadron (later 15th Special Operations Squadron)
	Presidential Unit Citation	21 June 1968–30 June 1969	15th Special Operations Squadron
	Gallant Unit Citation	6 October 2001–30 May 2003	15th Special Operations Squadron
	Air Force Meritorious Unit Award	1 July 2007–30 June 2009	15th Special Operations Squadron
	Air Force Meritorious Unit Award	1 October 2009–30 September 2011	15th Special Operations Squadron
	Air Force Outstanding Unit Award with Combat "V" Device	15 March–20 June 1968	15th Air Commando Squadron
	Air Force Outstanding Unit Award with Combat "V" Device	1 July–31 October 1970	15th Special Operations Squadron
	Air Force Outstanding Unit Award with Combat "V" Device	1 June 1997–31 May 1999	15th Special Operations Squadron
	Air Force Outstanding Unit Award with Combat "V" Device	1 July 2003–30 June 2005	15th Special Operations Squadron
	Air Force Outstanding Unit Award with Combat "V" Device	1 September 2006–30 June 2007	15th Special Operations Squadron
	Air Force Outstanding Unit Award with Combat "V" Device	1 October 2011–30 September 2013	15th Special Operations Squadron
	Air Force Outstanding Unit Award with Combat "V" Device	1 October 2013–30 September 2015	15th Special Operations Squadron
	Air Force Outstanding Unit Award	1 October 1992–15 April 1994	15th Special Operations Squadron
	Air Force Outstanding Unit Award	1 June 1995–31 May 1997	15th Special Operations Squadron
	Air Force Outstanding Unit Award	1 July 1999–30 June 2001	15th Special Operations Squadron
	Air Force Outstanding Unit Award	1 July 2001–30 June 2003	15th Special Operations Squadron
	Air Force Outstanding Unit Award	1 September 2004–31 August 2006	15th Special Operations Squadron
	Vietnamese Gallantry Cross with Palm	15 March 1968–31 October 1970	15th Air Commando Squadron (later 15th Special Operations Squadron)
