= 916th Expeditionary Air Refueling Squadron =

916th Expeditionary Air Refueling Squadron

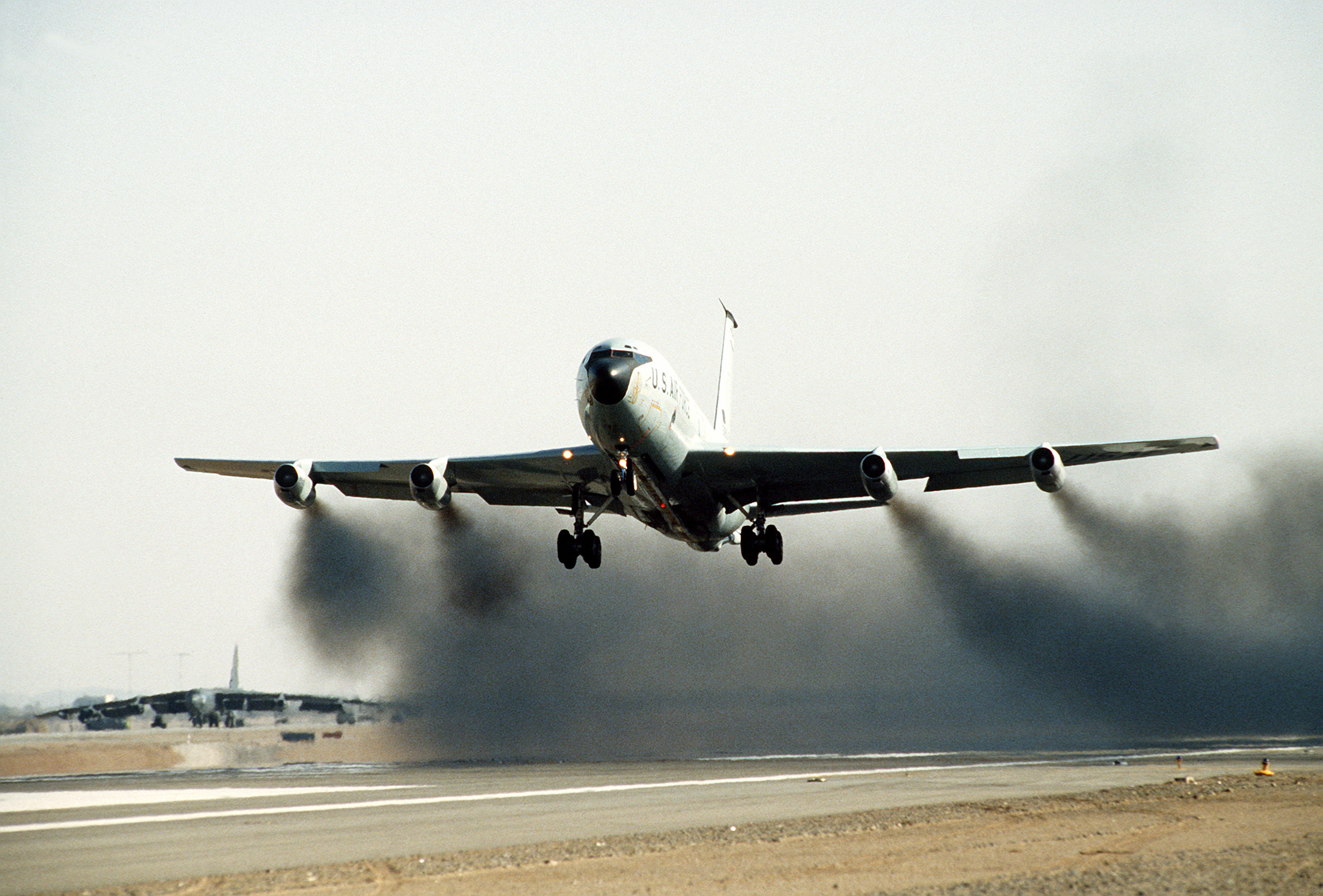
- Boeing KC-135 Stratotanker using water injection on takeoff
- Active: 1944–1946; 1958–1983; 2003–2003
- Country: United States
- Branch: United States Air Force
- Role: Air refueling
- Part of: Air Combat Command
- Decorations: Distinguished Unit Citation

Insignia
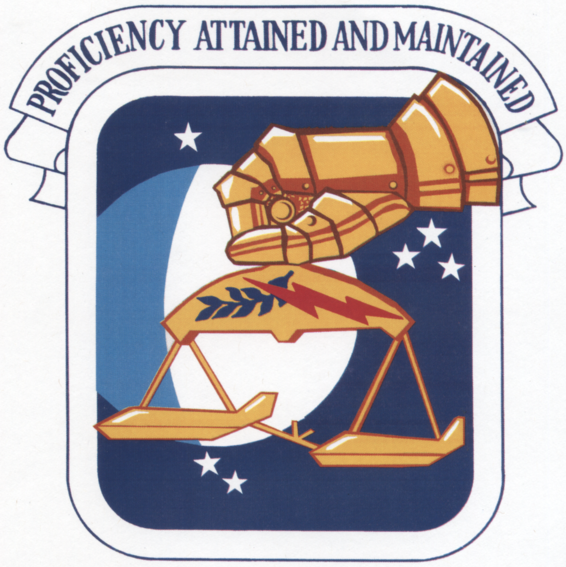
- 916th Air Refueling Squadron emblem (Note: Approved 9 January 1962.)

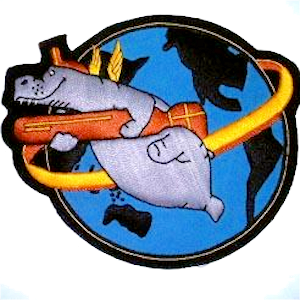
- 16th Bombardment Squadron emblem (Note: Approved 3 August 1945. Description: A large gray, caricatured hippopotamus, winged light yellow orange, wearing a brown fatigue cap, and holding a large, brown and yellow aerial bomb under the forelegs, while running toward dexter, in front of and around a large blue sphere marked with black land areas and encircled by a yellow and brown ribbon.)

The 916th Expeditionary Air Refueling Squadron is a provisional United States Air Force unit. The squadron was first activated late in World War II as the 16th Bombardment Squadron, Very Heavy, a Boeing B-29 Superfortress unit. After training with Second Air Force, the squadron moved to Guam, where it participated in the strategic bombing campaign against Japan. It earned a Distinguished Unit Citation in July 1945. After the war it remained on Guam until August 1946, when it was inactivated.

The 916th Air Refueling Squadron was activated at Travis in 1958 when the 5th Bombardment Wing participated in the Strategic Air Command program to disperse its bomber force over a larger number of bases to reduce vulnerability to a first strike. The squadron remained at Travis after the 5th wing moved to Minot Air Force Base, North Dakota. It maintained an alert status during the Cold War and participated in contingency operations until being inactivated.

The squadron was converted to provisional status and redesignated the 916th Expeditionary Air Refueling Squadron in January 2003. It was active for a brief period that year in Bahrain.

== History ==
=== World War II ===
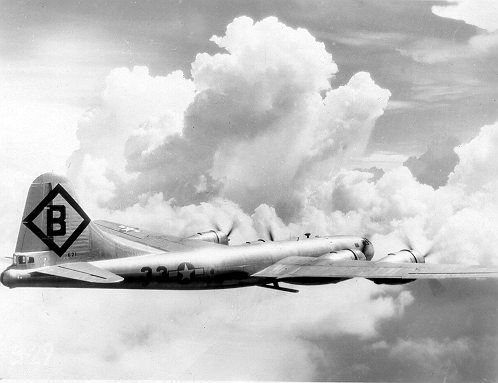
B-29 of the 16th Bombardment Group

The squadron was first activated on 1 April 1944, at Dalhart Army Air Field, Texas as the 16th Bombardment Squadron, Very Heavy, one of the four original squadrons of the 16th Bombardment Group. It was equipped with Boeing B-17 Flying Fortresses for training, due to shortage of Boeing B-29 Superfortresses. The ground echelon moved to Fairmont Army Air Field, Kansas, in August 1944, while the air echelon trained with the Army Air Forces School of Applied Tactics at Orlando Army Air Base, Florida before joining them at Fairmont.

After completion of training the unit deployed to the central Pacific area in the spring of 1945, where it became part of XXI Bomber Command at Northwest Field (Guam). The squadron entered combat on 16 June 1945 with a bombing raid against an airfield on Moen. It flew its first mission against the Japanese home islands on 26 June 1945 and afterwards operated principally against the enemy's petroleum industry. Between 29 July and 5 August 1945, the unit flew a series of unescorted missions against the oil refinery at Shimotsu, The Mitsubishi refinery and oil installations at Kawasaki and coal liquifaction plants at Ube in the face of strong enemy opposition. For these missions, the 16th earned a Distinguished Unit Citation.

The unit flew its last combat mission on 15 August 1945, after which it airdropped food and supplies to Allied prisoners of war in Japan, Manchuria and Korea. It flew in several show of force missions, including one on 2 September 1945 over Tokyo Bay during formal Japanese Surrender. After the war, the unit flew long distance transport missions back to the United States. In February 1946, squadron personnel were transferred to the 501st Bombardment Group and the squadron was inactivated on Guam 15 April 1946.

=== Cold War ===
The 916th Air Refueling Squadron was activated on 1 September 1959, by Strategic Air Command (SAC) at Travis Air Force Base, California and equipped with Boeing KC-135 Stratotankers. The 5th Bombardment Wing had recently converted to Boeing B-52 Stratofortress bombers and had transferred two of its bomber squadrons to other bases in a SAC program to disperse its Boeing B-52 Stratofortress bombers over a larger number of bases, thus making it more difficult for the Soviet Union to knock out the entire fleet with a surprise first strike. The squadron mission was to provide air refueling to the remaining B-52s of its parent wing and other Air Force units as directed. Starting in 1960, one third of the squadron's aircraft were maintained on fifteen-minute alert, fully fueled and ready for combat to reduce vulnerability to a Soviet missile strike. This was increased to half the squadron's aircraft in 1962. The unit continued to maintain an alert commitment until shortly before inactivation except for periods when it supported contingencies or deployed aircraft. The squadron deployed crews and planes to the Young Tiger Task Force in Thailand and from its west coast location frequently supported deployments of Tactical Air Command fighters across the Pacific. It also supported Tanker Task Forces located at Eielson Air Force Base, Alaska; Anderson Air Force Base, Guam; RAF Mildenhall, England and Torrejon Air Base, Spain.

The 916th was reassigned to the 14th Strategic Aerospace Division at Beale Air Force Base, California in 1968 when the 5th Bombardment Wing moved on paper to Minot Air Force Base, North Dakota. Between March 1970 and April 1972 It was assigned to the 47th Air Division at Fairchild Air Force Base, but it then returned to the control of the 14th Air Division. From 1972 to 1975, Marcelite J. Harris, the first female African-American general officer in the United States Air Force, served as field maintenance supervisor with the squadron. General Harris had just become the first female certified maintenance officer in the Air Force when she served with the 916th.

The squadron was also called on to support Air Force test and development programs. In 1974, a squadron tanker participated in the first long range overwater refueling of a Lockheed C-5 Galaxy. During 1976 the squadron helped test the compatibility of KC-135s with Rockwell B-1 Lancers. In that same year it participated in the initial operational testing and evaluation of the Boeing E-3 Sentry. Five years later it provided refueling support for B-52s testing the AGM-86 Air Launched Cruise Missile.

On 1 July 1977, the 916th was assigned to the 307th Air Refueling Group. In 1979, the group earned the Spaatz Trophy as the best air refueling organization in the Air Force. The squadron and group were inactivated on 31 Oct 1983 and the majority of its aircraft were transferred to Carswell Air Force Base due to a shift in air refueling requirements that required better coverage for SAC conventional forces in the southeastern United States. In its twenty-four-year history, the squadron had never experienced a single aircraft accident. At the dinner marking the squadron's inactivation it was announced that a squadron crew was the winner of the 1983 air refueling crew of the year award.

The 916th Air Refueling Squadron and the 16th Bombardment Squadron were consolidated into a single unit on 19 September 1985.

=== Expeditionary operations ===
In January 2003, the squadron was redesignated the 916th Expeditionary Air Refueling Squadron and assigned to Air Mobility Command to activate or inactivate as needed for contingency operations. Two months later, it was transferred to Air Combat Command, which activated it briefly at Sheikh Isa Air Base, Bahrain.

== Lineage ==
16th Bombardment Squadron, Very Heavy

- Constituted as the 16th Bombardment Squadron, Very Heavy on 28 March 1944

Activated on 1 April 1944
Inactivated on 15 April 1946

- Consolidated with the 916th Air Refueling Squadron as the 916th Air Refueling Squadron on 19 September 1985

916th Expeditionary Air Refueling Squadron

- Constituted as the 916th Air Refueling Squadron, Heavy on 9 March 1959

Activated on 1 September 1959
Inactivated on 1 October 1983

- Consolidated with the 16th Bombardment Squadron on 19 September 1985
- Converted to provisional status and redesignated 916th Expeditionary Air Refueling Squadron on 23 January 2003

Activated on 20 March 2003
Inactivated on 9 May 2003

=== Assignments ===
- 16th Bombardment Group, 1 April 1944 – 15 April 1946
- 5th Bombardment Wing 1 September 1959
- 14th Strategic Aerospace Division, 25 July 1968
- 47th Air Division, 31 March 1970
- 14th Air Division, 1 April 1972
- 307th Air Refueling Group, 1 July 1977 – 1 October 1983
- Air Mobility Command to activate or inactivate as required, 23 January 2003
- Air Combat Command to activate or inactivate as required, 19 March 2003

384th Expeditionary Operations Group, 20 March–9 May 2003

=== Stations ===
- Dalhart Army Air Field, Texas, 1 April 1944
- Fairmont Army Airfield, Nebraska, 15 August 1944 – 7 March 1945
- Northwest Field, Guam, 14 April 1945 – 15 April 1946
- Travis Air Force Base, California 1 September 1959 – 1 October 1983
- Sheikh Isa Air Base, Bahrain, 20 March–9 May 2003

=== Aircraft ===
- Boeing B-17 Flying Fortress, 1944
- Boeing B-29B Superfortress, 1944–1946
- Boeing KC-135A Stratotanker, 1959–1983

=== Awards and campaigns ===
Award streamer	Award	Dates	Notes
	Presidential Unit Citation	19 Jul 1945–6 August 1945	Japan, 16th Bombardment Squadron

Campaign Streamer	Campaign	Dates	Notes
	Air Offensive, Japan	14 April 1945 – 2 September 1945	16th Bombardment Squadron
	Western Pacific	17 April 1945 – 2 September 1945	16th Bombardment Squadron
	Eastern Mandates	14 April 1945	16th Bombardment Squadron

== See also ==
- List of United States Air Force air refueling squadrons
- List of B-29 units of the United States Air Force
