= 319th Special Operations Squadron =

319th Special Operations Squadron

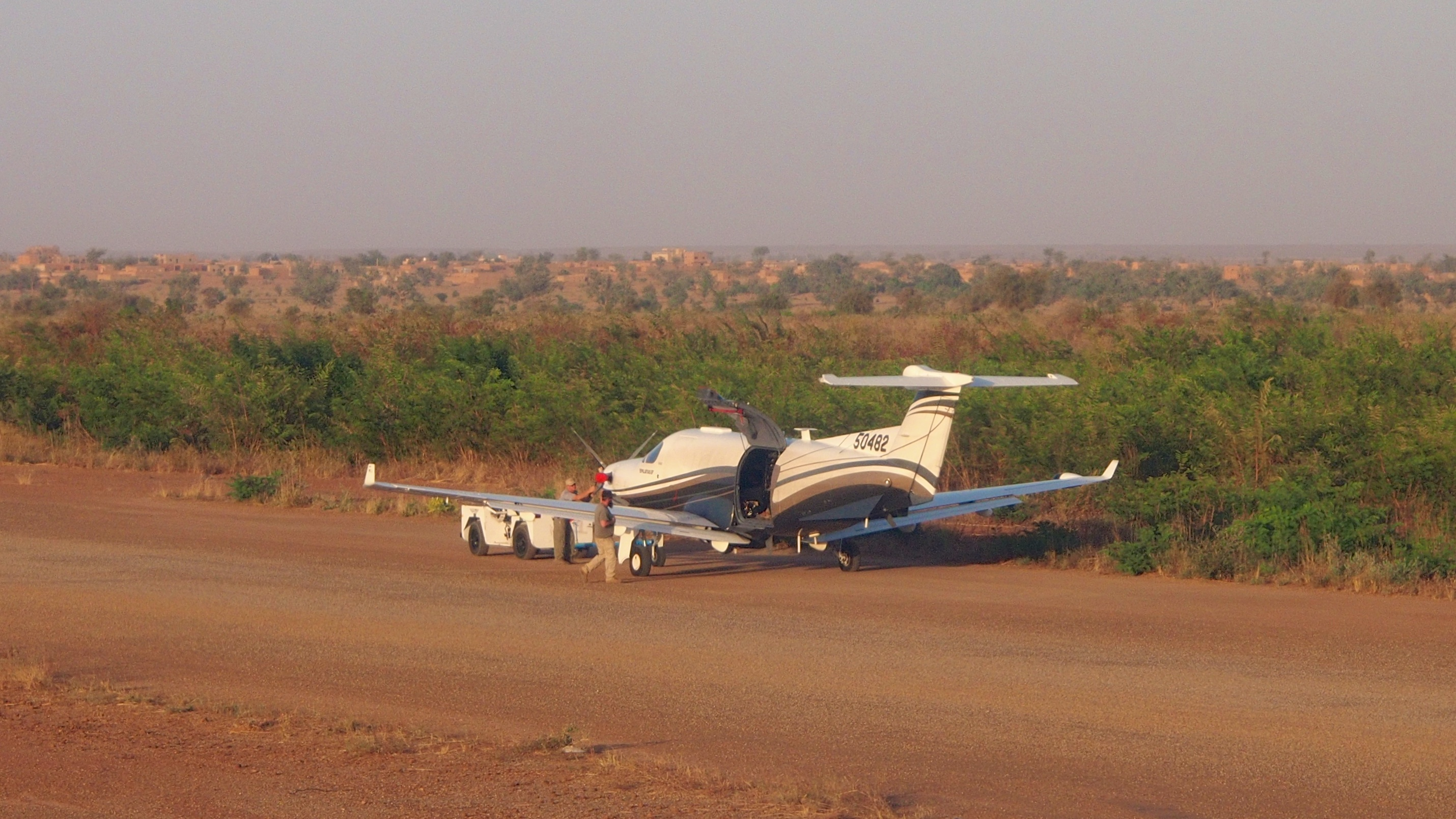
- USAF Pilatus U-28 at Niamey Airport, Niger
- Active: 1944–1945; 1962–1972; 2005–present
- Country: United States
- Branch: United States Air Force
- Role: Special Operations
- Part of: Air Force Special Operations Command
- Garrison/HQ: Hurlburt Field, Florida

Commanders
- Current commander: Lt. Col. Caitlin Reilly

Insignia
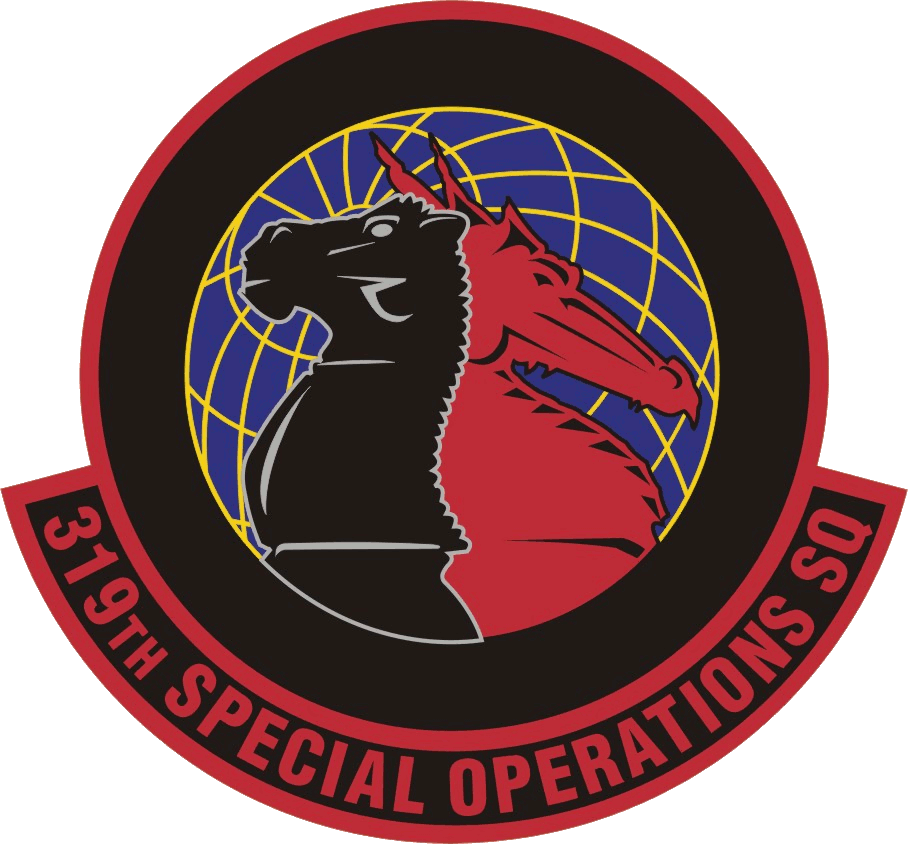
- 319th Special Operations Squadron emblem (approved 21 June 2006)

The 319th Special Operations Squadron is a special operations unit of the United States Air Force (USAF) under the command of the United States Air Force Special Operations Command. The unit was first activated in September 1944 as the 319th Troop Carrier Squadron (Commando) and served in the China-Burma-India Theater during World War II. It provided airlift support and conducted airborne drops and glider operations for Allied troops in Burma, central China, and French Indochina in the last year of World War II.

The squadron was activated in April 1962 at Hurlburt Field, Florida and deployed planes and crews from Hurlburt for special air warfare and civic actions missions, then trained aircrews on special operations airlift at England Air Force Base, Louisiana until being inactivated as the 319th Special Operations Squadron in June 1972.

On 1 October 2005, the squadron was again activated as part of an overall expansion of the Air Force Special Operations Command. It operates the Pilatus U-28A Draco.

== Mission ==
The 319th Special Operations Squadron mission is to provide intra-theater support for special operations forces and it is currently equipped with the U-28A Draco, a modified version of the Pilatus PC-12. The U-28A was selected for its versatile performance and ability to operate from short and unimproved runway surfaces.

== History ==
=== World War II ===
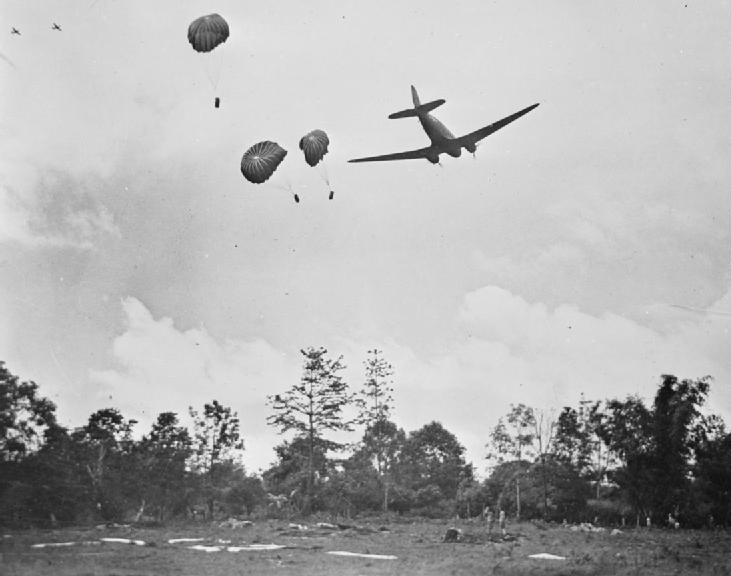
C47 releases rations near Myitkyina, Burma

The 319th was first activated in India as the 319th Troop Carrier Squadron (Commando) in September 1944. The squadron served in the China-Burma-India Theater during World War II. It provided airlift support and flew aerial resupply missions in support of various commando units, such as Merrill's Marauders and the Chindits and conducted airborne drops and glider operations for Allied troops in Burma, central China, and French Indochina in the last year of World War II. After the end of the war, the squadron moved to China, where it continued operations until October 1945. In November 1945, the squadron returned on paper to India, but was not manned or equipped. It was inactivated there in December 1945.

=== Vietnam War ===
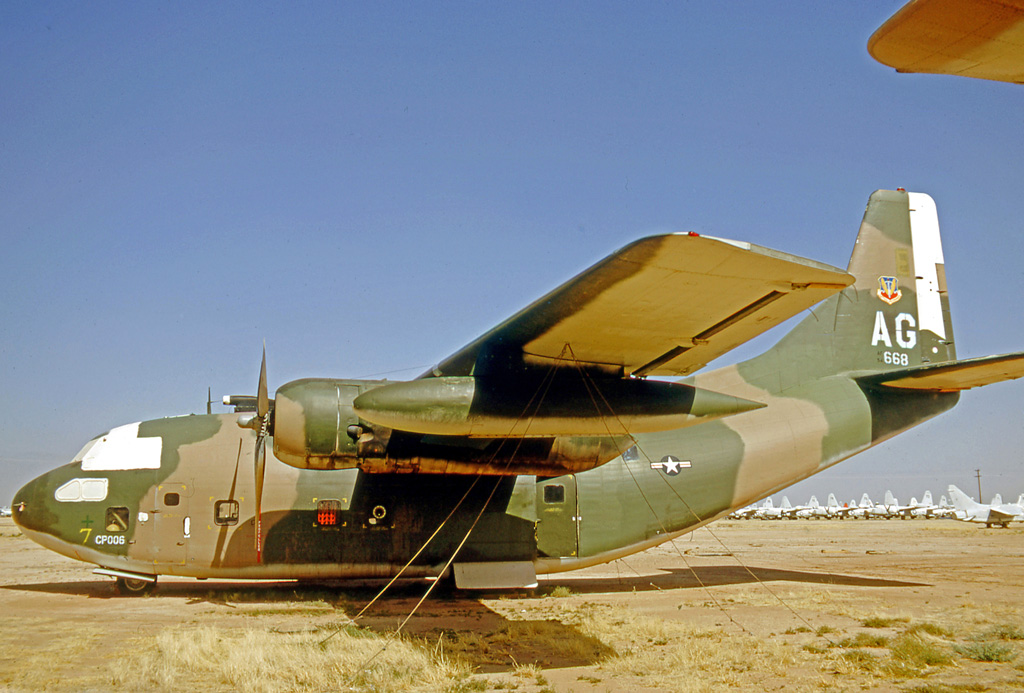
C-123K Provider formerly of the 319th Special Operations Squadron

The squadron was redesignated the 319th Troop Carrier Squadron, Commando, and organized at Hurlburt Field, Florida in April 1962. The squadron initially operated Curtiss C-46 Commandos, but also Douglas C-47 Skytrains, and Helio U-10 Courier, and North American T-28 Trojans until moving to England Air Force Base, Louisiana in 1966. The squadron frequently deployed crews and airplanes to Southeast Asia for civic action and counterinsurgency missions.

At England, the squadron concentrated on training United States and foreign aircrews with the Fairchild C-123 Provider. It continued this mission after returning to Hurlburt three years later. It was inactivated in 1972 as the Air Force reduced its size following United States withdrawal from the Vietnam War.

=== Present era ===
On 1 October 2005, the squadron was again activated as part of an overall expansion of the Air Force Special Operations Command. It was equipped with the U-28A Draco, a modified version of the Pilatus PC-12, able to operate from short and unimproved runway surfaces. The 319th provides airlift support to United States Army Special Forces, and provides intratheater support for special operations.

== Lineage ==
- Constituted as the 319th Troop Carrier Squadron (Commando) on 9 August 1944

Activated on 1 September 1944

- Redesignated 319th Troop Carrier Squadron on 29 September 1945

Inactivated on 27 December 1945

- Redesignated 319th Troop Carrier Squadron, Commando and activated on 18 April 1962 (not organized)

Organized on 27 April 1962

- Redesignated 319th Air Commando Squadron, Troop Carrier on 8 November 1964
- Redesignated 319th Air Commando Squadron, Tactical Airlift on 1 May 1967
- Redesignated 319th Special Operations Squadron on 8 July 1968

Inactivated on 15 January 1972
Activated on 1 October 2005

=== Assignments ===
- 1st Air Commando Group, 1 September 1944
- 69th Composite Wing, 2 September 1945
- Tenth Air Force, c. 27 September 1945 – 27 December 1945
- Tactical Air Command, 18 April 1962 (not organized)
- 1st Air Commando Group (later 1st Air Commando Wing, 1st Special Operations Wing), 27 Apr 1962
- 4410th Combat Crew Training Wing, 15 July 1969
- 1st Special Operations Wing, 30 July 1969 – 15 January 1972
- 16th Special Operations Group (later 1st Special Operations Group), 1 October 2005 – 3 May 2024
- 492nd Special Operations Wing, 3 May 2024 - Present

=== Stations ===
- Asansol, India, 1 September 1944 (operated from various forward bases in Burma, 4 December 1944 – 17 May 1945)
- Warazup, Burma, 27 May 1945
- Loping, China, 2 September 1945
- Hu Hsien, China, 7 October 1945
- India, c. 1 November 1945 – 27 December 1945
- Eglin Air Force Auxiliary Field No. 9 (Hurlburt Field), Florida, 27 April 1962
- England Air Force Base, Louisiana, 15 January 1966
- Eglin Air Force Auxiliary Field No. 9 (Hurlburt Field), Florida, 30 July 1969 – 15 January 1972
- Hurlburt Field, Florida, 1 October 2005 – present

=== Aircraft ===
- Douglas C-47 Skytrain, 1944–1945, 1962–1966
- Waco CG-4A, 1944–1945
- Curtiss C-46 Commando, 1962–1964
- Helio U-10 Courier, 1963–1966
- Fairchild C-123 Provider, 1963–1972
- North American T-28 Trojan, 1965
- Pilatus U-28A, 2005–present

=== Awards and campaigns ===
Award streamer	Award	Dates	Notes
	Air Force Outstanding Unit Award with Combat V device	1 September 2006 – 30 June 2007	319th Special Operations Squadron
	Air Force Outstanding Unit Award	July 1963–June 1965	319th Troop Carrier Squadron (later 319th Air Commando Squadron)
	Air Force Outstanding Unit Award	1 July 1969 – 15 April 1971	319th Special Operations Squadron
	Air Force Outstanding Unit Award	1 [October 2005]–31 August 2006	319th Special Operations Squadron
	Air Force Outstanding Unit Award	1 July 2007 – 30 June 2009	319th Special Operations Squadron

Campaign Streamer	Campaign	Dates	Notes
	India-Burma	1 September 1944 – 28 January 1945	319th Troop Carrier Squadron
	Central Burma	29 January 1945 – 15 July 1945	319th Troop Carrier Squadron
	China Defensive	1 September 1944 – 4 May 1945	319th Troop Carrier Squadron
	China Offensive	5 May 1945 – 2 September 1945	319th Troop Carrier Squadron
