= 23rd Special Operations Weather Squadron =

- Active: 1943–1944; 2009–present
- Country: United States
- Branch: United States Air Force
- Type: Special Operations Force
- Role: Special Operations Weather
- Part of: 1st Special Operations Wing; 1st Special Operations Group
- Garrison/HQ: Hurlburt Field
- Engagements: War in Afghanistan
- Decorations: Air Force Meritorious Unit Award; Air Force Outstanding Unit Award

Insignia
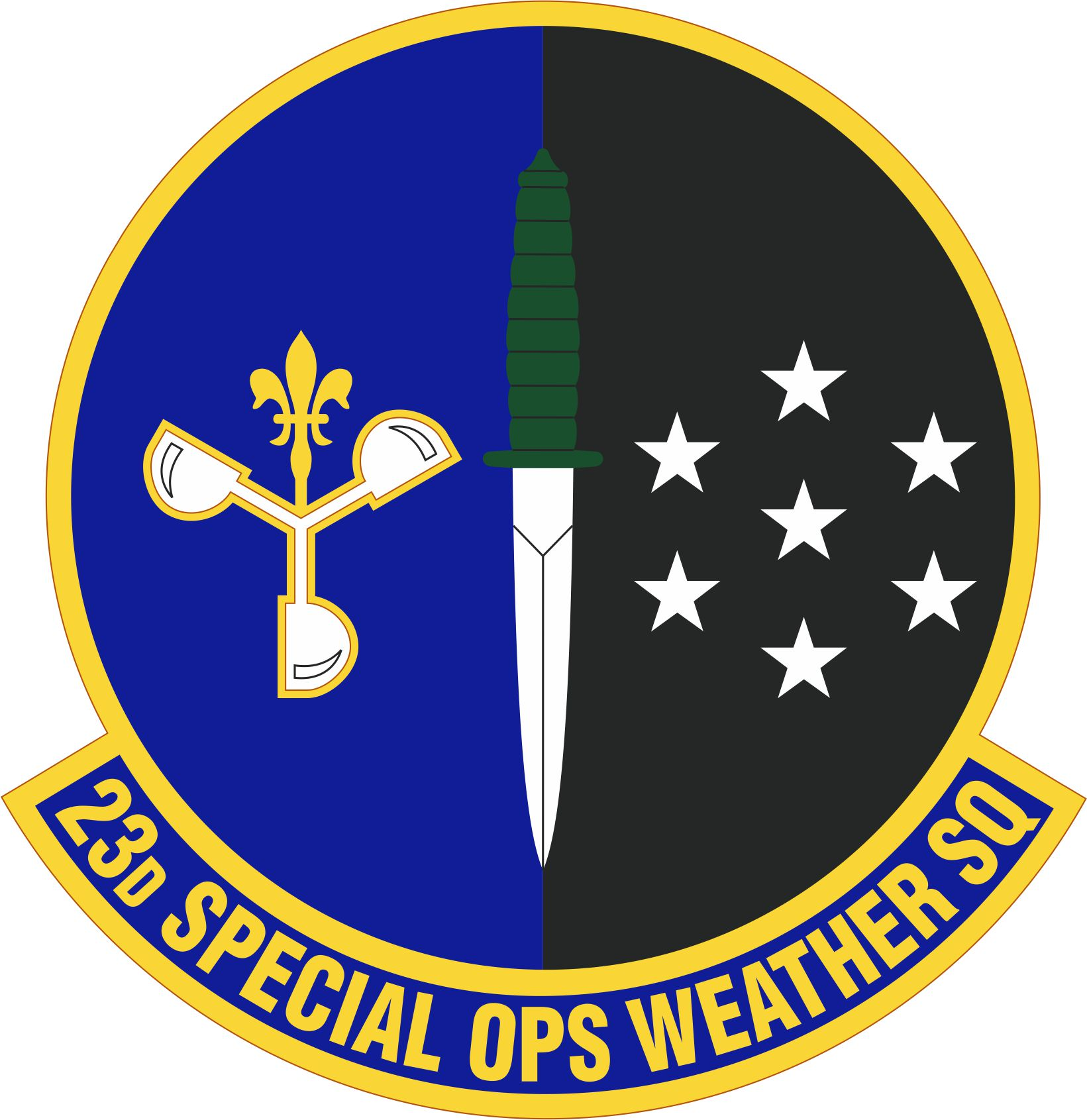
- 23rd Special Operations Weather Squadron emblem (approved 29 August 2013)

The 23rd Special Operations Weather Squadron (23rd SOWS) is a weather squadron of the United States Air Force Special Operations Command, based at Hurlburt Field with the 1st Special Operations Group (1st SOG) of the 1st Special Operations Wing.

It was originally constituted and activated as the 23rd Weather Squadron (Regional Control Headquarters) in late 1943 during World War II, and spent most of its service at Kansas City, Missouri until disbanding in early September 1944. The 23rd Weather Squadron was reactivated at Hurlburt Field in 2009 as part of the Air Force Special Operations Command's Twenty-Third Air Force and in 2013 transferred to the 1st SOG, gaining its current title.

== History ==
=== World War II ===
The squadron was first constituted as the 23rd Weather Squadron (Regional Control Headquarters) on 28 October 1943. It was activated on 1 November, part of the Army Air Forces Weather Service at San Antonio, under the command of Lieutenant Colonel Diran Arakelian. The 23rd relocated to Kansas City, Missouri, on 8 November, remaining there until its disbandment on 7 September 1944. Its personnel joined its replacement, the 72nd Army Air Forces Base Unit (23rd Weather Region).

=== Special Operations unit ===
The squadron was reconstituted and redesignated as the 23rd Weather Squadron on 3 June 2009, and activated a month later with the Twenty-Third Air Force at Hurlburt Field. The 23rd was created to address the increasing Special Forces demands for weather forecasting. Between 27 July and 9 August 2011 the squadron provided forecasting support for a United States Army conventional battalion-sized unit delivering humanitarian aid against insurgent resistance to isolated areas of Kunar and Nuristan Provinces during the War in Afghanistan.

It was attached to the 1st Special Operations Group of the 1st Special Operations Wing on 31 July 2012, and the attachment became permanent on 28 March 2013, when the squadron became the 23rd Special Operations Weather Squadron. It is responsible for providing weather forecasting for special operations forces in the planning and execution phases of operations. Detachment 1, 23rd SOWS at Fort Campbell supports the 160th Special Operations Aviation Regiment. On 29 August 2017, the weather flight of the 1st Special Operations Support Squadron was transferred to the 23rd SOWS.

== Lineage ==
- Constituted as the 23rd Weather Squadron (Regional Control Headquarters) on 28 October 1943

Activated on 1 November 1943
Disbanded on 7 September 1944

- Reconstituted and redesignated 23rd Weather Squadron on 3 June 2009

Activated on 3 July 2009
Redesignated 23rd Special Operations Weather Squadron on 28 March 2013

=== Assignments ===
- Army Air Forces Weather Service, 1 November 1943 – 7 September 1944
- Twenty-Third Air Force (Air Forces Special Operations Forces), 3 July 2009 (attached to 1st Special Operations Group, 31 July 2012)
- 1st Special Operations Group, 28 March 2013–present

=== Stations ===
- San Antonio, 1 November 1943
- Kansas City, Missouri, 8 November 1943 – 7 September 1944
- Hurlburt Field, 3 July 2009–present

=== Awards ===
| Award streamer | Award | Dates | Notes |
|---|---|---|---|
| | Air Force Meritorious Unit Award | 3 July–30 September 2009 | 23rd Weather Squadron |
| | Air Force Meritorious Unit Award | 1 October 2011–30 September 2013 | 23rd Special Operations Weather Squadron |
| | Air Force Meritorious Unit Award | 1 October 2013–30 September 2015 | 23rd Special Operations Weather Squadron |
| | Air Force Outstanding Unit Award | 1 October 2009–30 September 2011 | 23rd Weather Squadron |
