= 11th Special Operations Intelligence Squadron =

11th Special Operations Intelligence Squadron

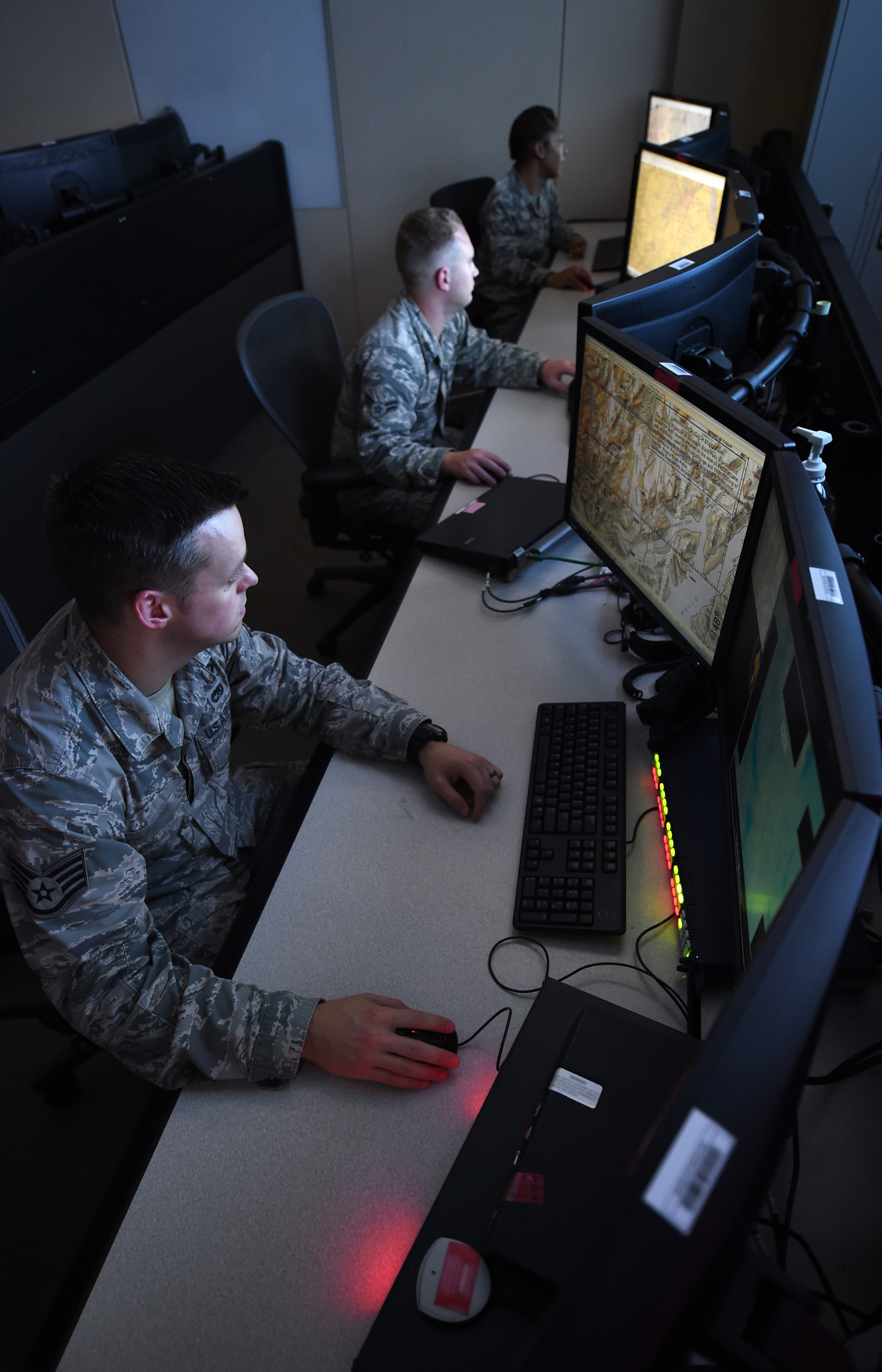
- Analysts assigned to the 11th Intelligence Squadron review mission data
- Active: 1943–1946; 1948–1949; 1953–1955; 2006–present
- Country: United States
- Branch: United States Air Force
- Role: Intelligence
- Part of: United States Special Operations Command
- Garrison/HQ: Hurlburt Field, Florida
- Motto: Persequor Furtim Hostis Latin Stalk the Enemy
- Engagements: Southwest Pacific Theater
- Decorations: Air Force Meritorious Unit Award; Air Force Outstanding Unit Award; Philippine Presidential Unit Citation

Commanders
- Current commander: Lt Col Derick Gee

Insignia
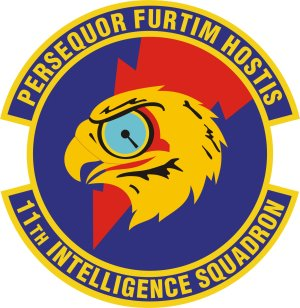
- 11th Intelligence Squadron emblem (approved 15 December 1953)

The 11th Special Operations Intelligence Squadron is an intelligence unit of the United States Air Force. It provides tailored full-motion video processing, exploitation and dissemination for special operations forces engaged in both combat and non-combat operations worldwide.

== History ==
=== Predecessors ===
==== 5th Photographic Technical Squadron ====
The first predecessor of the squadron, the 5th Photographic Technical Squadron was activated at Will Rogers Field, Oklahoma. After about four months of training under III Reconnaissance Command, the squadron deployed to New Guinea, where it was assigned to the 91st Photographic Wing. It saw combat with the 91st Wing as Far East Air Forces advanced through the Philippines and Ryuku Islands toward Japan. Following V-J Day, the squadron returned to the Philippines, where it was inactivated in 1946.

The squadron was activated in the reserves at Long Beach Airport in August 1949, although it is not clear to what extent the unit was manned or equipped. President Truman's reduced 1949 defense budget required reductions in the number of units in the Air Force, Combined with the conversion of reserve units to the wing/base organization, this resulted in the inactivation of the 5th in June 1949.

==== 99th Reconnaissance Technical Squadron ====
In January 1953, the 111th Strategic Reconnaissance Wing, a Pennsylvania Air National Guard unit that had been mobilized for the Korean War was returned to state control. In its place, Strategic Air Command (SAC) activated the regular 99th Strategic Reconnaissance Wing at Fairchild Air Force Base, Washington. As part of this action, the mission, personnel and equipment of the 111th Reconnaissance Technical Squadron were transferred to the newly activated 99th Reconnaissance Technical Squadron. The squadron processed and distributed reconnaissance products produced by the wing.

On 16 June 1954 the 99th Wing, along with SAC's other Convair B-36 Peacemaker reconnaissance wings, was assigned bombing as its primary mission, although it retained its designation as a reconnaissance wing until 1955. and its planes retained a reconnaissance capability. The 99th Reconnaissance Technical Squadron was inactivated in April 1955, and its assets were transferred to the 4199th Reconnaissance Technical Squadron, which was assigned to the 57th Air Division, but attached to the 99th Bombardment Wing until the wing left Fairchild in September 1956.

=== Activation as intelligence squadron ===
In October 1984, the 5th Photographic Technical Squadron and the 99th Reconnaissance Technical Squadron were consolidated as the 11th Reconnaissance Technical Squadron, but were never active under that name. In the summer of 2006, the consolidated squadron was redesignated the 11th Intelligence Squadron and assigned to Air Force Special Operations Command for activation.

The squadron was activated in August 2006, to provide tailored dedicated intelligence support to special operations forces. It was the first imagery and full-motion video intelligence unit to be specifically assigned to Air Force Special Operations Command. At the time, it was unique among Air Force intelligence squadrons in that it did not report to Air Force Intelligence, Surveillance and Reconnaissance Agency.

Growth in special operations missions and in reconnaissance operations in support of the global war on terrorism led to the unit becoming one of the fastest growing Air Force units. The unit expanded to include detachments at Fort Bragg, North Carolina and Cannon Air Force Base, New Mexico. In addition, the unit is affiliated with the National Geospatial-Intelligence Agency in Washington, DC and St. Louis, Missouri.

With the growth in unmanned aerial vehicles and full-motion video capabilities, the 11th Special Operations Intelligence Squadron is responsible for more than half of all the full-motion video exploited by the U.S. military.

== Lineage ==
5th Photographic Technical Squadron

- Constituted as the 5th Photographic Technical Squadron on 9 October 1943

Activated on 20 October 1943
Inactivated on 29 April 1946

- Allotted to the reserve on 12 July 1948

Activated on 10 August 1948

- Inactivated on 27 June 1949

Consolidated with the 99th Reconnaissance Technical Squadron as the 11th Reconnaissance Technical Squadronon 16 October 1984

11th Special Operations Intelligence Squadron

- Constituted as the 99th Reconnaissance Technical Squadron on 1 January 1953 and activated

Inactivated on 15 April 1955
Consolidated with the 5th Photographic Technical Squadron as the 11th Reconnaissance Technical Squadron on 16 October 1984

- Redesignated 11 Intelligence Squadron on 26 July 2006

Activated on 1 August 2006
Redesignated 11th Special Operations Intelligence Squadron on 31 July 2016

=== Assignments ===
- 8th Photographic Group, 20 October 1943
- III Reconnaissance Command, 15 January 1944
- 91st Photographic Wing (later 91st Reconnaissance Wing, 91st Air Division), 15 April 1944 – 29 April 1946
- Fourth Air Force, 10 August 1948
- Continental Air Command, 1 December 1948 – 27 June 1949
- 99th Strategic Reconnaissance Wing, 1 January 1953 – 15 Apr 1955
- Air Forces Special Operations Forces, 1 August 2006
- Twenty-Third Air Force (Air Forces Special Operations Forces), 1 January 2008
- 27th Special Operations Group, 31 July 2012
- 1st Special Operations Group, 16 April 2013 – present

=== Stations ===
- Will Rogers Field, Oklahoma, 20 October 1943
- Camp Stoneman, California, 24 February–12 March 1944
- Nadzab Airfield Complex, New Guinea, April 1944
- Leyte, Philippines, 8 November 1944
- Toguchi, Okinawa, 6 July 1945
- Tachikawa Airfield, Japan, 23 October 1945
- Luzon, (Note: Probably Fort William McKinley.) Philippines, December 1945 – 29 Apr 1946
- Long Beach Airport, California, 10 August 1948 – 27 June 1949
- Fairchild Air Force Base, Washington, 1 January 1953 – 15 April 1955
- Hurlburt Field, Florida, 1 August 2006 – present

== Campaigns ==
- Operation Iraqi Freedom
- Operation Enduring Freedom - Afghanistan
- Operation Enduring Freedom - Philippines
- Operation Enduring Freedom - Horn of Africa
- Operation Enduring Freedom - Trans-Sahara
- Operation Unified Response
