= Twenty-Third Air Force =

Twenty-Third Air Force (Air Forces Special Operations Forces)
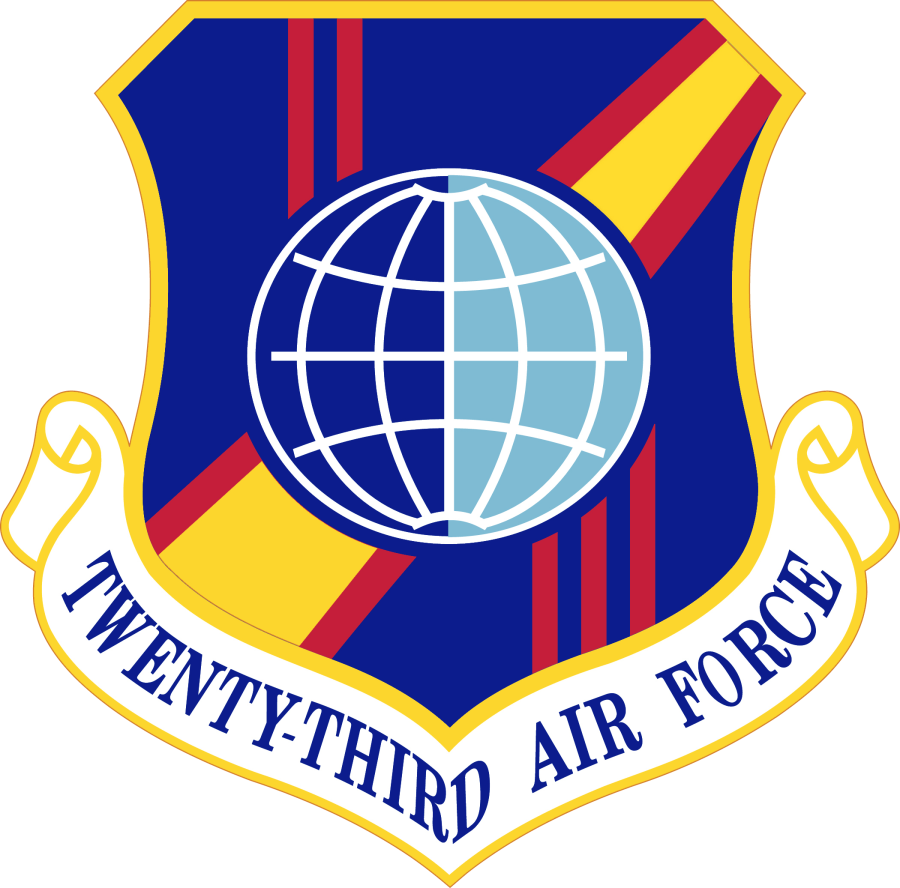
- Shield of the Twenty-Third Air Force (Note: Approved 27 December 2007)
- Active: 1 January 2008 – 4 April 2013 (5 years, 3 months)
- Country: United States
- Branch: United States Air Force
- Type: Numbered Air Force
- Role: Special Operations
- Part of: Air Force Special Operations Command; U.S. Special Operations Command

The Twenty-Third Air Force (Air Forces Special Operations Forces) was a Numbered Air Force that was assigned to Air Force Special Operations Command. It was stationed at Hurlburt Field, Florida and was active from 1 January 2008 until 4 April 2013. It served as the operational headquarters for Air Force special operations forces assigned to joint and combined commands. Starting in 2012, it transferred operational control of some of its units to other headquarters; its remaining functions were assumed by the Air Force Special Operations Command Air Operations Center when it was inactivated the following year.

== History ==
On 1 January 2008, Twenty-Third Air Force was established at Hurlburt Field as Air Force Special Operations Command's only Numbered Air Force with responsibility for Air Force Special Operations Forces. It was established as the headquarters to execute Air Force Special Operations Command missions supporting United States Special Operations Command.

The mission of Twenty-Third Air Force was to provide special operations forces to deployed air commanders. Its mission was to monitor and control global special operations activity to senior leaders; providing trained special operations command and control, intelligence, and weather support elements to theater special operations commanders and executing command and control for air, space and cyberspace operations supporting United States Special Operations Command.

Its 623rd Air and Space Operations Center included personnel and equipment to form joint special operations air components, responsible for planning and executing joint special operations air activities. and integrating special operations with conventional air operations. The 23rd Weather Squadron provided global weather coverage for Joint, Army, and Air Force special operations missions. The 11th Intelligence Squadron created intelligence products tailored for special operations missions. Finally, the 18th Flight Test Squadron evaluated aircraft, equipment, and tactics to assess their mission capability.

Upon its inactivation its mission was transferred to its subordinate 623rd Air Operations Center, which was reassigned to Air Force Special Operations Command and renamed the Air Force Special Operations Command Operations Center.

== Lineage ==
- Established as Twenty-Third Air Force (Air Force Special Operations Forces) on 30 November 2007

Activated on 1 January 2008
Inactivated on 4 April 2013

=== Assignments ===
- Air Force Special Operations Command, 1 January 2008 – 4 April 2013

=== Components ===
- 623rd Air and Space Operations Center (later 623rd Air Operations Center), 1 January 2008 – 4 April 2013
- 23rd Weather Squadron, 1 January 2008 – 28 March 2013 (attached to 1st Special Operations Group after 31 July 2012)
- 11th Intelligence Squadron, 1 January 2008 – 31 July 2012
- 18th Flight Test Squadron, 1 January 2008 – 12 February 2013

=== Stations ===
- Hurlburt Field, Florida, 1 January 2008 – 4 April 2013

== List of commanders ==
No.	Commander		Term		
No.	Portrait	Name	Took office	Left office	Term length
1	Michael W. Callan	Brigadier General; Michael W. Callan	1 January 2008	14 July 2008	195 days
2	Thomas J. Trask	Brigadier General; Thomas J. Trask	14 July 2008	7 January 2009	177 days
3	Richard S. Haddad	Brigadier General; Richard S. Haddad	7 January 2009	3 April 2009	86 days
4	Marshall B. Webb	Brigadier General; Marshall B. Webb	3 April 2009	June 2010	c. 1 year, 73 days
5	George F. Williams	Brigadier General; George F. Williams	April 2010	August 2010	c. 122 days
?	Timothy J. Leahy	Brigadier General; Timothy J. Leahy	August 2012	4 April 2013	c. 232 days
