= Loping Airfield =

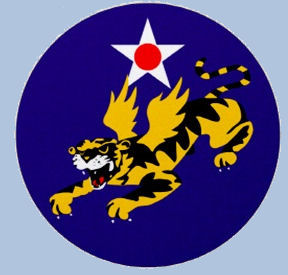
Loping Airfield
- Part of Fourteenth Air Force
- Yunnan Province, China

Site information
- Type: Military airfield
- Controlled by: United States Army Air Forces

Location
- Coordinates: 24°50′48″N 104°18′34″E

Site history
- Battles/wars: China Defensive Campaign 1942-1945

Loping Airfield is a former World War II United States Army Air Forces airfield in the People’s Republic of China, located approximately 3 miles south of the community of Luoping in Luoping County (Yunnan Province).

== History ==
The airfield was a primary transport base on the Chinese side of "the Hump" air supply route over the Himalayan Mountains, which was used by Air Transport Command for the transhipment of supplies from airfields in the Assam Valley of India. In 1945, Fourteenth Air Force also used the airfield as a transport base, primarily moving Chinese troops and their equipment from the base to other locations in China. The Americans used the base until the end of December 1945, when they closed their facilities at the station.

The runway is not now used for fixed wing aircraft. A resort facility has been developed at the south end of the runway for housing visitors and providing them helicopter service to view canola crops when they are in blossom.
