= Shimotsu =

Dissolved municipality in Wakayama prefecture, Japan

Shimotsu (下津町, Shimotsu-chō) was a town located in Kaisō District, Wakayama Prefecture, Japan.

As of 2003, the town had an estimated population of 14,481 and a density of 363.57 persons per km^{2}. The total area was 39.83 km^{2}.

On April 1, 2005, Shimotsu was merged into the expanded city of Kainan.
