= 524th Special Operations Squadron =

524th Special Operations Squadron

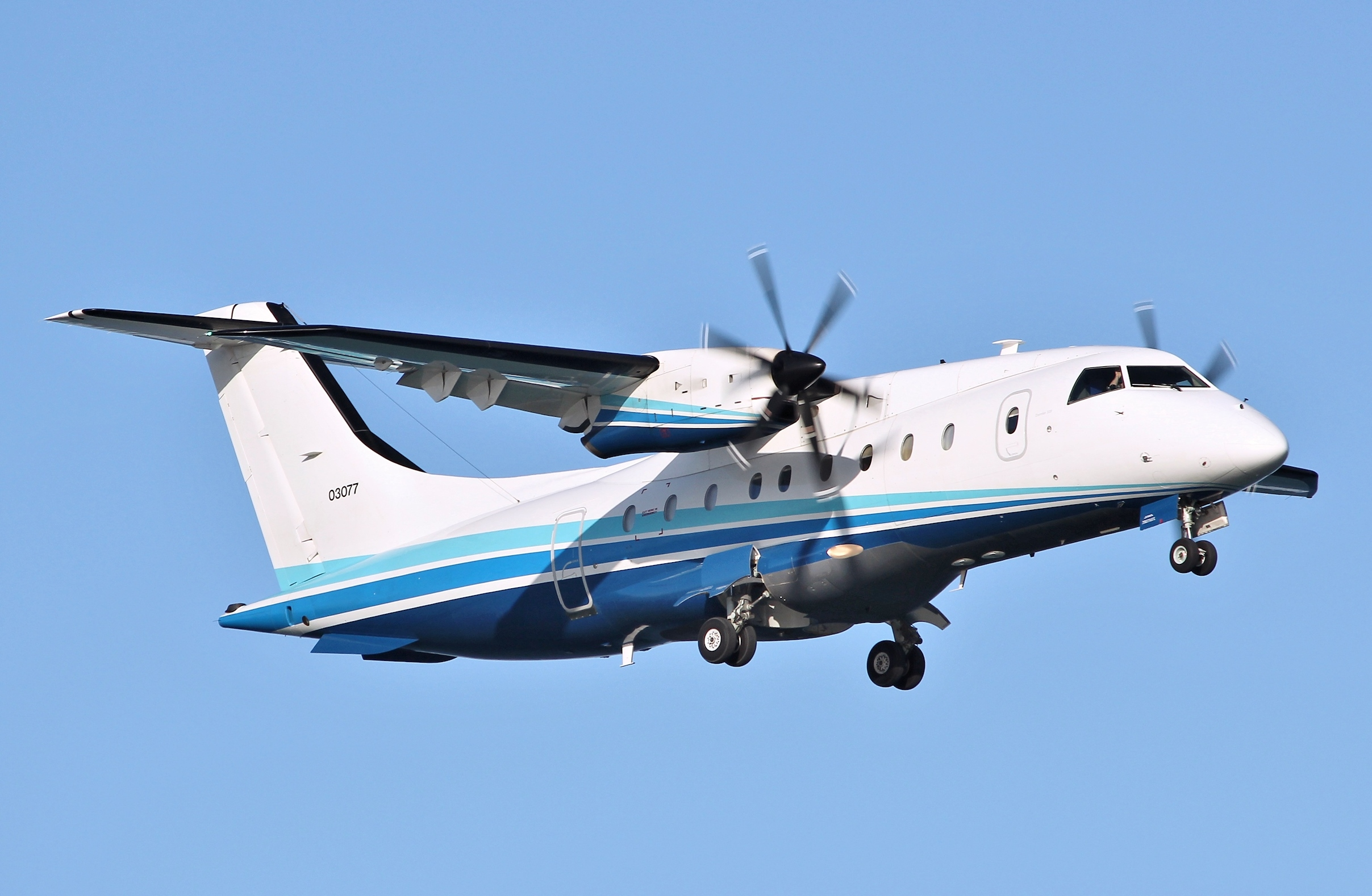
- A C-146A Wolfhound operated by the 524th
- Active: 1941–1945; 1946–2007; 2009–present
- Country: United States
- Branch: United States Air Force
- Role: Special Operations
- Part of: Air Force Special Operations Command
- Garrison/HQ: Cannon AFB
- Nickname: Hounds of Heaven
- Engagements: Southwest Pacific Theater; Mediterranean Theater of Operations; European Theater of Operations; Korean War; Operation Iraqi Freedom
- Decorations: Distinguished Unit Citation; Air Force Meritorious Unit Award; Air Force Outstanding Unit Award; Philippine Republic Presidential Unit Citation; Korean Presidential Unit Citation

Insignia
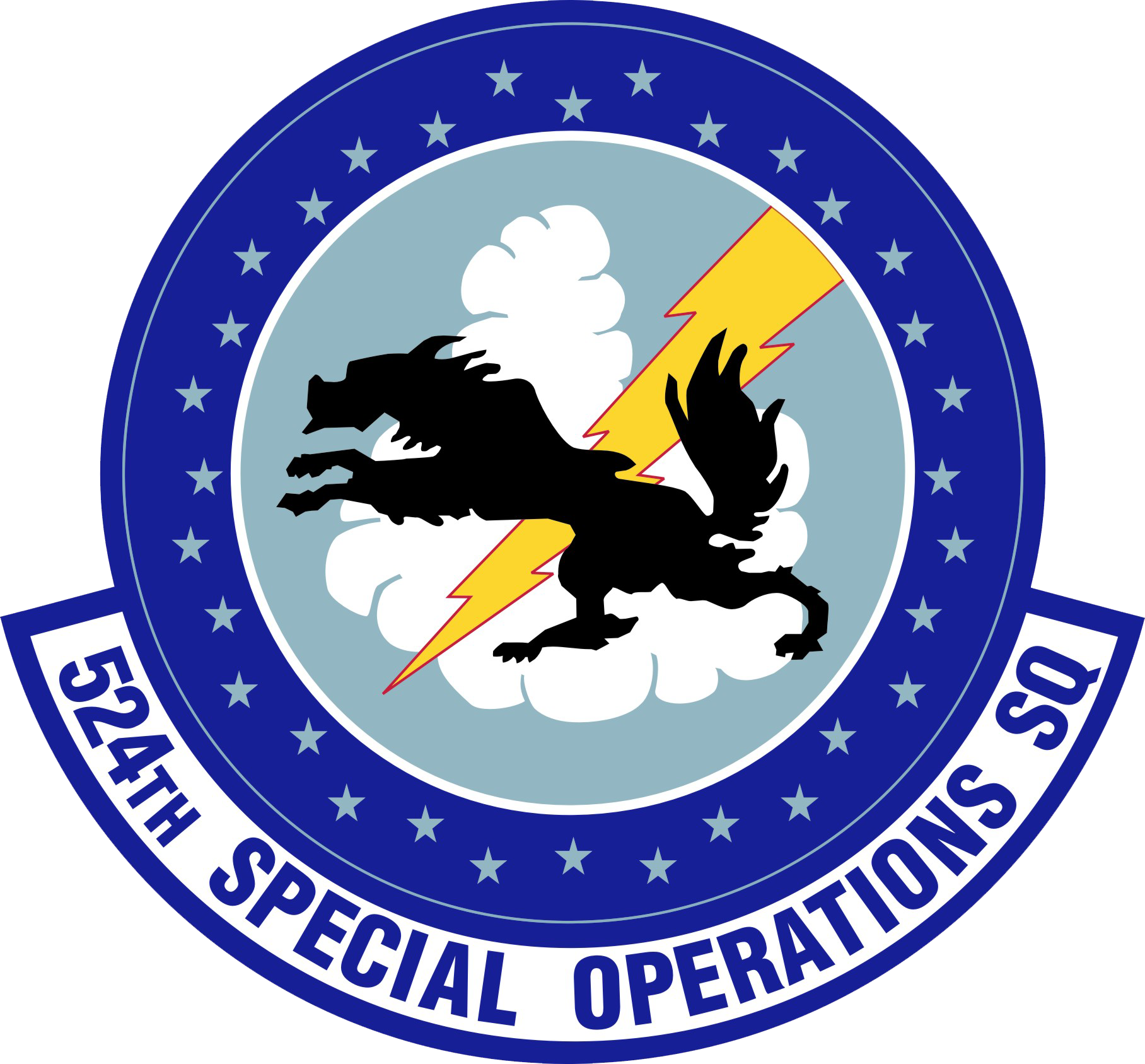
- 524th Special Operations Squadron emblem (Note: Approved 21 January 1955, newest rendition approved on 19 July 2010.)

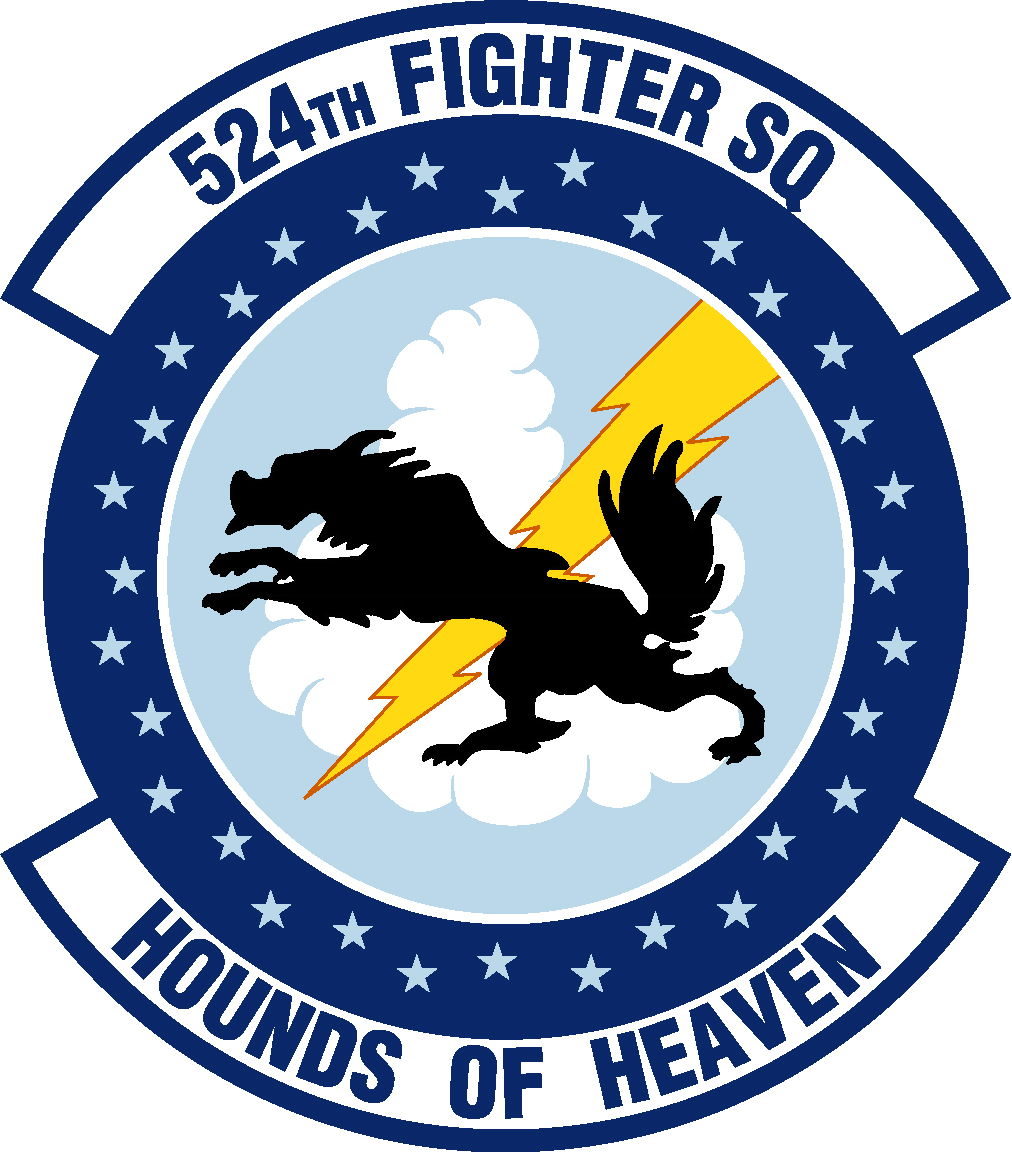
- 524th Fighter Squadron emblem (Note: Approved 21 January 1955.)

The 524th Special Operations Squadron is an active squadron of the United States Air Force, based at Duke Field, Florida, with the 492d Special Operations Wing.

== History ==
=== World War II ===
==== Southwest Pacific ====
The squadron was first activated by General Headquarters Air Force in early 1941 as the 11th Reconnaissance Squadron, attached to the 27th Bombardment Group at Hunter Field, Georgia and equipped with Douglas B-18 Bolo medium bombers. In August the squadron was redesignated the 91st Bombardment Squadron and was assigned directly to the 27th Group. On 21 October the squadron was ordered to the Philippines in response to the growing crisis in the Pacific and it sailed on 1 November.

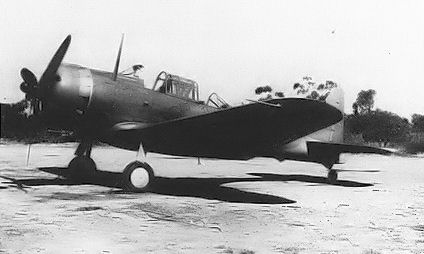
Douglas A-24 Banshee Dive Bomber formerly with the 27th Bombardment Group at Charters Towers Airfield, Australia

The squadron arrived at Fort William McKinley in the Philippines and prepared for delivery of its A-24 Banshee dive bombers. However, when the Imperial Japanese Army attacked the Philippines in December the situation had not changed. Unknown to the men of the squadron, to avoid capture or destruction of their aircraft, the ship carrying the planes was diverted to Australia. Members of the squadron flew to Australia to pick up their A-24s from the USAT Meigs. However, because swift Japanese advance prevented the airmen in Australia from returning to the Philippines, these members of the air echelon of the 27th group were ordered to operate from Brisbane.

The ground echelon of the 27th was evacuated south from Luzon on 25 December to the Bataan Peninsula, arriving to form the 2nd Battalion (27th Bombardment Group), Provisional Infantry Regiment (Air Corps). For the 99 days following the attack on Pearl Harbor until their surrender to the Japanese after the Battle of Bataan, the men of the squadron and other ground elements of the 27th Bombardment Group and other Air Corps units in the Philippines became the only Air Force units in history to fight as an infantry regiment and to be captured as a unit. After surrendering, they were forced to endure the infamous Bataan Death March. Of the 880 or so Airmen who were taken prisoner, fewer than half survived captivity. However, a number of officers and enlisted men of the 27th Bomb Group were evacuated out of the Philippines in five United States Navy submarines just before it was overrun by the Japanese during April. (Note: The submarines were: USS Seawolf (SS-197), USS Seadragon (SS-194), USS Sargo (SS-188), USS Swordfish (SS-193) and the USS Spearfish (SS-190).) On the night of 3 May 1942 these subs managed to sneak into Manila Bay and evacuate American personnel from Corregidor to Java and Fremantle, Western Australia. The squadron continued to participate in combat in the Southwest Pacific 4 May 1942.

On 12 February pilots of the 91st flew their A-24s to Malang Java in the Netherlands East Indies to defend the island. From 27 February through 1 March, three A-24s of the 91st participated in Battle of the Java Sea. For its efforts in the Philippines and the Southwest Pacific during late 1941 and early 1942, the squadron received three Distinguished Unit Citations (DUC).

On 25 March the surviving 27th Bombardment Group personnel were assigned to the 3rd Bombardment Group at Charters Towers Airfield in Queensland, Australia. The remaining A-24 aircraft were added to the 8th Bombardment Squadron. On 4 May the unmanned and unequipped 91st Bombardment Squadron was transferred back to the United States.

==== Mediterranean Theater ====
The squadron was re-manned and re-equipped at Hunter Field with the Douglas A-20 Havoc light bomber. After additional training in Mississippi and Louisiana, the group moved to Ste-Barbe-du-Tlelat Airfield, Algeria, arriving on 26 December to enter combat in North Africa with Twelfth Air Force.

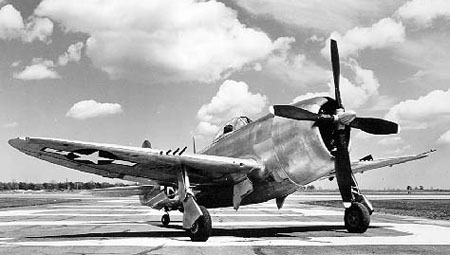
Republic P-47 Thunderbolt

Maintenance and support personnel went by sea to North Africa while aircrews and the A-20s flew to South America then across to North Africa, In North Africa, the A-20s were sent to other groups and the 91st was redesignated as the 524th Fighter-Bomber Squadron and equipped with the North American A-36 Apache dive bomber. The squadron flew its first combat missions of the war from Korba Airfield, Tunisia on 6 June 1943. The 524th was redesignated the 524th Fighter Squadron in May 1944 and converted first to the Curtiss P-40 Warhawk, then to the Republic P-47 Thunderbolt aircraft.

During Operation Husky, the Allied invasion of Sicily, operations included participation in the reduction of Pantelleria and Lampedusa Islands and supporting ground forces. In the Italian Campaign the squadron covered the landings at Salerno and received a DUC for preventing three German armored divisions from reaching the Salerno beachhead on 10 September 1943. In addition, the group supported the Fifth Army during the Allied drive toward Rome.

The squadron took part in Operation Dragoon, the invasion of southern France, and assisted Seventh Army's advance up the Rhone Valley, receiving a fifth DUC for helping to disrupt the German retreat on 4 September 1944. The 524th took part in the air interdiction of the enemy's communications in northern Italy, and assisted in the Allied drive from France into Germany during the last months of the war. The unit was at Biblis, Germany on V-E Day. The squadron remained in Germany with the Army of Occupation until October 1945 before returning to the US, where it was inactivated upon arriving at the port of embarkation in November.

=== Army of Occupation Duty ===
Within a year, the 524th was again activated under the United States Air Forces Europe as part of the occupation forces in Germany at Fritzlar Air Base when the 27th Fighter Group took over the mission, personnel, and P-47 Thunderbolts of the inactivating 366th Fighter Group. Less than a year later, in June 1947, the squadron was transferred without personnel or equipment to Bad Kissingen Airfield, then to Andrews Field, Maryland where it was assigned to Strategic Air Command (SAC).

=== Strategic Air Command ===
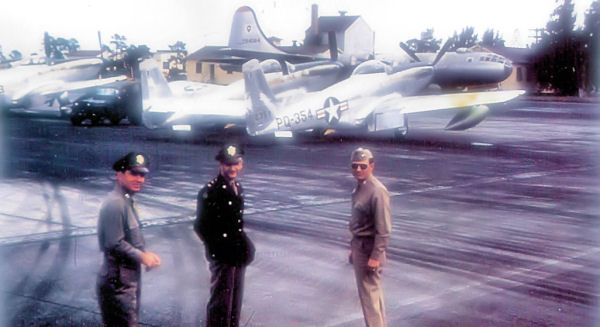
27th Fighter Wing North American F-82E Twin Mustangs and a Boeing B-29 Superfortress at Kearney AFB.

SAC moved the squadron to Kearney Army Air Field Nebraska the following month as Kearney was taken out of caretaker status. At Kearney the 524th was initially equipped with the North American P-51D Mustang. The mission of the squadron was to fly long-range escort missions for SAC Boeing B-29 Superfortress bombers. In 1948 the 524th upgraded to North American F-82 Twin Mustangs. With the arrival of the F-82s, the older F-51s were sent to Air National Guard units. The first production F-82Es reached the 27th in early 1948, and almost immediately the unit deployed to McChord AFB, Washington in June where its squadrons stood on alert on a secondary air defense mission due to heightened tensions resulting from the Berlin Airlift. The 27th could launch an escort mission if conflict broke out in Europe. From McChord, the group flew its Twin Mustangs on weather reconnaissance missions over the northwest Pacific, but problems were encountered with their fuel tanks. Unused Northrop F-61 Black Widow external tanks were found at Hamilton AFB, California that could be modified for the F-82 which were fitted on the pylons of the Twin Mustang that solved the problem. With a reduction in tension, the unit returned to its home base in Nebraska during September.

In January 1949, Eighth Air Force planned a large airshow at Carswell Air Force Base, Texas. All of its assigned units were to participate in a coordinated flyover. Kearney AFB was socked-in with a blizzard on the day of the show. Nevertheless, paths were cut through the snow for the aircraft to taxi and somehow the F-82s got airborne, joining up with SAC bombers over Oklahoma on schedule. The flyover by the Twin Mustangs was a tremendous success, with SAC leadership being amazed that the F-82 was truly an all-weather aircraft and the unit able to carry out their mission despite the weather.

In early 1949, the squadron began carrying out long-range escort profile missions. Flights to Puerto Rico, Mexico, the Bahamas, and Washington DC were carried out. For President Truman's 1949 inauguration, the squadron's parent 27th Fighter Wing launched 48 aircraft to fly in the review in formation down Pennsylvania Avenue. Another flyover over the newly dedicated Idlewild Airport in New York City soon followed, with the aircraft flying non-stop from Kearney AFB. Two months later SAC decided to close Kearney AFB and the 524th transferred to Bergstrom Air Force Base, Texas on 16 March.

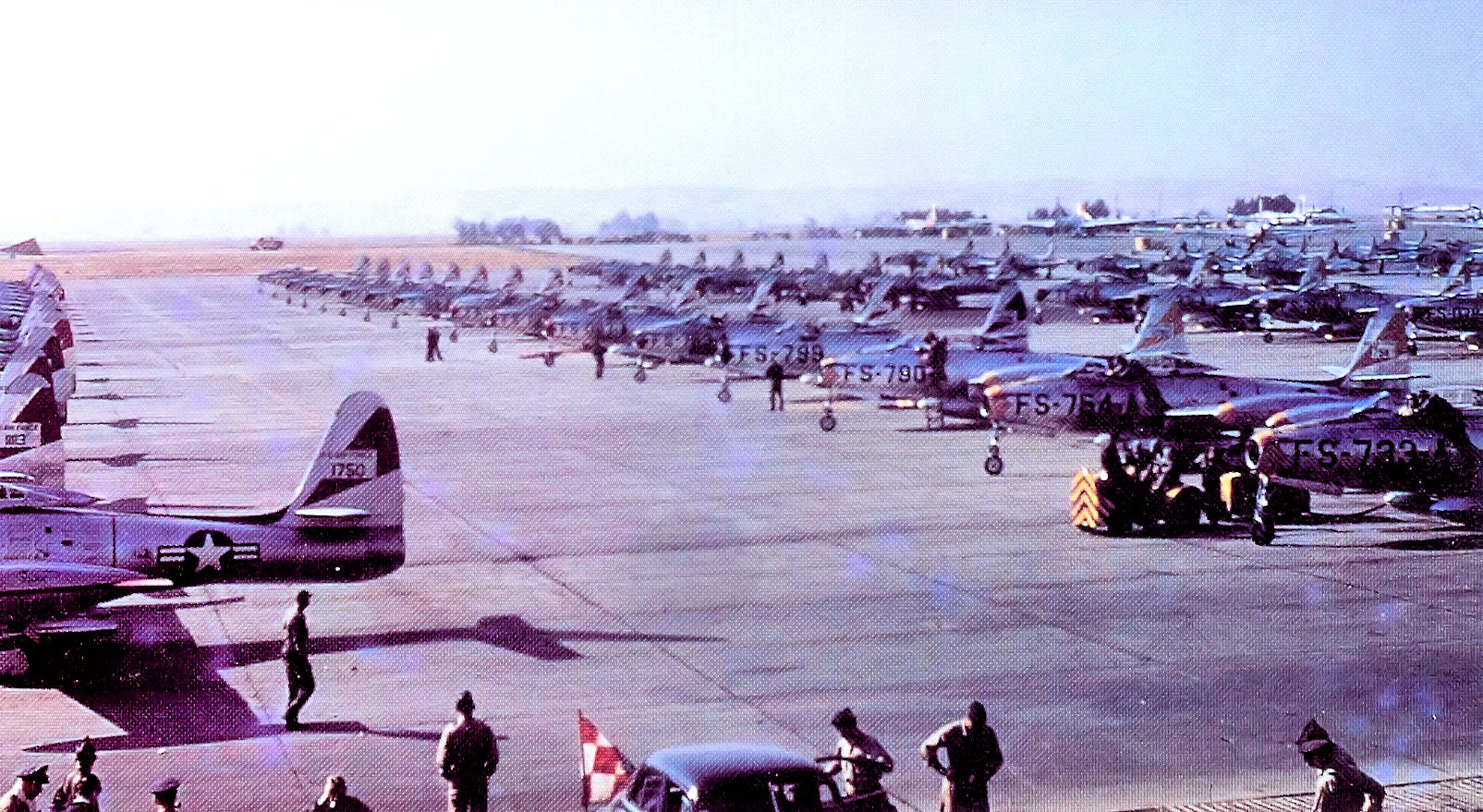
27th Fighter-Escort Group F-84Gs at Bergstrom AFB in 1952

At Bergstrom, the 524th transitioned to jet aircraft with Republic F-84E Thunderjet in 1950. It was redesignated the 524th Fighter-Escort Squadron on 1 February, to reflect the squadron mission. By the end of summer, the transition to the Thunderjets was complete and the Twin Mustangs were mostly sent to reclamation, with a few being sent to Far East Air Forces (FEAF) or Alaska as replacement aircraft or for air defense duties.

The squadron participated in the deployment of 180 F-84s from Bergstrom AFB to Fürstenfeldbruck Air Base Germany in September 1950, via Labrador, Greenland, Iceland, and England, delivering the Thunderjets to the 36th Fighter-Bomber Group. This operation won the unit's parent 27th Fighter-Escort Wing the Mackay Trophy for 1950. This was the second long-range mass flight of jet fighter aircraft in aviation history. This feat was repeated in October when aircraft were ferried to Neubiberg Air Base, Germany.

==== Korean War ====
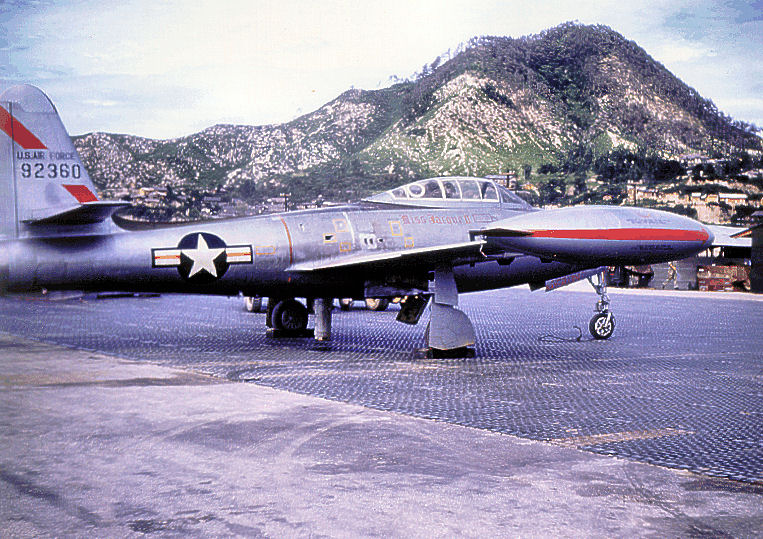
Republic F-84E Thunderjet at Taegu AB (K-2), South Korea, 1951

In November 1950, the 524th received orders to deploy to Japan to support FEAF in the Korean War. The squadron departed Bergstrom on 11 November refueling at Williams AFB, Arizona en route to San Diego, California. The squadron sailed on three aircraft carriers. (Note: The carriers were: USS Bairoko (CVE-115), USS Bataan (CVL-29) and USS Cape Esperance (CVE-88).) By 30 November the ground echelon arrived at Kimpo Air Base (K-14), South Korea, preparing for the arrival of the air echelon which unloaded in Japan. Once unloaded from the transport carriers, the aircraft were barged to Kisarazu Air Base where they were preflighted for a short flight to Yokota Air Base. However, due to the open air deck shipment the aircraft had salt air induced corrosion, landing gear damage and some aircraft also had flat tires.

On 1 December FEAF split the 27th Fighter-Escort Wing into forward and rear echelons. Advanced headquarters and operational squadrons were at Taegu Air Base (K-2), South Korea; while support units and the rear echelon were located at Itazuke Air Base, Japan. The advanced echelon would rely on the 49th Fighter-Bomber Wing for logistical support, while the rear echelon would rely on the 6160th Air Base Wing.

For the next six months, the unit flew missions in support of ground forces, earning another DUC for missions between 26 January and 21 April 1951. These missions included close support of the largest paratroop landing in the Korean War and escort for B-29 Superfortress bombers on raids over North Korea, including air-to-air combat with enemy MiG-15 fighters.

In June the unit began to give combat orientation to their replacements, the newly arrived 136th Fighter-Bomber Wing. They also assisted the 49th Fighter-Bomber Wing to transition from Lockheed F-80 Shooting Stars to F-84Es. The 524th was relieved from attachment to FEAF and returned to Bergstrom in August. Once at Bergstrom, the squadron's parent 27th Fighter-Escort Group became non-operational and the squadron was attached directly to the 27th Fighter-Escort Wing as SAC implemented the Dual Deputate organization. (Note: Under this plan flying squadrons reported to the wing Deputy Commander for Operations and maintenance squadrons reported to the wing Deputy Commander for Maintenance)

=== Cold War ===
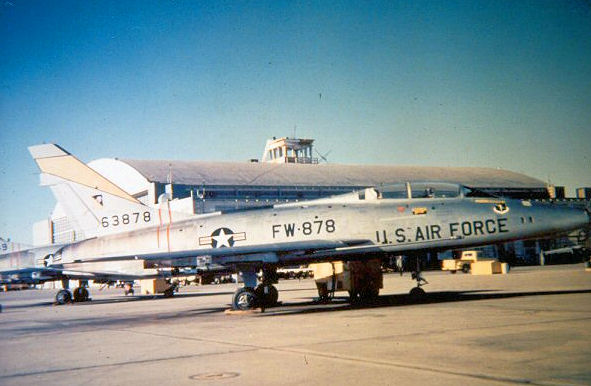
524th TFS F-100F Super Sabre 56-3878 fighter trainer in natural metal finish

On 20 January 1953 the squadron was redesignated as the 524th Strategic Fighter Squadron to reflect the changed emphasis on strike missions and the decreasing need for escort missions. With the arrival of the Boeing B-47 Stratojet and Boeing B-52 Stratofortress into the SAC inventory, the fighter escorts were no longer necessary for the new fast jet bombers, which flew missions individually, not in large formations. On 1 July 1957, the 27th wing was transferred to Tactical Air Command (TAC) and the squadron became 524th Fighter-Bomber Squadron.

TAC assigned the squadron to Twelfth Air Force and the unit re-equipped with the new McDonnell F-101A Voodoo, which had been planned under SAC. Its mission was to deliver a centerline nuclear bomb to a target. The F-101A was capable of little else and although designated as a fighter aircraft, it had poor aerial combat capabilities and would not have fared well in any air-to-air combat against enemy aircraft although its speed was demonstrated when it broke the world speed record on 12 December 1957.

The squadron became the 524th Tactical Fighter Squadron in 1958 when USAF ended the distinction between "Fighter-Bomber" and "Fighter-Day" units. In 1959 the Voodoo's days at Bergstrom ended after the installation returned to SAC to operate as a B-52 and KC-135 base. Rather than inactivate a unit with such a distinguished history, the 524th and other elements of the 27th Tactical Fighter Wing moved on paper to Cannon AFB, New Mexico, where they took over the mission, personnel and North American F-100 Super Sabres of the 312th Tactical Fighter Wing, which was inactivated.

As United States involvement in the Vietnam War expanded, the squadron deployed twice to Takhli RTAFB, Thailand in 1963 and 1964. However, by 1965 deployed squadrons in Southeast Asia were replaced by squadrons permanently stationed there and the squadron made its final Pacific deployment to Misawa AB, Japan in 1965. As USAF F-100 resources were transferred to these squadrons, the 524th's mission, like that of most TAC fighter units in the US, focused on combat crew training. The squadron conducted F-100 replacement training from 1 January 1966 to 6 March 1969.

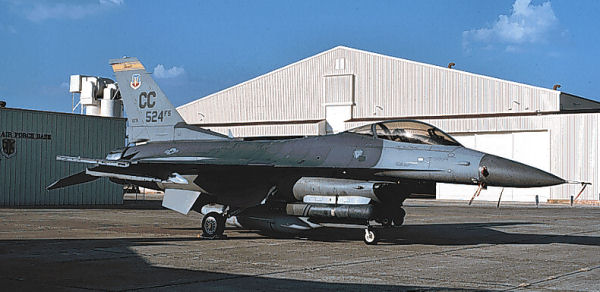
F-16 of the 524th Fighter Squadron

With the withdrawal of the F-100 from Vietnam in 1970, and the phaseout of the aircraft from the active Air Force inventory, the 27th TFW began conversion to the General Dynamics F-111. Loaned F-111As from Nellis AFB, Nevada facilitated training while the squadron waited for its own planes. By July 1972, the last operational active duty Air Force F-100s were transferred to the Air National Guard. Beginning in January 1980 the 524th served as the 27th wing's primary F-111 training squadron. The squadron conducted overseas deployments to maintain combat readiness of its personnel and aircraft from 1984 to 1989. From September 1992 to July 1993 squadron aircrews and support personnel rotated to Incirlik Air Base, Turkey, in support of Operation Provide Comfort.

=== F-16 Operations ===
In 1995 the squadron began to transition to the General Dynamics F-16 Fighting Falcon. With the arrival of the F-16s, the squadron's F-111s were sent to storage. The F-111 in various forms had been at Cannon AFB for 29 years.

On 15 January 1998, the 524th ventured to the Middle East for their first overseas deployment since transitioning to the F-16. The unit was the major force provider for the 524th Expeditionary Fighter Squadron at Prince Sultan Air Base, Saudi Arabia, where it was assigned to the 4404th Operations Group, Provisional. Later that year, it deployed to Hill AFB, Utah for Exercise Combat Hammer. During the exercise, they dropped inert GBU-24 Paveway III laser-guided bombs and fired live AGM-65 Maverick antitank missiles on Utah test range. The hit rate was one of the highest ever seen in the Air Force, showcasing the lethality of the Block 40 F-16.

During Operation Allied Force in 1999, the squadron was "on-call" duty to augment forces. The quick termination of hostilities precluded the unit from seeing action.

On 11 September 2001 when terrorists attacked the World Trade Center in New York City and The Pentagon in Washington, D.C., aircraft from the squadron went on air defense alert. In December 2002, the 524th deployed to Kuwait and participated in Operation Iraqi Freedom, dropping nearly a million pounds of precision guided munitions, more than any other F-16 Block 40 squadron in history.

=== Special Operations ===
On 1 April 2009, Air Force Special Operations Command prepared for the expansion of the 27th Special Operations Group by activating the 7524th Special Operations Squadron, Provisional at Cannon Air Force Base. As the squadron approached full strength, the 524th was activated again as the 524th Special Operations Squadron and assumed the provisional unit's mission, personnel, and equipment.

On 19 November 2009 a Bombardier Dash 8 crashed, destroying the aircraft and injuring all nine passengers and crew, three seriously. An investigation blamed the crash on crew error, citing the crew's failure to load an adequate amount of fuel on the aircraft for the flight and refusing to turn back or seek an alternate landing site as it became apparent that the aircraft did not have sufficient fuel to reach its destination. The Air Force declined to provide details as to whether the crew was punished for the crash. Around 31 May 2017, the 524th SOS was relocated to Duke Field to become part of the 492d Special Operations Wing, in order to better coordinate with its reserve Total Force partner unit, the 919th Special Operations Wing's 859th Special Operations Squadron.

== Lineage ==
- Constituted as the 11th Reconnaissance Squadron (Light) on 20 November 1940

Activated on 15 January 1941
Redesignated 91st Bombardment Squadron (Light) on 14 August 1941
Redesignated 524th Fighter-Bomber Squadron on 23 August 1943
Redesignated 524th Fighter Squadron, Single Engine on 30 May 1944
Inactivated on 7 November 1945

- Activated on 20 August 1946

Redesignated 524th Fighter Squadron, Two Engine on 22 July 1947
Redesignated 524th Fighter Squadron, Jet on 1 December 1949
Redesignated 524th Fighter-Escort Squadron on 1 February 1950
Redesignated 524th Strategic Fighter Squadron on 20 January 1953
Redesignated 524th Fighter-Bomber Squadron on 1 July 1957
Redesignated 524th Tactical Fighter Squadron on 1 July 1958
Redesignated 524th Tactical Fighter Training Squadron on 8 July 1980
Redesignated 524th Fighter Squadron on 1 November 1991.
Inactivated on 20 September 2007
Redesignated 524th Special Operations Squadron on 23 September 2009
Activated on 1 October 2009

=== Assignments ===
- 27th Bombardment (later, 27th Fighter-Bomber; 27th Fighter) Group

Attached on 15 January 1941
Assigned 14 August 1941 – 7 November 1945

- Ground echelon attached to: 5th Interceptor Command as infantry unit: 2 January – 9 April 1942
- 27th Fighter (later, 27th Fighter-Escort) Group, 20 August 1946 (attached to 136th Fighter-Bomber Wing, 30 June 1951 – 12 August 1951, 27th Fighter-Escort Wing, 25 August 1951 – 15 June 1952)
- 27th Fighter-Escort (later, 27th Strategic Fighter; 27th Fighter-Bomber; 27th Tactical Fighter; 27th Fighter) Wing, 16 June 1952 (attached to 50th Fighter-Bomber Wing, 17 June 1959 – 8 July 1959)
- Turkish United States Logistics Command, 10 February 1961 – 16 June 1961
- 4158th Strategic Wing, 30 October 1961 – 14 November 1961
- 2d Air Division, 9–c. 27 June 1963 and 21 January–19 March 1964
- 39th Air Division, 1 December 1964 – 28 March 1965
- 27th Operations Group, 1 November 1991 – 20 September 2007.
- 27th Special Operations Group, 1 October 2009
- 492d Special Operations Group, May 2017

=== Stations ===
- Hunter Field, Georgia, 15 January–19 October 1941
- Fort William McKinley, Luzon, Philippines, 20 November 1941
- San Marcelino, Luzon, Philippines, 22 December 1941

(Air echelon operated from Archerfield Airport, Brisbane, Australia, 24 December 1941 – 5 February 1942)

- Limay, Luzon, Philippines, 25 December 1941
- Bataan, Luzon, Philippines, 5 January 1942 (Air echelon operated from: Malang, Java, Netherlands East Indies, 18 February–c. 1 March 1942, Archerfield Airport 10–24 March 1942)
- Charters Towers Airport, Australia, Apr–4 May 1942;
- Hunter Field, Georgia, 4 May 1942
- Key Field, Mississippi, 15 July 1942
- Hattiesburg Army Airfield, Mississippi, 15 August 1942
- Harding Army Air Field, Louisiana, 26 October 1942 – 21 November 1942
- Ste-Barbe-du-Tlelat Airfield, Algeria, 26 December 1942
- Nouvion Airfield, Algeria, 7 January 1943
- Ras el Ma, French Morocco, 6 April 1943
- Korba Airfield, Tunisia, 4 June 1943
- Ponte Olivo Airfield, Sicily, 18 July 1943
- San Antonio, Sicily, 3 September 1943
- Rome Ciampino Airport, Italy, 18 September 1943
- Guado Airfield, Italy, 4 November 1943
- Pomigliano Airfield, Italy, 19 January 1944
- Castel Volturno, Italy, 10 April 1944
- Santa Maria Airfield, Italy, 8 May 1944
- Le Banca Airfield, Italy, 7 June 1944
- Ciampino Airfield, Italy, 11 June 1944
- Voltone Airfield, Italy, 4 July 1944
- Sarragia Airfield, Corsica, 13 July 1944
- Le Luc Airfield, France, 25 August 1944
- Salon de Provence Airfield (Y-16), France, 30 August 1944
- Loyettes Airfield (Y-25), France, 12 September 1944
- Tarquinia Airfield, Italy, 2 October 1944
- Pontedera Airfield, Italy, 1 December 1944
- Saint Dizier-Robinson Airfield (A-64), France, 21 February 1944
- Nancy-Ochey Airfield (A-96), France, 19 March 1945
- Fliegerhorst Biblis (Y-78), Germany, 5 April 1945
- Fliegerhorst Sandhofen (Y-79), Germany, 24 June 1945
- Fliegerhorst Echterdingen (R-50), Germany, 15 September–20 October 1945
- Camp Shanks, New York, 6–7 November 1945
- Fritzlar Air Base(Y-86), Germany, 20 August 1946
- Bad Kissingen Airfield (R-98), Germany, 25 June 1947
- Andrews Field, Maryland, 25 June 1947
- Kearney Army Air Field (later Kearney Air Force Base), Nebraska, 16 July 1947
- Bergstrom AFB, Texas, 16 March 1949 – 11 November 1950
- Taegu Air Base (K-2), South Korea, 5 December 1950
- Itazuke AB, Japan, 31 January 1951
- Bergstrom AFB, Texas, 12 August 1951 (deployed to Misawa AB, Japan, 13 October 1952 – c. 13 February 1953 and RAF Sturgate, England, 7 May 1955 – 19 August 1955)
- Cannon AFB, New Mexico, 18 February 1959 – 20 September 2007

Deployed at:

Hahn AB, West Germany, 17 June 1959 – 8 July 1959
Incirlik AB, Turkey, 10 February 1961 – 16 June 1961
Elmendorf AFB, Alaska, 30 October 1961 – 14 November 1961
MacDill AFB, Florida, 21 October 1962 – 1 December 1962
Dhahran Air Base, Saudi Arabia, 17 September – 20 November 1963
Takhli RTAFB, Thailand, 9–c. 27 June 1963 and 21 January 1964 – 19 March 1964
Misawa AB, Japan, with detachment at Kunsan AB, South Korea, 1 December 1964 – 28 March 1965
Holloman AFB, New Mexico, 13 April–12 May 1966

- Cannon AFB, New Mexico, 1 October 2009
- Duke Field, Florida, May 2017

=== Aircraft ===
- Douglas B-18 Bolo, 1941
- Douglas A-24 Banshee, 1941–1942
- Douglas A-20 Havoc, 1941, 1942–1943
- North American A-36 Apache, 1943–1944
- Curtiss P-40 Warhawk, 1944
- Republic P-47 Thunderbolt, 1944–1945: 1946–1947
- North American P-51 Mustang, 1947–1948
- North American F-82 Twin Mustang, 1948–1950
- Republic F-84 Thunderjet, 1950–1958
- McDonnell Douglas F-101 Voodoo, 1957–1958
- North American F-100 Super Sabre, 1959–1969, 1969–1972
- General Dynamics F-111 Aardvark, 1972–1995
- F-16, 1995–2007
- C-146A Wolfhound, 2009–present

=== Awards and campaigns ===
Award streamer	Award	Dates	Notes
	Distinguished Unit Citation	7 December 1941– ca. Apr 1942	Philippine Islands 91st Bombardment Squadron
	Distinguished Unit Citation	8 December 1941–22 December 1941	Philippine Islands 91st Bombardment Squadron
	Distinguished Unit Citation	6 January 1942–8 March 1942	Philippine Islands 91st Bombardment Squadron
	Distinguished Unit Citation	10 September 1943	Italy 524th Fighter-Bomber Squadron
	Distinguished Unit Citation	4 September 1944	France 524th Fighter Squadron
	Distinguished Unit Citation	26 January 1951–21 April 1951	Korea 524th Fighter-Escort Squadron
	Air Force Outstanding Unit Award	15 August 1968 – 15 August 1969	524th Tactical Fighter Squadron
	Air Force Outstanding Unit Award	1 January 1981 – 30 June 1982	524th Tactical Fighter Squadron
	Air Force Outstanding Unit Award	1 January 1988 – 31 December 1989	524th Tactical Fighter Squadron
	Air Force Outstanding Unit Award	1 April 1992–30 September 1992	524th Fighter Squadron
	Philippine Republic Presidential Unit Citation	7 December 1941 – ca. April 1942	91st Bombardment Squadron
	Korean Presidential Unit Citation	9 November 1950 – 31 May 1951	524th Fighter-Escort Squadron

Campaign Streamer	Campaign	Dates	Notes
	Philippine Islands		91st Bombardment Squadron
	East Indies		91st Bombardment Squadron
	Sicily		91st Bombardment Squadron (Note: Redesignated 524th Fighter-Bomber Squadron during campaign)
	Naples-Foggia		524th Fighter-Bomber Squadron
	Anzio		524th Fighter-Bomber Squadron (Note: Redesignated 524th Fighter Squadron during campaign)
	Rome-Arno		524th Fighter-Bomber Squadron
	Northern France		524th Fighter Squadron
	Southern France		524th Fighter Squadron
	North Apennines		524th Fighter Squadron
	Rhineland		524th Fighter Squadron
	Central Europe		524th Fighter Squadron
	Air Combat, EAME Theater		524th Fighter Squadron
	World War II Army of Occupation		524th Fighter Squadron
	Chinese Communist Forces Intervention		524th Fighter-Escort Squadron
	First United Nations Counteroffensive		524th Fighter-Escort Squadron
	Chinese Communist Forces Spring Offensive		524th Fighter-Escort Squadron
	United Nations Summer-Fall Offensive		524th Fighter-Escort Squadron
	Global War on Terror Expeditionary Medal		524th Fighter Squadron
	National Resolution	16 December 2005 – 9 January 2007	524th Fighter Squadron
	Iraqi Surge	10 January 2007 – 20 September 2007	524th Fighter Squadron
