= Duke Field =

Military airport in Florida, U.S.

- Eglin Air Force Auxiliary Field #3
- Part of Eglin Air Force Base
- Near Crestview, Florida in United States of America
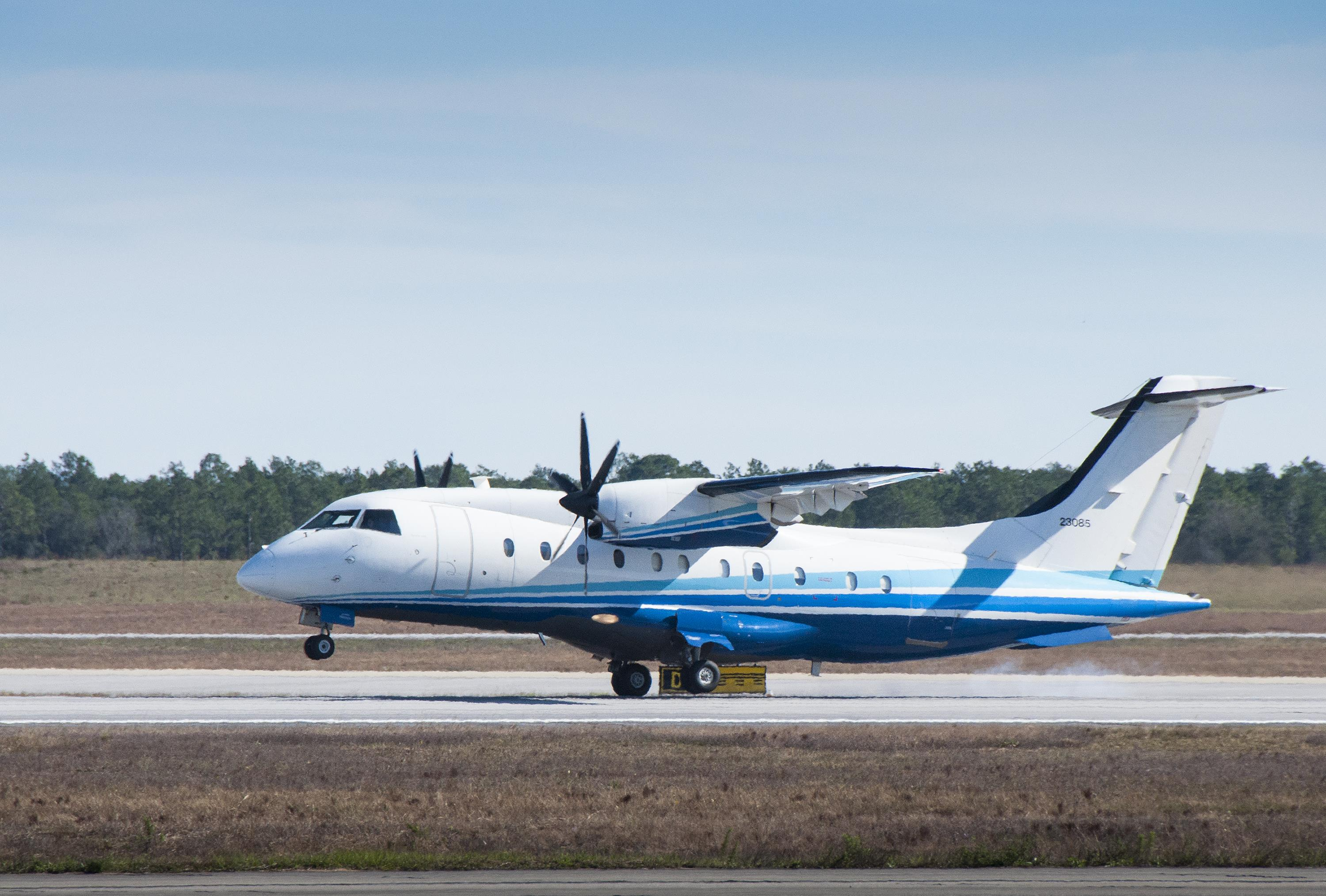
- A Dornier C-146A Wolfhound of the 919th Special Operations Wing based at Duke Field.

Site information
- Type: US Air Force base
- Owner: Department of Defense
- Operator: US Air Force
- Controlled by: Air Force Reserve Command (AFRC)
- Condition: Operational
- Website: 919sow.afrc.af.mil

Location
- Duke Field Duke Field (the United States) Duke Field (North America) Duke Field (Gulf of Mexico)
- Coordinates: 30°39′01″N 086°31′22″W

Site history
- Built: 1941 – 1942
- In use: 1942 – present

Garrison information
- Garrison: 919th Special Operations Wing

Airfield information
- Identifiers: IATA: EGI, ICAO: KEGI, FAA LID: EGI, WMO: 722246
- Elevation: 59.4 metres (195 ft) AMSL
Runways
Direction	Length and surface
18/36	2,446 metres (8,025 ft) Asphalt
180/360 (Assault strip)	1,066.8 metres (3,500 ft) Asphalt
- Other airfield facilities: 2x VTOL pads and 1x Landing Helicopter Deck

Duke Field (IATA: EGI, ICAO: KEGI, FAA LID: EGI), also known as Eglin AFB Auxiliary Field #3, is a military airport located three miles (5 km) south of the central business district of Crestview, in Okaloosa County, Florida, United States.

== History ==
Duke Field was one of the first auxiliary fields built on the Eglin Field / Eglin AFB complex. Clearing and grading began 23 January 1941, with the first building foundations laid on 15 February 1942. Field 3 was used as a training base by the Doolittle Raiders in 1942. Shortly after the end of World War II, the field was one of several sites used in the production of the 1949 feature film Twelve O'Clock High.

=== Cold War ===
In the 1950s, Duke Field became home to the 3205th Drone Group, which operated radio remote-controlled B-17s and F-80s that were used for gunnery and missile practice over the Gulf of Mexico. They were also used in the nuclear test program by flying the unmanned aircraft through atomic detonation clouds to gather fallout information.

A large hump-backed steel hangar, the "Butler Hangar", 160 feet (49 m) X 130 feet, transported from Trinidad (probably from the former Waller Air Force Base, closed 28 May 1949 due to budget cuts), was erected at Auxiliary Field 3 between 1 April and ~10 July 1950, by personnel of Company 'C', 806th Aviation Engineering Battalion, under Captain Samuel M. Cable, and the men of the 550th Guided Missiles Wing. Project Officer was Captain Clarence A. Ebbert of the Proving Ground Command Installations Division. An additional four feet of roof clearance was added to accommodate B-17s in the 21,000-square-foot (2,000 m^{2}) structure. Concrete block buildings, 160 feet (49 m) X 40 feet, were erected on the flanks of the hangar. Concurrently, the 8,000-foot (2,400 m) runway was widened to 100 feet (30 m) and additional parking ramps were constructed, with 117,327 cubic yards of dirt excavated. The new ramps and runway expansion consisted of asphalt over a crushed shell base.

In 1960 and 1961, in preparation for the Bay of Pigs Invasion, Duke Field was host to 'sanitized' Douglas C-54s and Curtiss C-46s used for transporting personnel, armaments and supplies between US bases such as Homestead AFB and Opa-locka Airport and CIA-run bases in Guatemala and latterly Nicaragua. A unit at the field was responsible for 'sanitizing' and adapting about 20 Douglas B-26 Invaders for use by Cuban exile aircrews during the invasion. A few T-33s and C-130s were also prepared for use in the conflict, but not used.

The Development Projects Division (DPD), the Central Intelligence Agency's air arm, operated as the 1045th Operational Evaluation and Training Group, Headquarters Command, Eglin AFB, as the Air Force designated it, but which was a DPD operation out of Duke Field from late 1960 to June/July 1961. "There was a total of about 20 Polish airmen at Eglin at the time, all of them 'employed' by Lockheed, so there should be enough of them to form at least two crews." The DPD operated independently of "the organizational structure of the project, in which it had a vital, central role, including air drops to the underground, training Cuban pilots, operation of air bases, the immense logistical problems of transporting the Cuban volunteers from Florida to Guatemala, and the procuring and servicing of the military planes."

=== Special Operations use ===
Between August and October 1970, during the Vietnam War, the Joint Contingency Task Group used AFROTC facilities at Duke Field to house US Army Special Forces troops involved in Operation Ivory Coast, a mission to rescue prisoners of war at Sơn Tây, North Vietnam. Aircraft based at Eglin AFB and Hurlburt Field involved in the training also used Duke Field daily as an operational airstrip to maintain a low profile.

On 30 July 1971, the 919th Tactical Airlift Group (919 TAG) was activated in the Air Force Reserve (AFRES) and established at Duke Field with C-130A Hercules aircraft, with the unit operationally gained by the Tactical Air Command (TAC). With this action, the 919 TAG effectively became the "host group" organization (similar to "host wing" at larger USAF installations) for Duke Field.

On 1 July 1975 the 919 TAG converted to a special operations mission and became the 919th Special Operations Group (919 SOG), the only Air Force Reserve AC-130 Spectre gunship unit. AC-130A were transferred from the Regular Air Force as the Regular Air Force transitioned to the AC-130H and nearly $6.7 million in new construction was programmed at Duke Field through Fiscal Year 1976. Although USAF C-130 airlift units were transferred to the Military Airlift Command (MAC) in 1975, AC-130 units remained under TAC.

In 1980, Duke Field was also one of the fields used in training for Operation Credible Sport, an initiative to prepare for a second rescue attempt of American hostages held in Iran using C-130 aircraft modified with multiple rocket engines for extremely short landings and takeoffs. Most of the testing for this was done at Wagner Field (Eglin AFB Auxiliary Field #1) and it was there during a 29 October 1980 demonstration of one of the highly modified YMC-130H Credible Sport aircraft that a malfunction and hard landing resulted in the destruction of this particular aircraft. All crew aboard the aircraft survived.

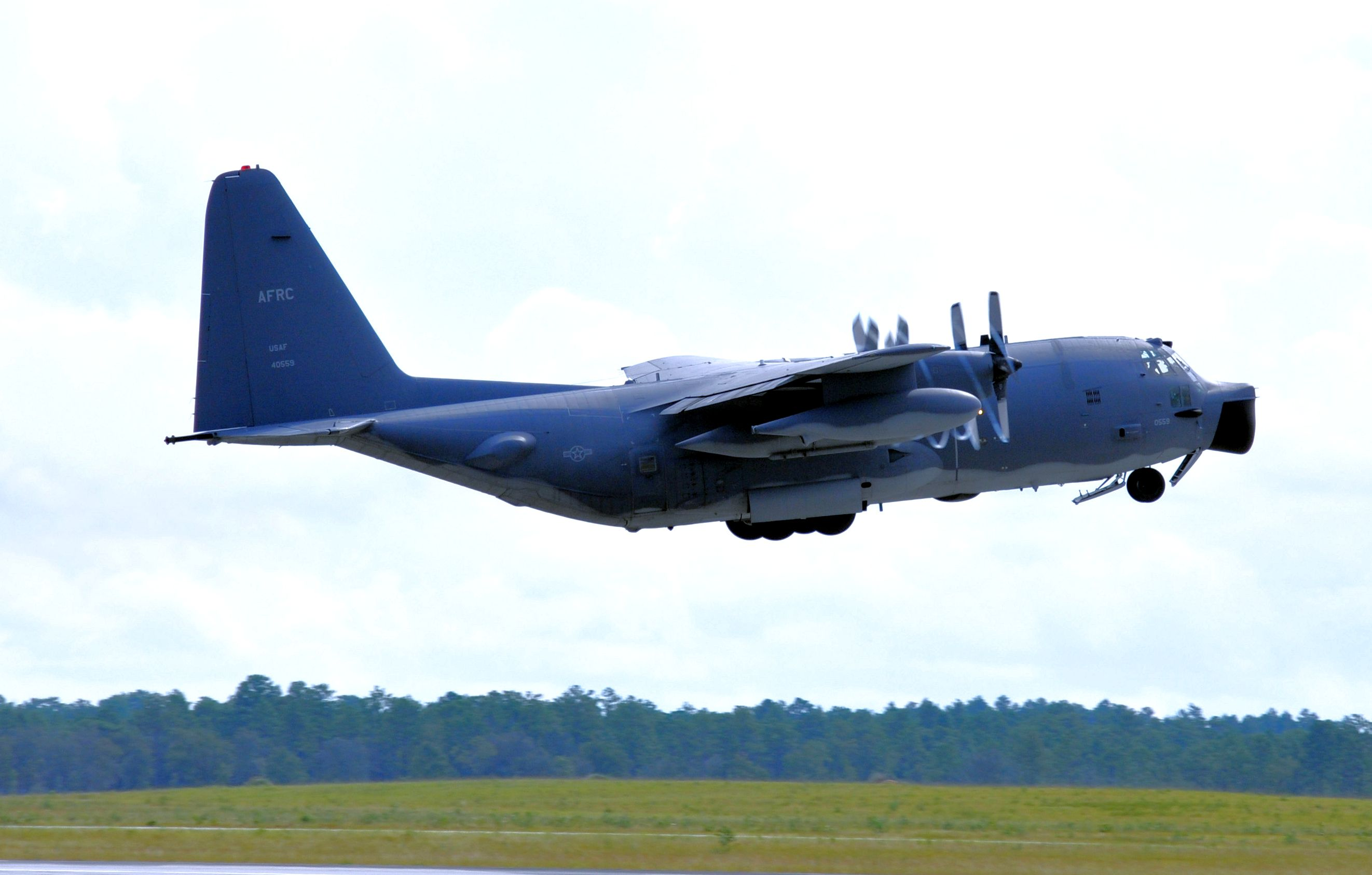
A MC-130E Combat Talon I, takes off for the final time from Duke Field, moments after it was officially retired from the 919th Special Operations Wing on 18 September 2012.

In 1983, operational claimancy for the 919 SOG shifted from TAC to MAC and the latter's newly established 23d Air Force (23 AF), said action paralleling the transfer of all Regular Air Force AC-130 and MC-130 units and assets from TAC to MAC. In 1990, 23 AF was re-designated as Air Force Special Operations Command (AFSOC), a separate Air Force major command (MAJCOM), and operational claimancy for the 919 SOG shifted to AFSOC.

In 1992, the 919 SOG was re-designated as the 919th Special Operations Wing (919 SOW), the designation it currently retains today. In 1995, the 919 SOW's AC-130A aircraft were retired and the 919 SOW converted to the MC-130E Combat Talon I and MC-130P Combat Shadow aircraft and made available for worldwide deployment. Also in 1995, while the wing's 711th Special Operations Squadron (711 SOS) transitioned to the MC-130E, the 5th Special Operations Squadron (5 SOS) was activated within the 919 SOW at Duke Field to fly the MC-130N/P, Combat Shadow special operations aerial refueling aircraft.

On 17 February 1997, the Air Force Reserve (AFRES) ceased to be a Field Operating Agency of the Air Force and became an Air Force MAJCOM as the Air Force Reserve Command (AFRC), making the 919 SOW a subordinate command of AFRC. However, the 919 SOW's operational relationship with AFSOC would remain unchanged.

In 2000, about 170 active duty USAF aircraft maintenance personnel from the 716th Maintenance Squadron (716 MXS) took up residence at Duke Field as an Active Associate unit to the 919 SOW. At the time, this symbiotic relationship was unique because it was the only active associate maintenance squadron in the Air Force. The 716 MXS worked in tandem with Air Force Reserve members to provide maintenance support to MC-130E aircraft. The 716 MXS maintainers were under the mission control of the 919th Maintenance Group (919 MXG) infrastructure and 919 MXG work center supervisors scheduled the maintainers, prioritized the work, furnished tools and special equipment, and provided first line supervision. However, the 716 MXS maintainers remained under the administrative control of the active duty 16th Maintenance Group (16 MXG) at Hurlburt Field through the 716 MXS commander. The commander was responsible for military discipline matters, administrative reports (including performance reports), personnel accountability, manpower, training, individual equipment and temporary duty/travel funding.

=== 2008 Doolittle reunion ===
Six original Raiders were present at Duke Field, on Saturday 31 May 2008 for the culmination of their annual reunion. Three civilian B-25s in warbird markings re-enacted the training take-off sessions, with personnel from NAS Pensacola as flight deck crew representing that service's contribution to the Tokyo raid.

The 919 SOW retired its fleet of C-145A Combat Coyote in December 2022.

== Role and operations ==
Although technically part of the larger nearby Eglin Air Force Base complex, today Duke Field is essentially a small air force base in its own right. Primarily an AFRC installation, Duke Field is hosted by the 919th Special Operations Wing (919 SOW), which operated the MC-130E Combat Talon I aircraft until April 2013 The 919 SOW previously operated the AC-130A Spectre gunship aircraft as flown by the 711 SOS prior to transitioning to the MC-130E in 1995.

The 919 SOW currently operates the MQ-9 Reaper, U-28A Draco and C-146A Wolfhound aircraft. As an AFRC unit, the 919 SOW is operationally gained by AFSOC, headquartered at nearby Hurlburt Field. The wing contains 13 squadrons, 2 of which are stationed at Hurlburt Field, Florida.

== Based units ==
Flying and notable non-flying units based at Duke Field.

Units marked GSU are Geographically Separate Units, which although based at Duke, are subordinate to a parent unit based at another location.

=== United States Air Force ===
Air Force Reserve Command (AFRC)

- Tenth Air Force
  - 919th Special Operations Wing (Host)
    - 919th Special Operations Group
      - 311th Special Operations Intelligence Squadron
      - 711th Special Operations Squadron
      - 859th Special Operations Squadron – Non-Standard Aviation (NSAV) mission
      - 919th Special Operations Support Squadron
    - 919th Special Operations Maintenance Group
      - 919th Special Operations Maintenance Squadron
      - 919th Special Operations Aircraft Maintenance Squadron
      - 919th Maintenance Operations Flight
    - 919th Special Operations Medical Squadron
    - 919th Special Operations Mission Support Group
      - 919th Special Operations Civil Engineer Squadron
      - 919th Special Operations Security Forces Squadron
      - 919th Special Operations Communications Squadron
      - 919th Special Operations Logistics Readiness Squadron
      - 919th Special Operations Force Support Squadron

Air Force Special Operations Command (AFSOC)

- 492d Special Operations Wing
  - 6th Special Operations Squadron (GSU)
  - 524th Special Operations Squadron (GSU) – C-146A Wolfhound

Air Force Materiel Command (AFMC)

- Air Force Test Center
  - 96th Test Wing
    - 96th Operations Group
      - 413th Flight Test Squadron (GSU) – CV-22 Osprey, HH-60W Jolly Green II, UH-1N Iroquois
      - Detachment 1 (GSU) – AC-130J Ghostrider, C-130 Hercules, HC-130J Combat King II, MC-130J Commando II

Air Force Global Strike Command (AFGSC)

- Detachment 7 – MH-139A Grey Wolf

== Infrastructure and facilities ==
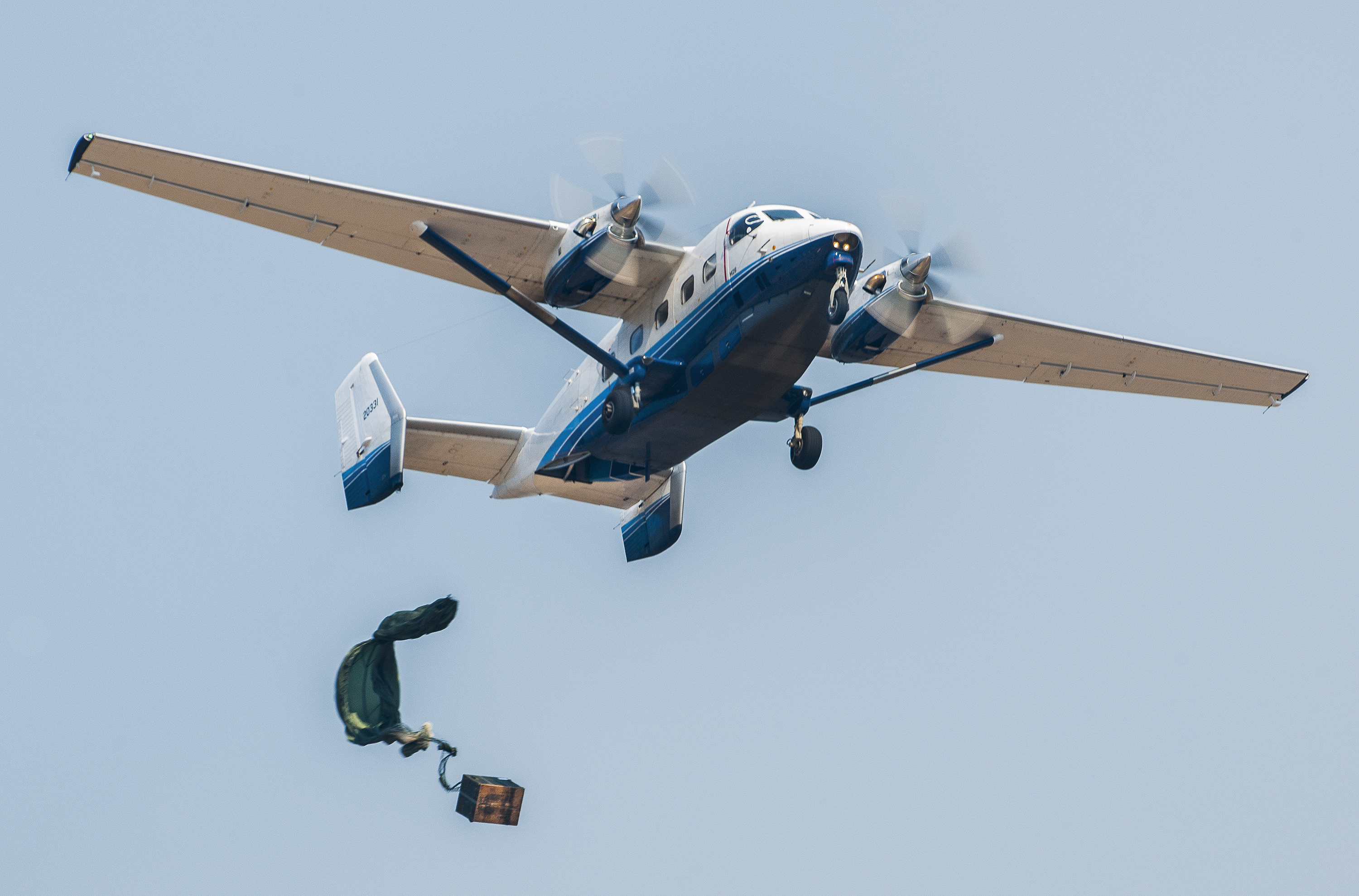
A parachuted bundle soars out of the back of a C-145 Skytruck during an air-drop mission over the Eglin Air Force Base range.

The installation is named for 1st Lt Robert L. Duke, who died in the crash of a Curtiss A-25A-20-CS Shrike, AAF Ser. No. 42-79823, near Spencer, Tennessee on 29 December 1943. He was assigned as Assistant A-3 to the Proving Ground of the AAF Proving Ground Command at Eglin Field, Florida, now Eglin Air Force Base.

The Duke Field installation is about 12 miles (19 km) north of the Eglin AFB East Gate on State Road 85.

Duke Field has two asphalt paved runways: Runway 18/36, measuring 8,025 x 150 ft (2,446 x 46 m) and Assault Runway 180/360, measuring 3,500 x 60 ft (1,067 x 18 m).

Although technically an auxiliary field to Eglin AFB, Duke Field is essentially a self-contained installation. The airfield has its own air traffic control tower, security forces building, Air Force Fire Protection facilities (Fire Station #8), instrument landing system (ILS), TACAN and support infrastructure such as a large flight line/ramp area, hangars, shoppette, self service gas station, hotel service, fitness track, recreational areas, maintenance facilities and other operational and administrative support buildings.

== See also ==
- Florida World War II Army Airfields
