= Wagner Field =

Military airfield in Florida

Wagner Field Eglin Air Force Base Auxiliary Field #1
- Part of Eglin Air Force Base
- Located near: Valparaiso, Florida
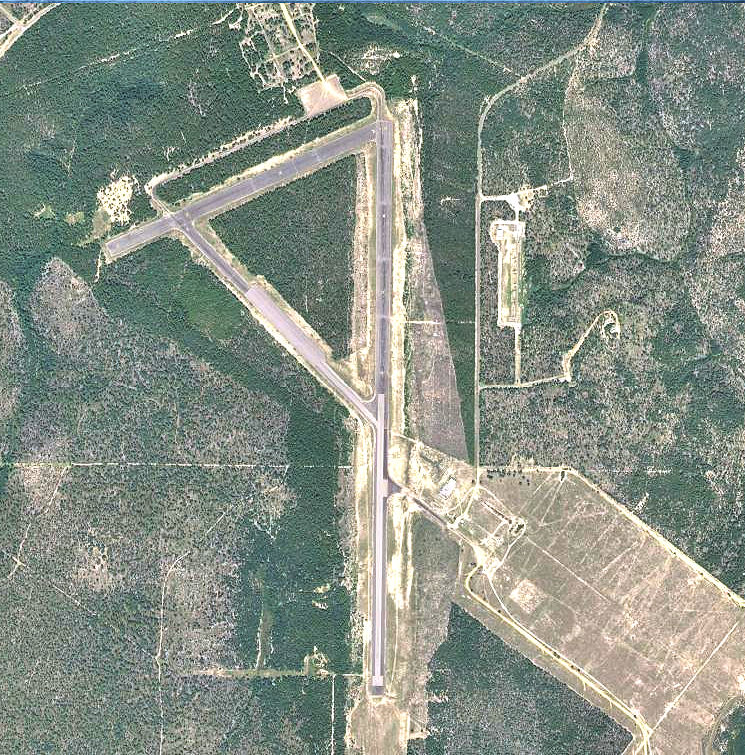
- 2006 USGS airphoto

Site information
- Controlled by: United States Air Force; Eglin Air Force Base

Location
- Location within Florida
- Coordinates: 30°40′12″N 086°21′00″W

Site history
- Built: 1941
- In use: 1941-1971
- Battles/wars: World War II

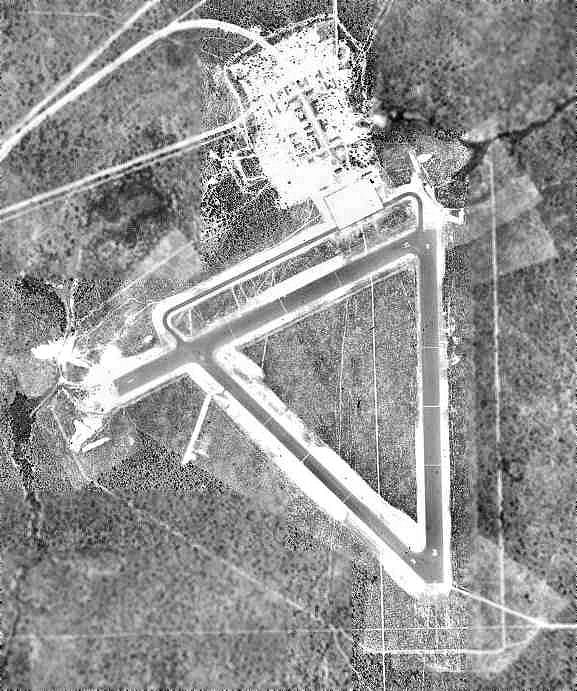
1949 airphoto of Wagner Field, showing runway markings used by the Doolittle Raiders in their training

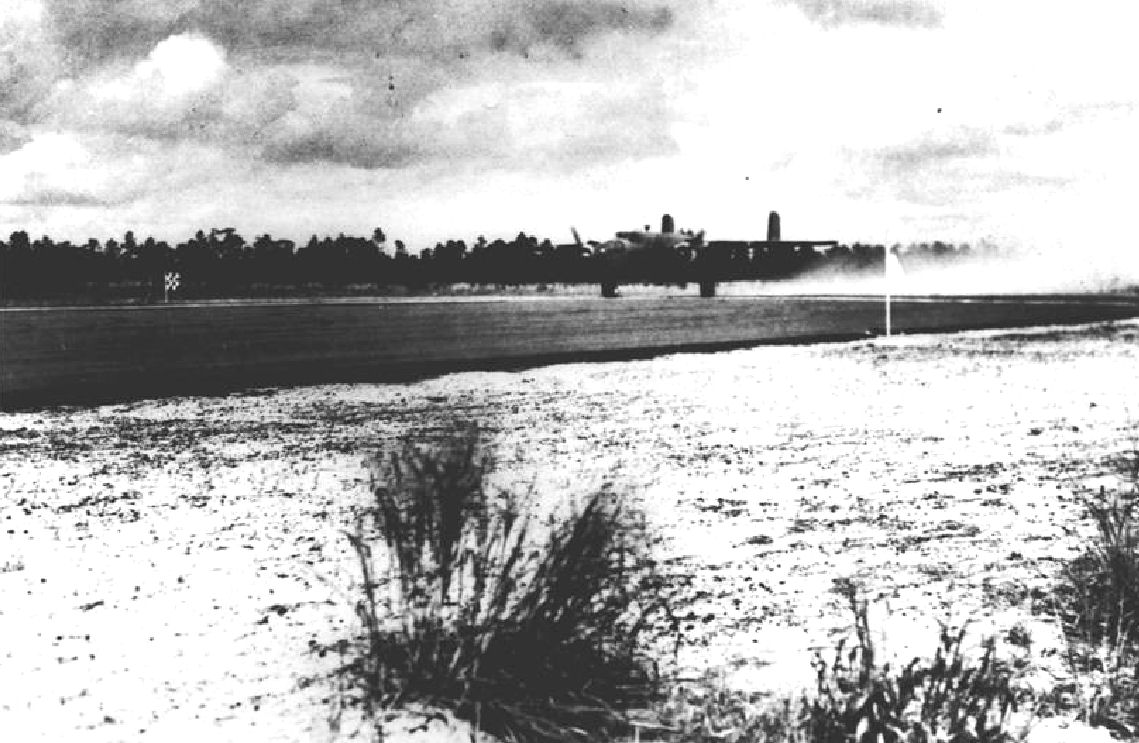
Doolittle B-25 testing at Wagner Field FL - March 1942.

Wagner Field, (Formerly: Eglin Air Force Auxiliary Field #1), is a component of Eglin Air Force Base, Florida. It is located northeast of the main base, 13.9 miles northeast of Valparaiso, Florida.

The site is notable as the training location for the Doolittle Raiders in early 1942, and the test location for the Credible Sport YMC-130H STOL 1980 Iranian Hostage rescue attempt aircraft.

== History ==
With the onset of World War II, the Eglin Field military reservation was greatly expanded when the Choctawhatchee National Forest was turned over to the War Department by the U.S. Forestry Service on 18 October 1940, and a series of auxiliary airfields were constructed from January 1941. Work on Auxiliary Field 1, consisting of a triangular set of runways, began 27 November 1940. $800,000 was allocated for the grading and paving of fields 1, 3, 5, and 6 on 24 April 1941.

Auxiliary Field 1 was subsequently named Wagner Field for Major Walter J. Wagner, USAAF, former commanding officer for the 1st Proving Ground, Eglin Field, who was killed 10 October 1943 in the crash of AT-6C-NT Texan, AAF Ser. No. 41-32187, c/n 88-9677, at Eglin Auxiliary Field 2.

=== World War II ===
In March 1942, Field 1 and Aux Field #3 (Duke Field) was utilized for training by the Doolittle Raiders in preparation for their raid on Japan. A close examination of imagery of the runways still showing markings from 1942 on the surface laid down by United States Navy personnel in early 1942 delineating distances used for simulating a World War II aircraft carrier flight deck. This provided the B-25 Mitchell pilots training in short-distance takeoffs which was needed in order to conduct the raid on Japan.

North of the airfield several wooden buildings were constructed as barracks and administrative offices. These were used by the Doolittle personnel during their training. Afterwards, the buildings were closed and sealed. About 1955, the buildings were cleaned out and presumably torn down due to their deteriorated state. It was recorded that inside the buildings remained an orderly room that contained numerous orders, records and notes, some signed by Doolittle. Unfortunately these records were not preserved.

A metal launching rail for the Republic-Ford JB-2, a United States copy of the German V-1 flying bomb, was erected on the southeast side of the airfield (30°39′46″N 086°20′41″W) approximately 1944. After the war, it was likely used by the 1st Experimental Guided Missiles Group for testing the weapon until 1949 when it was abandoned. It remains intact and visible today in aerial imagery.

=== Cold War ===
With the construction of the Eglin Air Force Base Railroad in 1951 from a connection with the Louisville and Nashville Railroad at Mossy Head, N of Wagner Field, to the Main Base, a spur line was built serving Auxiliary Field 1. The line, which ceased operation in the late 1970s, had already lifted the track to Wagner before this military rail connection was abandoned.

=== Credible Sport ===
In 1980, flight testing of modified YMC-130 Hercules transports for Operation Credible Sport took place at Wagner Field. The test bed aircraft, 74-2065, was ready for its first test flight on 18 September 1980, just three weeks after the project was initiated. The first fully modified aircraft, 74-1683, was delivered on 17 October to TAB 1, as the disused Wagner Field was designated. Between 19 October and 28 October, numerous flights were made testing various aspects, including the double-slotted flaps system, which enabled the C-130 to fly at 85 knots on final approach at a very steep eight-degree glide slope. All aspects worked flawlessly, and a full profile test was scheduled for 29 October.

During the test, the Lockheed crew determined that the computer used to command the firing of the rockets during the landing sequence needed further calibration to perform the crucial firing sequence during landing, and elected to manually input commands. The reverse-mounted (forward-facing) eight ASROC rockets were situated in pairs on the upper curvature of the fuselage behind the cockpit, and at the midpoint of each side of the fuselage beneath the uppers. Testing had determined that the upper pairs, fired sequentially, could be ignited while still airborne (specifically, at 20 feet), the lower pairs could only be fired after the aircraft was on the ground. The flight engineer, blinded by the firing of the upper deceleration rockets, thought the aircraft was on the runway and fired the lower set early, while the descent-braking rockets did not fire at all. Later unofficial disclaimers alleged to have been made by some members of the Lockheed test crew asserted that the lower rockets fired themselves through an undetermined computer or electrical malfunction, which at the same time failed to fire the descent-braking rockets.

As a result, the aircraft's forward flight vector was reduced to near zero, dropping it to the north-south runway and tearing off the starboard wing between the third and fourth engines. During rollout the trailing wing ignited a fire, but crash response teams extinguished the fire within eight seconds of the aircraft stopping, enabling the crew to exit the aircraft without injury. 74-1683 was destroyed but most of its unique systems were salvaged. The wrecked hull was buried at Wagner. With the election of Ronald Reagan to the presidency in November 1980, the rescue mission plan was dropped.

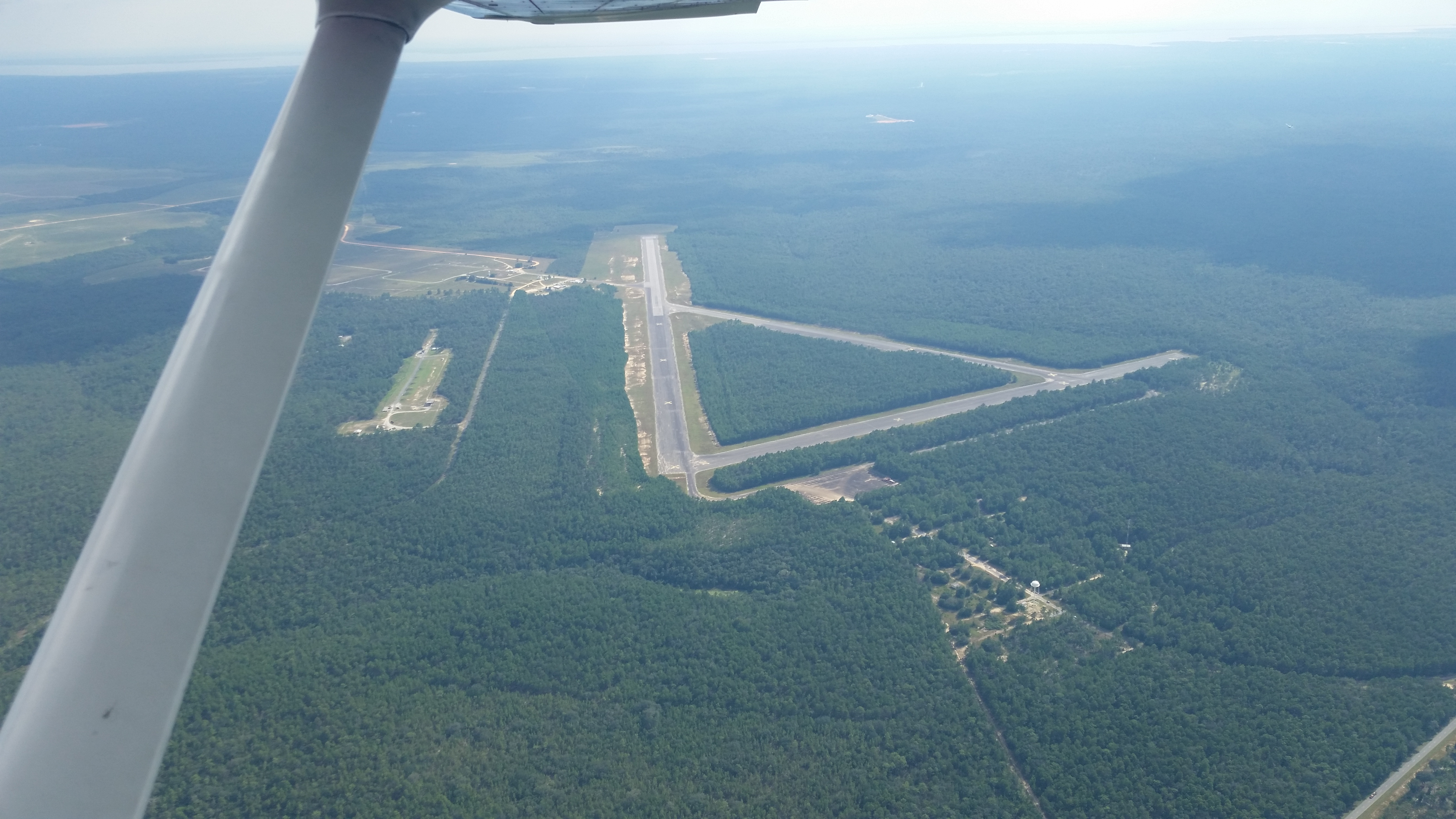
Aerial shot of Wagner Field (Eglin Air Force Aux #1). September 2021

=== Current status ===
The airfield was incorporated into Eglin AFB on 1 June 1971 and was inactivated. However, the airfield remains under the jurisdiction of the 96th Air Base Wing (96 ABW) as part of the active Eglin base and is not accessible to the public. That being said, a 2012 inspection of the north-south runway revealed recent touch-down and turn-around tread marks on the south end of the same runway upon which the Credible Sport tests took place, with a landing gear track that suggests that 1st SOW special operations C-130 Hercules variants (MC-130, etc.) may still be utilizing the historic field.

== Doolittle Raider reunion ==
For the 2008 gathering of Doolittle mission survivors, six crew were present for recognition in Fort Walton Beach, Florida, culminating in a reenactment of the training sessions by three civilian-owned B-25 Mitchells at Duke Field, Auxiliary Field 3, on 31 May, which had also hosted mission training. Navy personnel from NAS Pensacola, as flight deck "shirt" crew, represented that service's contribution to the Tokyo mission. Thought had been given to using Wagner Field for the ceremonies, but investigation showed the taxiways at the disused field were in better shape than the runway.

== See also ==
- Florida World War II Army Airfields
