= Operation Credible Sport =

1980 planned US military operation during the Iranian Hostage Crisis

Operation Credible Sport was a joint project of the U.S. military in the second half of 1980 to prepare for a second rescue attempt of the hostages held in Iran. The concept included using a Lockheed C-130 Hercules airlifter modified with the addition of rocket engines to make it a short take off and landing (STOL) capable aircraft able to land on the field within a soccer stadium in Tehran. Operation Credible Sport was terminated when on 2 November, the Iranian parliament accepted an Algerian plan for release of the hostages, followed two days later by Ronald Reagan's election as the U.S. president.

The concept of a large military transport STOL aircraft was carried forward in 1981–1982, with the follow-up Credible Sport II project. The project used one of the original Operation Credible Sport aircraft as the YMC-130 prototype for the MC-130H Combat Talon II.

== Credible Sport ==
=== Background ===
Within two weeks of the failure of Operation Eagle Claw, an attempted rescue of the hostages in Iran, the Pentagon began planning for a second mission. The first mission failed due to equipment and coordination problems, culminating in the crash of an RH-53D Sea Stallion helicopter into a parked C-130 Hercules in the Iranian desert, killing eight servicemen.

A new organization, the Joint Test Directorate (JTD), was established to assist and support the Office of Secretary of Defense Directorate (OSD) joint planning staff. Under the name "Honey Badger", the JTD conducted a series of large-scale joint-force exercises and projects to develop and validate a variety of capabilities that would be available to OSD when mission requirements were identified. JTD trained a large and diverse force of U.S. Army and U.S. Air Force special operations and aviation units, but the critical factor remained extracting the rescue team and freed hostages from Tehran. The Credible Sport project, a joint undertaking of the U.S. Air Force, U.S. Navy, and Lockheed-Georgia, was created within Honey Badger to develop a reliable extraction capability. The Credible Sport project team was tasked to create a large "Super STOL" fixed-wing aircraft to extract the rescue team and hostages and overcome the "weak link" in the previous plan, the heavy lift helicopter.

=== Concept ===
The Credible Sport concept called for a modified C-130 Hercules cargo plane to land in the Amjadien Stadium across the street from the U.S. Embassy and airlift out Delta Force soldiers and the rescued hostages. The aircraft would then be flown to and landed on an aircraft carrier for immediate medical treatment of an expected 50 wounded. (A U.S. Marine Corps KC-130 on loan to the U.S. Navy had been previously landed on the aircraft carrier USS Forrestal (CVA-59) in November 1963 as part of a Naval Air Systems Command demonstration.) Three MC-130 Combat Talon crews (all were Operation Eagle Claw veterans) were assigned to fly the three aircraft, drawn from the 463rd Tactical Airlift Wing, with the concept plan calling for the mission of two aircraft (one primary and one spare) to originate in the U.S., reaching Iran by five in flight refuelings, and penetrate at low altitude in the dark to evade Iranian air defenses.

=== Development ===
Three C-130s were modified under a top secret project at Eglin Air Force Base Auxiliary Field #1 (Wagner Field), Florida. The contract called for two to be modified to the proposed XFC-130H configuration within 90 days, and the third to be used as a test bed for various rocket packages blistered onto the forward and aft fuselage, which theoretically enabled the aircraft to land and take off within the sports arena's confines. (A fourth aircraft, an EC-130 ABCCC, was used as the interior mockup airframe for simulator training.)

After Lockheed was requested on 27 June 1980 to begin preliminary engineering studies on an STOL Hercules, the use of JATO units was explored, since these had previously been used to power takeoffs. Lockheed reported on 16 July that 58 JATO bottles (more than seven times greater than normal) would be required and that arresting gear would be insufficient to stop the C-130 in the required space. The U.S. Navy's Naval Air Weapons Station China Lake organization was then brought into the project to provide expertise on existing rocket motor power. Lockheed proceeded with work to structurally reinforce the C-130 airframe to withstand rocket forces and to develop a passenger restraint system for 150 persons.

The resulting XFC-130H aircraft were modified by the installation of 30 rockets in multiple sets: eight forward-pointed ASROC rocket motors mounted around the forward fuselage to stop the aircraft, eight downward-pointed Shrike rockets fuselage-mounted above the wheel wells to brake its descent, eight rearward-pointed MK-56 rockets (from the RIM-66 Standard missile) mounted on the lower rear fuselage for takeoff assist, two Shrikes mounted in pairs on wing pylons to correct yaw during takeoff transition, and two ASROCs mounted at the rear of the tail to prevent it from striking the ground from over-rotation.

Other STOL features included a dorsal and two ventral fins on the rear fuselage, double-slotted flaps and extended ailerons, a new radome, a tailhook for landing aboard an aircraft carrier, and Combat Talon avionics, including a Terrain Following/Terrain Avoidance radar, a defensive countermeasures suite, and a Doppler radar/GPS tie-in to the aircraft's inertial navigation system.

=== Testing ===
The test bed aircraft (AF serial 74-2065) was ready for its first test flight on 18 September 1980, just three weeks after the project's initiation. The first fully modified aircraft (74–1683) was delivered on 17 October to TAB 1 (Wagner Field/Eglin AF No. 1), a disused auxiliary airfield at Eglin Air Force Base, Florida. Between 19 October and 28 October, numerous flights were made testing various aspects, including the double-slotted flaps system, which enabled the C-130 to fly at 85 knots on final approach at a very steep eight-degree glide slope. All aspects worked flawlessly, and a full profile test was scheduled for 29 October.

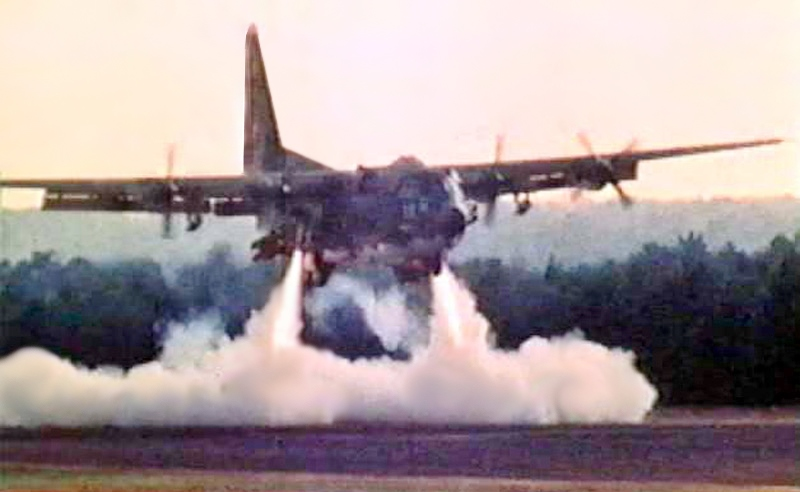
The C-130 prototype firing rockets to shorten its landing

The test's takeoff phase was executed flawlessly, setting a number of short takeoff records. The Lockheed test crew then assessed that the computer used to command the firing of the rockets during the landing sequence needed further calibration, and elected to manually input commands. The reverse-mounted (forward-facing) eight ASROC rockets for decelerating the aircraft's forward speed were situated in pairs on the fuselage's upper curvature behind the cockpit, and at the midpoint of each side of the fuselage beneath the uppers. Testing had determined that the upper pairs, fired sequentially, could be ignited while still airborne (specifically, at 20 feet), but that the lower pairs could only be fired after the aircraft was on the ground, with the descent-braking rockets also firing during the sequence.

The flight engineer, blinded by the firing of the upper deceleration rockets, thought the aircraft was on the runway and fired the lower set early. The descent-braking rockets did not fire at all. Later unofficial disclaimers allegedly made by some of the Lockheed test crew's members asserted that the lower rockets fired themselves through an undetermined computer or electrical malfunction, which at the same time failed to fire the descent-braking rockets.

As a result, the aircraft's forward flight was immediately reduced to nearly zero, dropping it hard to the runway and breaking the starboard wing between the third and fourth engines. During rollout, the trailing wing ignited a fire, but a medical evacuation helicopter dispersed the flame and crash response teams extinguished the fire within eight seconds of the aircraft stopping, enabling the crew to exit the aircraft safely. 74-1683 was dismantled and buried on-site for security reasons, but most of its unique systems were salvaged.

74-1686 was nearly ready for delivery, but the defeat of Jimmy Carter by Ronald Reagan in the 1980 U.S. presidential election, and the Algerian-negotiated release plan led to the rescue mission plan's cancellation. The hostages were subsequently released concurrent with Reagan's inauguration in January 1981.

== Credible Sport II ==
The remaining airframes were stripped of their rocket modifications and 74-2065 returned to regular airlift duties. 74-1686, however, retained its other Operation Credible Sport STOL modifications and was sent to Robins Air Force Base, Georgia. There, in July 1981, it was designated YMC-130H as the test bed for the MC-130 Combat Talon II's development, under the project name Credible Sport II. Phase I was conducted between 24 August – 11 November 1981, to test minor modifications to improve aerodynamics, satisfy Combat Talon II prototype requirements on STOL performance, handling characteristics, and avionics, and to establish safety margins.

Phase II testing began on 15 June 1982, continued through October 1982, and determined that the final configuration resulted in significant improvements in design, avionics, and equipment, and that the Combat Talon II design was ready for production. The 1st Special Operations Wing attempted to have the test bed transferred to operational duty as an interim Combat Talon II until production models became available, but Headquarters, Tactical Airlift Command disagreed. The cost of returning the YMC-130H to stock airlift configuration was more than its value, and it never flew again.

In 1988, 74–1686 was placed on display at the Museum of Aviation at Robins Air Force Base in Warner Robins, Georgia. As of February 2008, the other surviving Operation Credible Sport aircraft, 74-2065, was assigned to the 317th Airlift Group, 15th Expeditionary Mobility Task Force, at Dyess Air Force Base, Texas, in gray scheme with blue tail band. In mid 2018, tail number 74-1686 transferred and was moved by truck from Robins AFB to the Empire State Aerosciences Museum in Glenville, NY (on the grounds of Schenectady County Airport, near Albany, NY).
