= 919th Special Operations Wing =

US Air Force unit

919th Special Operations Wing
- Active: 1963–1965; 1971–present
- Country: United States
- Branch: United States Air Force
- Type: Wing
- Role: Special Operations
- Size: 1,600 personnel
- Part of: Air Force Reserve Command
- Garrison/HQ: Duke Field, Florida
- Decorations: Air Force Outstanding Unit Award

Commanders
- Current commander: Colonel Scott Hurrelbrink

Insignia
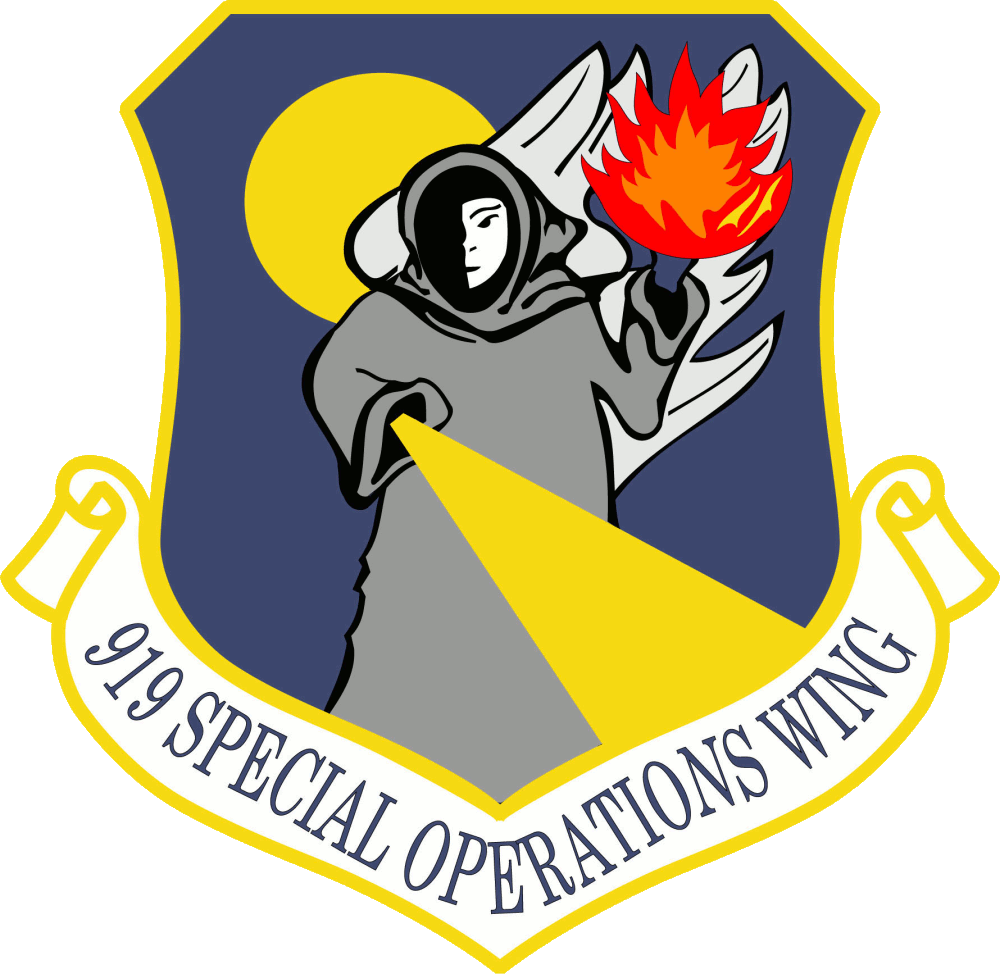
- 919 Special Operations Wing emblem (approved 21 August 1980)

Aircraft flown
- Transport: C-146A, AC-130J, U-28, MQ-9

The 919th Special Operations Wing (919 SOW) is an Air Reserve Component (ARC) unit of the United States Air Force. The 919 SOW is assigned to the Tenth Air Force of the Air Force Reserve Command (AFRC) and is stationed at Duke Field (Eglin Air Force Auxiliary Field #3), Florida.

The 919 SOW is an associate unit of the 1st Special Operations Wing (1 SOW), Air Force Special Operations Command (AFSOC), at nearby Hurlburt Field, Florida. If mobilized, the 919 SOW is operationally gained by AFSOC. The 919 SOW is the only AFRC special operations wing.

The wing is composed of approximately 1,600 reservists. Air Reserve Technicians, commonly referred to as ARTs, are the nucleus of the wing. They provide management continuity to keep units combat ready. ARTs carry dual status as full-time civil service employees for the Air Force who, as a condition of employment, must concurrently participate as Air Force Reservists, but who wear their uniforms and use their rank titles all the time. More than 280 ARTs and 47 civilians support the wing in day-to-day operations, augmented by approximately 900 Traditional Reservists (TR) during unit training assemblies, active duty periods, and mobilizations.

== History ==
=== Need for reserve troop carrier groups ===
During the first half of 1955, the Air Force began detaching Air Force Reserve squadrons from their parent wing locations to separate sites. The concept offered several advantages. Communities were more likely to accept the smaller squadrons than the large wings and the location of separate squadrons in smaller population centers would facilitate recruiting and manning. Continental Air Command (ConAC)'s plan called for placing Air Force Reserve units at fifty-nine installations located throughout the United States. When these relocations were completed in 1959, reserve wing headquarters and wing support elements would typically be on one base, along with one (or in some cases two) of the wing's flying squadrons, while the remaining flying squadrons were spread over thirty-five Air Force, Navy and civilian airfields under what was called the Detached Squadron Concept.

Although this dispersal was not a problem when the entire wing was called to active service, mobilizing a single flying squadron and elements to support it proved difficult. This weakness was demonstrated in the partial mobilization of reserve units during the Berlin Crisis of 1961 To resolve this, at the start of 1962, ConAC determined to reorganize its reserve wings by establishing groups with support elements for each of its troop carrier squadrons. This reorganization would facilitate mobilization of elements of wings in various combinations when needed. However, as this plan was entering its implementation phase, another partial mobilization occurred for the Cuban Missile Crisis, with the units being released on 22 November 1962. The formation of troop carrier groups occurred in January 1963 for units that had not been mobilized, but was delayed until February for those that had been.

=== Activation of 919th Troop Carrier Group ===
The 919th Troop Carrier Group (919 TCG) was established at Memphis Municipal Airport, Tennessee on 11 February 1963 as the headquarters for the 701st Troop Carrier Squadron, which had been stationed there since November 1957. Along with group headquarters, a Combat Support Squadron, Materiel Squadron and a Tactical Infirmary were organized to support the 701st.

The group's mission was to organize, recruit and train Air Force Reserve personnel in the tactical airlift of airborne forces, their equipment and supplies and delivery of these forces and materials by airdrop, landing or cargo extraction systems. The group was equipped with Fairchild C-123 Providers for Tactical Air Command airlift operations.

The 919th was one of three groups assigned to the 445th Troop Carrier Wing in 1963, the others being the 918th Troop Carrier Group at Dobbins Air Force Base, Georgia, and the 920th Troop Carrier Group, also at Memphis Municipal Airport, Tennessee. The 919 TCG was inactivated in December 1965.

In 1971, the 919th was reactivated and renamed the 919th Tactical Airlift Group (919 TAG), equipped with the Lockheed C-130A Hercules and based at Duke Field, Florida. It performed tactical airlift of personnel and cargo, in addition to airdropping United States Army paratroopers during exercises from 1971 to 1974.

=== Special Operations ===
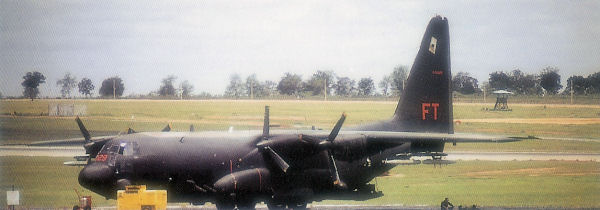
AC-130A, AF Ser. No. 55-0029, of the 16 SOS at Ubon RTAFB in May 1974. The following year, this aircraft was transferred to the Air Force Reserve's 711 SOS at Duke Field.

Redesignated the 919th Special Operations Group (919 SOG) on 1 July 1975, the group began transitioning to the Lockheed AC-130A Spectre aircraft and training for gunship operations, with close air support as a primary duty, but also including the ability to perform armed interdiction, reconnaissance, and escort, as well as forward air control (FAC) and combat search and rescue (CSAR) in conventional or unconventional warfare setting. In addition to its primary combat duties, the 919 SOG also provided range clearing support for missile launches at Cape Canaveral Air Force Station and along the Eastern Test Range from 1979 to 1989 and for NASA Space Shuttle launches at the John F. Kennedy Space Center from 1981 to 1988.

Mobilized for active duty for Operation JUST CAUSE, the then 919 SOG's 711th Special Operations Squadron's AC-130A aircraft hit key facilities and provided cover for U.S. Army troops during the invasion of Panama, December 1989 – January 1990. On 1 April 1990 the 919 SOG gained a second special operations squadron, the 71st, located at Davis-Monthan Air Force Base, Arizona. Both squadrons participated in the conflict in Southwest Asia: the 71 SOS, flying HH-3Es deployed 12 January 1991 – 16 March 1991 and the 711 SOS, flying AC-130As, deployed 7 February – 12 March. In addition, the 711 SOS used their AC-130As to fly cargo and passengers.

On 1 August 1992, the 919 SOG was upgraded to wing status and renamed the 919th Special Operations Wing (919 SOW). The 919 SOW lost the 71 SOS on 1 October 1993 but, in late 1994, gained the 5th Special Operations Squadron (5 SOS). The 5 SOS began to receive their MC-130P Combat Shadow aircraft in April 1995 and trained for special operations, aerial refueling of special operations helicopters, and resupply missions.

The 711 SOS transitioned from AC-130A gunships to MC-130E Combat Talon I and MC-130P Combat Shadow aircraft beginning in October 1995 and trained for a primary mission of infiltration, exfiltration and resupply of special operations forces. Periodically the wing deployed personnel and aircraft to support special operations forces in contingency operations worldwide, to include mobilization and forward deployment in 2001–2003 in support of Operation ENDURING FREEDOM and Operation IRAQI FREEDOM. The wing also continued to conduct numerous humanitarian deployments. While the 919 SOW would retire its MC-130P Combat Shadow aircraft in 2008, the wing continued to conduct flight training in MC-130E Combat Talon I for both Air Force Special Operations Command and Air Force Reserve Command from 1 October 1997 until the retirement of the MC-130E in 2013.

In 2008, the 919 SOW also added the U-28A Draco aircraft and MQ-1 Predator remotely piloted aircraft (RPA) to its inventory.

An Air Force news release dated 18 April 2013 announced the final flight of the wing's MC-130E aircraft, which was flown to the 309th Aerospace Maintenance and Regeneration Group (309 AMARG) "boneyard" at Davis-Monthan AFB, Arizona.

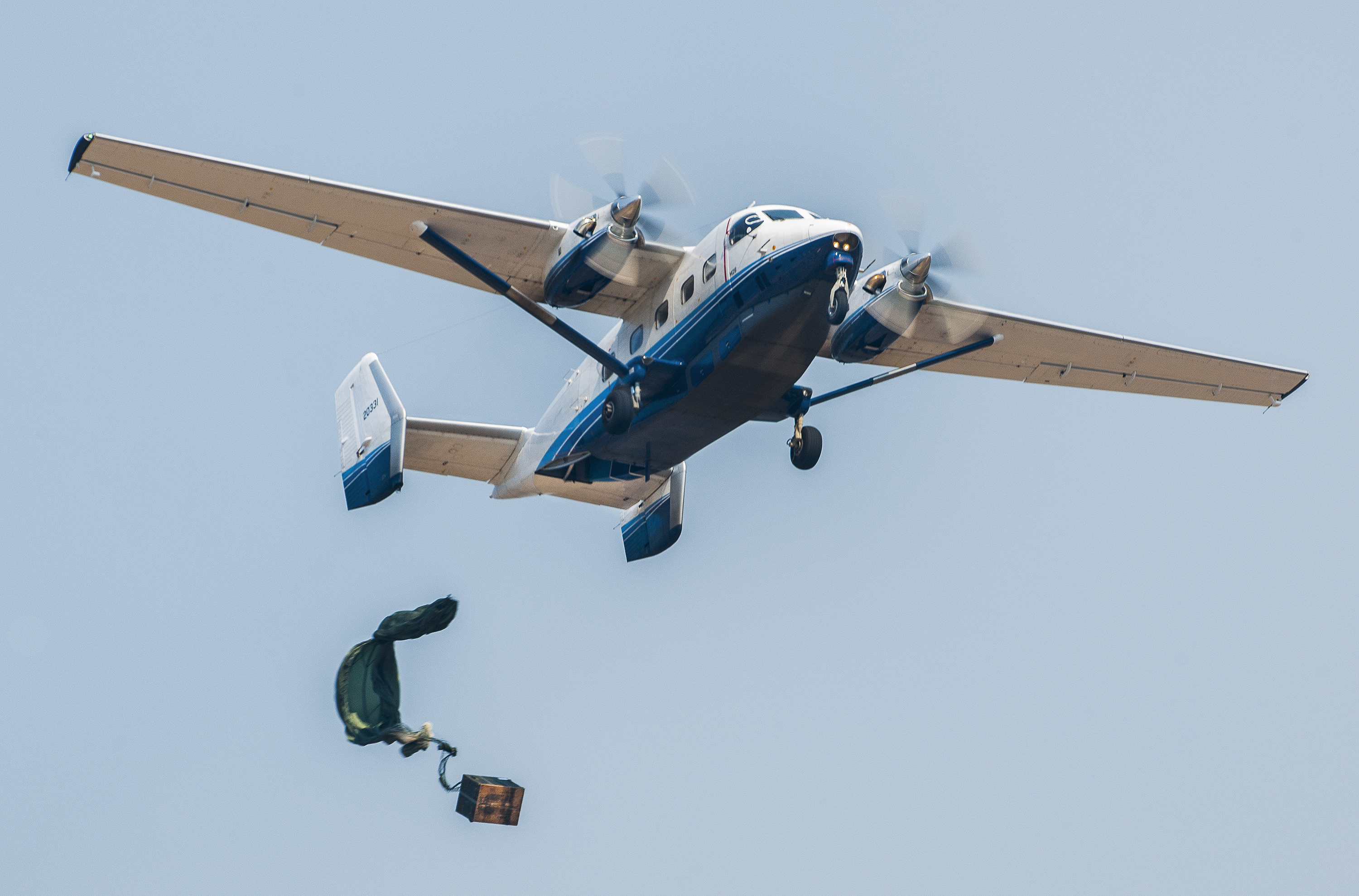
A parachuted bundle soars out of the back of a C-145A Skytruck during an air-drop mission over the Eglin AFB Range.

Retirement of the MC-130E marked the end of the 919 SOW's status with unit-owned aircraft and its transition to that of an "Associate" unit supporting and sharing aircraft with the active duty Regular Air Force's 1st Special Operations Wing and elements of the 492nd Special Operations Wing, both located at nearby Hurlburt Field. The 919 SOW's MC-130E Combat Talons were replaced with PZL C-145A Skytruck aircraft which had already begun arriving at Duke Field. Two years later, the C-145, U-28, and MQ-1 would be augmented by the arrival of the C-146A Wolfhound aircraft.

In 2015, the 711th commenced sharing buildings, flightline, aircraft and mission with the active duty 6th Special Operations Squadron (6 SOS) at Duke Field. The 6 SOS is a geographically separated unit (GSU) of the 492nd Special Operations Wing (492 SOW) at Hurlburt Field, Florida.

In 2018, the 919 SOW's MQ-1 aircraft were retired and replaced by the MQ-9 Reaper remotely piloted aircraft.

In February 2019, in addition to operating the U-28, select flight crews from the 919 SOW's 5th Special Operations Squadron commenced training on the AC-130J Ghostrider aircraft operated by the active duty 1 SOW at Hurlburt Field, qualifying in the aircraft later that year. In June 2020, the first all-Air Force Reserve crew qualified on the AC-130J and flew the aircraft without any active duty USAF personnel aboard, marking the first time that any series of the AC-130 aircraft had been flown by an all-Reserve crew since 1995.

In December 2022, the 919 SOW retired its last C-145A aircraft.

In July 2025, it was announced that the 711 SOS would relocate from Duke Field to Hurlburt Field as a geographically separated unit (GSU) of the 919 SOW and transition to the AC-130J Ghostrider aircraft.

== Units ==
- 919th Special Operations Wing, Duke Field, Florida
  - 919th Special Operations Group
    - 2nd Special Operations Squadron, MQ-9 Reaper, Hurlburt Field, Florida
    - 5th Special Operations Squadron, U-28A Draco, AC-130J Ghostrider, Hurlburt Field, Florida
    - 311th Special Operations Intelligence Squadron
    - 711th Special Operations Squadron, AC-130J Ghsotrider
    - 859th Special Operations Squadron, C-146A Wolfhound
    - 919th Special Operations Support Squadron
  - 919th Special Operations Mission Support Group
    - 919th Special Operations Civil Engineering Squadron
    - 919th Special Operations Security Forces Squadron
    - 919th Special Operations Communications Squadron
    - 919th Special Operations Logistics Readiness Squadron
    - 919th Special Operations Force Support Squadron
  - 919th Special Operations Maintenance Group
    - 919th Special Operations Maintenance Squadron
    - 919th Special Operations Aircraft Maintenance Squadron
    - 919th Maintenance Operations
  - 919th Special Operations Medical Squadron

== Lineage ==
- Established as the 919th Troop Carrier Group, Assault and activated on 15 January 1963 (not organized)

Organized in the Reserve on 11 February 1963
Discontinued and inactivated on 15 December 1965

- Redesignated 919th Tactical Airlift Group on 17 June 1971

Activated in the Reserve on 30 July 1971
Redesignated 919th Special Operations Group on 1 July 1975
Redesignated 919th Special Operations Wing on 1 August 1992

=== Assignments ===
- Continental Air Command, 15 January 1963 (not organized)
- 445th Troop Carrier Wing (later 445th Air Transport Wing), 11 February 1963 – 15 December 1965
- 459th Tactical Airlift Wing, 30 July 1971
- Eastern Air Force Reserve Region, 1 December 1974
- Tenth Air Force, 8 October 1976
- Fourth Air Force, 1 March 1983
- Tenth Air Force, 1 July 1994 – present

=== Components ===
- 919th Operations Group (later 919th Special Operations Group): 1 August 1992 – present
- 71st Special Operations Squadron: 1 April 1990 – 1 August 1992
- 701st Troop Carrier Squadron: 11 February 1963 – 15 December 1965
- 711th Tactical Airlift Squadron (later Special Operations Squadron): 30 July 1971 – 1 August 1992

=== Stations ===
- Memphis Municipal Airport, Tennessee, 11 February 1963 – 15 December 1965
- Eglin Air Force Base Auxiliary Field #3 (Duke Field), Florida, 30 July 1971 – present

=== Aircraft ===
- Fairchild C-123 Provider (1963–1965)
- Lockheed C-130A Hercules (1971–1975)
- Lockheed AC-130A Spectre (1975–1995)
- Sikorsky HH-3 Jolly Green Giant (1990–1993)
- Lockheed MC-130E Combat Talon (1995–2013)
- Lockheed MC-130P Combat Shadow (1995–2008)
- Pilatus U-28 Draco (2008–present)
- General Atomics MQ-1 Predator (2008–2018)
- PZL C-145A Skytruck (2013–2022)
- Dornier C-146A Wolfhound (2015–present)
- General Atomics MQ-9 Reaper (2018–present)

== Bibliography ==
- Cantwell, Gerald T. (1997). Citizen Airmen: a History of the Air Force Reserve, 1946-1994. Washington, D.C.: Air Force History and Museums Program. ISBN 0-16049-269-6.
- Maurer, Maurer, ed. (1982) [1969]. Combat Squadrons of the Air Force, World War II (PDF) (reprint ed.). Washington, DC: Office of Air Force History. ISBN 0-405-12194-6. LCCN 70605402. OCLC 72556. Archived from the original (PDF) on 20 December 2016.
- Ravenstein, Charles A. (1984). Air Force Combat Wings, Lineage & Honors Histories 1947-1977. Washington, DC: Office of Air Force History. ISBN 0-912799-12-9.
