= Deaths in September 2007 =

The following is a list of notable deaths in September 2007.

Entries for each day are listed alphabetically by surname. A typical entry lists information in the following sequence:

- Name, age, country of citizenship at birth, subsequent country of citizenship (if applicable), reason for notability, cause of death (if known), and reference.

== September 2007 ==
=== 1 ===
- Robert H. Ahmanson, 80, American businessman and philanthropist, heart attack.
- Tomás Medina Caracas, 42, Colombian guerrilla member of FARC, military action.
- Russell Ellington, 69, American basketball coach for the Harlem Globetrotters, lung cancer.
- Sir Abraham Goldberg, 83, Scottish doctor and medical scientist.
- Sally Haley, 99, American painter, natural causes.
- Sir Roy McKenzie, 84, New Zealand philanthropist, harness racing breeder, trainer and competitor.
- Viliam Schrojf, 76, Slovak football goalkeeper.
- John T. Scott, 67, American sculptor and artist.

=== 2 ===
- Rajae Belmlih, 45, Moroccan singer, cancer.
- Anthony Day, 74, American editorial page editor for the Los Angeles Times, emphysema.
- Robert Fidgeon, 65, Australian television columnist and critic, cancer.
- Safet Isović, 71, Bosnian singer.
- Marcia Mae Jones, 83, American actress (Heidi, These Three).
- Max McNab, 83, Canadian ice hockey player, coach, and NHL general manager.
- Pat Norton, 88, Australian Olympic backstroke swimmer.
- Bill Robinson, 88, Australian rules footballer.

=== 3 ===
- Carter Albrecht, 34, American keyboardist and guitarist (Edie Brickell & New Bohemians), shot.
- Clarke Bynum, 45, American basketball player (Clemson Tigers), 2000 hijack hero, cancer.
- Gustavo Eberto, 24, Argentine footballer (Boca Juniors), testicular cancer.
- Sir Hamish Forbes, 91, British soldier and aristocrat.
- Steve Fossett, 63, American adventurer, aircrash.
- Jan Gulbrandsen, 69, Norwegian politician, hurdler, and Olympian (1960).
- Syd Jackson, 68, New Zealand Māori rights activist, cancer.
- Kauko Jalkanen, 88, Finnish Olympic fencer (1948, 1952).
- Gift Leremi, 22, South African international footballer, car accident.
- Don Maloney, 79, American writer, author on Japan.
- Janis Martin, 67, American singer, cancer.
- Lord Michael Pratt, 61, British writer and aristocrat.
- Steve Ryan, 60, American actor (The West Wing, American Dreams, Daddio).
- Mária Szepes, 98, Hungarian writer.
- Jane Tomlinson, 43, British cancer activist, cancer.

=== 4 ===
- Michael Evans, 87, American actor.
- Bhamidipati Radhakrishna, 77, Indian playwright and scriptwriter.
- Kumari Rukmani, 78, Indian actress and dancer.
- Gigi Sabani, 54, Italian television host, heart attack.
- John Scott, 9th Duke of Buccleuch, 83, British politician and aristocrat.
- Ryūzō Sejima, 95, Japanese academic, chairman of the board of Asia University, World War II strategist.

=== 5 ===
- Julieta Campos, 75, Cuban-Mexican writer, cancer.
- Duan Yihe, 61, Chinese congress member who arranged the murder of his mistress, execution.
- Jennifer Dunn, 66, American Representative from Washington (1993–2005), pulmonary embolism.
- Grete Frederiksen, 89, Danish Olympic swimmer (1936).
- Paul Gillmor, 68, American Representative from Ohio since 1989.
- Edward Gramlich, 68, American economics professor, governor of the Federal Reserve System, lymphocytic leukemia.
- Charlotte Zucker, 86, American actress.
- Thomas Hansen, 31, Norwegian musician known as "Saint Thomas", combination of prescribed drugs.
- D. James Kennedy, 76, American evangelical Protestant pastor and theologian, founder of Coral Ridge Ministries.
- Nikos Nikolaidis, 67, Greek film director, pulmonary edema.

=== 6 ===
- Martin Čech, 31, Czech international ice hockey player, car accident.
- Eva Crane, 95, British bee expert.
- Allan Crite, 97, American artist, natural causes.
- Billy Darnell, 81, American professional wrestler of the 1940s–1960s famous for feuds with Buddy Rogers.
- Wolfgang Franke, 95, German sinologist.
- Evald Gering, 89, Canadian Olympic shooter (1960).
- Ian Gray, 69, British comics writer.
- Jack Hawkes, 92, British botanist.
- John Kelly, 71, Provisional Irish Republican Army founder-member and Northern Ireland Assembly member (1998–2003), cancer.
- Al Kozar, 86, American baseball player (Washington Senators, Chicago White Sox).
- Madeleine L'Engle, 88, American writer (A Wrinkle in Time), natural causes.
- Lee Ae-jung, 20, South Korean actress, complications of brain cancer.
- Ronald Magill, 87, British actor (Amos Brearly on Emmerdale Farm).
- Bill Muller, 42, American film critic and journalist.
- Luciano Pavarotti, 71, Italian operatic tenor, pancreatic cancer.
- Percy Rodriguez, 89, Canadian character actor and movie trailer narrator, kidney problems.
- Byron Stevenson, 50, British footballer (Wales, Leeds United, Birmingham City), throat cancer.

=== 7 ===
- Alex, 31, American-born African grey parrot, subject of animal language experiments.
- Sir John Compton, 82, St. Lucian Prime Minister (1979, 1982–1996, 2006–2007), stroke.
- Ed Cook, 75, American football player (Notre Dame Fighting Irish, Chicago/St. Louis Cardinals, Atlanta Falcons).
- Norman Deeley, 73, British footballer (Wolverhampton Wanderers).
- Russell E. Dougherty, 87, American former commander in chief of the Strategic Air Command.
- Joseph W. Eschbach, 74, American doctor and kidney specialist whose research led to treatment of anemia, cancer.
- Joseph Rudolph Grimes, 84, Liberian foreign minister (1960–1972).
- Deacon Jones, 73, American steeplechase runner and Olympian (1956, 1960).
- Sidney Leviss, 90, American politician and judge.
- Gabriel Baccus Matthews, 59, Liberian foreign minister (1980–1981, 1990–1993).
- Mark Weil, 55, Uzbek theatre director, stabbed.

=== 8 ===
- Frederick Andrew, 67, British Olympic skier (1964, 1968).
- Lord Bethell, 69, British historian of Eastern and Central Europe, human rights campaigner, Parkinson's disease.
- Jean-François Bizot, 63, French journalist, creator of "Actuel", Radio Nova, cancer.
- Harry Kure, 79, Norwegian footballer.
- István Lang, 74, Hungarian Olympic cyclist (1952).
- Adrian Esquino Lisco, 68, Salvadoran indigenous rights activist and spiritual chief, complications from diabetes.
- Vincent Serventy, 91, Australian writer and conservationist.

=== 9 ===
- Sir John Anderson, 91, British army officer.
- Hannes Brewis, 87, South African rugby union player.
- Angie Brooks, 78, Liberian diplomat and jurist.
- Ian Campbell, 81, British politician, MP for Dunbartonshire West (1970–1983) and Dumbarton (1983–1987).
- Han Dingxiang, 70, Chinese Roman Catholic prelate, detained for loyalty to the Vatican.
- ASHK Sadek, 73, Bangladeshi politician.
- Helmut Senekowitsch, 73, Austrian football player and manager.
- Zoran Tadić, 66, Croatian film director.
- Hughie Thomasson, 55, American guitarist (Outlaws), heart attack.
- Sir Tasker Watkins VC, 88, British jurist and businessman, Lord Justice of Appeal and former WRU President, after short illness.
- Xu Simin, 93, Hong Kong magazine publisher, pro-Beijing supporter, organ failure.

=== 10 ===
- Loretta King Hadler, 90, American film actress, natural causes.
- James Leasor, 83, British novelist and biographer.
- Joe Rantz, 93, American rower who competed in the 1936 Summer Olympics.
- Dame Anita Roddick, 64, British entrepreneur and founder of The Body Shop, brain haemorrhage.
- Arthur Ross, 96, American businessman and philanthropist known for his contribution to Central Park.
- Joe Sherlock, 76, Irish Teachta Dála for Cork East (1981–1982, 1987–1992, 2002–2007).
- Ted Stepien, 82, American businessman and former owner of the Cleveland Cavaliers basketball team.
- Enrique Torres, 85, American professional wrestler.
- Jane Wyman, 90, American actress (Johnny Belinda, Falcon Crest, The Blue Veil), Oscar winner (1949).

=== 11 ===
- John Garrett, 76, British politician, MP for Norwich South 1974–1983 and 1987–1997.
- Ian Porterfield, 61, British footballer and manager (scored Sunderland's 1973 FA Cup winner), colon cancer.
- Gene Savoy, 80, American explorer and religious mystic, claimed discovery of over 40 lost cities in Peru, natural causes.
- James F. Smith, 84, American politician.
- Willie Tee, 63, American singer-songwriter and producer, colon cancer.
- Joe Zawinul, 75, Austrian jazz keyboardist and composer, founder of Weather Report, cancer.

=== 12 ===
- Ambrosio Aimar, 84, Argentine Olympic cyclist (1948).
- Bobby Byrd, 73, American soul/funk singer, cancer.
- Daryl Holton, 45, American convicted murderer, first man executed by electric chair in Tennessee in 47 years.
- Phil Frank, 64, American cartoonist, brain cancer.
- Lou Kretlow, 86, American baseball pitcher.

=== 13 ===
- Gaetano Arfé, 81, Italian politician.
- Robert Bates, 96, American mountaineer.
- Laurel Burch, 61, American artist, osteopetrosis.
- Phil Frank, 64, American cartoonist, brain tumor.
- Bill Griffiths, 59, British poet and Anglo-Saxon scholar.
- Billie Harvey, 57, American racing driver.
- Augie Hiebert, 90, American who built Alaska's first television station (KTVA), cancer.
- Neville Jeffress, 87, Australian founder of Media Monitors Australia, pneumonia.
- Colin Mitchell, 78, English cricketer.
- Clare Oliver, 26, Australian cancer activist, melanoma.
- Abdul Sattar Buzaigh al-Rishawi, 34-35, Iraqi leader of the Anbar Salvation Council, bomb.
- Whakahuihui Vercoe, 79, New Zealand retired Anglican archbishop.

=== 14 ===
- Larry Flynn, 77, American racing driver.
- Sir Robert Honeycombe, 86, British metallurgist.
- Gary Hubler, 52, American aviator, aviation accident.
- Jacques Martin, 74, French presenter and former husband of Cécilia Sarkozy, cancer.
- Emilio Ruiz del Río, 84, Spanish set decorator (Pan's Labyrinth), respiratory failure.
- Benny Vansteelant, 30, Belgian world champion duathlete, bike accident.

=== 15 ===
- Leslie Holligan, 29, Guyanese footballer, heart failure.
- Eileen Holt, 76, Argentine swimmer and Olympian (1948).
- Generoso Jiménez, 90, Cuban trombone player.
- Colin McRae, 39, British World Rally champion, helicopter crash.
- Sir Jeremy Moore, 79, British soldier, commander of UK land forces in the Falklands War.
- Specs Powell, 85, American jazz drummer, kidney disease.
- Ernie Renzel, 100, American politician, Mayor of San Jose (1945–1946), "Father of San Jose International Airport."
- Aldemaro Romero, 79, Venezuelan composer, pianist and conductor, complications of intestinal blockage.
- Brett Somers, 83, American actress, comedian and panelist (Match Game), stomach and colon cancer.

=== 16 ===
- Jean Balissat, 71, Swiss musician.
- Peter Cleeland, 69, Australian politician, MHR for McEwen (1984–1990, 1993–1996), motor neurone disease.
- Robert Jordan, 58, American fantasy novelist (The Wheel of Time), cardiac amyloidosis.
- Cal Rampton, 93, American politician, Governor of Utah (1965–1977), cancer.
- Buster Ramsey, 87, American football player and coach, pneumonia.

=== 17 ===
- René Collet, 76, French Olympic alpine skier (1956).
- Jim Furner, 79, Australian military intelligence chief.
- Rappani Khalilov, 37, Chechen militant, leader of the Shariat Jamaat, terrorist, killed by Russian troops.
- Maurice King, 72, American basketball player (Boston Celtics, Chicago Zephyrs).
- Charlotte Lewis, 52, American basketball player.
- Stephen Medcalf, 70, British scholar.

=== 18 ===
- Augustus Akinloye, 91, Nigerian politician, founder of the Ibadan Peoples Party.
- Benyamin Yosef Bria, 51, Indonesian Roman Catholic prelate, Bishop of Denpasar.
- Norman Gaylord, 84, American chemist, developed permeable contact lens.
- Bob Gehrke, 69, Australian rugby league footballer.
- Nate Hill, 41, American football player (Green Bay Packers, Miami Dolphins, Washington Redskins).
- Len Thompson, 60, Australian footballer (1965–1980), heart attack.

=== 19 ===
- Bassem Hamad al-Dawiri, 34, Iraqi sculptor, replaced Saddam Hussein statue toppled during 2003 invasion of Iraq, car accident.
- Antoine Ghanem, 64, Lebanese politician, MP, car bomb.
- Larry Hartshorn, 74, American football player (Kansas State Wildcats, Chicago Cardinals).
- Mike Osborne, 66, British jazz musician.
- Vlatko Pavletić, 76, Croatian politician, Speaker of Parliament (1995–1999), acting President (1999–2000).
- Hiram Emory Widener Jr., 83, American jurist (United States Court of Appeals for the Fourth Circuit), lung cancer.

=== 20 ===
- Mahlon Clark, 84, American clarinetist, natural causes.
- Franco Fanti, 83, Italian Olympic cyclist (1948).
- Thomas Aquinas Flannery, 89, American district judge (United States District Court for the District of Columbia).
- Helen Freeman, 75, American endangered species (snow leopards) advocate, lung disease.
- Johnny Gavin, 79, Irish international footballer and Norwich City's record goalscorer.
- Kaljo Kiisk, 81, Estonian actor, film director and politician.
- Viktor Shershunov, 56, Russian governor of Kostroma Oblast, car accident.
- Laba Sosseh, 64, Senegalese singer.
- Sir Edward Tomkins, 91, British diplomat, ambassador to The Netherlands and France.

=== 21 ===
- Hallgeir Brenden, 78, Norwegian cross country skier, gold medallist (1952, 1956, 1960).
- Bob Collins, 61, Australian ALP senator (1987–1998) and minister (1990–1996), suicide by alcohol and drug overdose.
- Alice Ghostley, 84, American actress (Designing Women, To Kill a Mockingbird, Grease), Tony winner (1965), colon cancer.
- Ian Gilmour, Baron Gilmour of Craigmillar, 81, British politician.
- Rex Humbard, 88, American televangelist, congestive heart failure.
- Walter Jones, 81, Bermudian Olympic sailor (1960).
- António Jonet, 80, Portuguese Olympic pentathlete (1952).
- Paul Konsler, 94, French Olympic shooter (1952).
- Floria Lasky, 84, American entertainment attorney and litigator, cancer.
- Ángel Romero, 75, Mexican Olympic cyclist.
- Petar Stambolić, 95, Serbian Prime Minister of the Socialist Republic of Serbia (1978–1982), President of Yugoslavia (1982–1983).
- Carl Eugene Watts, 53, American serial killer, complications of prostate cancer.
- Wu Xiangxiang, 92, Chinese historian.

=== 22 ===
- Albert Fuller, 81, American harpsichordist and founder of the Aston Magna Foundation and Festival.
- Herbert Gallen, 92, American chairman and owner of Ellen Tracy sportswear.
- Nick Halsted, 64, British fencer and Olympian (1968).
- Bill Harman, 88, American baseball player (Philadelphia Phillies).
- Richard Hornby, 85, British politician and businessman.
- Marcel Marceau, 84, French mime artist.
- William D. Rogers, 80, American advisor to Henry Kissinger, heart attack.
- ʻAlí-Muhammad Varqá, 95, Iranian-born leader in the Baháʼí Faith.

=== 23 ===
- Renzo Barbieri, 67, Italian writer.
- Ken Danby, 67, Canadian painter.
- Ivan Hinderaker, 91, American academic, chancellor of the University of California, Riverside (1964–1979).
- John Klier, 62, British-American writer and historian.

=== 24 ===
- Odd Andersen, 87, Norwegian footballer.
- David Anyim, 42, Kenyan boxer and Olympian (1992).
- Geoff Cannell, 65, Manx Member of the House of Keys and sports broadcaster, stroke.
- Terry Connolly, 49, Australian judge of the ACT Supreme Court, heart attack.
- Kurt Julius Goldstein, 92, German journalist and Auschwitz survivor.
- André Gorz, 84, Austrian-born French social philosopher, suicide by lethal injection.
- Frank Hyde, 91, Australian rugby league player and commentator.
- Hiroshi Ōsaka, 44, Japanese co-founder of Bones Animation Studio, cancer.
- Pief Panofsky, 88, American physicist and former director of SLAC, heart attack.
- Frank Sherring, 93, Canadian politician, Mayor of Lethbridge, Alberta (1962–1968), cancer.
- Otto Špaček, 89, Czech World War II hero.
- Lenore Tawney, 100, American fiber artist.

=== 25 ===
- Haidar Abdel-Shafi, 88, Palestinian negotiator, stomach cancer.
- Hans Colberg, 95, Danish footballer and Olympian (1948).
- André Emmerich, 82, German-born American art dealer, complications from a stroke.
- Jana Krishnamurthi, 79, Indian politician, President of the Bharatiya Janata Party (2001–2007).
- Michael Wayne Richard, 48, American murderer, execution by lethal injection.
- Bill Waller, 95, American college football coach.

=== 26 ===
- Stanislav Andreski, 88, Polish sociologist.
- Robert Bruss, 67, American real estate attorney and columnist, cancer.
- Velma Wayne Dawson, 94, American creator of the Howdy Doody puppet.
- Roberto Dias, 64, Brazilian footballer and Olympian (1960).
- Erich Habitzl, 83, Austrian footballer and Olympian (1948).
- Angela Lambert, 67, British journalist, historian and novelist.
- Erik Hazelhoff Roelfzema, 90, Dutch secret agent, author and businessman.
- Randy Van Horne, 83, American singer of TV theme songs (The Flintstones, The Jetsons), cancer.
- Bill Wirtz, 77, American owner of the NHL's Chicago Blackhawks, cancer.

=== 27 ===
- Nenad Bogdanović, 53, Serbian politician, mayor of Belgrade (2004–2007), lymphoma.
- Dan Dilworth, 65, American Olympic ice hockey player (1964).
- Dale Houston, 67, American musician (Dale and Grace).
- Kenji Nagai, 50, Japanese video journalist, shot.
- Bill Perry, 77, South African-born English footballer, cancer.
- Marjatta Raita, 63, Finnish actress, cancer.
- George Rieveschl, 91, American inventor (Benadryl), pneumonia.
- Darcy Robinson, 26, Italian/Canadian professional ice hockey player, heart attack.
- Israel Segal, 63, Israeli writer and journalist, heart failure.
- Avraham Shapira, 93, Israeli rabbi, Ashkenazi chief rabbi of Israel (1983–1993).

=== 28 ===
- René Desmaison, 77, French mountaineer.
- Charles B. Griffith, 77, American screenwriter.
- Evelyn Knight, 89, American singer, lung cancer.
- Adam Kozłowiecki, 96, Polish-born Roman Catholic prelate, Archbishop of Lusaka (1955–1969).
- Peter Kuiper, 78, Dutch-born German actor.
- Martin Manulis, 92, American television and film producer, Emmy Award winner.
- Wally Parks, 94, American drag racing and hot rod pioneer, pneumonia.
- Derek Shackleton, 83, British cricketer (Hampshire and England).
- Hamid Shirzadegan, 66, Iranian footballer, lung cancer.

=== 29 ===
- Cyril Martin, 79, South African Olympic wrestler.
- Lois Maxwell, 80, Canadian actress (Dr. No, Goldfinger, A View to a Kill), colorectal cancer.
- Wolfgang Preisendanz, 87, German philologist and literary critic.
- Katsuko Saruhashi, 87, Japanese scientist, pneumonia.
- Gyula Zsivótzky, 70, Hungarian hammer thrower, 1968 Olympics gold medallist, cancer.

=== 30 ===
- Frederico Barrigana, 85, Portuguese footballer.
- Al Chang, 85, American two-time Pulitzer prize-nominated military photographer, leukemia.
- Cyril Eastlake, 77, New Zealand rugby league player (national team).
- Len Graham, 81, Northern Irish footballer.
- John Henebry, 89, American Air Force major general, heart failure.
- Milan Jelić, 51, Bosnian politician, president of Republika Srpska entity (2006–2007), heart attack.
- Khachatur Kyapanaktsyan, 39, Armenian weightlifter and Olympian (1996).
- Joe Mitty, 88, British founder of the Oxfam charity shop.
- C. F. D. Moule, 98, British theologian and priest.
- Eugene Saenger, 90, American radiologist and university professor.
- Oswald Mathias Ungers, 81, German architect, pneumonia.
