= Naima Samih =

Moroccan singer (1953–2025)

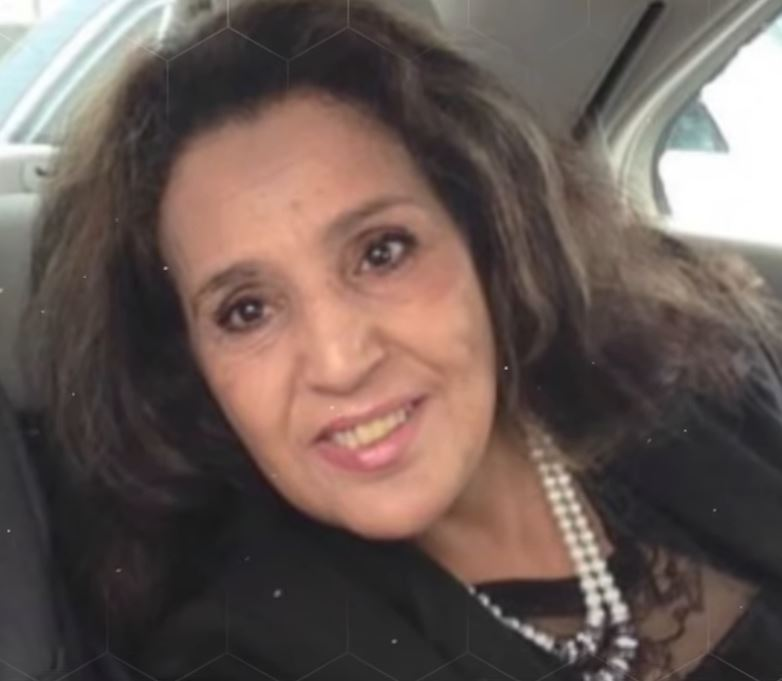
- Samih in 2019
- Born: 1953; Casablanca, Morocco
- Died: 8 March 2025 (aged 72); Rabat, Morocco
- Citizenship: Morocco
- Occupation: Singer
- Spouse: Mustapha Belkaid
- Children: 1

Naima Samih (Arabic: نعيمة سميح; 1953 – 8 March 2025) was a Moroccan singer. She is considered one of the most important voices in Moroccan music in the second half of the twentieth century. Her singing career began in the 1970s, and her songs gained wide popularity in Morocco, Algeria, Tunisia, and other Arab countries. She was even dubbed “The Lady of Tarab” and became the third and youngest Arab singer to perform at Olympia, after Umm Kulthum and Fairuz.

== Life and career ==
Born in a family of thirteen children in Casablanca, Samih started singing at the age of nine. She stopped attending school at an early age and worked with a seamstress to support her family but gave up taking a chance for music. In the early 1970s she got a breakthrough, taking part in the musical show Mawahib (a show that revealed Moroccan talents such as Samira Said and Rajae Belmlih). She became a star in the 1970s with the release of her song "Jrit Ou Jarit" also known as "Yaka Jarhi," which became a hit throughout the Arab world.

Unlike her fellow singers from Mawahib, who travelled to Egypt where voices from across the Arab world were welcomed to work with its leading composers and writers, Samih stayed in Morocco to pursue her career. Her Khaleeji song from Qatar, "Wagif Aala Babikom", was a huge success.

Samih died on 8 March 2025, at the age of 72.
