= 3rd Operations Group =

3rd Operations Group

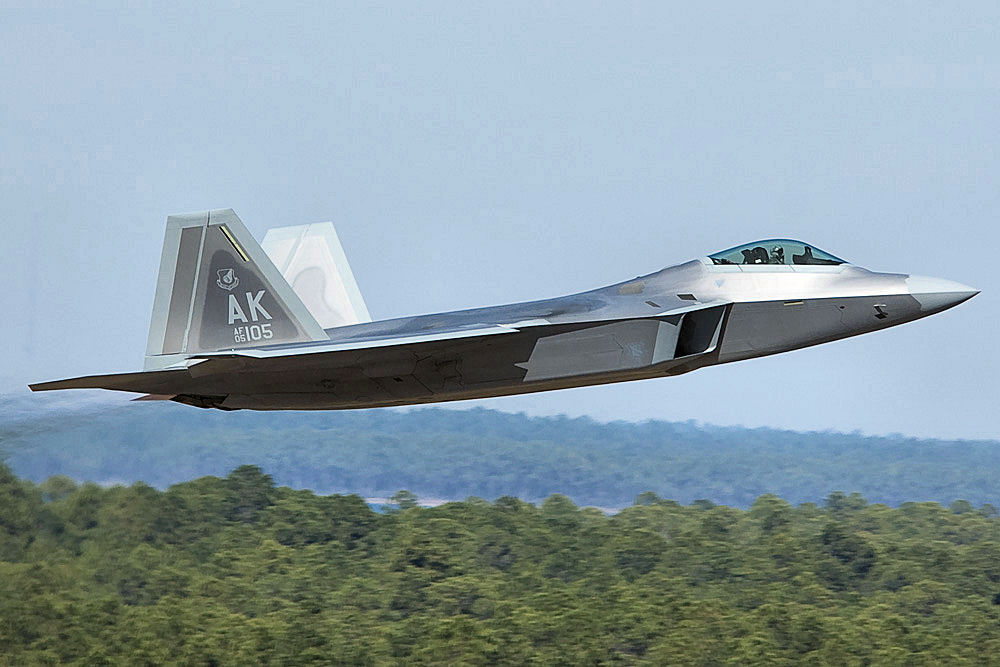
- 90th Fighter Squadron F-22A Raptor (Note: Aircraft is Lockheed Martin F-22A Block 30 Raptor, serial 05-4105.)
- Active: 1919–1957; 1991–present
- Country: United States
- Branch: United States Air Force
- Type: Operations Group
- Part of: Pacific Air Forces
- Garrison/HQ: Elmendorf AFB
- Motto: Non Solum Armis Latin Not by Arms Alone
- Engagements: World War II Antisubmarine, American Theater; World War II Asia-Pacific Theater; Korean War

- Decorations: Distinguished Unit Citation (5x); Air Force Outstanding Unit Award (5x); Philippines Presidential Unit Citation; Republic of Korea Presidential Unit Citation

Insignia
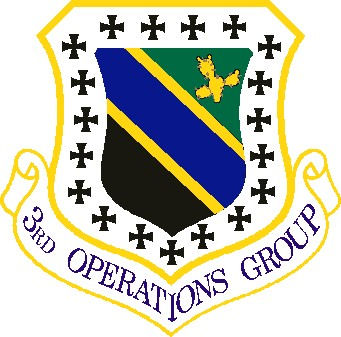
- 3rd Operations Group emblem (Note: The group uses the 3rd Wing emblem with the group designation on the scroll.)

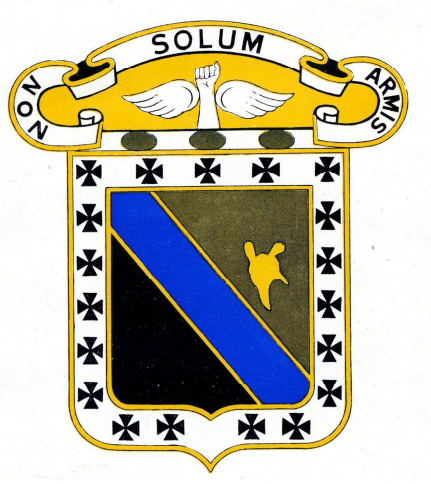
- 3rd Attack Group emblem (Note: Approved on 17 January 1922. The shield is described as: Party per bend vert and sable, in chief a cactus (prickly pear) or, a bend azure fimbriated of the third (color), all within a bordure argent charged with nineteen crosses pattée of the second (color). The original coat of arms also included a crest: On a wreath of the colors (green and yellow) an arm couped near the shoulder paleways (vertical) with hand clenched proper between two wings conjoined in lure argent. Maurer, Combat Units, p. 32)

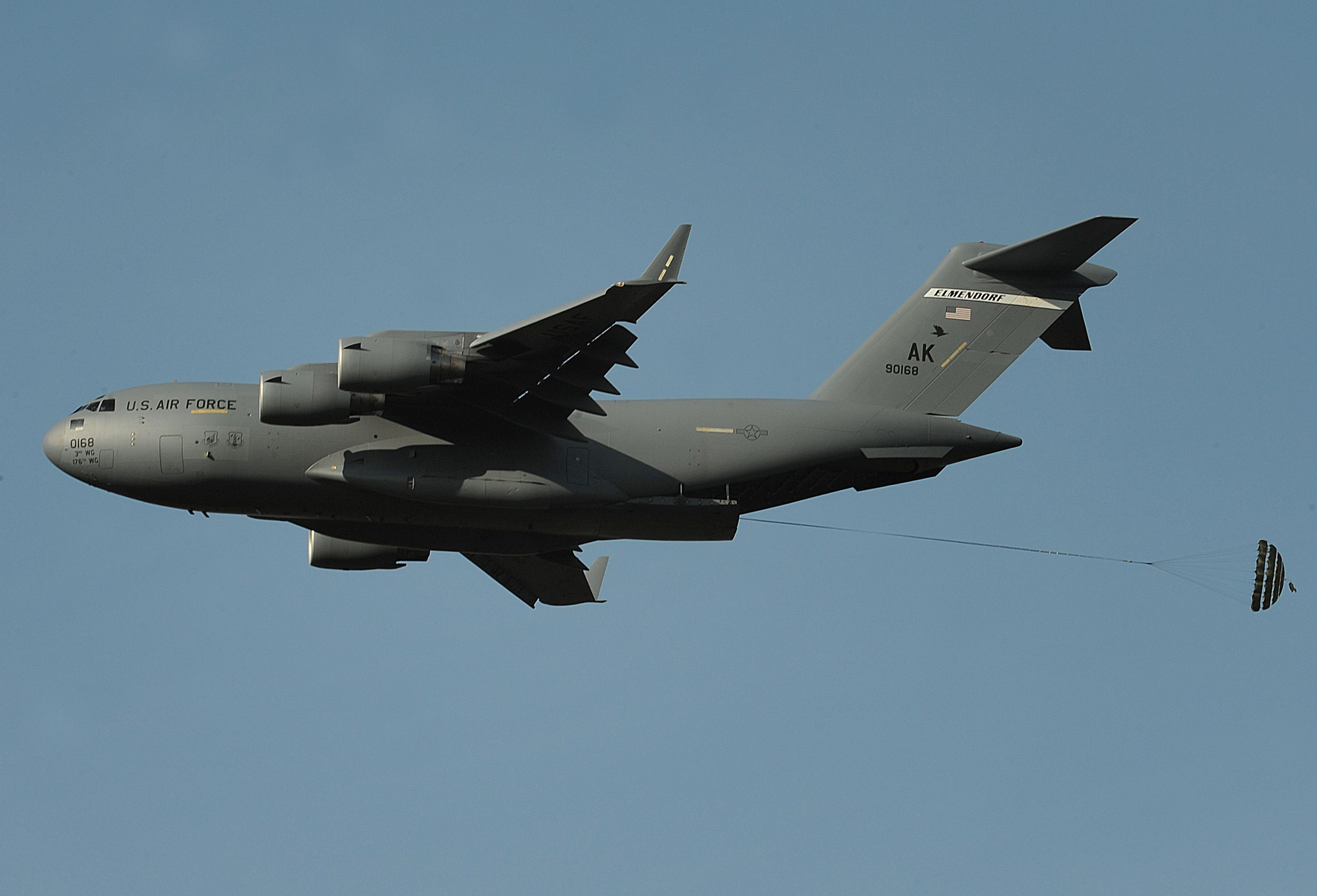
517th Airlift Squadron Boeing C-17A Lot XI Globemaster III 99-0168

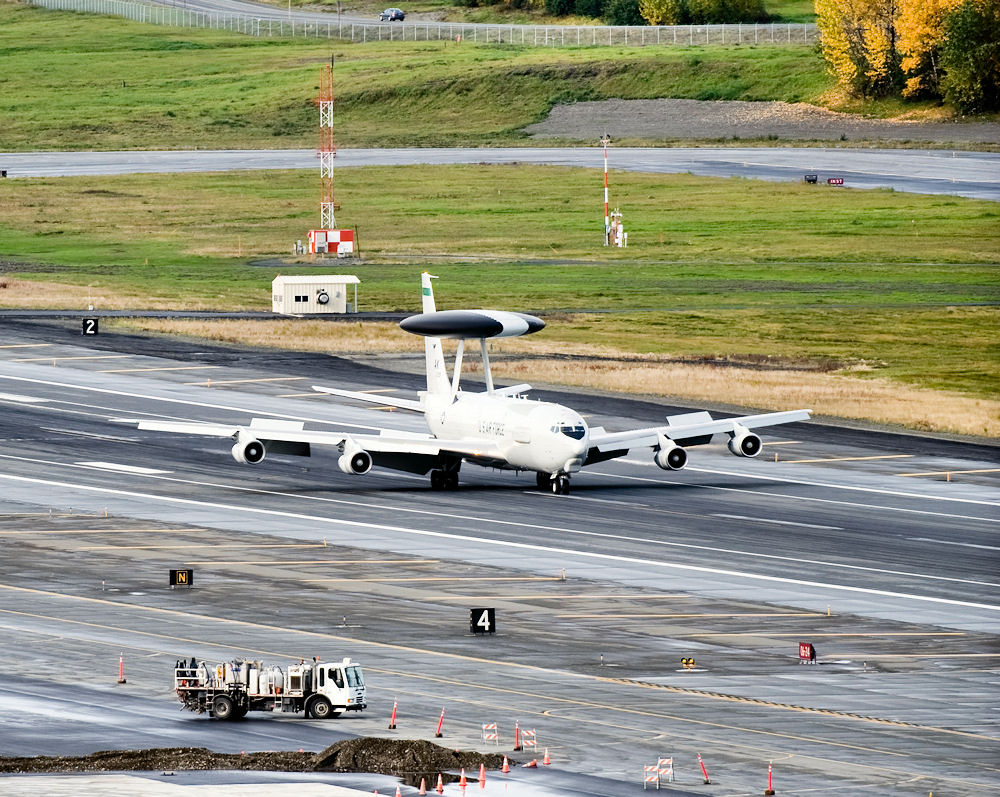
962nd Airborne Air Control Squadron E-3B

The 3rd Operations Group is the operational flying component of the United States Air Force 3rd Wing. It is stationed at Joint Base Elmendorf–Richardson, Alaska, and is assigned to Pacific Air Forces' Eleventh Air Force.

The group is a composite organization that provides air superiority and defense for Alaska flying F-22A Raptor stealth aircraft. In addition, the group supports Pacific Air Forces in the Pacific Command area of responsibility flying C-17 Globemaster III transports and E-3B sentry airborne early warning and control (AWACS) aircraft.

The group is a direct successor organization of the 3rd Attack Group, one of the 15 original combat air groups formed by the Army before World War II. It is the oldest active group in the USAF, and the first created after the establishment of the U.S. Air Service. Based in Texas after World War I, the group patrolled the Mexican Border from Brownsville, Texas, to Nogales, Arizona. The group pioneered dive bombing, skip-bombing, and parafrag attacks in the 1920s—the earliest forms of precision guided attack from aircraft—and put this work to good use in World War II.

The World War II 3rd Bombardment Group moved to Australia early in 1942 and served primarily in the Southwest Pacific Theater as a light bombardment group assigned to Fifth Air Force. The group participated in numerous campaigns during the war, engaging in combat over Japan; Netherlands East Indies; New Guinea; Bismarck Archipelago; Western Pacific; Leyte; Luzon and the Southern Philippines. On 2 November 1943, the group encountered heavy opposition from Japanese forces at Simpson Harbor, New Britain. In that attack Major Raymond H. Wilkins, commander of the 8th Bombardment Squadron, sank two ships before he was shot down as he deliberately drew the fire of a destroyer so that other planes of his squadron could withdraw safely-an action for which Maj Wilkins was posthumously awarded the Medal of Honor.

The 3rd again served in combat during the Korean War, using B-26 Invader light bombers. Captain John S. Walmsley Jr. was posthumously awarded the Medal of Honor for his actions a night mission. Capt Walmsley discovered and attacked an enemy supply train, and after exhausting his ammunition he flew at low altitude to direct other aircraft to the same objective; the train was destroyed but Walmsley's plane crashed in the target area.

Notable alumni include General Hoyt S. Vandenberg, General Jimmy Doolittle, General Lewis Brereton, General Richard Ellis, General John Henebry, Major Paul I. "Pappy" Gunn, and General Nathan Twining.

== Overview ==
The 3 OG Mobilizes, deploys, and employs three different squadrons of F-15C/D, F-22, C-17, 2 E-3Bs, and C-12Fs aircraft worldwide to accomplish air superiority, air battle management, air interdiction, counter narcotics, airlift, and air daily air sovereignty missions to achieve dominant maneuver, precision engagement, and information superiority in support of CJCS, PACOM, CENTCOM, SOUTHCOM, and NORAD operations.

Assigned squadrons are:

- 3rd Operations Support Squadron
- 90th Fighter Squadron
- 517th Airlift Squadron
- 525th Fighter Squadron
- 962nd Airborne Air Control Squadron

== History ==
For additional lineage and history, see 3rd Wing
See United States Army Air Service Mexican Border Patrol

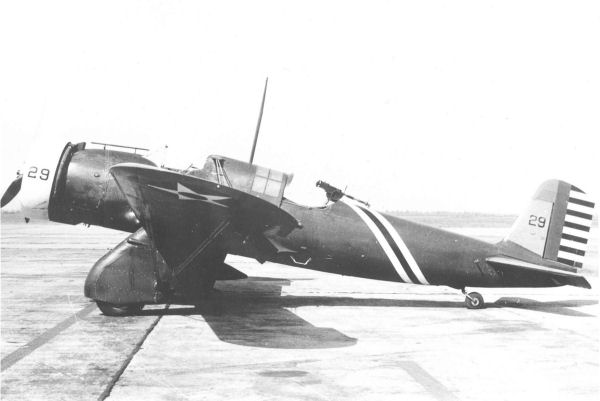
Curtiss A-12 Shrike Serial 33-229 of the 13th Attack Squadron.

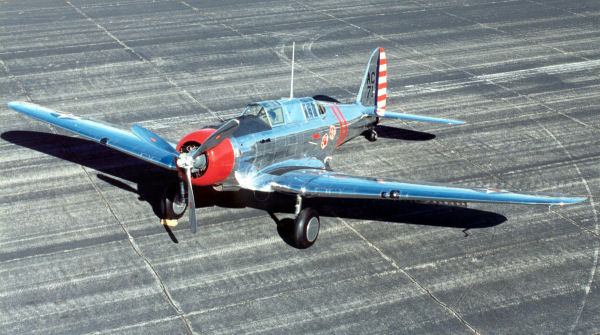
Northrup A-17A Serial 36–207 at the National Museum of the United States Air Force. It was assigned to the 90th Attack Squadron (1937–40). It is the only A-17A known to exist.

The 3rd Group and its successor units have served the United States on a continuing basis since the group's activation as the Army Surveillance Group on 1 July 1919. (Note: The 8th Aero Squadron was organized on 21 June 1917; the 13th on 14 June 1917, and the 90th on 20 August 1917 by the Aviation Section, U.S. Signal Corps. These squadrons served in combat during World War I prior to their assignment to the 3rd.) In August 1919 the Air Service organized its first seven groups and it became the 1st Surveillance Group. Initially the group used Airco DH-4B's to patrol the border from Brownsville, Texas, to Nogales, Arizona, as revolution and disorder had broken out in Mexico, resulting in border violations and the killing of American citizens.

In a functional redesignation of Air Service groups, the unit was redesignated as the 3rd Attack Group in 1921. It participated in maneuvers, tested new equipment, experimented with tactics, flew in aerial reviews, patrolled the United States–Mexico border (1929), and carried Airmail (1934) flying a wide variety of biplanes (DH-4, XB-1A, GA-1, A-3).

On 1 March 1935, the Army Air Corps formed the first centralized control of its combat striking units within the United States under the General Headquarter Air Force. The 3rd Attack Group moved to Barksdale Field, Louisiana, as part of the 3rd Wing commanded by Col. Gerald Brant, together with the 20th Pursuit Group. Aircraft assigned to the 3rd Attack Group were the Curtiss A-12 Shrike in 1935 and the Northrup A-17/A-17A Nomad in 1937.

The commander of the 3rd Attack Group, Lt. Col. Horace Meek Hickam, was killed on 5 November 1934, when the A-12 he was piloting (33–250) crashed while landing at Fort Crockett, Texas. Hickam Field was named in his honor. Some A-12s were still at Hickam Field on 7 December 1941, when the Japanese attacked, however, none of the aircraft saw any combat. The A-12 was withdrawn from service soon after.

The A-17s were fairly fast and had a fairly heavy forward-firing armament for its time, and during 1938–39 war games it was deemed to be the most effective ground attack aircraft yet devised. However the career of the A-17 with the Army was quite brief. After only three years of service with the Army, the A-17As were declared surplus. In 1940, the unit was redesignated as the 3rd Bombardment Group (Light), being reequipped with the Douglas B-18 Bolo and B-12 bombers and moved to Army Air Base, Savannah, Georgia.

=== World War II ===
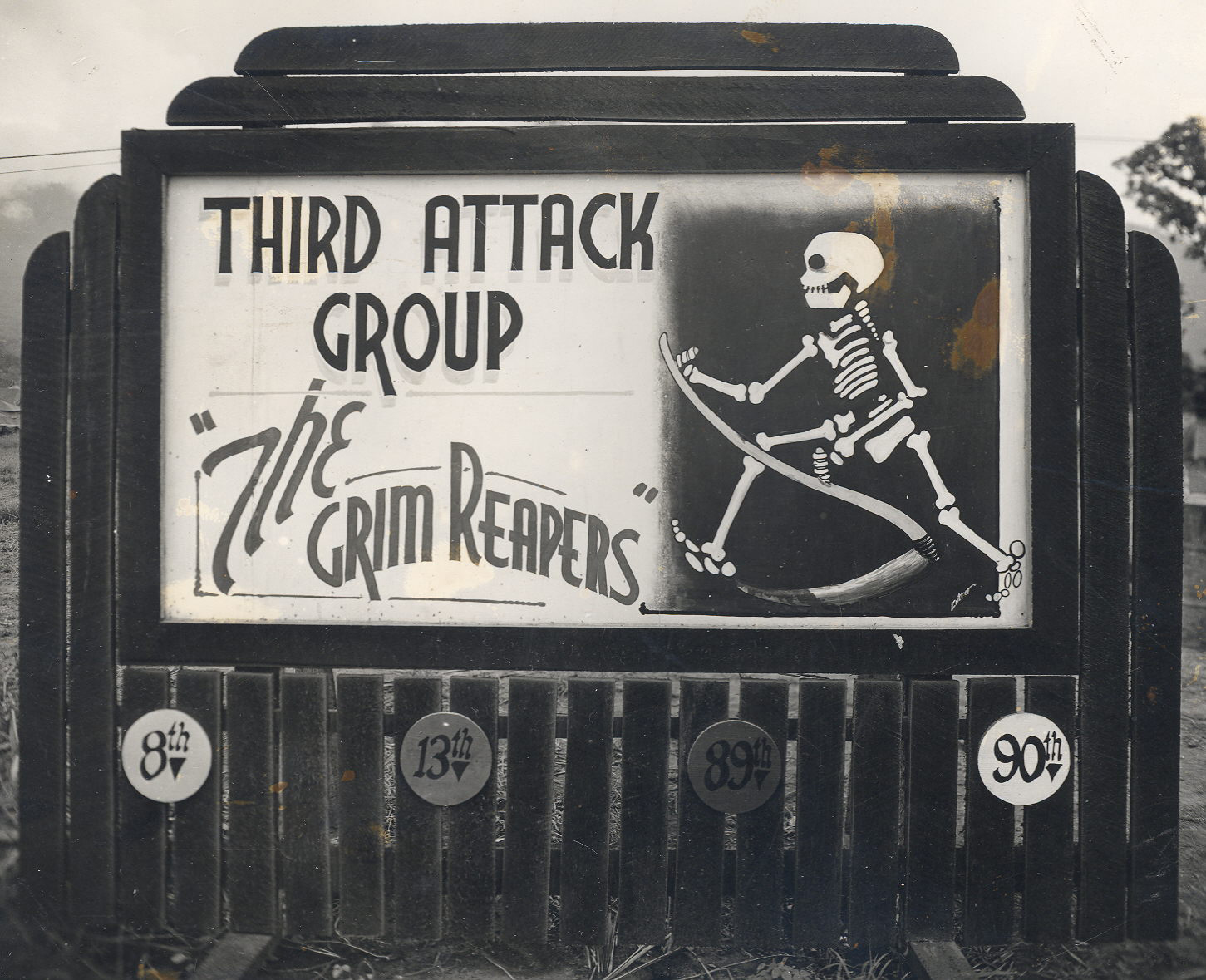
3rd Attack Group sign

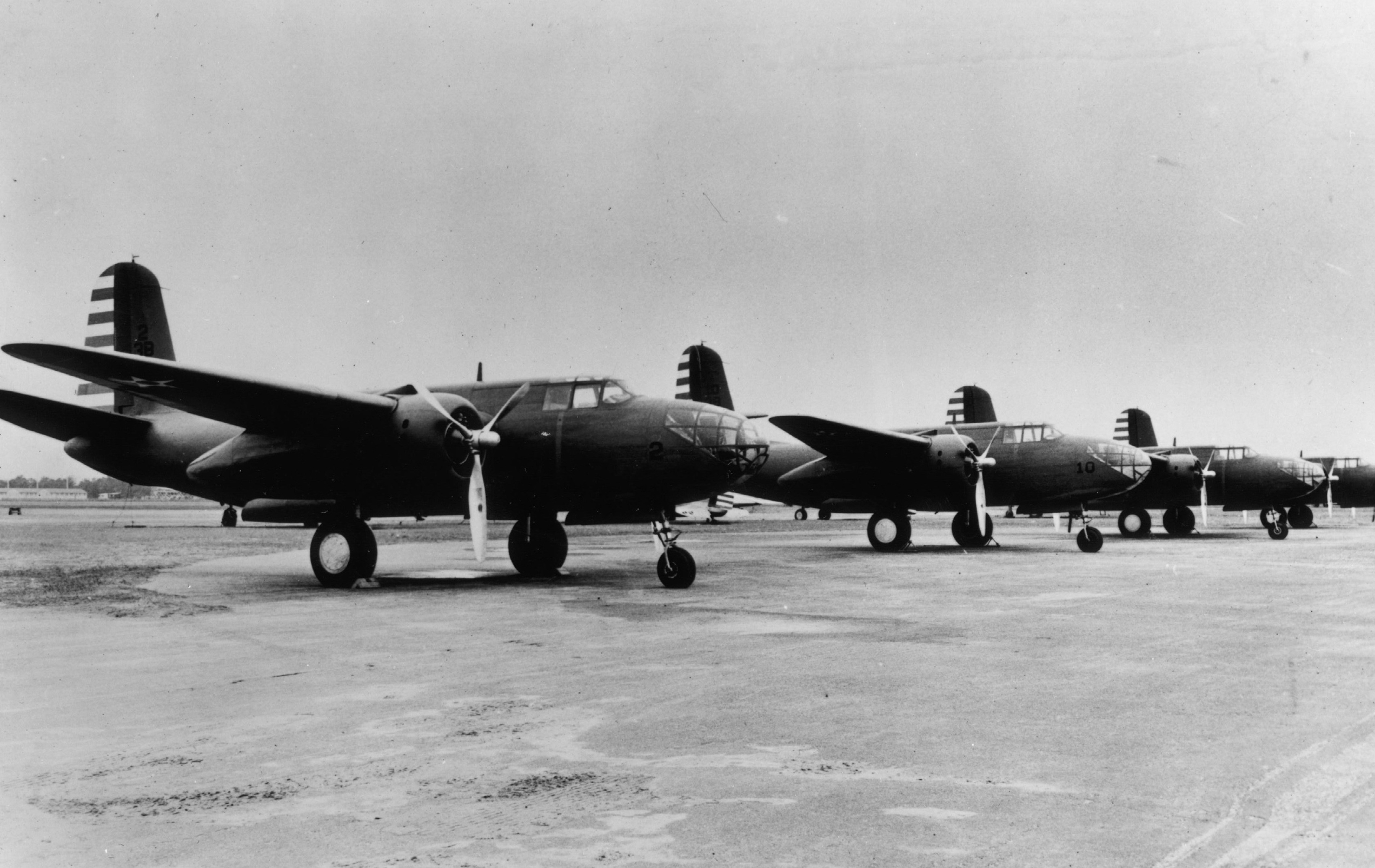
A-20 aircraft of the 89th Bomb Squadron

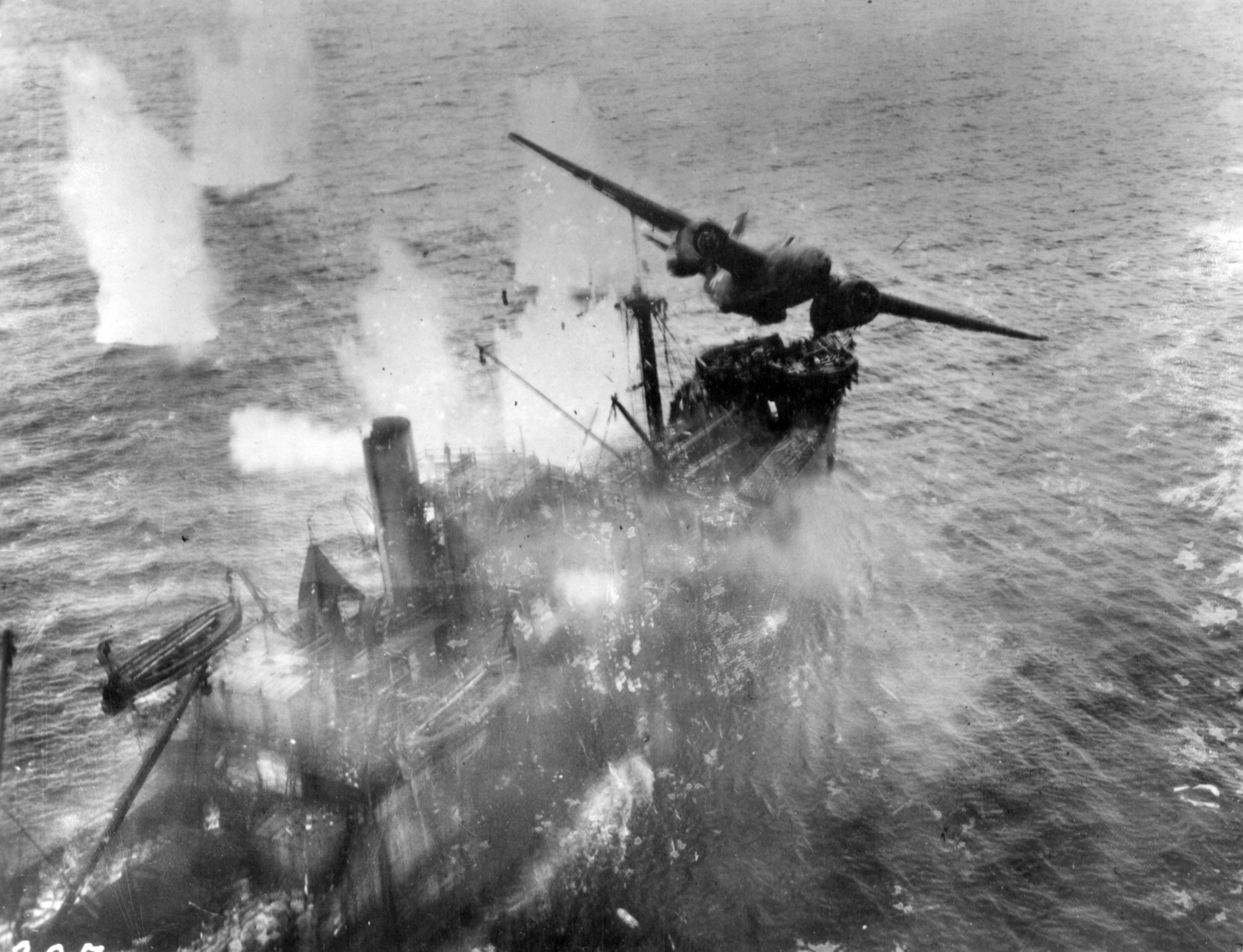
U.S. A-20 Havoc of the 89th Squadron, 3rd Attack Group, at the moment it clears a Japanese merchant ship following a successful skip bombing attack. Wewak, New Guinea, March 1944

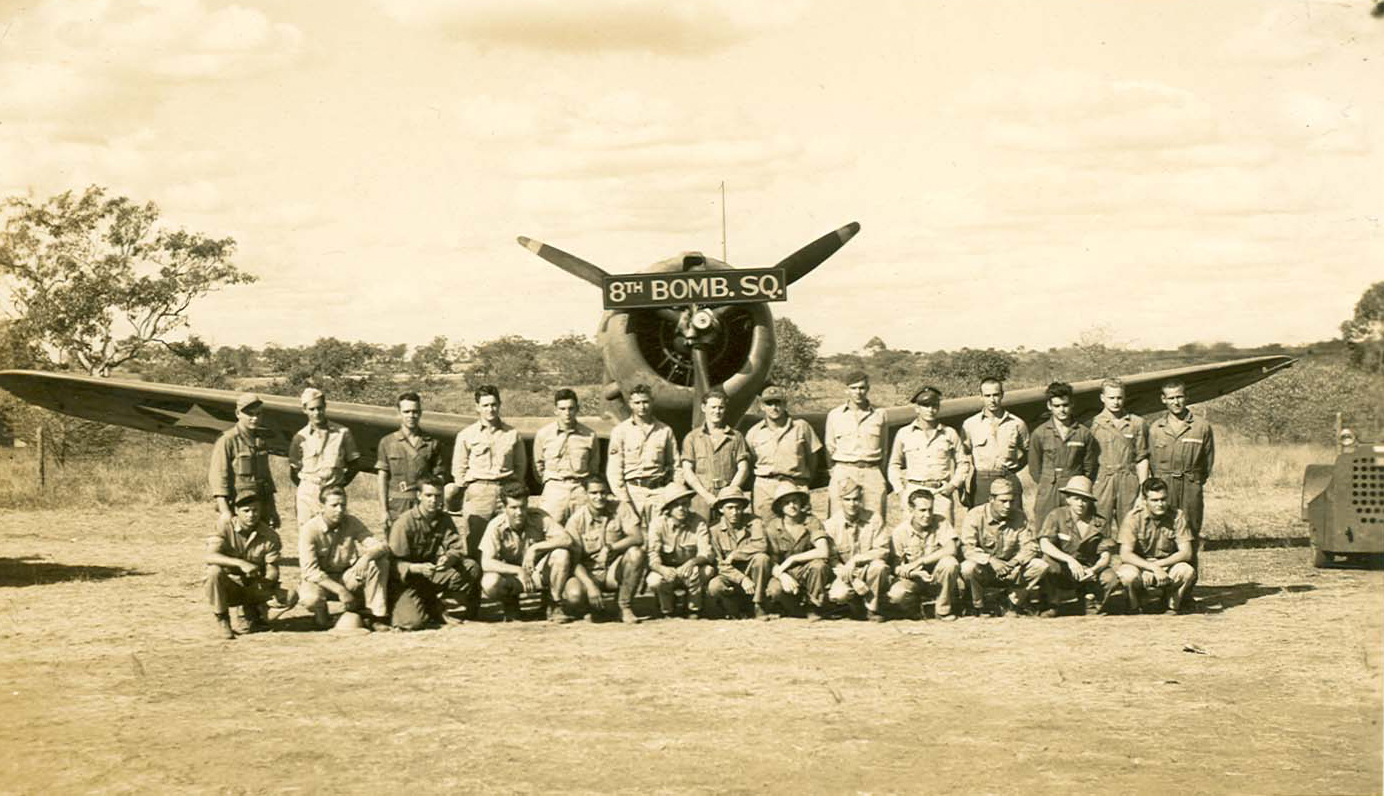
8th Bomb squadron personnel posing in front of a A-24

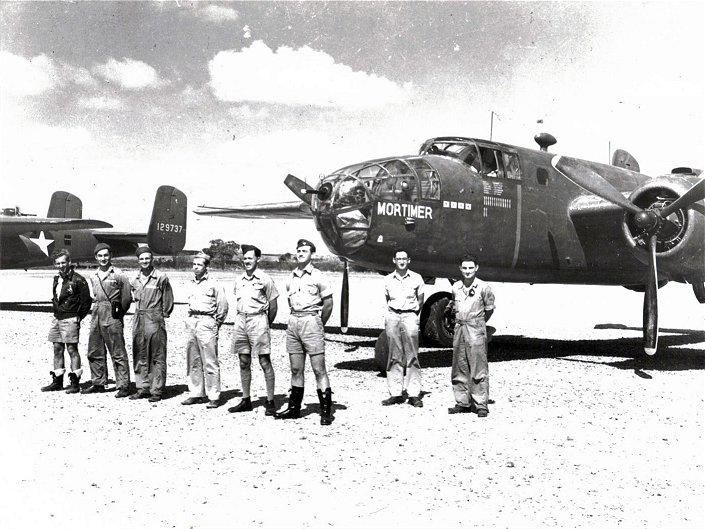
B-25 and crew from the 3rd Bomb Group

The 3rd Group served in combat in the South West Pacific Area from 1 April 1942 until it reached the Philippines, and continued on operations against Japan until the end of the war. It was transferred to Australia early in 1942 as part of the United States Army Forces in Australia under Gen. George H. Brett and later the Fifth Air Force under Gen. George C. Kenney.

On 2 April 1942, Lt. Col. John H. Davies was appointed to command the group, which had been shipped overseas under command of a first lieutenant and without aircraft. Davies had been in command of the 27th Bomb Group in the Philippines when war broke out, then had become stranded in Australia with 22 of his pilots after attempting to ferry the A-24 dive bombers being shipped to the 27th. These provided a leadership cadre and air crews for the 3rd Group. Their first aircraft acquired were 15 B-25 Mitchells, newly assembled but without crews, which had been shipped to Australia for the Royal Netherlands East Indies Army Air Force (ML-KNIL). With these the group conducted the first bombing mission ever flown by B-25s, sending six bombers to Gasmata, New Britain, on 6 April. Ten staged through Darwin to Mindanao on 10 April, flying two days of sorties against Cebu City and Davao on 12 and 13 April, before returning with passengers being evacuated from the Philippines.

While officially designated the 3rd Bombardment Group (Light), the group unofficially styled itself with its historic name, the "3rd Attack Group," after being equipped with low-altitude strafing bombers. Field-modified with .50 caliber machine guns taken from wrecked fighters, these strafing bombers were the brainchild of a former naval aviator serving in the USAAF, Paul "Pappy" Gunn, the 13th and 90th Squadrons were equipped with its "Dutch" B-25s field modified into the B-25C-1 strafer configuration. The 89th Squadron flew the Douglas A-20A Havoc attack bomber while the 8th Squadron used the Douglas A-24 dive bomber until 29 July 1942, but also used the B-25 and A-20.

The group had its headquarters in Australia until January 1943, but its squadrons operated from forward locations in New Guinea, bombing and strafing enemy airfields, supply lines, installations, and shipping as the Allies halted the Japanese drive toward Port Moresby and drove the enemy back from Buna to Lae. At the end of that campaign, group headquarters moved to New Guinea.

For the next year and a half the group continued to serve in the Southwest Pacific, where it played an important role in the offensives in which the Allies pushed along the northern coast of New Guinea, taking Salamaua, Lae, Hollandia, Wakde, Biak, and Noemfoor. In March 1943 it took part in the Battle of the Bismarck Sea, which ended Japanese attempts to send convoys to Lae. In August 1943, when Fifth Air Force struck airfields at Wewak to neutralize Japanese airpower that threatened the advance of Allied forces in New Guinea, the group made an attack in the face of intense antiaircraft fire on 17 August, destroyed or damaged many enemy planes, and won a Distinguished Unit Citation for the mission.

In the fall of 1943 the group struck Japanese naval and air power at Rabaul to support the assaults on Bougainville and New Britain. In an attack on shipping at Simpson Harbor, New Britain, on 2 November 1943, the 3rd Group encountered heavy opposition from enemy fighters and from antiaircraft batteries on the ships. In that attack Major Raymond H. Wilkins, commander of the 8th Squadron, sank two ships before he was shot down as he deliberately drew the fire of a destroyer so that other planes of his squadron could withdraw safely – an action for which Maj Wilkins was posthumously awarded the Medal of Honor.

The group moved to the Philippines late in 1944. Equipped with A-20s, it bombed and strafed airfields; supported ground forces on Mindoro, Luzon, and Mindanao; attacked industries and railways on Formosa; and struck shipping along the China coast.

The group moved to Okinawa early in August 1945 and flew some missions to Japan before the war ended. Moved to Japan in September 1945 and, as part of U.S. Far East Air Forces, became part of the army of occupation.

=== Korean War ===
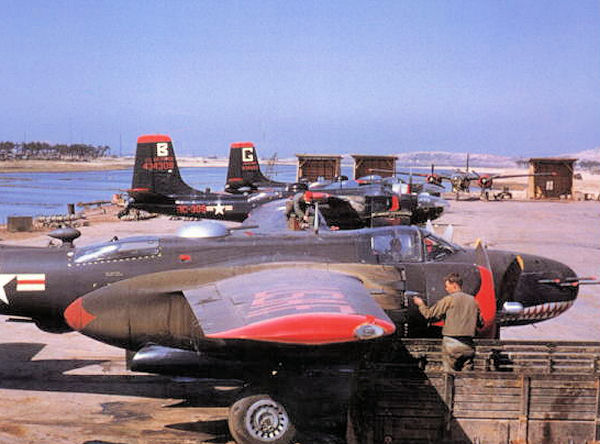
3rd Bomb Wing B-26B-50-DL Invaders during the Korean War. Serial 44-34306 identifiable.

Flying Douglas A-26 Invaders (after 1948, the B-26) the 3rd Wing participated from the first bombing sortie to the last during the Korean War. The first Americans to die during the Korean War, 1Lt. Remer L. Harding and SSgt. William Goodwin, were assigned to the 13th Bombardment Squadron when they died 28 June 1950 returning from a sortie on the Korean Peninsula. Captain John S. Walmsley Jr. was posthumously awarded the Medal of Honor for his actions on 14 September 1951: flying a night mission in a B-26, Capt Walmsley discovered and attacked an enemy supply train, and after exhausting his ammunition he flew at low altitude to direct other aircraft to the same objective; the train was destroyed but Walmsley's plane crashed in the target area.

In recognition of the wing's distinguished service, the 3rd Bombardment Wing's was granted the privilege of conducting the last bombing mission over North Korea minutes before implementation of the ceasefire of 27 July 1953.

=== Cold War ===
With the war over in Korea, wing returned to the routine of peacetime duty in the Cold War environment. It remained at Kunsan Air Base until October 1954, when it moved to Johnson Air Base, Japan. Beginning in January 1956, the 3rd Bombardment Group converted from the B-26 to the Martin B-57B Canberra Night Intruder. By August 1956, the Group had become a paper unit, with only one officer and one airman assigned for record purposes. Its squadrons were attached to the 3rd Bombardment Wing, which had assumed its duties. On 25 October 1957, those squadrons were transferred to the wing and the group inactivated.

=== Post Cold War era ===
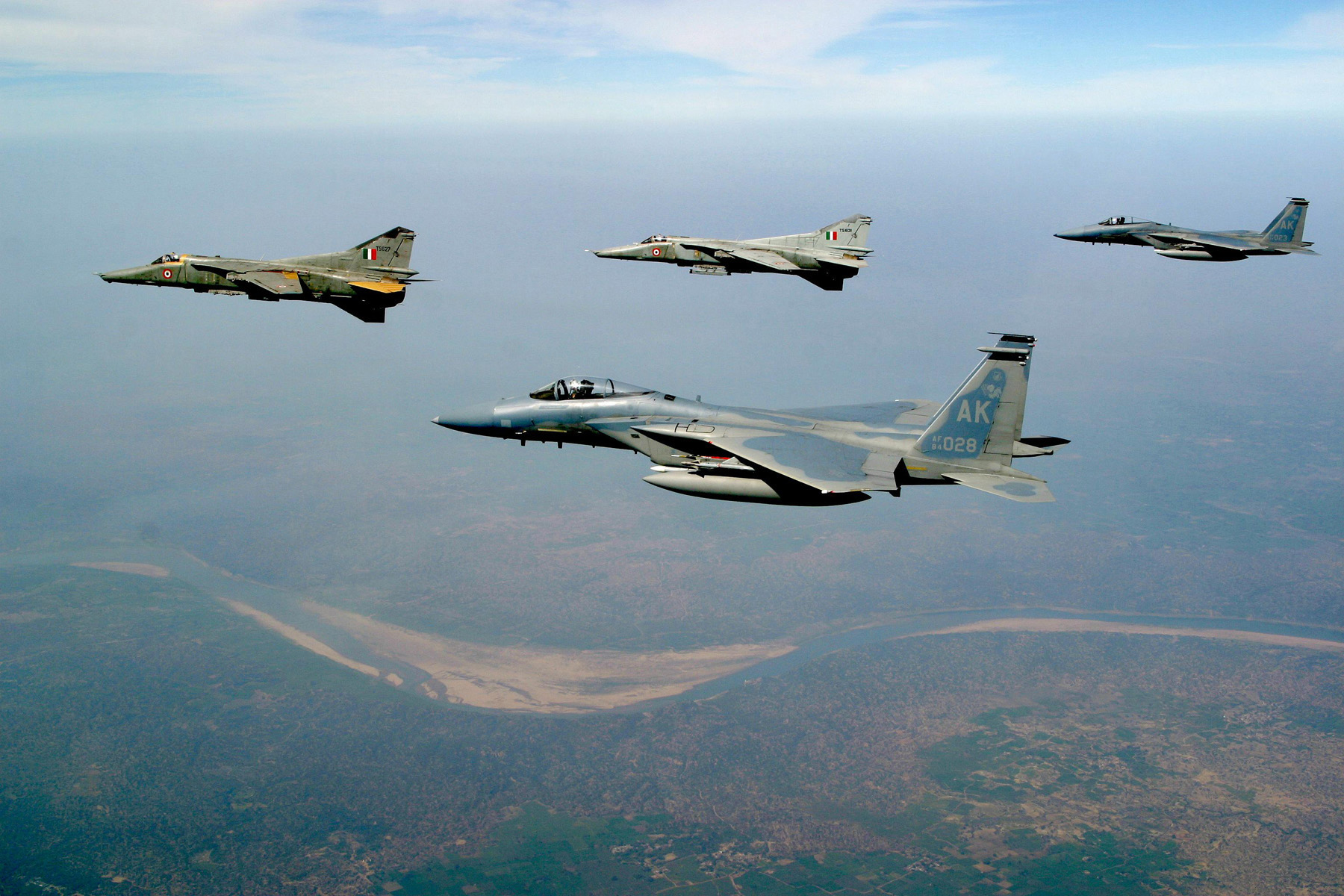
Two F-15 Eagles from Elmendorf Air Force Base, Alaska, and two Indian air force MIG-27 Floggers fly together during Cope India '04

In 1991, activated in Alaska after 34 years on the inactive list, and expanded the air defense mission of the 3rd Wing, to include deep interdiction and air-to-air capabilities with the F-15E aircraft. Added an airlift capability in April 1992, using C-130 and C-12 aircraft, providing worldwide combat airdrop, tactical airland, operational support airlift, airlift for theater deployed forces, and resupply of remote Alaskan long-range radar sites. Again expanded its mission in 1993 when it gained E-3B/J aircraft for long-range airborne surveillance, detection, identification, and command and control.

Since 1993, mobilized, deployed and employed flying squadrons worldwide to accomplish air superiority, air battle management, air interdiction, counter narcotics, airlift and air sovereignty in support of 3 Wing mission.

== Lineage ==
- Organized as the Army Surveillance Group on 1 July 1919 (Note: The four squadrons assigned to the Army Surveillance Group (8th, 12th 13th and 90th) upon the group's activation all predate the formation of the group; having been formed in 1917 as a result of the United States' entry into World War I. All were deployed to France and fought on the Western Front; their combat being reflected in the group's emblem.)

Redesignated 1st Surveillance Group on 15 August 1919
Redesignated 3rd Group (Attack) on 15 September 1921
Redesignated 3rd Attack Group on 25 January 1923
Redesignated 3rd Bombardment Group (Light) on 15 September 1939
Redesignated 3rd Bombardment Group (Dive) on 28 September 1942
Redesignated 3rd Bombardment Group (Light) on 25 May 1943
Redesignated 3rd Bombardment Group, Light on 14 February 1944
Redesignated 3rd Bombardment Group, Tactical on 1 October 1955
Inactivated on 25 October 1957

- Redesignated 3rd Tactical Fighter Group on 31 July 1985 (Remained inactive)
- Redesignated 3rd Operations Group on 1 December 1991

Activated on 19 December 1991

=== Assignments ===
- Unknown, 1 July 1919 (attached to 1st Wing (Provisional), 1 July 1922 - unknown) (Note: However, both Maurer and Clay in their entries for the 1st Bombardment Wing indicate that the group was a component of the wing from 1919 until 1929. Maurer, Combat Units, p. 373, Clay, p. 1242)
- First Army, c. October 1921
- 3rd Attack Wing, c. 8 May 1929 - unknown (Note: Clay indicates this assignment occurred in 1922. Clay, p. 1297. However, both Clay and Maurer indicate that the 3rd Attack Wing was not activated until 1932. Clay, p. 1242; Maurer, Combat Units, pp. 413-414)
- 3rd Wing, 1 March 1935
- 17th Bombardment Wing, 16 January 1941
- III Air Support Command, 1 September 1941
- III Bomber Command, 8 December 1941
- III Air Support Command, 2 January 1942
- United States Army Forces in Australia, February 1942
- Allied Air Forces, Southwest Pacific Area, 18 April 1942
- V Bomber Command, 5 September 1942 (attached to 310th Bombardment Wing, 1 May 1944 – September 1944, after 15 January 1945)
- 314th Composite Wing, 31 May 1946
- 3rd Bombardment Wing, 18 August 1948 – 25 October 1957 (attached to Fifth Air Force, 20 July 1950, 6133rd Bombardment Wing (later 6133 Tactical Support Wing), 25 August-30 November 1950)
- 3rd Wing, 19 December 1991 – present

=== Operational Components ===
Groups

- 71st Reconnaissance Group: attached 31 October 1947 – 18 August 1948

Aero Squadrons

- 8th Aero Squadron (later 8th Squadron, 8th Attack Squadron, 8th Bombardment Squadron): 1 July 1919 – 25 October 1957 (detached after 13 August 1956)
- 12th Aero Squadron (later 12th Squadron): attached 13 October 1919 – 23 March 1920, assigned 24 March 1920 – 27 June 1921
- 13th Aero Squadron (later 13th Squadron, 13th Attack Squadron, 13th Bombardment Squadron: 1 July 1919 – 27 June 1924; 1 November 1929 - 25 October 1957 (not operational 1 January-27 March 1946, detached after 13 August 1956)
- 26th Aero Squadron (later 26th Attack Squadron): 15 September 1921 – 27 June 1924
- 90th Aero Squadron (later 90th Attack Squadron, 90th Bombardment Squadron, 90th Fighter Squadron): 1 July 1919 – 1 October 1949; 25 June 1951 – 25 October 1957 (not operational 1 February-3 April 1946; detached after 13 August 1956); 19 December 1991 – present
- 96th Aero Squadron: attached 12 November 1919 – 10 January 1921

Reconnaissance Squadrons

- 9th Reconnaissance Squadron, Very Long Range, Photographic: attached 25 September 1946 – 22 April 1947
- 10th Reconnaissance Squadron (later, 89th Bombardment Squadron): 15 January 1941 – 10 April 1946 (not operational after c. 1 January 1946)
- 82nd Reconnaissance Squadron: attached 1 February-c. 31 October 1947

Squadrons

- 6th Night Fighter Squadron: attached 7 September 1946 – 31 January 1947
- 12th Fighter Squadron: 28 April 2000 – 2007
- 19th Fighter Squadron: 1 January 1994 – 2010
- 43rd Fighter Squadron: 19 December 1991 – 1 January 1994
- 51st Attack Squadron: January 1935 -1 September 1936
- 54th Fighter Squadron: 19 December 1991 – 28 April 2000
- 90th Fighter Squadron: 1994–present
- 517th Airlift Squadron: 1 April 1992 – Present
- 525th Fighter Squadron: 30 September 2007–Present
- 537th Airlift Squadron: 29 Apr 2011-11 Sep 2013
- 731st Bombardment Squadron: attached November 1950-25 June 1951
- 962nd Airborne Warning and Control (later, 962nd Airborne Air Control Squadron): 1 May 1993 – present

=== Stations ===
- Kelly Field, Texas, 1 July 1919
- Fort Bliss, Texas, 12 November 1919
- Kelly Field, Texas, 2 July 1921
- Fort Crockett, Texas, 1 July 1926
- Barksdale Field, Louisiana, 28 February 1935
- Army Air Base, Savannah (later Hunter Field), Georgia, 6 October 1940 – 19 January 1942
- Archerfield Airport, Queensland, Australia, 25 February 1942
- Charters Towers Airfield, Queensland, Australia, 10 March 1942
- Port Moresby Airfield Complex, Papua New Guinea, 28 January 1943
- Dobodura Airfield Complex, Papua New Guinea, 20 May 1943
- Nadzab Airfield Complex, Papua New Guinea, 3 February 1944
- Hollandia Airfield Complex, Net herlands East Indies, 12 May 1944
- Dulag Airfield, Leyte, Philippines, 16 November 1944
- McGuire Field, Mindoro, Philippines, c. 30 December 1944
- Kadena Airfield, Okinawa, 6 August 1945
- Atsugi Airfield, Japan, c. 8 September 1945
- Yokota Airfield, Japan, 1 September 1946
- Johnson Air Base, Japan, c. 15 March 1950
- Iwakuni Air Base, Japan, 1 July 1950
- Kunsan Air Base (K-8), South Korea, 22 August 1951
- Johnson Air Base, Japan, c. 5 October 1954 – 25 October 1957
- Elmendorf Air Force Base, Alaska, 19 December 1991 – present

=== Aircraft operated ===
- DH-4, 1919–1926, 1926–1932
- JN-6, 1919–1921
- JNS-1, 1919–1921
- C-1, 1919–1921
- GAX / GA-1, 1921–1923
- XB-1A, 1921–1923
- O-2, 1921–1928
- O-1, 1927
- O-6, 1928-unknown
- A-3, 1928–1934
- A-8, 1932–1936
- O-19, 1932–1936
- A-12, 1933–1936
- A-17, 1936–1940
- In addition, flew XO-6 and Y-8 in the late 1920s, and JN-4, A-9, A-10
- Lockheed Hudson, O-24, AT-8, PT-26, and BT-14 in the period prior to World War II
- A (later, B)-18, 1937–1941
- B-12, 1939–1941
- A-20, 1941–1945
- A-24, 1941, 1942
- B-25, 1942–1944, 1945
- B-24, 1944–1946
- A (later, B)-26, 1945–1956
- F-2, 1946–1947
- P-51/F-6, 1946–1947
- F-7, 1946–1947
- F-9, 1946–1947
- F-13, 1946–1947
- B-17, 1946–1947
- P-61, 1946–1947
- RB-17, 1947–1948
- RB-29, 1947–1948
- RF-51, 1947–1948
- RF-61, 1947–1948
- RF-80, 1947–1948
- F-15 (modified P-61), 1949
- B-57, 1956
- F-4, 1991
- F-15, 1991–2008
- C-130, 1992–2008, 2011–2013
- C-12, 1992–2008
- E-3, 1993–present
- C-17, 2008–present
- F-22A 2008–present

== See also ==
- United States Army Air Forces in Australia
