= Bruss =

Bruss may refer to:

- Brös an alternate spelling of a preparation of cheese and grappa
- Franz Thomas Bruss, a Belgian-German professor of mathematics at the Université Libre de Bruxelles
- Logan Bruss (born 1999), American football player
- Robert Bruss, a real estate attorney and syndicated columnist known as "the Dear Abby of real estate"
- Arthur Atkinson aka Arthur "Artie" 'Bruss' Atkinson, an English former professional rugby league footballer
