= Raymond H. Wilkins =

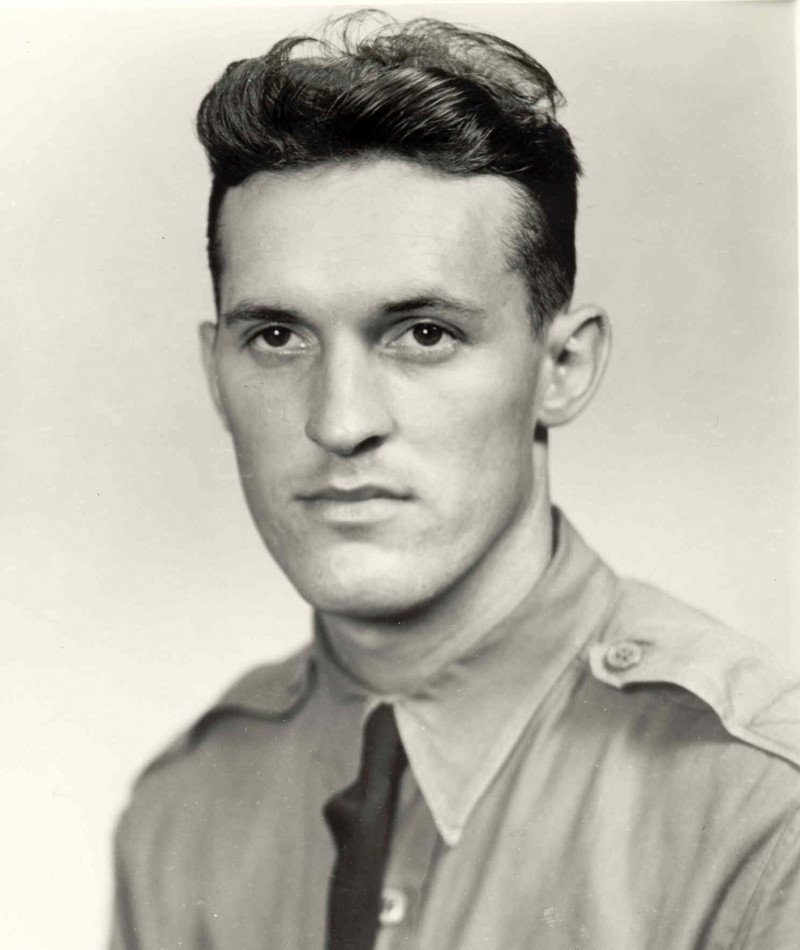
- Born: September 28, 1917; Portsmouth, Virginia, US
- Died: November 2, 1943 (aged 26) near Rabaul, New Britain
- Burial place: Olive Branch Cemetery Portsmouth, Virginia
- Military career
- Allegiance: United States of America
- Branch: United States Army Air Corps
- Service years: 1936 - 1943
- Rank: Major
- Commands: 8th Bombardment Squadron (Light), United States Army Air Corps
- Conflicts: World War II: Pacific War; New Guinea campaign †
- Awards: Medal of Honor; Silver Star; Distinguished Flying Cross (4); Purple Heart; Air Medal (2)

Raymond Harrell Wilkins (September 28, 1917 – November 2, 1943) was a United States Army Air Forces officer and posthumous recipient of the United States military's highest decoration—the Medal of Honor—for his actions in World War II.

== Biography ==
Wilkins was born in Portsmouth, Virginia to William Samuel and Florida Alverta Harrell Wilkins of Columbia, North Carolina. The family returned to Columbia when Wilkins was two years old. Wilkins grew up in Columbia and attended school there, graduating from high school in 1934. Wilkins entered the University of North Carolina in September, 1934. He was registered as a pharmacy major, with the intent of going to medical school.

== Military career and death ==
In 1936 Wilkins left UNC and enlisted as a private in the United States Army Air Corps. Serving at Langley Field, Virginia, Wilkins rose to the rank of staff sergeant.

He entered the Cadet Training Corps at Smith Air College, St. Louis before being transferred to Kelly Field, Texas, where he served as a Cadet Corps captain. Wilkins received his pilot's wings on October 31, 1941 and was commissioned a second lieutenant. After serving as an instructor and receiving additional training at Maxwell Field, Alabama, Wilkins was assigned to duty in the Philippines later in 1941, arriving four days before the attack on Pearl Harbor.

Wilkins was then assigned to the 8th Bombardment Squadron of the 3rd Attack Group, Fifth Air Force. Flying B-25 Mitchells in combat missions out of New Guinea, Wilkins was promoted to first lieutenant, captain, and then to major. In September 1943 he was made squadron commander.

On November 2, 1943, he participated in a bombing raid on Japanese ships as part of the Bombing of Rabaul. Wilkins repeatedly exposed himself to intense anti-aircraft fire and successfully destroyed two enemy vessels. Despite severe damage to his aircraft, he continued to attack until his plane was shot down into the sea, killing him. For his actions during the mission, he was posthumously awarded the Medal of Honor four months later, on March 24, 1944.

== Awards and honors ==

Army Air Forces Senior Pilot Badge
Medal of Honor
Silver Star	Distinguished Flying Cross with three bronze oak leaf clusters	Purple Heart
Air Medal with bronze oak leaf cluster	Army Good Conduct Medal	American Defense Service Medal
American Campaign Medal	Asiatic-Pacific Campaign Medal with three bronze campaign stars	World War II Victory Medal

Army Presidential Unit Citation
with bronze oak leaf cluster

=== Medal of Honor citation ===
Major Wilkins' official Medal of Honor citation reads:

For conspicuous gallantry and intrepidity above and beyond the call of duty in action with the enemy near Rabaul, New Britain, on 2 November 1943. Leading his squadron in an attack on shipping in Simpson Harbor, during which intense antiaircraft fire was expected, Maj. Wilkins briefed his squadron so that his airplane would be in the position of greatest risk. His squadron was the last of 3 in the group to enter the target area. Smoke from bombs dropped by preceding aircraft necessitated a last-second revision of tactics on his part, which still enabled his squadron to strike vital shipping targets, but forced it to approach through concentrated fire, and increased the danger of Maj. Wilkins' left flank position. His airplane was hit almost immediately, the right wing damaged, and control rendered extremely difficult. Although he could have withdrawn, he held fast and led his squadron into the attack. He strafed a group of small harbor vessels, and then, at low level, attacked an enemy destroyer. His 1,000 pound bomb struck squarely amidships, causing the vessel to explode. Although antiaircraft fire from this vessel had seriously damaged his left vertical stabilizer, he refused to deviate from the course. From below-masthead height he attacked a transport of some 9,000 tons, scoring a hit which engulfed the ship in flames. Bombs expended, he began to withdraw his squadron. A heavy cruiser barred the path. Unhesitatingly, to neutralize the cruiser's guns and attract its fire, he went in for a strafing run. His damaged stabilizer was completely shot off. To avoid swerving into his wing planes he had to turn so as to expose the belly and full wing surfaces of his plane to the enemy fire; it caught and crumpled his left wing. Now past control, the bomber crashed into the sea. In the fierce engagement Maj. Wilkins destroyed 2 enemy vessels, and his heroic self-sacrifice made possible the safe withdrawal of the remaining planes of his squadron.

=== Memorials ===
Wilkins' remains were never recovered; a marker in his memory was placed at Olive Branch Cemetery in his hometown of Portsmouth, Virginia.

Yokota Air Base in Japan was to have been changed to Wilkins Army Airfield (WAAB) after him, but orders for this never arrived, and it remained under the name Yokota. Some metal manhole covers stamped "WAAB" remained in use around the base as of 2017. There was a stadium named for him at the base, and there is still a Wilkins street.

On November 2, 2003 (the sixtieth anniversary of Wilkins' death), the North Carolina Department of Transportation named U.S. Route 64 through Tyrell County, N.C., the "Major Raymond H. Wilkins Memorial Highway" for his courage and self sacrifice.

Wilkins' name is inscribed on the Tyrrell County War Memorial, Columbia.

== See also ==
- List of Medal of Honor recipients
