= Pappy Gunn =

American naval aviator (1899–1957)

Paul Gunn
- Born: October 18, 1899; Quitman, Arkansas
- Died: October 11, 1957 (aged 57); Philippines
- Military career
- Allegiance: United States
- Branch: United States Navy; United States Army Air Forces
- Service years: 1919–1939; 1941–1945
- Rank: Chief Petty Officer (Navy); Colonel (Army Air Force)
- Nickname: Pappy
- Conflicts: World War II
- Awards: Silver Star; Distinguished Flying Cross (2); Legion of Merit; Air Medal; Purple Heart (9)

Paul Irvin "Pappy" Gunn (October 18, 1899 – October 11, 1957) was a former United States naval aviator known mainly for his actions in the Second World War as an officer in the United States Army Air Forces. He was known as "an expert in dare-devil low-level flying," and recognized for numerous feats of heroism and mechanical ingenuity, especially modifications to the Douglas A-20 Havoc light bomber and B-25 Mitchell medium bomber that turned them into attack aircraft.

== Biography ==
=== Early life ===
Born in Quitman, Arkansas, Gunn enlisted in the Navy prior to America's entry into the First World War and eventually served as an aircraft mechanic while learning to fly on his own time. Reenlisting in 1923, he was selected as a Naval Aviation Pilot- an enlisted United States Naval Aviator. He served in the Tophatters, one of the Navy's oldest fighter squadrons then known as VF-1B, and served as a flight instructor at NAS Pensacola before retiring from the Navy as a Chief Petty Officer in December 1939 after 21 years' service.

=== World War II ===
He then co-founded Philippine Air Lines, using five privately owned Beechcraft planes, and operated the air freight operation in the Philippines at the start of World War II.

He flew evacuation missions for US military personnel out of Japanese-held territory on a volunteer basis before being directly commissioned into the US Army Air Forces. Gunn was awarded the Distinguished Flying Cross (US) in 1942 for flying an unarmed, unarmored airplane into hostile airspace to deliver medical supplies to the besieged troops on Bataan. In April 1942 he flew a B-25 on the Royce Mission to the Philippines, a mission that was originally intended to bring relief to US forces on Bataan. Gunn's wife, Polly, with their two sons and two daughters, were interned at the Santo Tomas Internment Camp in Manila.

General George C. Kenney, the new commander of the Allied air forces in the Southwest Pacific Theater, arrived in Australia in the summer of 1942. He found Gunn converting the A-20s of the 3d Bombardment Group (Light) into strafers by adding four .50-caliber machine guns to the Havocs' noses. When Gen Kenney learned that Gunn was using weapons from wrecked fighters, he was impressed by Gunn's innovative abilities and immediately made him a member of his personal staff, placing the old naval aviator in charge of special projects. When the A-20s proved highly successful in low-level strikes against Japanese shipping and ground targets, Gen Kenney gave Gunn the go-ahead to convert a squadron of B-25s into similar strafers. Gunn's converted A-20s and B-25s played the major role in the Allied victory in the 1943 Battle of the Bismarck Sea. North American Aviation eventually began to incorporate variations of Gunn's armament innovations into later models of the B-25. These later model aircraft, including the heavily armed B-25G, B-25H, and some Js, with the gun version of the B-25J being equipped with no less than 18 .50-caliber machine guns. These aircraft continued to wreak devastation on Japanese targets in New Guinea, the Philippines, and Okinawa until the end of the war.

In addition to the DFC and eventual second award, Gunn was also awarded the Silver Star, Legion of Merit, Air Medal, 9 Purple Hearts, and WWII Victory Medal.

=== Later life ===
After Japan's surrender in World War II, Gunn turned to rebuilding his Philippine Air Lines. The company provided flights across the south Pacific Ocean.

=== Death ===
Gunn died when his plane crashed in a storm over the Philippines on October 11, 1957. There were no survivors.

== Legacy ==
Arkansas Aviation Historical Society inducted Gunn into the Arkansas Aviation Hall of Fame in 2008.

== Bibliography ==
- Bruning, John R. (2016). Indestructible: One man's rescue mission that changed the course of WWII. New York City: Hachette Books. ISBN 978-0-316-33940-7. LCCN 2016021715. OCLC 948572948. OL 27222684M.
- Kenney, George Churchill (2017) [first published 1959]. The Saga of Pappy Gunn. ISBN 978-1-5212-7254-1. OCLC 1000156805. OL 38580813M.
