= 6th Weapons Squadron =

6th Weapons Squadron

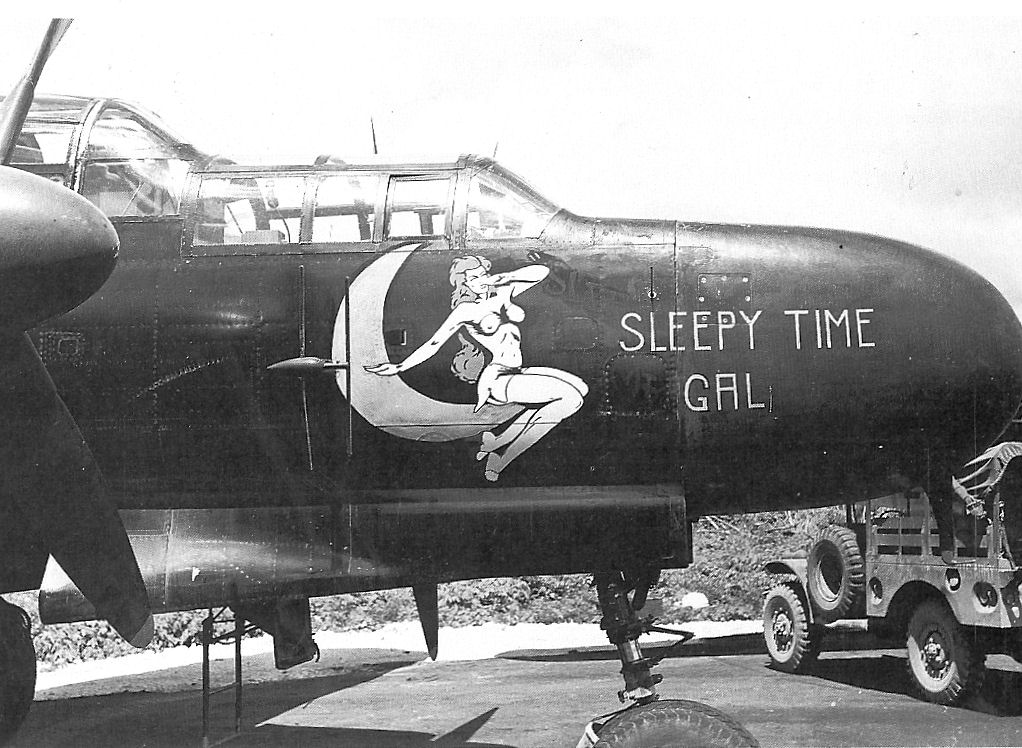
- 6th Night Fighter Squadron P-61A Black Widow on Saipan (Note: Aircraft is Northrop P-61A Black Widow, serial 42-5598 "Sleepy Time Gal". Taken on East Field, Saipan, Mariana Islands, September 1944.)
- Active: 1917–1947, 2017–present
- Country: United States
- Branch: United States Air Force
- Role: Advanced Fighter Training
- Part of: Air Combat Command: United States Air Force Warfare Center; 57th Wing; USAF Weapons School
- Garrison/HQ: Nellis Air Force Base, Nevada
- Engagements: World War II (Asia-Pacific Theater): Central Pacific Campaign; New Guinea Campaign; Northern Solomons Campaign; Western Pacific Campaign; Air Combat, Asiatic-Pacific Theater

Insignia
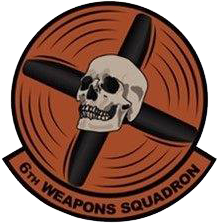
- 6th Weapons Squadron emblem

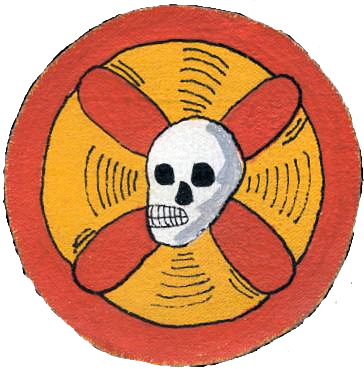
- 6th Night Fighter Squadron emblem (approved 8 July 1924)

The 6th Weapons Squadron is an active United States Air Force unit. It is assigned to the USAF Weapons School, based at Nellis Air Force Base, Nevada. It was previously assigned to the Seventh Air Force, being inactivated at Yokota Airfield, Japan on 20 February 1947.

The unit was one of the initial Aero Squadrons established by the United States Army Signal Corps, its origins dating to 13 March 1917 prior to the United States' entry into World War I. It was the first Air Service squadron assigned to Hawaii. It was part of the island's defenses until entering into combat during World War II in the Southwest Pacific Area as a night fighter squadron in 1944.

== History ==
=== Prior military aviation in Hawaii ===
The origins of the unit date to 29 June 1913 when Lieutenant Harold Geiger, along with about 12 enlisted men and a civilian engine expert, George B. Purington, left the Army aerodrome at North Island (later Rockwell Field), San Diego, California to establish an air school in Hawaii. Aircraft sent by the Signal Corps arrived at Honolulu Harbor on 13 July, consisting of a Curtiss Model E two-seat seaplane and a Curtiss G aircraft, along with some spare parts, tents, some equipment and two motorcycles.

The school in Hawaii was not a success due to problems with the aircraft, unsuitable flying conditions which also tore up the unit's tents, and the commander at Fort Kamehameha would not sanction any regular flying instruction. Neither did he want the planes to take part in maneuvers. The planes were sold in November 1913 and Geiger and most of his detachment left Hawaii for the United States.

=== Origins ===
In December 1916, the Signal Corps decided to expand the number of Aero Squadrons from two to seven because of World War I. A flying unit was first organized in December 1916 at the Army Flying School at Rockwell Field and to be sent to Fort Kamehameha to establish a permanent air presence on the islands. At the time, the Army would not officially activate a unit until it was fully manned, equipped and trained.

At Rockwell Field, the unit was equipped with Curtiss JN-4s and two Curtiss N-9 seaplanes, along with a complement of mechanics and equipment. Captain John F. Curry was relieved from duty with the 1st Aero Squadron in New Mexico and ordered to Fort Kamehameha in January 1917 with orders to establish a seaplane base. Captain John B. Brooks and 49 men arrived from Rockwell Field on 13 March 1917 and the 6th Aero Squadron was officially activated.

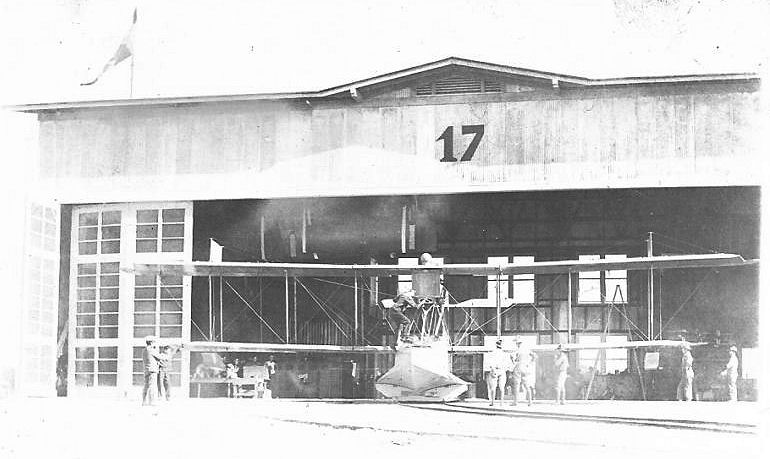
Early photo of a 6th Aero Squadron Curtiss HS-2L flying boat in a hangar at Luke Field

=== Establishing a base in Hawaii ===
Captain Curry was informed that the aircraft being sent to Hawaii to equip the squadron would be flying boats, and he was to find a location near the water. Curry chose Ford Island in Pearl Harbor as the permanent base for the 6th Squadron for several reasons: "It had excellent approaches and plenty of water for landings and take-offs. It faced into the prevailing wind and a land airdrome could be easily made, and it was the cheapest and most available land (really the only available land) that fulfilled all the requirements for the operation of the squadron. Curry's recommendations to situate the squadron at Ford Island were approved locally then, also, in Washington. The Oahu Sugar Company surrendered its leasehold to Ford Island in late 1917 to complete the sale. It was understood by the War Department that both the Navy and the Army would use Ford Island.

On 25 September 1917 the 6th Aero Squadron abandoned Fort Kamehameha and moved to the new site. They began clearing the land to establish the first Army Air Service station in Hawaii. The squadron remained in Hawaii throughout the United States involvement in World War I and did not deploy to the Western Front in France.

=== Intra-War period ===
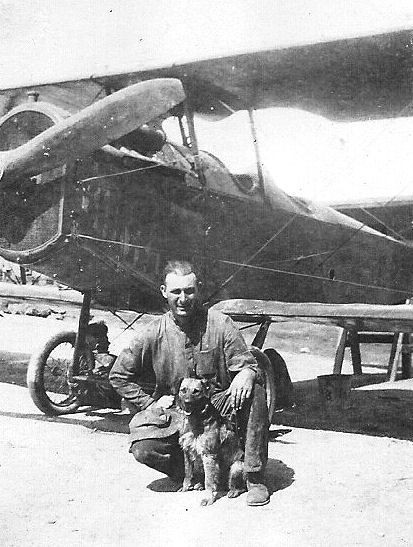
A 6th Aero Squadron member with the squadron mascot in front of a Dayton-Wright DH-4 at Luke Field, 1920

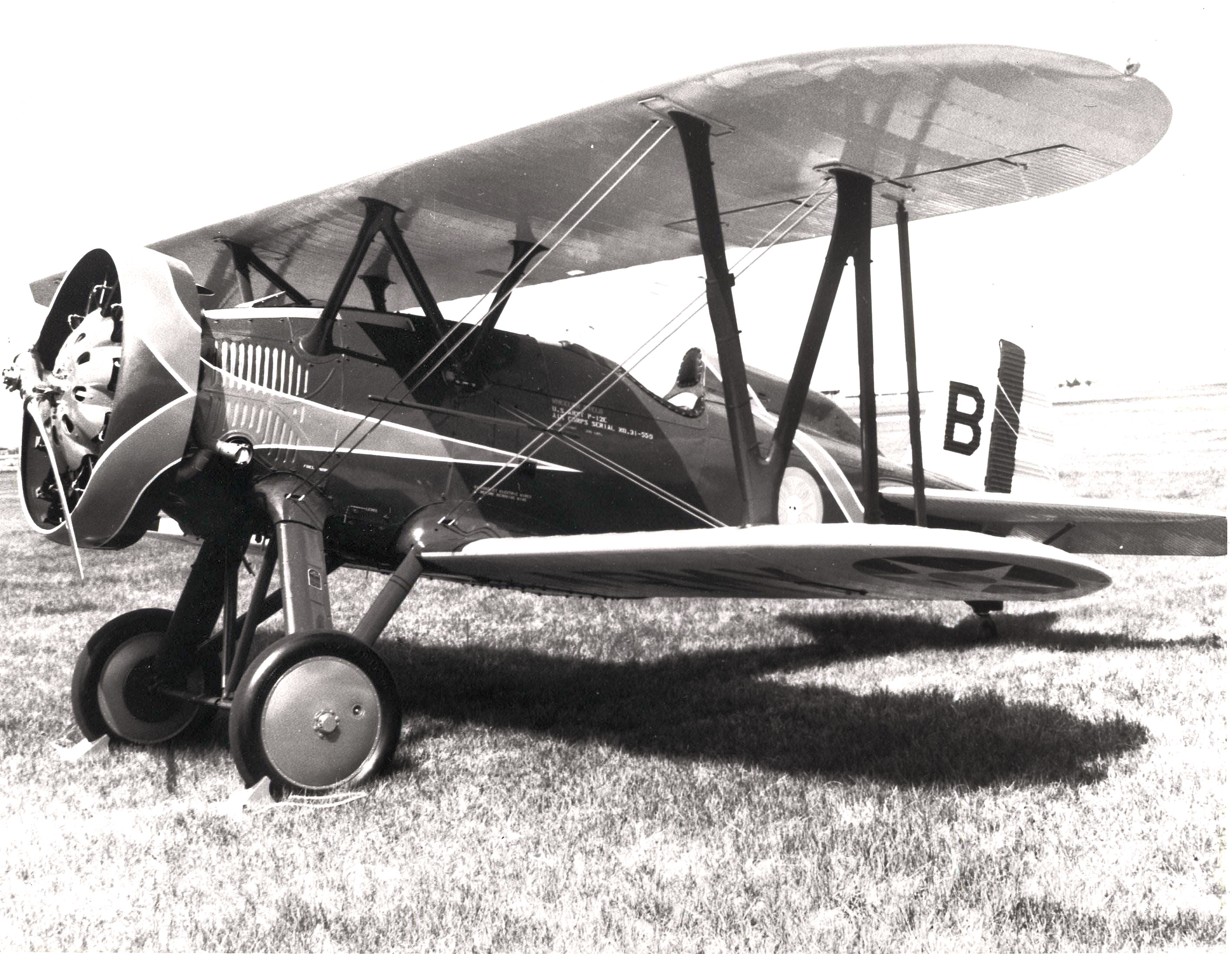
Boeing P-12E of the 6th Pursuit Squadron, Wheeler Field, 1935

After the end of World War I, the 6th Aero Squadron was retained by the Army on the active list of Air Service squadrons. The airfield on Ford Island was officially renamed Luke Field in 1919 after World War I fighter pilot Frank Luke who was killed in action over the Western Front.

On 15 August 1919, the 2d Group (Observation) was formed in Hawaii by the Air Service, the 6th Aero Squadron being assigned on 15 September. It was joined by the 4th Aero Squadron on 24 January 1920. Along with the reorganization of units, the 6th began to receive newer aircraft, surplus Dayton-Wright DH-4s and Curtiss JN-6s from World War I, along with a captured Fokker D.VIII from Germany and a Thomas-Morse MB-3 that arrived in 1922. With the establishment of the United States Army Air Service in 1921, the squadron was redesignated as the 6th Squadron (Pursuit), and then the 6th Pursuit Squadron on 25 January 1923.

The first inter-island flight occurred in February 1919, and by 1920 inter-island flights were used for training purposes. Also, the first night flight over Oahu took place on 30 June 1920. In the early 1920s, air power began to take its place in the Hawaiian Department's military maneuvers. The growth of the Air Service in Hawaii and the sharing of facilities on Ford Island was, however, causing congestion and other issues. Another airfield was needed to accommodate the growth, and the first detachment of twenty men started clearing land south of Schofield Barracks for Wheeler Field in February 1922.

The 6th Pursuit Squadron, along with the 19th Pursuit Squadron, was reassigned from the 5th Composite Group at Luke Field to the 18th Pursuit Group at Wheeler in January 1927 as part of a realignment of the Hawaiian air defenses. The 5th later became a Bombardment Group.

At Wheeler, the squadron was upgraded with new Boeing PW-9 pursuit fighters as well as keeping its DH-4s. Its mission was the air defense of Hawaii. It also acquired a Fokker C-2 transport for inter-island flights. It was upgraded again in 1931 with Boeing P-12s and then with Boeing P-26 Peashooters and Curtiss P-36 Hawks in 1939, all hand-me-downs from squadrons in the United States.

As a result of tensions between the United States and the Japanese Empire, the Air Corps formed the Hawaiian Air Force, which was activated in November 1940 at Fort Shafter. It was the first Army Air Force outside the continental United States. The Hawaiian Air Force's mission was to integrate the air defenses of Hawaii. In connection with defense plans for the Pacific, Curtiss P-40 Warhawks were brought to Hawaii by aircraft carrier. for the 18th Pursuit Group, however the P-36s remained in service with the 6th Pursuit Group.

=== World War II ===
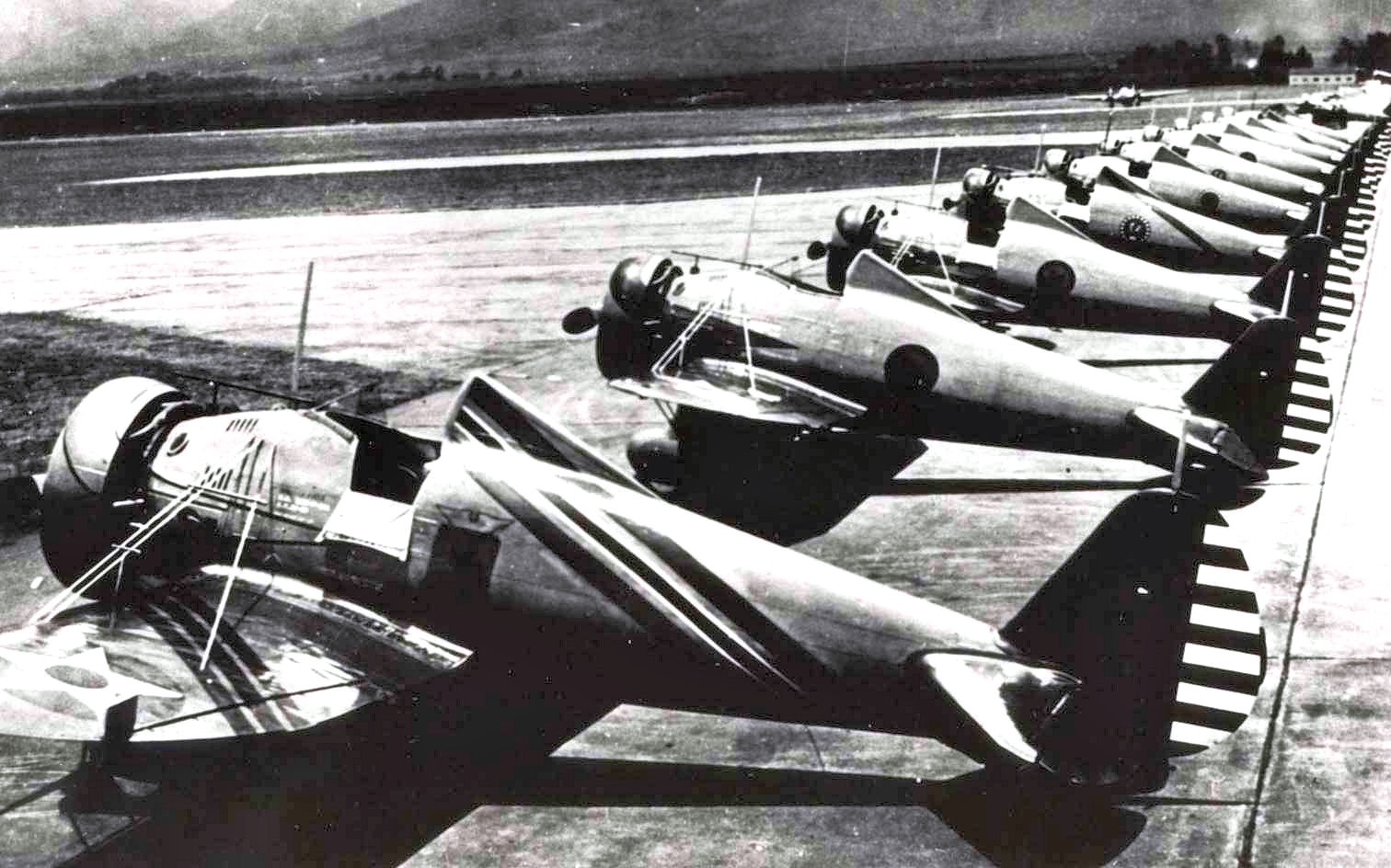
6th Pursuit Squadron Boeing P-26 Peashooters on the line at Wheeler Field, 1940

The Japanese attack on Pearl Harbor destroyed the squadron's 18 P-36As on the line at Wheeler Field, none of the aircraft survived. It was re-equipped with some P-40C Warhawks that were shipped in from the states and the squadron resumed air defense flights in the surrounding waters. It was moved to Kahuku Army Air Field in the northern part of the Island of Oʻahu as a dispersal move in August 1942 where it continued its air defense mission, moving to Kipapa Airfield in November.

At Kipapa, the P-40 Warhawks were replaced with Douglas P-70s and the squadron was redesignated as the 6th Night Fighter Squadron in January 1943. After training in night interception operations in Hawaii, The squadron was deployed to the South Pacific Area and began combat operations in February 1943 from Carney Airfield, Guadalcanal, in an attempt to intercept high-flying Japanese night raiders. The P-70s, however didn't have the speed to intercept the Japanese Mitsubishi A6M Zero, and two Lockheed P-38F Lightnings equipped with radar as single seat night fighters were assigned to the squadron to curb the activities of "Bedcheck Charlie", a Japanese aircraft flying nuisance sorties over Gualdacanal at night.

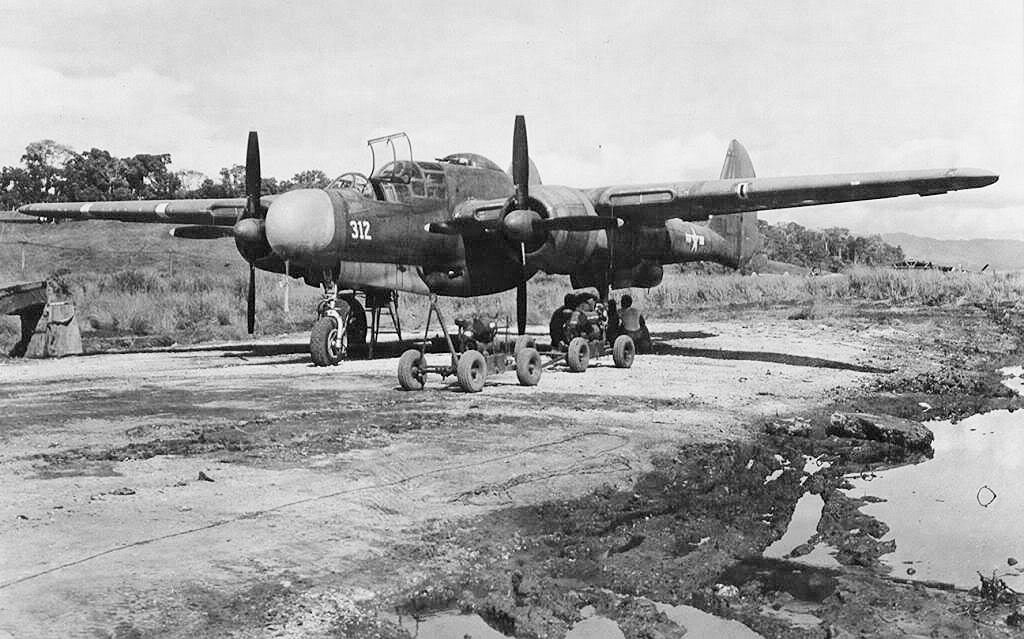
6th Night Fighter Squadron P-61 at a rough airfield somewhere in the Pacific, 1944

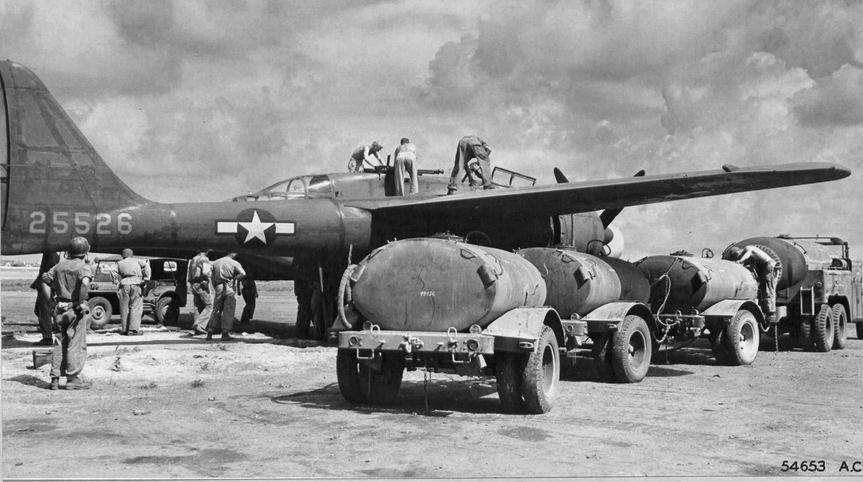
"Nightie Mission" P-61A-1-NO 42-5526 Pictured being fueled and armed on East Field, Saipan, Mariana Islands, 1944

On 20/21 March 1943, Detachment B's P-70s failed to stop Japanese night bombers from damaging fifteen of the 307th Bombardment Group's Consolidated B-24 Liberators and five of the 5th Bombardment Group's Boeing B-17 Flying Fortresses on the ground at Henderson Field on Guadalcanal. Eight months later, in November, enemy night bombers sank one and damaged three Allied ships at Bougainville Island. The Army Air Forces concluded from this initial experiment in night fighting that "it proved impossible to prevent the Japanese from inflicting some damage" on U.S. ground and surface forces.

The 6th received its first Northrop P-61 Black Widows in early June 1944. The aircraft were quickly assembled and underwent flight testing as the pilots transitioned from the squadron's aging P-70s. The first operational P-61 mission occurred on 25 June. On 30 June 1944, the P-61 scored its first kill when a Japanese Mitsubishi G4M Betty bomber was shot down. Japanese night bombers launched a major effort to disrupt the construction of U.S. airfields on Saipan needed for the Boeing B-29 Superfortress campaign against the home islands. Flying P-61s, the 6th began defensive operations nine days after the Marines' 15 June landing on Saipan. Enemy attackers held the initiative until new Microwave Early Warning radars linked to SCR-615 and AN/TPS-10 "Li’l Abner" height finder radars made three Japanese sorties one-way trips. In thirty-seven attempts at interception from 24 June to 21 July, the defense of the island made twenty-seven airborne radar contacts and claimed three kills.

A typical Japanese aerial assault force consisted of a dozen Mitsubishi G4M Betty bombers flying twenty miles apart. P-61 crews discovered that if they could shoot down the lead bomber, the others would jettison their bombs and flee. Black Widows from the 6th and 548th Night Fighter Squadrons downed five additional enemy intruders before the attacks stopped in January 1945. The 6th flew defensive patrols to protect the B-29 bases there until the end of the war.

=== Postwar and inactivation ===
With the end of combat, the 6th Night Fighter Squadron returned to Hawaii and its personnel complement was substantially reduced. It was transferred to Occupied Japan in June 1946 where it became part of the air defense of Japan. It was inactivated in February 1947, its personnel and equipment being transferred to the 339th Fighter Squadron (All Weather).

=== Reactivation ===
On 20 June 2017 at the Lightning Aircraft Maintenance Unit hangar at Nellis Air Force Base, Nevada, the squadron was reactivated as the 6th Weapons Squadron at an assumption of command ceremony. Lt. Col. Michael Blauser assumed command from United States Air Force Weapons School Commandant Col. Michael Drowley. The squadron will be assigned the Lockheed Martin F-35A Lightning II and will develop the F-35 weapons instructor course curriculum. The 6th is projected to be the Weapons School's largest squadron by 2023, with 30 instructors and 24 assigned F-35As.

Squadron commanders:

Lt Col “Double” Blauser 2017–2019

Lt Col “Bluto” Sabian 2019–2021

Lt Col “Rash” Carrol 2021–2022

Lt Col “Dante” Burgoon 2022–2024

== Lineage ==
- Organized as the 6th Aero Squadron on 13 March 1917

Redesignated 6th Squadron (Pursuit) on 14 March 1921
Redesignated 6th Pursuit Squadron on 25 January 1923
Redesignated 6th Pursuit Squadron (Interceptor) on 6 December 1939
Redesignated 6th Fighter Squadron on 15 May 1942
Redesignated 6th Night Fighter Squadron on 17 January 1943
Inactivated on 20 February 1947

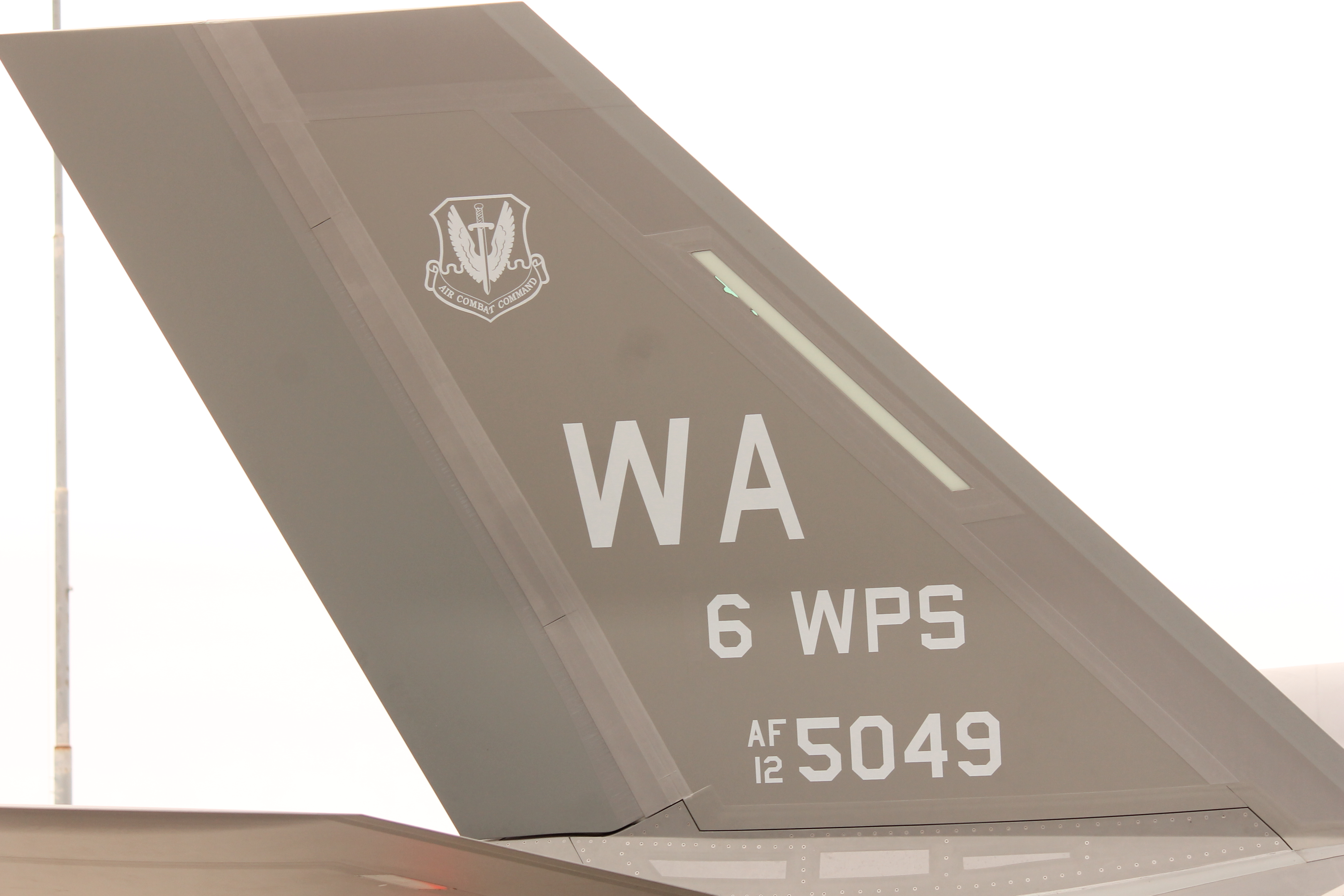
Tail of a 6th Weapons Squadron Lockheed Martin F-35 Lightning II at Aviation Nation 2017

- Redesignated 6th Weapons Squadron on 12 June 2017

Activated 20 June 2017

=== Assignments ===
- Hawaiian Department, 13 March 1917
- 2d Group (Observation) (later 5th Group (Observation), 5th Group (Pursuit and Bombardment), 5th Group (Composite), 5th Composite Group, 15 September 1919
- 18th Pursuit Group (later 18th Fighter Group), January 1927
- 15th Fighter Group, 16 March 1943
- VII Fighter Command, 5 June 1944 (attached to 318th Fighter Group, 11 January-16 March 1945)
- 7th Fighter Wing, 12 May 1945
- Pacific Air Command, 1 January 1946
- United States Air Force Weapons School, 20 June 2017

=== Stations ===
- Fort Kamehameha, Hawaii Territory, 13 March 1917
- Ford Island (later Luke Field), Hawaii, 25 September 1918
- Wheeler Field, Hawaii, 11 January 1927
- Kahuku Army Air Field, Hawaii, 30 August 1942
- Kipapa Airfield, Hawaii, 17 November 1942 – 3 March 1944

Detached to Carney Airfield, Guadalcanal, Solomon Islands, 28 February–15 December 1943, Jackson Airfield (7 Mile Drome), Port Moresby, New Guinea, 18 April–15 December 1943)

- John Rogers Field, Hawaii, 3 March–28 October 1944

Detached: to East Field (Saipan), Mariana Islands, 21 June 1944 – 1 May 1945

- Kipapa Airfield, Hawaii, 28 October 1944
- Wheeler Field, Hawaii, 2 October 1945
- Atsugi Airfield, Japan, 11 June 1946
- Yokota Airfield, Japan, 1 September 1946 – 20 February 1947
- Nellis Air Force Base, Nevada, c. 20 June 2017

=== Aircraft ===
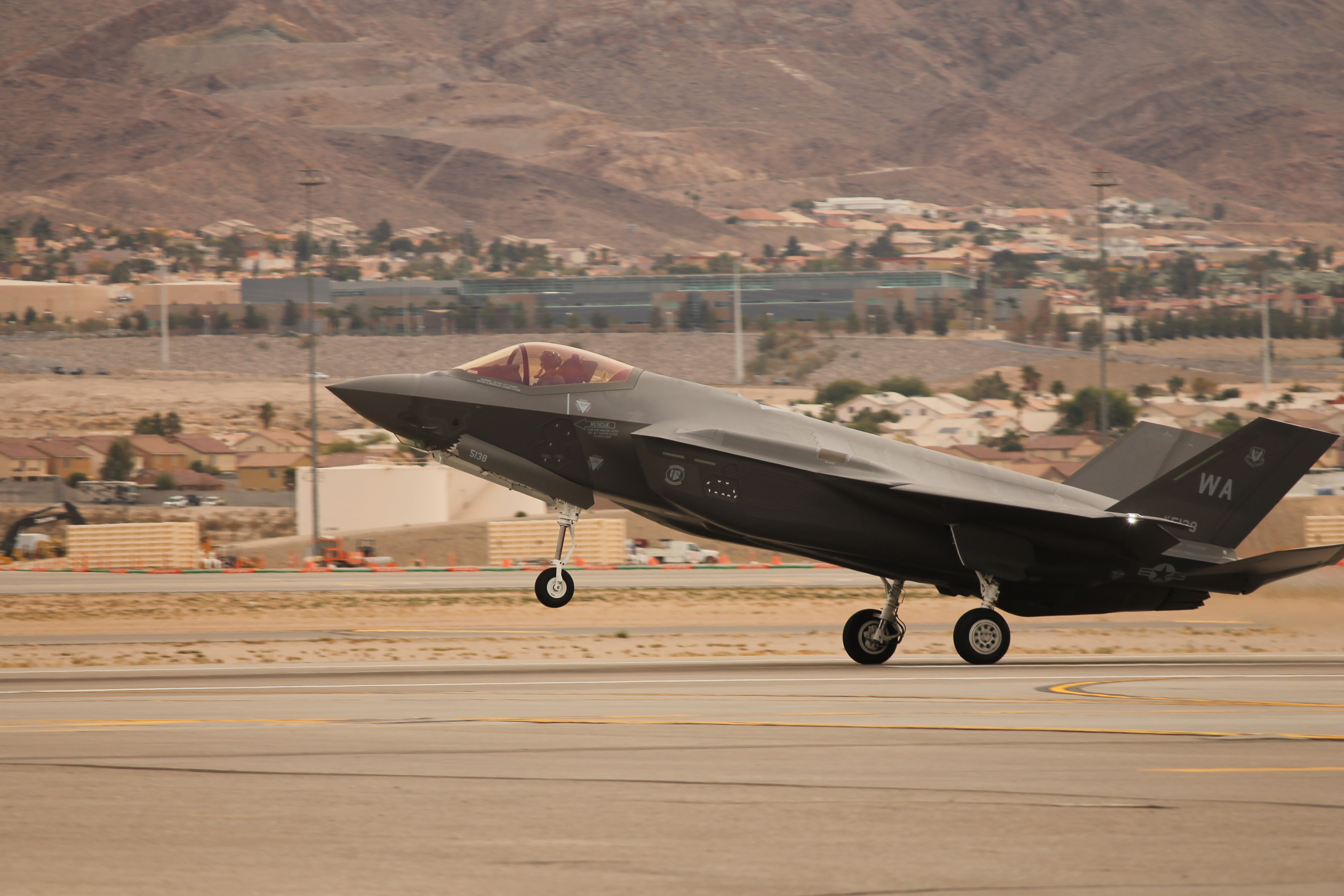
A Lockheed F-35A Lightning II landing at Nellis Air Force Base during Aviation Nation 2017.

- Curtiss N-G (1918–1920)
- Curtiss R-6 (1918–1920)
- Curtiss HS2L (1918–1926)
- Dayton-Wright DH-4 (1920–1930)
- Curtiss JN-6 (1920–1926)
- Thomas-Morse MB-3 (1920–1926)
- Fokker D.VIII (1920–1926)
- Boeing PW-9 (1927–1938)
- Fokker C-2 (1927–1930)
- Boeing P-12 (1931–1938)
- Martin B-12 (1931–1941)
- Curtiss A-3 Falcon (1931–1938)
- Boeing P-26 Peashooter (1939–1941)
- Curtiss P-36 Hawk (1939–1941)
- Curtiss A-12 Shrike (1939–1941)
- Grumman OA-9 Goose (1939–1941)
- Curtiss P-40 Warhawk, 1941–1942
- Douglas B-18 Bolo, 1942
- Douglas P-70 Havoc, 1942–1944
- Lockheed P-38 Lightning, 1943
- Republic P-47 Thunderbolt, 1943–1945
- Northrop P-61 Black Widow, 1944–1947
- McDonnell Douglas F-4 Phantom II, 1971–1990
- Lockheed-Martin F-35A Lightning II, 2017–present

== See also ==
- List of American aero squadrons
