= John Henebry =

United States Air Force general (1918–2007)

John P. Henebry
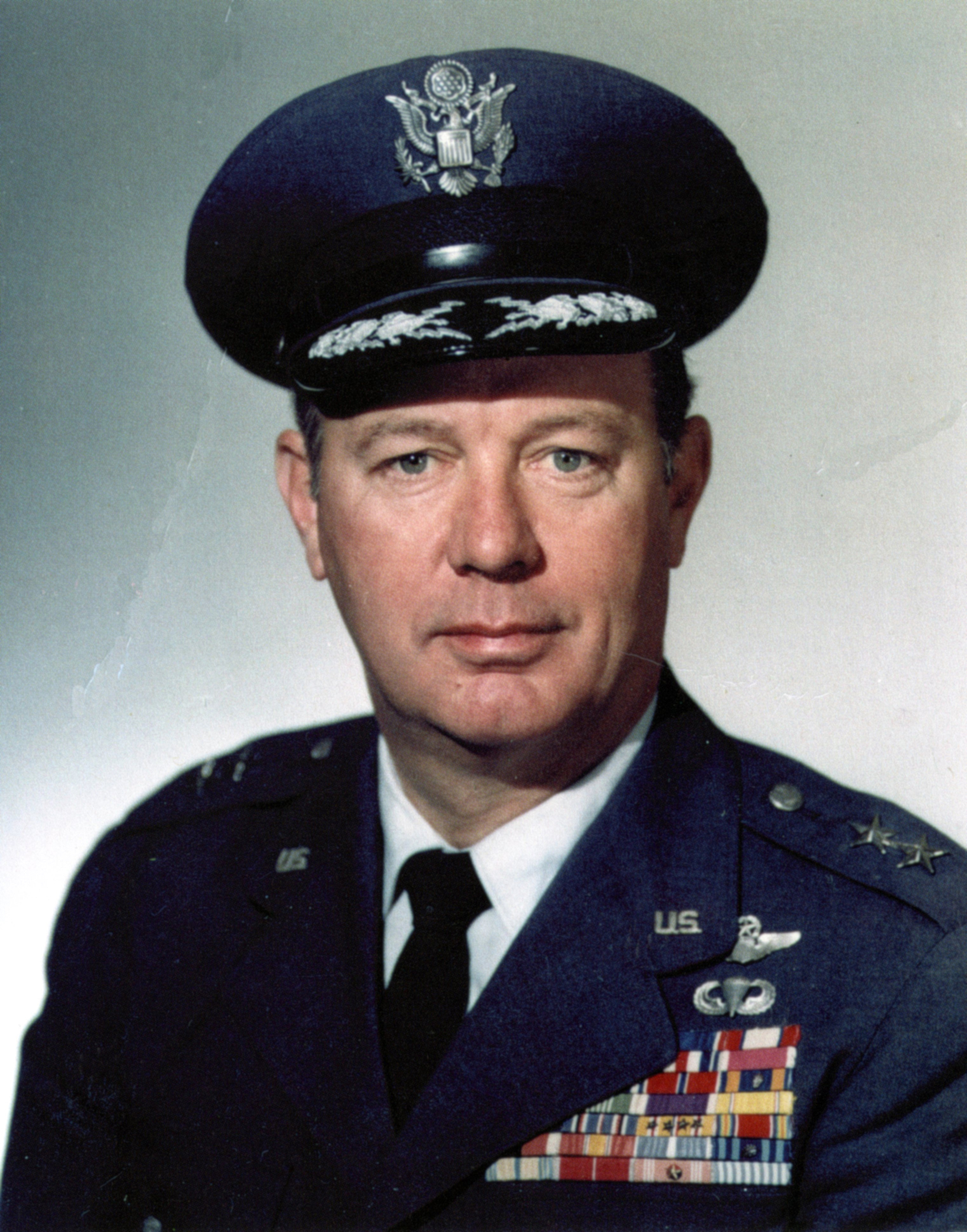
- Born: February 14, 1918; Plainfield, Illinois, U.S.
- Died: September 30, 2007 (aged 89); Evanston, Illinois, U.S.
- Burial place: Bement Cemetery; Bement, Illinois, U.S.
- Military career
- Allegiance: United States
- Branch: United States Air Force
- Service years: 1940–1976
- Rank: Major General
- Nickname: Jock
- Commands: 13th Bombardment Squadron; 90th Attack Squadron; 3d Bombardment Group; 360th Air Service Group; 437th Troop Carrier Wing; 315th Air Division
- Conflicts: World War II; Korean War
- Awards: Distinguished Service Cross; Army Distinguished Service Medal; Silver Star; Legion of Merit (2); Distinguished Flying Cross (4); Bronze Star Medal; Purple Heart; Air Medal (2)

John Philip Henebry CBE (February 14, 1918 – September 30, 2007) was a United States Air Force major general.

== Early life ==
He was born in Plainfield, Illinois. In 1936, he graduated from Campion High School in Prairie du Chien, Wisconsin, and then went to the University of Notre Dame in Notre Dame, Indiana, where he graduated from in 1940.

== Military career ==
On July 30, 1940, he was appointed a flying cadet and after graduating from Air Corps basic and advanced flying schools was commissioned a second lieutenant in the Air Reserve March 14, 1941, and assigned to active duty with the 22d Bombardment Group at Langley Field in Virginia.

In May, 1941, General Henebry was appointed leader of “C” Flight and armament and chemical officer of the 39th Bombardment Squadron, 13th Bombardment Group, with which he served at various stations in the United States.

=== World War II ===
In August, 1942, he went to the Southwest Pacific theater as commander of the 13th Bomb Squadron, and soon thereafter assumed command of the 90th Attack Squadron there. Flying North American B-25 Mitchell bombers, he helped plan attacks utilizing skip bombing and took part in the Battle of the Bismarck Sea, where he attacked a damaged Japanese destroyer and two freighters in low-level runs. On November 2, 1943, he was shot down after leading a major air attack on the Japanese stronghold of Rabaul, but was rescued by a U.S. Navy PT boat, after ditching off the coast of the island of Kiriwina. He later served as operations officer and commander of the 3d Bombardment Group in that theater, and in January, 1945, assumed command of the 360th Air Service Group of the Far East Air Force. He flew a total of 219 missions during the war and was present aboard the battleship Missouri in Tokyo Bay when the Japanese surrendered on September 2, 1945.

=== Post war ===
Henebry returned to the United States in October, 1945, for duty with the Air Technical Service Command at Wright Field in Ohio. He was relieved of active duty the following December to work with a pneumatic tools company in Chicago. From 1948 to 1950, he was assistant utility sales manager for a coal company in Chicago.

He was recalled to active duty on August 14, 1950, and appointed commanding general of the 437th Troop Carrier Wing (Medium), which he later took to Korea. In January, 1951, he assumed command of the 315th Air Division (Combat Cargo) in Korea and took part in Operation Courageous. Henebry was hospitalized in Tachikawa, Japan, in February, 1952. He returned to the United States for further hospitalization at Walter Reed Army Medical Center, until his release in June, 1952.

Henebry continued to serve in the Air Force Reserve, including duty with the Air Staff, Headquarters U.S. Air Force, Washington, D.C., in connection with Air Force Reserve Policy. He also served as president of the Air Force Association in 1956-1957. Among his varied business concerns, he was the founder and president of Skymotive Aviation Management Corporation, an airline service company with offices at O’Hare International Airport in Chicago. He remained in the Air Force Reserve until 1976, retiring at the rank of major general.

== Later life ==
Henebry and wife Mary had two sons and three daughters, and several grand and great-grandchildren. His wife predeceased him on 2005.

After his retirement from the Air Force, Henebry and his family lived in Winnetka, Illinois. He died in Evanston, Illinois on September 30, 2007, at the age of 89. He was buried at Bement Cemetery in Bement, Illinois.

== Awards and decorations ==
His awards include:

USAF Command Pilot Badge
USAF Parachutist Badge
Distinguished Service Cross
Army Distinguished Service Medal	Silver Star	Legion of Merit with bronze oak leaf cluster
Distinguished Flying Cross with three bronze oak leaf clusters	Bronze Star Medal	Purple Heart
Air Medal with bronze oak leaf cluster	Army Commendation Medal	Air Force Presidential Unit Citation
American Defense Service Medal	American Campaign Medal	Asiatic-Pacific Campaign Medal with four bronze campaign stars
World War II Victory Medal	Army of Occupation Medal with 'Japan' clasp	National Defense Service Medal
Korean Service Medal	Air Force Longevity Service Award with bronze oak leaf cluster	Armed Forces Reserve Medal with silver hourglass device
Philippine Liberation Medal with service star	Commander of the Order of the British Empire (United Kingdom)	Order of Military Merit; Eulji Medal with gold star (South Korea)
Republic of Korea Presidential Unit Citation	United Nations Korea Medal	Republic of Korea War Service Medal

== Published works ==
- Henebry, John, The Grim Reapers At Work in the Pacific Theater: The Third Attack Group of the U.S. Fifth Air Force, 2002.
