= Odd Andersen =

Norwegian footballer (1920-2007)

Personal information
- Date of birth: 30 May 1920
- Place of birth: Fredrikstad, Norway
- Date of death: 24 September 2007 (aged 87)
- Position: Midfielder

International career
Years	Team	Apps	(Gls)
1949	Norway	1	(0)

Odd Andersen (30 May 1920 – 24 September 2007) was a Norwegian footballer. He played in one match for the Norway national football team in 1949.
