= Colin Mitchell (cricketer) =

English cricketer

Personal information
- Full name: Colin Gerald Mitchell
- Born: 27 January 1929; Brislington, Bristol, England
- Died: 13 September 2007 (aged 78); Brislington, Bristol, England
- Batting: Right-handed
- Bowling: Right-arm fast-medium
- Role: Bowler

Domestic team information
- Years: Team
- 1952–54: Somerset
- First-class debut: 7 June 1952 Somerset v Sussex
- Last First-class: 17 August 1954 Somerset v Essex

Career statistics
Competition	First-class
Matches	30
Runs scored	186
Batting average	7.44
100s/50s	–/–
Top score	26*
Balls bowled	3907
Wickets	53
Bowling average	38.39
5 wickets in innings	2
10 wickets in match	1
Best bowling	6/62
Catches/stumpings	9/–
- Source: CricketArchive, 9 February 2011

Colin Gerald Mitchell, born at Brislington, Bristol on 27 January 1929 and died there on 13 September 2007, played first-class cricket as an amateur for Somerset in the early 1950s.

Mitchell was a lower-order right-handed batsman and a right-arm fast-medium bowler. He played four matches for Somerset in the 1952 season, when the side finished bottom of the County Championship for the first of four consecutive seasons, and then turned out for them regularly in the 1953 season, when the side was perhaps even weaker. He had one highly successful match – though, true to form, Somerset lost the game. Against Worcestershire at Frome, he took six of the eight wickets to fall in the first innings at a personal cost of 62 runs, and then five of the seven that fell in the second innings, to finish with match figures of 11 for 177. In between these two bowling performances, he made an unbeaten 26, batting at No 11 in Somerset's second innings, so his two best bowling returns and his highest first-class score all came in the same game.

After the 1953 season, he made only two further first-class appearances, both in August 1954, without success.
