= Aviation Nation =

Major Airshow in the United States

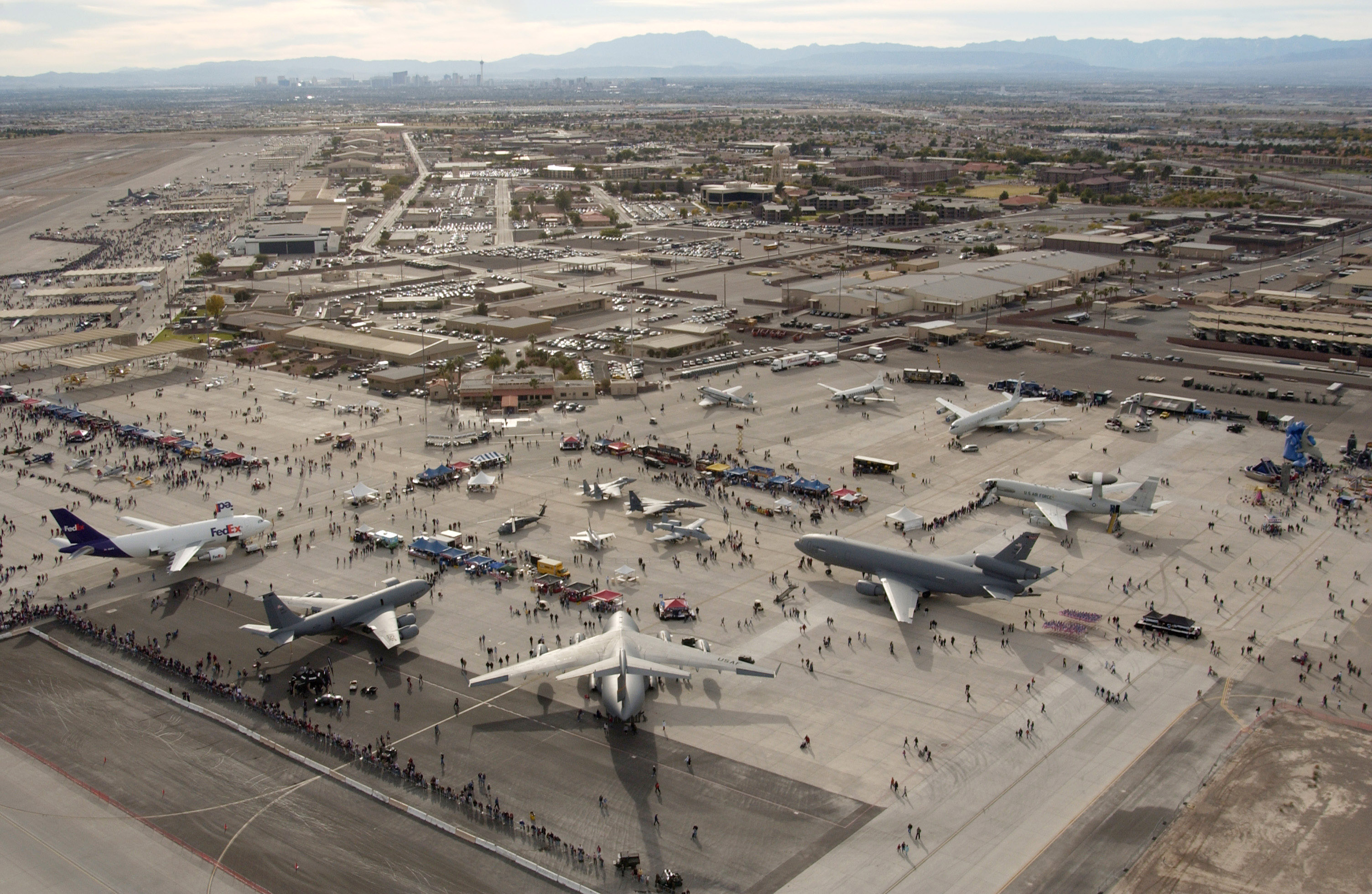
- View of Aviation Nation 2006
- Genre: Air show
- Dates: November
- Venue: Nellis Air Force Base
- Location: Clark County, Nevada
- Coordinates: 36°14′27.29″N 115°2′5.5″W
- Country: U.S.A.
- Established: 2002
- Attendance: 140,000 - 200,000
- Organizer: United States Air Force
- Website: http://www.nellis.af.mil/AirShow.aspx

Aviation Nation, sometimes referred to as America's Air Show, is the annual award-winning air show of the United States Air Force (USAF). The show is hosted at Nellis Air Force Base near Las Vegas, Nevada every few years.

Being held at Nellis means that the USAF Thunderbirds display team usually perform at this air show at their home base as their last show of the year. Since Nellis is the leading USAF combat training center, the show is able to feature the newest Air Force aircraft like the F-22 Raptor and F-35 Lighting II.

The air show is a three-day event and is open to the public for the last two days. Guests who are unable to normally access the base can park at the Las Vegas Motor Speedway and ride a free shuttle bus to the base tarmac to view aircraft static displays, tour some aircraft, visit vending booths, and watch aerial demonstrations.

== History ==
The show began in 2002. The 2013 Aviation Nation air show was canceled due to federal budget cuts. Aviation Nation returned in November 2014. There was no show in 2015. For 2016 the air show's theme was "75 Years of Airpower" and was held on Nov 11-13th. The theme for the 2017 air show was "Breaking Barriers Since 1947" which celebrates the 70th anniversary of the U.S. Air Force. The 2019 show was themed "Salute to Our Veterans."

== See also ==
- Aviation Nation 2004 video
- Wikipedia: Major Airshows
