= Robert Fidgeon =

Australian journalist

- Born: 15 October 1941
- Died: 2 September 2007)

Robert Fidgeon (15 October 1941 – 2 September 2007) was a television writer and critic for the Melbourne based newspaper, the Herald Sun. He wrote a regular column in the section, The Guide.

== Career ==
Fidgeon had harboured ambitions to write about the television industry – first, when working as a layout artist, and later as head of the Herald Sun art department. However, he continued to gravitate towards TV, eventually becoming editor of The Guide. Shortly before his death his final article broke the news of the Australian journalist Ray Martin's resignation from the Nine Network.

=== Quotes about Fidgeon ===
"In an astonishing testimony to his professionalism he alerted the news desk on the morning he went into hospital for the last time. Robert will be missed by his colleagues at the Herald Sun and his hundreds of thousands of regular readers." – Bruce Guthrie, Herald Sun editor-in-chief.

"He fought his illness so bravely and you could tell when he wrote about television that he really loved it. Some TV critics hate television, but with Robert he was always writing how it could be better." – Eddie McGuire, Television presenter.

"Melbourne has been truly fortunate to have had a TV writer who was also a huge fan of the medium and a supporter of the people who have made it." – Rove McManus, Television presenter.

== Personal life ==
Fidgeon's wife, Patrice, is associate editor of New Idea magazine; he had a stepdaughter, Kate, five children Jaye, Janet, Gregory, Adam and Jodie and eight grandchildren Chelsea, Georgia, Ella, Emily, Emily, Ben, Luke and Isabella. Following a long battle with bowel and liver cancer, he was rushed to hospital where his condition progressively worsened and he soon succumbed to it.
