= Wu Xiangxiang =

Chinese historian

- 吳相湘
- Born: 1912; Changde, Hunan, Republic of China
- Died: 2007 (aged 94–95); Illinois, United States
- Occupation: Historian

Academic background
- Education: Peking University

Academic work
- Discipline: History
- Sub-discipline: History of the Republic of China
- Notable works: Biography of the Republic of China

Wu Xiangxiang (simplified Chinese: 吴相湘; traditional Chinese: 吳相湘; pinyin: Wú Xiāngxiāng; 1912 – 21 September 2007) was a Chinese historian.

== Biography ==
Wu was born in Baisheng Lane, Changde, Hunan, in 1912. His great-grandfather Wu Qingyu (吳慶玉) and grandfather Wu Jintang (吳金棠; 1847 -1937) were small merchants. His father Wu Qilin (吳其林; 1878 - 1937) was a member of the Tongmenghui. In 1922, he moved to Changsha, capital of Hunan province, and entered Chuyi School (楚怡小學). Four years later, he attended the Mingde High School. In 1937, he graduated from Peking University, where he majored in history.

After university, Wu worked at the Academia Sinica in Changsha. When the Second Sino-Japanese War broke out, he worked in the Ninth War Zone Command of the Kuomintang. At that time, he wrote The Third Changsha Battle and other articles. After war, he became an editor of Palace Museum and associate professor of Lanzhou University.

After the government of the Republic of China moved to Taiwan, Wu successively worked as a professor of the Department of History of National Taiwan University, chairman of the Department of History of Nanyang University in Singapore, and professor of the Institute of History of the Chinese Culture University. His students included Li Yongchi and Li Ao.

In November 1962, Wu was expelled from the Kuomintang. In 1975, he settled down in the United States. In 1996, he returned to mainland China to attend the International Academic Conference on Sun Yat-sen's 130th Birthday. He died in Illinois, on September 21, 2007, aged 95.

== Works ==
- 三生有幸 [Be the Most Supreme] (in Chinese). Shanghai: Zhong Hua Book Company. 2007. ISBN 9787101058192.
- 风云际会下的书生 [Scholars under the Wind and Cloud] (in Chinese). Beijing: Workers Publishing House. 2009. ISBN 9787500846239.
- 民国五十位军政人物列传 [Biographies of Fifty Military and Political Personalities in the Republic of China] (in Chinese). Beijing: China Workers Publishing House. 2011. ISBN 9787500848172.
- 民国人物列传 [Biography of the Republic of China] (in Chinese). Shanghai: Oriental Publishing House. 2015. ISBN 978-7-5060-7937-2.
- 晚清宫廷实纪 [Court Records in Late Qing Dynasty] (in Chinese). Beijing: Encyclopedia of China Publishing House. 2016. ISBN 9787500097242.
- 现代史事论述 [Modern Historical Events] (in Chinese). Beijing: Encyclopedia of China Publishing House. 2016. ISBN 9787500097280.
- 宋教仁传 [Biography of Song Jiaoren] (in Chinese). Beijing: Encyclopedia of China Publishing House. 2016. ISBN 9787500097075.
