= Bill Robinson (Australian footballer, born 1919) =

Australian rules footballer

Personal information
- Full name: William Haigh Robinson
- Born: 22 January 1919; Daylesford, Victoria
- Died: 2 September 2007 (aged 88)
- Height: 185 cm (6 ft 1 in)
- Weight: 81 kg (179 lb)

Playing career^{1}
Years	Club	Games (Goals)
1938–39	Hawthorn	6 (3)
- ^{1} Playing statistics correct to the end of 1939.

William Haigh Robinson (22 January 1919 – 2 September 2007) was an Australian rules footballer who played with Hawthorn in the Victorian Football League (VFL).

After initially serving in the army reserve, Robinson transferred to the Royal Australian Air Force in 1941, serving as an equipment assistant after unsuccessfully applying to become a pilot.

In 1950 he was seriously injured in a car accident that left him with permanent vision loss.
