= Rajae Belmlih =

Moroccan-Emirati singer

- Born: 22 April 1962; Casablanca, Morocco
- Died: 2 September 2007 (aged 45); Rabat, Morocco
- Occupation: Singer of popular Arabic music

Rajae Belmlih, also spelled Raja Belmalih (Arabic: رجاء بلمليح; 22 April 1962 – 2 September 2007), was a Moroccan-Emirati singer.

== Career ==
Belmlih's career began with the Moroccan talent show, Mawahib. Her first major hit in the Arab World was Ya-Jara Wadina in 1986. The young Rajae, a University undergraduate at the time, decided to sing her first hit song at her Hassan II campus in front of her fellow students prior to the official premiere that same day. She later settled and worked from Cairo, Egypt while continuing her studies in Arabic literature and Philosophy at Mohammed V University in Rabat. She graduated in 1995 and enrolled for a doctorate. Belmlih was named a UNESCO Goodwill Ambassador in 1999 for her numerous actions in favour of charities in the Arab world.

She was an outspoken supporter of women's education in the poorer parts of the Arab world. She was a widely admired and respected figure in her native Morocco, but also elsewhere in the Arab world where her image as a highly educated singer is untainted. She was granted Emirati citizenship as a tribute by the ruling family in Abu Dhabi.

== Death ==
Rajae Belmlih died in Rabat, Morocco, on 2 September 2007, aged 45, following her suffering of breast cancer.

== Albums ==
- Ya Jara Wadeena (1986)
- Sabri Alik Tal (1994)
- Ya Ghayeb (1996)
- Ietiraf (1998)
- Shoq el oyoun (2002)
- Haseb (2005)
