= Robert Bruss =

American journalist

Robert Jacques Bruss
- Born: May 2, 1940; Minneapolis, Minnesota
- Died: September 26, 2007 (aged 67); Hillsborough, California
- Education: Hastings College of the Law
- Occupations: Columnist; Real estate attorney and broker

Robert Jacques Bruss (May 2, 1940, Minneapolis, Minnesota – September 26, 2007, Hillsborough, California) was a real estate attorney and syndicated columnist known as "the Dear Abby of real estate".

He was a 1962 business administration graduate of Northwestern University and a 1967 graduate of the University of California's Hastings College of the Law.

Bruss died of complications from colon cancer, aged 67. He never married and left no immediate descendants.

== Career ==
Bruss was a real estate lawyer and broker and wrote seven columns a week, including his "Real Estate Mailbag" question-and-answer feature. He also explained what he believed were revealing developments in real estate law and taxes, and reviewed books with real estate themes.

His columns appeared weekly in The Washington Post, the Los Angeles Times and other major newspapers. He also published two monthly newsletters. His book The Smart Investor's Guide to Real Estate (1981) has appeared in multiple editions.

Tribune Media Services distributed his column for a quarter of a century. His writings have appeared in more than 175 newspapers and on many real estate Web sites. He taught real estate law classes at a community college, the College of San Mateo, (CSM) in San Mateo, California.

== Bibliography ==
Bruss authored and co-authored books about real estate.

- Smart Investors Guide: New 3rd Edition, Random House, 1984.
- Smart Investors Guide To Real Estate, Random House, 1986.
- California Real Estate Law, co-authored textbook with William H. Pivar, Dearborn Real Estate, 2002.
- Home Buying by the Experts: The Pros Make Your Dream Home a Reality, co-authored with Brian Yui, Lori Shaw-Cohen, etal., Quantum Leaves Publishing, 2005.
- Legal Aspects of Real Estate: California Real Estate Licensing, co-authored textbook with William H. Pivar, Kaplan Real Estate Education, 8th ed., 2015.
