= August 1919 =

Month of 1919

<<	August 1919					>>
Su	Mo	Tu	We	Th	Fr	Sa
					1	2
3	4	5	6	7	8	9
10	11	12	13	14	15	16
17	18	19	20	21	22	23
24	25	26	27	28	29	30
31

The following events occurred in August 1919:

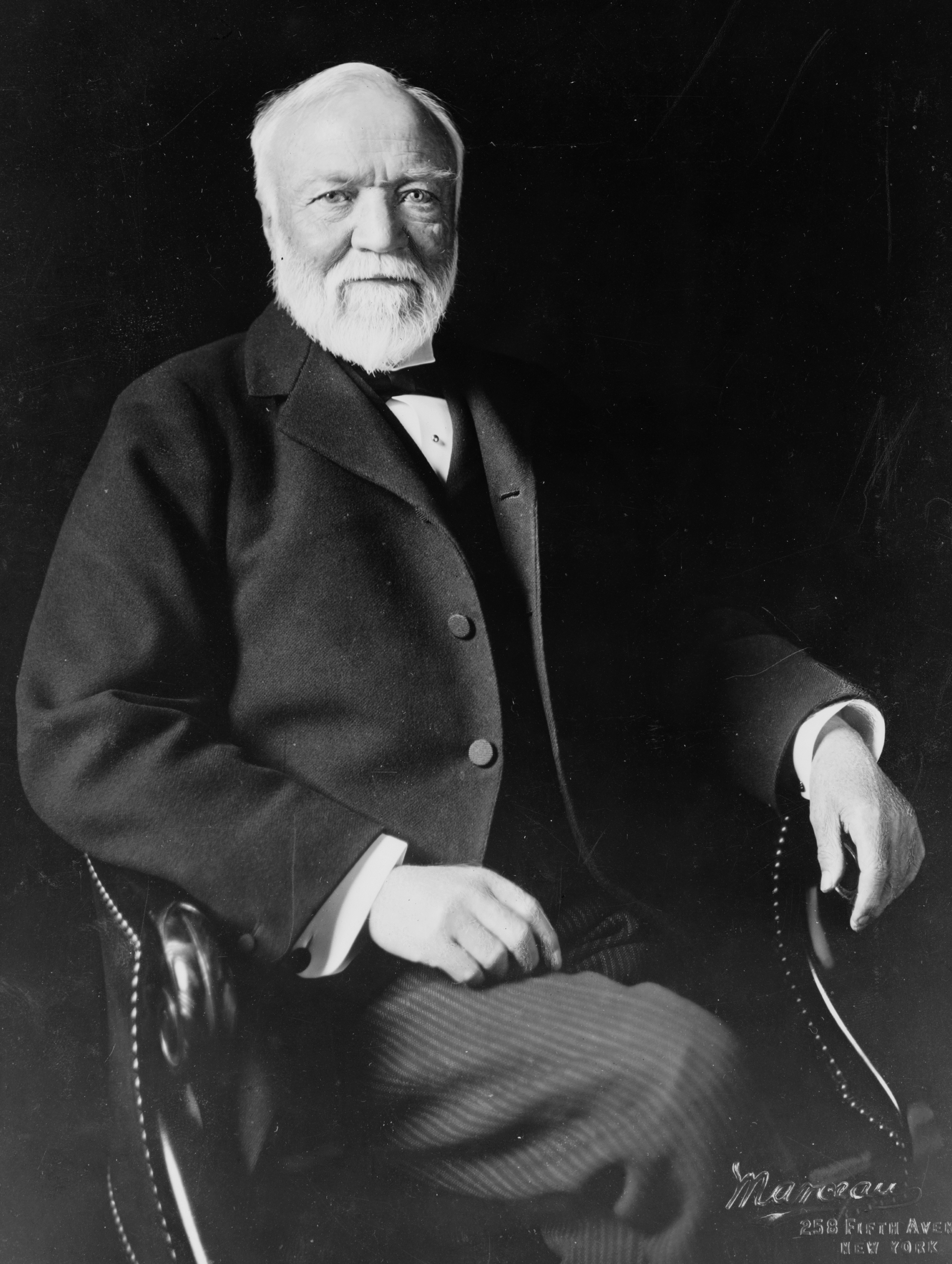
Andrew Carnegie, American industrialist and philanthropist, dies in Lenox, Massachusetts.

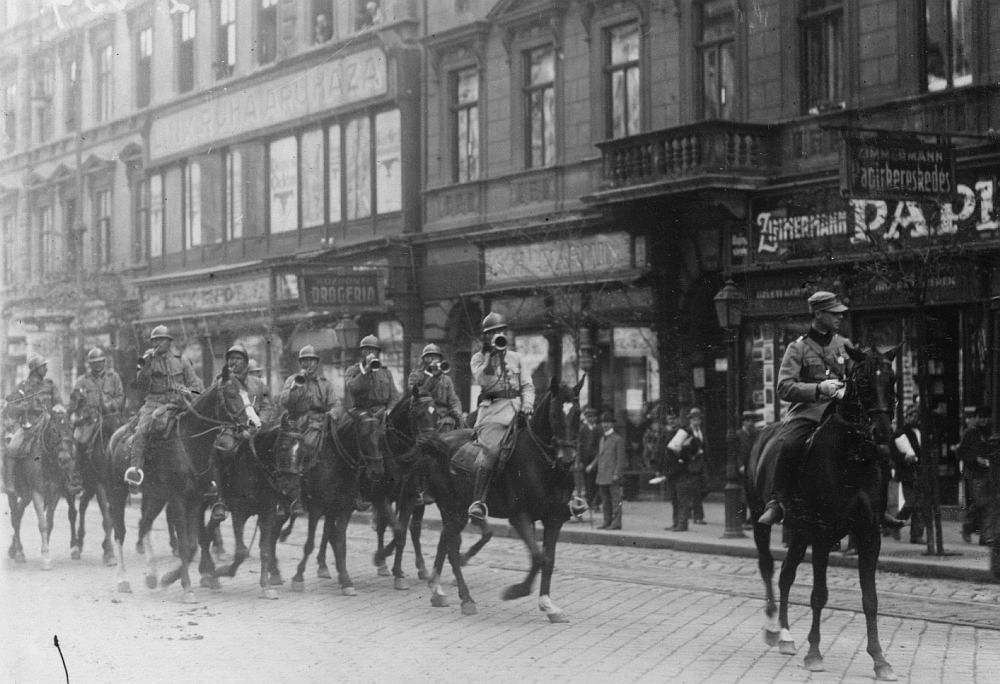
Romanian cavalry ride through Budapest at the end of the Hungarian–Romanian War.

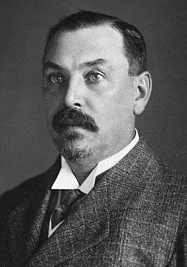
Louis Botha, Prime Minister of South Africa, dies at his home in Pretoria.

== August 1, 1919 (Friday) ==
A streetcar is overturned during a strike among streetcar workers in Los Angeles.

- The Hungarian Soviet Republic under the administration of Béla Kun collapsed after Romania invaded the country.
- The former Province of Posen of the German Empire was reformed as a voivodeship (local government administration) under Poland.
- The British government passed the Police Act to discourage police from joining unions that could take strike action, in light of a series of police strikes over the last two years. It eventually led to the formation of the Police Federation of England and Wales as the representative body of police forces in the United Kingdom.
- Street car workers in Los Angeles began to strike against Pacific Electric.
- United States Attorney General A. Mitchell Palmer appointed a young J. Edgar Hoover, then 24, to head the new General Intelligence Division of the Justice Department's Bureau of Investigation to specifically target radical groups in what became known as the Palmer Raids.
- The Weimar Republic established its official press department Rheinische Volkspflege under the Reich Central Office for Domestic Propaganda in Berlin. It was abolished in 1933 when the Nazi Party officially look power in Germany.
- Wharton Brook State Park was established in Wallingford, Connecticut.
- Several football and sports clubs were established in the following cities Lindau in Lindau, Germany, Voorwaarts in Paramaribo, Suriname, Hødd in Ulsteinvik, Norway, and Cibalia in Vinkovci, Croatia.
- Born:
  - Dave Creedon, Irish Gaelic football player, goalkeeper for the Glen Rovers, St. Nicholas and the Nemo Rangers from 1938 to 1955; in Blackpool, Cork, Ireland (d. 2007)
  - Ed Bruneteau, Canadian hockey player, right wing for the Detroit Red Wings from 1937 to 1954; in Saint Boniface, Manitoba, Canada (d. 2002)
  - Colin McCahon, New Zealand artist, best known for introducing modernism to New Zealand; in Timaru, New Zealand (d. 1987)
  - James Hill, British film director, known for films including Born Free and the children's television series Worzel Gummidge; in Eldwick, England (d. 1994)
  - Stanley Middleton, British writer, author of Holiday; in Bulwell, England (d. 2009)
- Died: Oscar Hammerstein I, 73, Polish-American composer, architect of Times Square in New York City, known his comic operas Santa Maria and Naughty Marietta, grandfather of Oscar Hammerstein II (b. 1847)

== August 2, 1919 (Saturday) ==
- The First Hungarian Republic was briefly re-established under the leadership of Gyula Peidl.
- Both Montana and Nebraska ratified the Nineteenth Amendment to the United States Constitution, which gave women the right to vote.
- A Caproni commercial plane crashed near Verona and killed all 14 passengers and crew on board, making it the first civil aviation disaster in Italy.
- Sports club Pfullendorf was established in Pfullendorf, Germany, where it became best known for its football program.
- Born: Carlo Savina, Italian composer and conductor, best known for his film scores for The Godfather, Amarcord, and The Bear; in Turin, Kingdom of Italy (present-day Italy) (d. 2002)
- Died: Otto Kissenberth, 26, German air force officer, commander of Jagdstaffel 23 for the Luftstreitkräfte in World War I; killed in a mountaineering accident (b. 1893)

== August 3, 1919 (Sunday) ==
- Four Royal Air Force Fairey seaplanes attacked three Bolshevik steamboats on Lake Onega, Russia during the British campaign against the Bolsheviks during the Russian Civil War, causing their crews to panic and allow Royal Navy submarines to capture them easily.
- The weekly newspaper World Freedom released its last issue in Budapest after 22 years of publication.

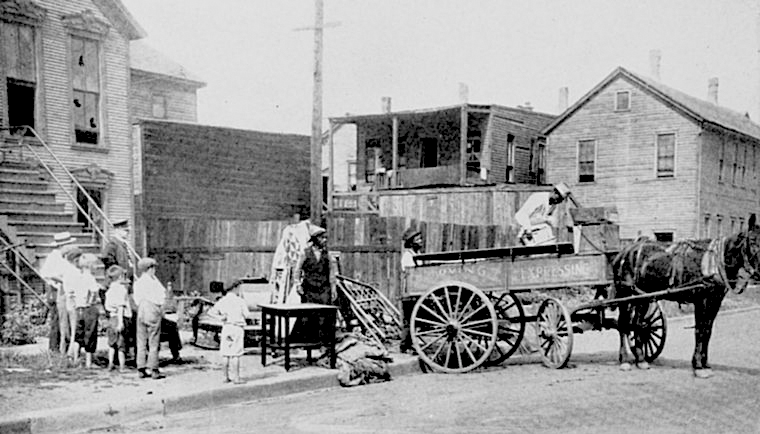
A family leaving their damaged home after race riot in Chicago left about 1,000 homeless.

- Red Summer – A race riot in Chicago formally ended. After a week of violence, it was reported 38 people died (23 African Americans and 15 whites), and another 537 were injured, with two-thirds of them being African American. African-American Patrolman John W. Simpson was the only policeman killed in the riot. Fires caused by the violence left about 1,000 residents, mostly African Americans, homeless.
- Football club América defeated Latino del Valle 3–0 to win the second Copa Centenario Batalla de Boyacá championship final in Cali, Colombia.
- Died: Samuel W. Fordyce, 79, American rail executive, president of the St. Louis, Arkansas and Texas Railway, St. Louis Southwestern Railway, and Kansas City Southern Railway from 1886 to 1900 (b. 1840)

== August 4, 1919 (Monday) ==
- The Erzurum Congress held by the Turkish National Movement in Erzurum, Turkey concluded with much of the groundwork laid out towards an independent Turkey. This included the completion of the National Pact that would be released by the General Assembly of the Ottoman Empire the following year to pave the way to independence.
- The Musée Rodin opened in the Parisian mansion Hôtel Biron to preserve and showcase the works of French sculptor Auguste Rodin.
- Born: Michel Déon, French writer, author of Les Poneys sauvages, Un taxi mauve and The Foundling Boy, recipient of the Legion of Honour; as Édouard Michel, in Paris, France (d. 2016)
- Died: Dave Gregory, 74, Australian cricketer, batsman for the New South Wales cricket team from 1866 to 1883, and the Australia national cricket team from 1877 to 1879 (b. 1845)

== August 5, 1919 (Tuesday) ==
- Born:
  - Seweryn Chajtman, Polish engineer, developed the Alternative Theory of Organization and Management (ATOM); in Warsaw, Republic of Poland (present-day Poland) (d. 2012)
  - Rosalind Hicks, British literary guardian and the only child of mystery author Agatha Christie; in Torquay, England (d. 2004)
- Died: Herbert Ward, 56, British explorer, member of the Emin Pasha Relief Expedition, recipient of the Croix de Guerre and Legion of Honour (b. 1863)

== August 6, 1919 (Wednesday) ==
- István Friedrich led a right-wing counterrevolution against the Gyula Peidl government in Hungary with the backing of the Royal Romanian Army.
- Antal Lehár arrives to Szombathely from Austria, takes command of counter-revolutionary forces in Western Hungary
- A street car workers strike against Pacific Electric in Los Angeles ended after five days of clashes between strikers and city police.
- Born:
  - Pauline Betz, American tennis player, five-time Grand Slam champion; in Dayton, Ohio, United States (d. 2011)
  - Leon Culberson, American baseball player, outfielder for the Boston Red Sox and Washington Senators from 1943 to 1948; as Delbert Leon Culberson, in Halls, Georgia, United States (d. 1989)
- Died: Ada Langworthy Collier, 75, American poet, best known for the narrative poem Lilith, The Legend of the First Woman (b. 1843)

== August 7, 1919 (Thursday) ==
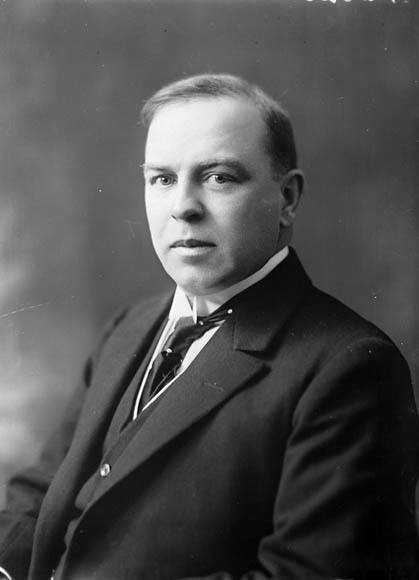
William Lyon Mackenzie King

- Archduke Joseph August of Austria declared himself regent of Hungary following a conservative overthrow of the left-central government the previous day.
- An American patrol of 40 men exchanged fire with a Red Army unit of 30 men at the village of Novo Litovoskaya, Siberia, Russia, killing or capturing all of the Red Army soldiers.
- The Actors' Equity Association went on strike over working conditions and pay at a majority of the theatrical companies in New York City, resulting in 12 playhouses closing on the first night and issuing $25,000 in ticket refunds.
- William Lyon Mackenzie King became the new leader of the Liberal Party of Canada after winning 52% of the final vote at the Liberal leadership convention in Ottawa, succeeding the late Wilfrid Laurier, who died in February.
- French pilot Charles Godefroy flew his Nieuport fighter under the arches of the Arc de Triomphe in Paris, the first time this has been accomplished. The stunt was unauthorized, but as it was a protest against pilots having had to parade on foot through the Champs-Élysées during the World War I victory celebration on Bastille Day (July 14), as well as in remembrance to fellow pilot Jean Navarre who died while practicing the same protest stunt. French authorities let Godefroy off with a warning.
- Captain Ernest Charles Hoy made the first aircraft crossing of the Rocky Mountains in Canada, flying from Vancouver to Calgary in a Curtis airplane in 16 hours and 42 minutes. Hoy made 1,400 kilometers (869 miles) with a total flight time of 12 hours 24 minutes.

== August 8, 1919 (Friday) ==
- The armistice signed between the United Kingdom and Afghanistan in Rawalpindi, British India ended the Third Anglo-Afghan War.
- Born:
  - Dino De Laurentiis, Italian film producer, known for his collaborations with filmmakers Carlo Ponti and Federico Fellini, and producing popular Hollywood films such as Serpico, Death Wish, Conan the Barbarian, and Hannibal; as Agostino De Laurentiis, in Torre Annunziata, Kingdom of Italy (present-day Italy) (d. 2010)
  - Samuel Pearson Goddard Jr., American politician, 12th Governor of Arizona; in Clayton, Missouri, United States (d. 2006)
  - Hau Pei-tsun, Chinese state leader, 13th Premier of the Republic of China; in Yancheng, Republic of China (present-day China) (d. 2020)

== August 9, 1919 (Saturday) ==
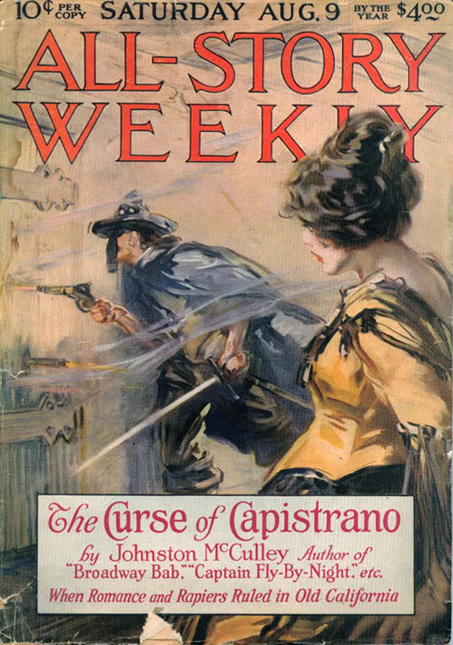
Zorro debuts in the novel The Curse of Capistrano.

- The General Conference of Seventh-day Adventists concluded their Bible Conference with the decision not to publicly disclose the transcripts of the conference, especially their conclusions on Seventh-day Adventist Church co-founder Ellen G. White and her writings. Details of the conference would not be disclosed to the public until 1975.
- The popular vigilante hero Zorro, created by American pulp writer Johnston McCulley, debuted in the serialized novel The Curse of Capistrano published in the pulp magazine All-Story Weekly from August 9 to September 6. McCulley meant to write a standalone story of the character, but the box office success of the 1920 film adaption The Mark of Zorro, starring Douglas Fairbanks as the masked vigilante hero, convinced McCulley to write more stories and make the character an icon in popular culture.
- Pelham Park and City Island Railway, a street rail service in The Bronx, New York City, ceased operations.
- The football club América was established in Rio Branco, Acre, Brazil.
- Born:
  - Joop den Uyl, Dutch state leader, 45th Prime Minister of the Netherlands; as Johannes Marten den Uijl, in Hilversum, Netherlands (d. 1987)
  - Tony Lovell, British air force officer, commander of the No. 1435 and No. 145 Squadrons during World War II, recipient of the Distinguished Service Order and Distinguished Flying Cross from both the United Kingdom and the United States; in British Ceylon (present-day Sri Lanka) (d. 1945, killed in a plane crash)
  - Leona Woods, American physicist, member of the research team to build the world's first nuclear reactor and later became involved in the Manhattan Project; in La Grange, Illinois, United States (d. 1986)
  - Ralph Houk, American baseball player and coach, catcher for the New York Yankees from 1947 to 1954, and manager from 1961 to 1973, six-time World Series champion; in Lawrence, Kansas, United States (d. 2010)
  - Fred Sanford, American baseball player, pitcher for the St. Louis Browns from 1943 to 1951; as John Frederick Sanford, in Salt Lake County, Utah, United States (d. 2011)
- Died:
  - Ernst Haeckel, 85, German biologist, promoter of the recapitulation theory, author of Art Forms in Nature (b. 1834)
  - Ruggero Leoncavallo, 62, Italian composer, known for his operas including Pagliacci and Mattinata (b. 1857)
  - Ralph Albert Blakelock, 71, American painter, member of the Tonalism movement (b. 1847)

== August 10, 1919 (Sunday) ==
- United States Army Border Air Patrol pilots Lieutenant Harold G. Peterson and Paul H. Davis got lost while on border patrol around Big Bend, Texas and crashed on the Mexican side of the border. They were apprehended by bandits for ransom soon after.
- A conference of the Poalei Zion political party in Gomel, Belarus resulted in the communist factions splintering away and forming their own political party.
- Axeman of New Orleans – New Orleans grocer Steve Boca was attacked in his home by an ax-wielding intruder. He survived despite a serious head injury but could not recall specific details about the attack.
- The rail Hakubi Line was extended to serve the mountainous Chūgoku region in western Japan.
- Born:
  - Grigory Sarkisovich Grigoryants, Soviet surgeon, best known for pioneering surgical and medical programs in Namangan, Uzbekistan; in Martuni Province, Soviet Turkestan (present-day Azerbaijan) (d. 1982)
  - Pepino Toledo, Guatemalan football player, forward and coach for the Municipal Club from 1938 to 1955 and the Guatemala national football team from 1943 to 1953; in Guatemala City, Guatemala (d. 1980)
- Died: Guy W. S. Castle, 40, American naval officer, commander of the USS Utah, recipient of the Medal of Honor for action during the United States occupation of Veracruz; committed suicide (b. 1879)

== August 11, 1919 (Monday) ==
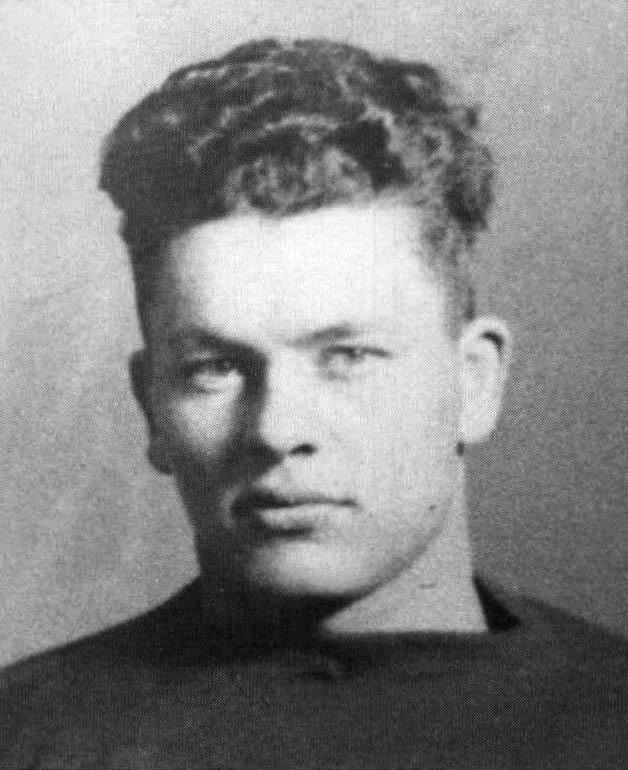
Curly Lambeau, founding football player and first coach of the Green Bay Packers

- The Weimar Constitution was ratified in Germany and signed by German president Friedrich Ebert. Women were granted the right to vote under the new constitution.
- Russian Civil War – White armies under the command of General Anton Denikin formed a new line connecting the towns of Hadiach, Kremenchuk, Znamianka, and Yelisavetgrad during the advance on Moscow.
- As the actors' strike went into the fourth day, the Producing Managers' Association released a press statement stating the Actors' Equity Association was an "enemy" to the theater community in preventing contract work was filing suit against the association. Equity members countered that existing contracts already recognized Equity members as legitimate and so were already violating contracts.
- American football player and coach Curly Lambeau and newspaper publisher George Whitney Calhoun founded the Green Bay Packers, the first National Football League team for Wisconsin.
- A Felixstowe Fury aircraft, also known as the Porte Super-Baby, crashed in Plymouth Sound off Plymouth, England on the eve of its planned flight to South Africa, killing one of its seven crew members.
- A Farman Goliath airliner flew eight passengers and a ton of supplies from Paris, to Koufa, Senegal, via Casablanca and Mogador in French Morocco, a total distance of 4,500 kilometers (2,795 miles).
- Died: Andrew Carnegie, 83, Scottish-American business leader and philanthropist, founder of the Carnegie Steel Company and Carnegie Corporation of New York, builder of landmarks Carnegie Hall in New York City and the Peace Palace in The Hague, author of "The Gospel of Wealth"; died of pneumonia (b. 1835)

== August 12, 1919 (Tuesday) ==
- Russian Civil War – Finding the numbers of his White Russian forces were not as large as the influx of volunteers to the Red Army in Moscow, General Anton Denikin issued a new directive calling on Third Army Corps to launch a general offensive in the west. This included a special force under command of General Nikolai Bredov to capture Kiev.
- The actors' strike spread to Chicago as actors there walked off productions. Soon after, actors joined the strike in Boston, Philadelphia, Washington, D.C., St. Louis, Pittsburgh and Atlantic City, New Jersey.
- The first British-controlled military units of local Iraqis and other ethnic groups, known at levies, began operations in the former Mesopotamia.
- Poland established a voivodeship (local government administration) at Toruń.
- Steel manufacturer Huta Ludwików was officially given license to operate by the Polish government in Kielce, Poland.
- The St Colman's Cathedral was consecrated in Cobh, Ireland.
- American singer Billy Murray recorded the World War I era song "And He'd Say, "Oo-La-La! Wee-Wee!"", written by Harry Ruby, through Victor Records, becoming one of the top 20 songs between October 1919 and January 1920.
- Born:
  - Margaret Burbidge, British-American astrophysicist, developed the optical spectrometer for the Hubble Space Telescope; as Eleanor Margaret Peachey, in Davenport, Greater Manchester, England (d. 2020)
  - Vikram Sarabhai, Indian physicist, co-founder of the Indian Space Research Organisation, recipient of the Shanti Swarup Bhatnagar Prize for Science and Technology; in Ahmedabad, British India (present-day India) (d. 1971)
  - Fred Hutchinson, American baseball player, pitcher for the Detroit Tigers from 1939 to 1953, manager for the Detroit Tigers, St. Louis Cardinals, and Cincinnati Reds from 1952 to 1964; in Seattle, United States (d. 1964)
- Died: Ernest Gimson, 54, English architect, leading figure in the Arts and Crafts movement, best known for housing designs for English villages in Kelmscott, Stoneywell, Whaplode, and Bedales School (b. 1864)

== August 13, 1919 (Wednesday) ==
- The United States Army Border Air Patrol began searching for missing pilots Harold G. Peterson and Paul H. Davis along the U.S.-Mexican border after their plane failed to return to base, not knowing that they had already been captured by bandits.
- Cigar manufacturer Waitt & Bond announced it was moving operations from Boston (due to the cigar makers strike) to Newark, New Jersey where cigars were made by machine. Other cigar makers followed suit and left Boston.
- The 6th Machine Gun Battalion of the U.S. Marines was disbanded at Quantico, Virginia.
- The American Expeditionary Forces closed down their military hospitals in Paris, when Hospital No. 57 discharged its last of the over 8,500 patients it treated since September 1918.
- The first major German gay magazine Die Freundschaft began publication and became one of the signature liberal publications of the Weimer era.
- The sports club Leksand was established in Leksand, Sweden. It started with bandy and skiing programs, and added football in 1920 and ice hockey in 1938.
- Born:
  - George Shearing, British-American jazz musician and composer, known for jazz hits including "Lullaby of Birdland"; in Battersea, England (d. 2011)
  - Jim Mooney, American comic book artist, best known for his work on Supergirl for DC Comics and Spider-Man for Marvel Comics; in New York City, United States (d. 2008)
  - Rex Humbard, religious leader, known for the evangelical show Cathedral of Tomorrow; as Alpha Rex Emmanuel Humbard, in Little Rock, Arkansas, United States (d. 2007)
  - Johannes Gouws, South African air force officer, member of the 40 Squadron during World War II, member of the escape team from German POW camp Stalag Luft III, in Bultfontein, Union of South Africa (present-day South Africa) (d. 1944, executed)

== August 14, 1919 (Thursday) ==
- Russian Civil War – The Red Army under command of Vladimir Yegoryev launched a counter offensive against the White Army of 185,000 men under command of Anton Denikin with a force of 144,000 Bolshevik troops.
- Poland established voivodeships (local government administrations) at Białystok, Kielce, Łódź, Lublin, and Warsaw.
- Football clubs were established in the following cities: Botafogo in Salvador, Bahia, Brazil, Olímpico in Blumenau, Brazil as Sociedade Desportiva Blumenauense, and Progrès Niederkorn in Niederkorn, Luxembourg.
- Born: Isaac C. Kidd Jr., American naval officer, Supreme Allied Commander of the NATO Atlantic Fleet from 1975 to 1978, recipient of the Defense Distinguished Service Medal, Navy Distinguished Service Medal, and Legion of Merit, son of Isaac C. Kidd; in Cleveland, United States (d. 1999)

== August 15, 1919 (Friday) ==
- Silesian Uprisings – German border guards shot 10 ethnic Poles dead during a labor dispute at a mine near Mysłowice, Upper Silesia, which was still under German occupation at the time. The massacre led to the first uprising in an effort to force Germany to release the region to Poland.
- The fourth government of Finland under the Kaarlo Castrén administration was dissolved and replaced by the fifth cabinet under Juho Vennola.
- The British government enacted the Pre-War Practices Act, which ensured returning war veterans were rehired to their jobs before they enlisted in World War I.
- France reported that 60 percent of its aviators were killed or wounded during World War I.
- The United States Army Air Service established 2nd Operations Group at Luke Field, Hawaii.
- Indian Catholic Geevarghese Ivanios, future co-founder of the Syro-Malankara Catholic Church in India, established The Bethany Ashram in Calcutta.
- Born: Dina Wadia, Indian socialite, daughter of Muhammad Ali Jinnah; as Dina Jinnah, in London, England (d. 2017)

== August 16, 1919 (Saturday) ==
- A parade of actors supporting the actors' strike was held in New York City to showcase the first in a series of benefit, as memberships to the Actors' Equity Association increased from 4,200 to 6000. The benefit shows played to near full houses every night.
- Died:
  - Alexander Izvolsky, 63, Russian diplomat, Foreign Minister of the Russian Empire from 1906 to 1910, architect of the Anglo-Russian Convention (b. 1856)
  - Frederick Layton, 92, American business leader and philanthropist, best known for developing the meat industry in Milwaukee and for his art collection that was eventually donated to the Milwaukee Art Museum (b. 1827)

== August 17, 1919 (Sunday) ==
- The Bulgarian Agrarian National Union won the majority of the seats in elections for the parliament in Bulgaria, with voter turnout at 54.5%.
- The 8th Cavalry Regiment posted to Candelaria, Texas received notice from Mexican bandit leader Jesus Renteria stating his gang was holding downed United States Army Border Air Patrol pilots Harold Peterson and Paul Davis for a ransom of $15,000 ($278,600 in 2025).
- Born: Georgia Gibbs, American singer, best known for her work on radio shows Your Hit Parade and Camel Caravan during the 1930s and 1940s, and The Ed Sullivan Show; as Frieda Lipschitz, in Worcester, Massachusetts, United States (d. 2006)

== August 18, 1919 (Monday) ==
- Russian Civil War – The 12th Red Army was surrounded by White Russian forces in Ukraine.
- Hungarian–Romanian War – Romania occupies Veszprém and Győr
- Royal Air Force aircraft based at Biorko, Finland, under the command of squadron leader Grahame Donald, bombed and strafed the Russian Soviet naval base at Kronstadt, Russia while Royal Navy night torpedo boats attacked Russian warships in port as part of the Baltic campaign of the Russian Civil War. Russian ship losses included the battlecruiser Pamiat Azova.
- Representatives from seven American labor groups agreed to establish the Labor Party of the United States and to hold its first convention in November.
- The U.S. government paid the $15,000 ransom to Mexican bandit leader Jesus Renteria, with Captain Leonard F. Matlack 8th Cavalry Regiment in the exchange to release captured pilots Harold Peterson and Paul Davis. He was able to secure the release of Peterson for half of the ransom but while en route to retrieve Davis learned of a plan to ambush and kill him and Davis after the other half of the ransom was paid. Matlack and Davis were able to escape before arriving at the ambush site and made it back over the border. Peterson and Davis later testified Renteria had captured them on the U.S. side of the border days earlier.
- The 103rd Aero Squadron of the United States Army Air Service was disbanded.
- Print manufacturer Dynic Corporation was established in Kyoto as the Nippon Cloth Industry Company.
- The Danforth Music Hall opened to the public in Toronto. It was designated under the Ontario Heritage Act in 1985.
- Born: Wally Hickel, American politician, second Governor of Alaska; in Ellinwood, Kansas, United States (d. 2010)
- Died: Joseph E. Seagram, 78, Canadian business leader, founder of Seagram (b. 1841)

== August 19, 1919 (Tuesday) ==
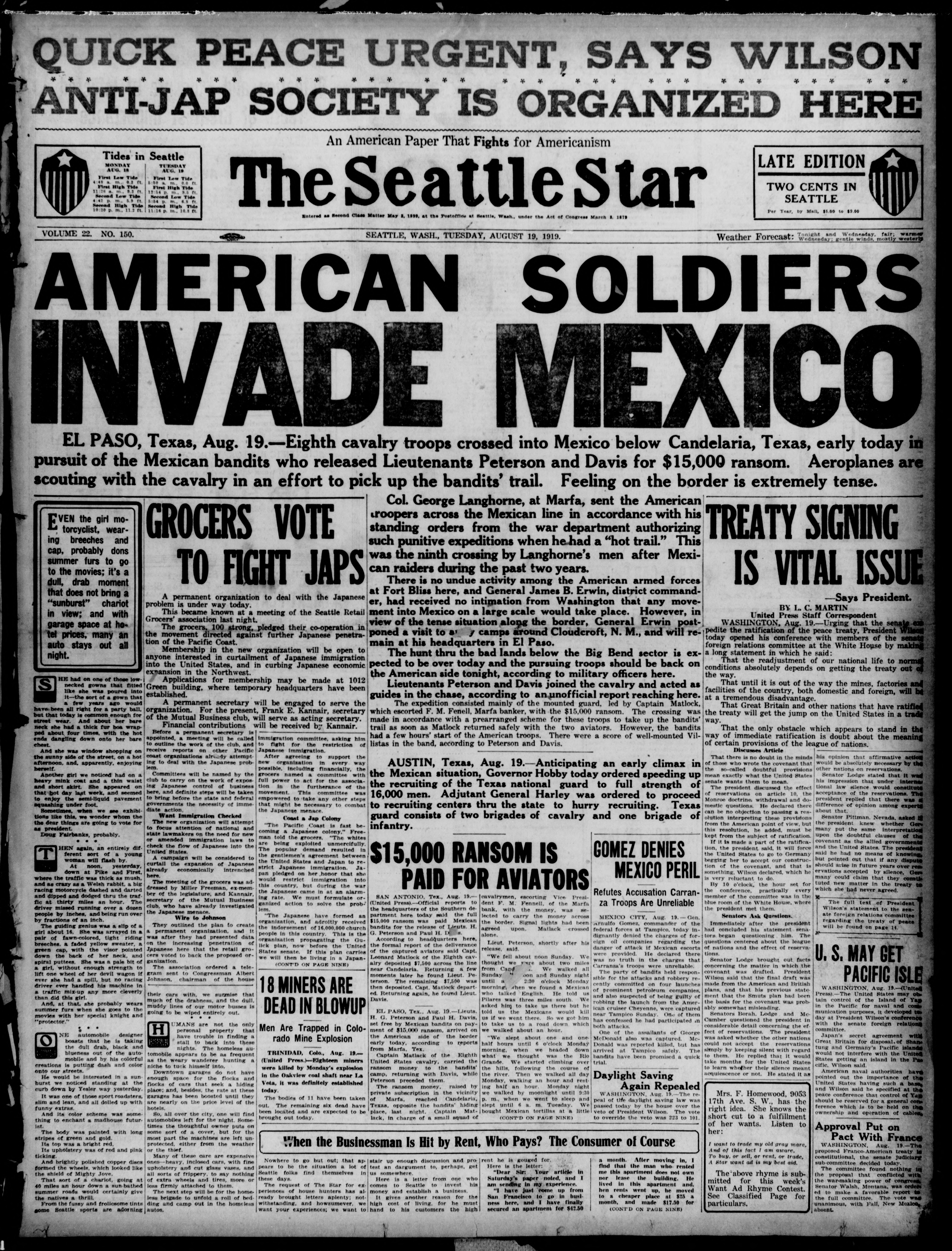
Front Cover of The Seattle Star - August 19, 1919, reporting on U.S. Army efforts to apprehend bandits who tried to kidnap and ranson two American airmen who crashlanded in Mexico.

- Afghanistan gained independence from the United Kingdom through a referendum which included giving women the right to vote for sovereignty.
- The Third Szeged Counter-government dissolves itself
- The 8th Cavalry Regiment led by Capt. Leonard F. Matlack crossed the U.S-Mexican border to capture Jesus Renteria and his gang for abducting and attempting to murder American servicemen. Four suspect bandits were killed in a gun fight at a blockhouse near the border and a plane strafed bandits on horseback with machine gun fire, killing another man believed to be Renteria himself.
- The United States Armed Forces readopted the white star insignia centered in a blue circle with a red disc as its official national insignia. The marking was temporarily not used during World War I for fear it would be mistaken for the German insignia. It remained in use until June 1, 1942.
- The Southern Syncopated Orchestra performed the first jazz concert for a British monarch, Edward, Prince of Wales, in London. The concert earned an enthusiastic review by music critic Ernest Ansermet, including the performance of clarinetist Sidney Bechet, making it one of the first serious pieces of jazz criticism.
- Born:
  - Malcolm Forbes, American publisher, second publisher of Forbes magazine after his father B. C. Forbes; in New York City, United States (d. 1990)
  - Reba Z. Whittle, American army medical officer, member of the United States Army Nurse Corps during World War II, only American female prisoner of war in the European Theatre, recipient of the Air Medal; in Rocksprings, Texas, United States (d. 1981)

== August 20, 1919 (Wednesday) ==
- The football club Tolentino was established in Tolentino, Italy.
- Born:
  - Adamantios Androutsopoulos, Greek state leader, last Prime Minister of Greece for the Glücksburg dynasty; in Messenia, Kingdom of Greece (present-day Greece) (d. 2000)
  - Noni Jabavu, South African writer, first African editor of The Strand Magazine, author of Drawn in Colour and Ochre People; as Helen Nontando Jabavu, in Middledrift, Eastern Cape, Union of South Africa (present-day South Africa) (d. 2008)
  - Walter Bernstein, American screenwriter, known for his collaboration with director Martin Ritt on Paris Blues and The Front; in New York City, United States (d. 2021)
  - Roddie Edmonds, American soldier, member of the 106th Infantry Division, recipient of the Righteous Among the Nations title for protecting 200 Jewish POWs from persecution during World War II; in South Knoxville, Tennessee, United States (d. 1985)

== August 21, 1919 (Thursday) ==
- Friedrich Ebert was sworn in as the first President of Germany.
- Red Summer – A mob of eight to ten white men attacked John Shillady, executive secretary for the NAACP, in broad daylight in downtown Austin, Texas.
- Hungarian–Romanian War – Romania raids Mosonmagyaróvár
- The Committee on Public Information, an agency aimed to support the United States involvement in World War I, was abolished and its records handed over to the Council of National Defense.
- The village of Forestburg, Alberta was incorporated.
- Born:
  - Dalmiro Finol, Venezuelan baseball player, first baseman for the Leones del Caracas from 1946 to 1954; in Barrancas, Venezuela (d. 1994)
  - Marcel Lambert, Canadian politician, 25th Speaker of the House of Commons of Canada; in Edmonton, Canada (d. 2000)
- Died: Laurence Doherty, 43, British tennis player, six-time Grand Slam champion, two-time gold medalist at the 1900 Summer Olympics (b. 1875)

== August 22, 1919 (Friday) ==
- Born: Leon Lazarus, American publisher, editor of Magazine Management, publisher of Timely Comics and Atlas Comics; in New York City, United States (d. 2008)

== August 23, 1919 (Saturday) ==
- Archduke Joseph August of Austria was forced to resign as regent of Hungary when it became obvious the Allies would not recognize him as state leader. He appointed István Friedrich as Prime Minister of Hungary, leading to the creation of the Hungarian Republic.
- The 8th Cavalry Regiment was ordered to call off the search for the remaining bandits and return to the United States following protests by the Mexican government for American forces invading Mexican territory.
- Polish president Józef Piłsudski observed the first aircraft built in a free Poland crash during a public ceremonial flight due to faulty bracing wires, killing the aircraft's designer, Karol Słowik, along with another crew member.
- Died: Augustus George Vernon Harcourt, 84, American chemist, leading developer of chemical kinetics (b. 1834)

== August 24, 1919 (Sunday) ==
- Russian Civil War – White Russian armies captured Odessa.
- Social Democratic Party of Hungary re-established by Károly Peyer.
- Born:
  - Carlos Julio Arosemena Monroy, Ecuadoran state leader, 31st President of Ecuador; in Guayaquil, Ecuador (d. 2004)
  - Benny Moré, Cuban singer, promoter of popular Cuban music genres such as bolero and mambo, band leader of "Banda Gigante"; as Bartolomé Maximiliano Moré Gutiérrez, in Lajas, Cuba (d. 1963)
- Died: Friedrich Naumann, 59, German politician, co-founder of Deutscher Werkbund and the German Democratic Party, one of the authors of the Weimar Constitution (b. 1860)

== August 25, 1919 (Monday) ==
- Voters in Peru approved a new constitution following a referendum.
- The first regularly scheduled airline service between London and Paris began, with the British Aircraft Transport and Travel company flying an Airco airplane between Hounslow Heath Aerodrome and Le Bourget Airport.
- Born:
  - George Wallace, American politician, 45th Governor of Alabama, known for his staunch segregationist views; in Clio, Alabama, United States (d. 1998)
  - Matt Urban, American army officer, commander of the 60th Infantry Regiment during World War II, recipient of the Medal of Honor and Croix de Guerre; in Buffalo, New York, United States (d. 1995)

== August 26, 1919 (Tuesday) ==
- Silesian Uprisings – Some 21,000 German troops were involved in putting down an uprising among ethnic Poles in Upper Silesia. Some 2,500 Poles were executed during the crackdown and another 9,000 sought refuge in neighboring Poland. The Allies restored order and allowed many refugees to return, but there would be more uprisings in the following years before the region became independent and joined Poland.
- The 39th stage of the U.S. National Championships for men was held at the West Side Tennis Club in New York City.

== August 27, 1919 (Wednesday) ==
- Louis Botha, first Prime Minister of South Africa, died from complications of influenza while in office.
- Harry Holland became leader of the New Zealand Labour Party following a close win over James McCombs during the party's leadership convention.
- The United States Army Air Service established a training air base at Eagle Pass, Texas. It became a municipal airport in 1945 and operated until its closure in 1996.
- Born: Jack Dormand, British politician, chair of the Parliamentary Labour Party from 1981 to 1987, MP for Easington from 1970 to 1987; in Haswell, County Durham, England (d. 2003)

== August 28, 1919 (Thursday) ==
- An American commission submitted a report to U.S. President Woodrow Wilson on Middle Eastern states formally under control of the Ottoman Empire, concluding the area was not yet ready for self-government, that supporting the creation of a Jewish State would be in conflict with the Balfour Declaration, and that Turkey may not respect the sovereignty of Armenia due to ongoing impacts from the Armenian genocide.
- Hungarian–Romanian War – Romania raids Kapuvár
- The 12th Australian Light Horse Regiment was disbanded in Sydney.
- The football club Bento Gonçalves was established in Bento Gonçalves, Rio Grande do Sul, Brazil.
- Born:
  - Godfrey Hounsfield, English engineer, recipient of the Nobel Prize in Physiology or Medicine for development of the CT scan; in Nottinghamshire, England (d. 2004)
  - Cecil Clothier, British public servant, first chairperson of the British Police Complaints Authority; in Liverpool, England (d. 2010)
- Died: Adolf Schmal, 46, Austrian cyclist, gold and bronze medalist in the 1896 Summer Olympics (b. 1872)

== August 29, 1919 (Friday) ==
- The National Library of Latvia was established in Riga.
- Lon Chaney debuted his signature make-up and character actor work in The Miracle Man. It would be the top-grossing film of the year, with $3 million at the box office.
- The Avro floatplane made its first test flight prior to being entered into the Schneider Cup in September, where it failed to complete the competition due to poor weather conditions.
- Born:
  - Orval Grove, American baseball player, pitcher for the Chicago White Sox from 1940 to 1949; in West Mineral, Kansas, United States (d. 1992)
  - Sono Osato, American ballet dancer, known for her collaborations with the Ballets Russes de Monte-Carlo and American Ballet Theatre; in Omaha, Nebraska, United States (d. 2018)

== August 30, 1919 (Saturday) ==
- Red Summer – A white mob of 5,000 people broke into the Knox County jail in Knoxville, Tennessee in an attempt to find and lynch a biracial man in custody for the alleged murder of a white woman, but discovered police had already moved the prisoner. As retaliation, the mob freed all white prisoners, ransacked the jail and then marched into black communities to loot and burn. The Tennessee National Guard was called in but it took two days to restore order. Newspapers reported at least two deaths, but some estimates said as many as 30 to 40 black citizens may have died in the race riot.
- After a three-way splintering of the Socialist Party of America, the leadership of the remaining 30,000 members of the right wing the party continued their national convention in Chicago.
- The cigar makers strike in Boston ended with a new agreement between the cigar manufacturers and cigar makers.
- The Christian National Party of Hungary was established by Pál Teleki, although he was taking direction from István Friedrich, who had become Prime Minister of Hungary earlier that month.
- The English Football League resumed in the United Kingdom, four years after it was abandoned due to the war.
- Born:
  - Maurice Hilleman, American microbiologist, developer of over 40 vaccines including for measles, mumps, chickenpox, pneumonia, and Hepatitis A and Hepatitis B, recipient of the National Medal of Science; in Miles City, Montana, United States (d. 2005)
  - Kitty Wells, American country music singer, known for hit songs including "It Wasn't God Who Made Honky Tonk Angels" and "Heartbreak U.S.A.", recipient of the Grammy Lifetime Achievement Award; as Ellen Muriel Deason, in Nashville, Tennessee, United States (d. 2012)
  - Joachim Rønneberg, Norwegian resistance leader, commander of Norwegian Independent Company 1 during World War II, recipient of the Distinguished Service Order and War Cross; in Ålesund, Norway (d. 2018)
  - Wolfgang Wagner, German opera director, best known for the Bayreuth Festival; in Wahnfried, Bayreuth, Weimar Republic (present-day Germany) (d. 2010)

== August 31, 1919 (Sunday) ==
- Russian Civil War – White Russian forces captured Kiev.
- The Communist Labor Party of America was established when 10,000 native-born members of the left wing of the Socialist Party of America split up from the rest of the organization during the Chicago convention.
- The American Expeditionary Forces disbanded their combat support units in France.
- The British tabloid The Sunday Sun began publication in Newcastle upon Tyne, England.
- Born:
  - Amrita Pritam, Indian writer, first prominent women poet in Punjabi and Hindi, known for poems including "Ajj Aakhaan Waris Shah Nu (I Say Unto Waris Shah)" and novels including Pinjar, recipient of the Padma Shri; as Amrit Kaur, in Gujranwala, British India (present-day Pakistan) (d. 2005)
  - Raymond Westerling, Dutch army officer, commander with the Royal Netherlands East Indies Army during the Indonesian National Revolution; in Istanbul, Ottoman Empire (present-day Turkey) (d. 1987)
