= September 1919 =

Month of 1919

<<	September 1919					>>
Su	Mo	Tu	We	Th	Fr	Sa
	1	2	3	4	5	6
7	8	9	10	11	12	13
14	15	16	17	18	19	20
21	22	23	24	25	26	27
28	29	30

The following events occurred in September 1919:

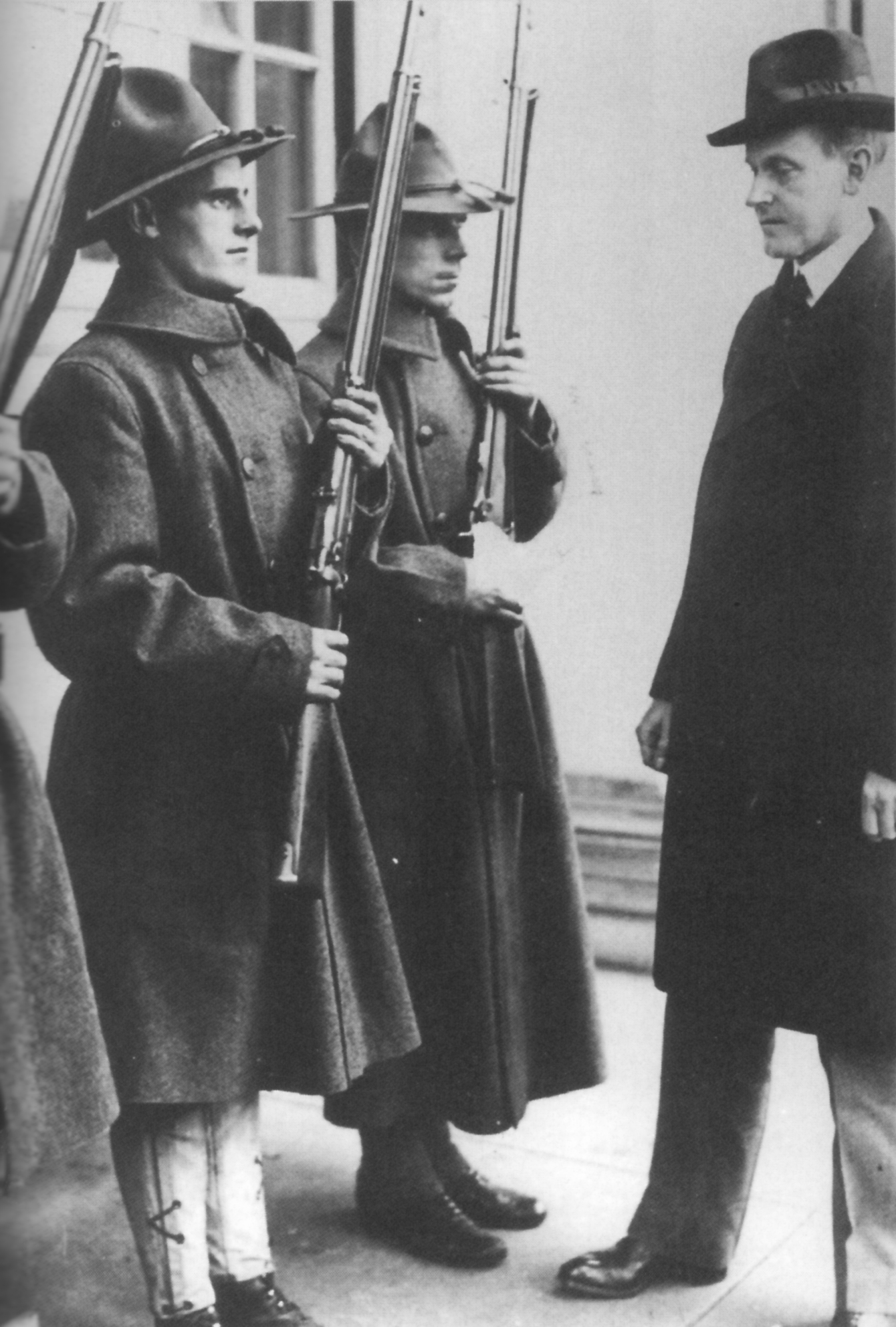
Governor of Massachusetts Calvin Coolidge inspects the militia during the Boston police strike.

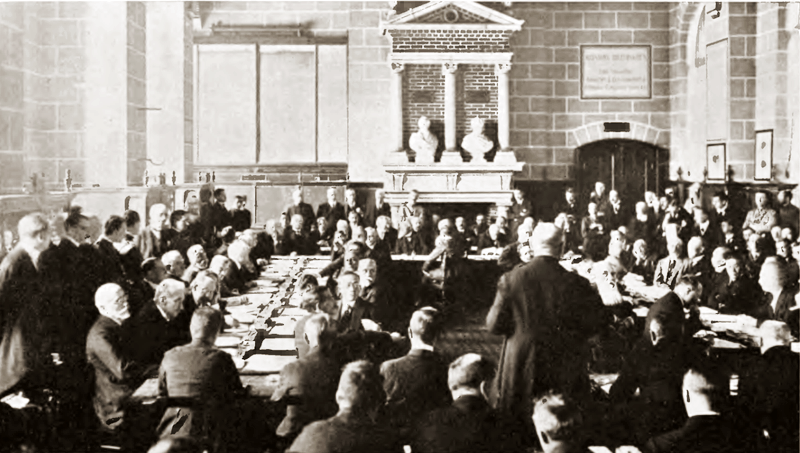
Austrian chancellor Karl Renner addresses the delegates during the signing of the Treaty of Saint-Germain-en-Laye that formally dissolved the Austrian Empire and established the First Austrian Republic.

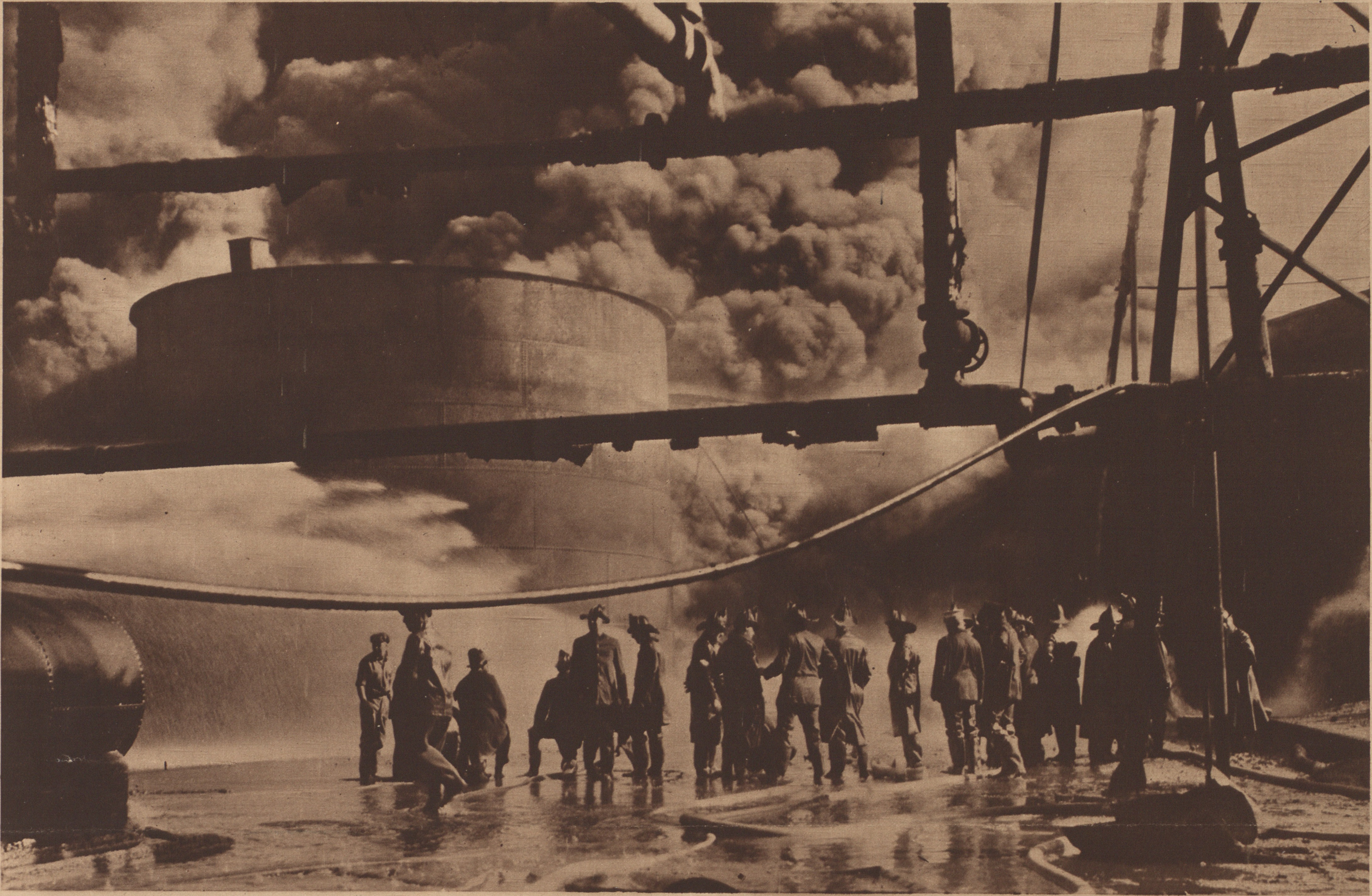
A massive fire at an oil refinery in Brooklyn sends over 300 to hospital.

== September 1, 1919 (Monday) ==
- American communist leaders C. E. Ruthenberg and Louis C. Fraina formed the Communist Party of America after splintering from the Socialist Labor Party of America during the national convention in Chicago.
- Edward, Prince of Wales opened the third parliamentary session of the 13th Canadian Parliament.
- The 59th Infantry Division of the British Army was disbanded along with its mortar brigade.
- The Royal Air Force disbanded air group No. 15.
- The Baku State University was established in Baku, Azerbaijan.
- The Forestry Commission was established in the United Kingdom.
- Russian filmmaker Vladimir Gardin founded the Moscow Film School (now the Gerasimov Institute of Cinematography), which continues to be the longest-running active film school in the world.
- United Artists released their first film, His Majesty, the American starring Douglas Fairbanks and directed by Joseph Henabery.
- New subway stations were added to the BMT Broadway Line in New York City, including Fifth Avenue and Lexington Avenue.
- The Norwegian newspaper Agder Tidend began publishing in Kristiansand, Norway.
- Sports club Vidar was established in Oslo, where it is known for its track and field, triathlon and archery programs.
- Born:
  - Gladys Davis, Canadian baseball player, shortstop and outfielder of the All-American Girls Professional Baseball League from 1943 to 1946; as Gladys Victoria Anthony, in Toronto, Canada (d. 1991)
  - Mahmud Ali, Pakistani politician, founder of the Ganatantri Dal political party; in Sunamganj, British India (present-day Bangladesh) (d. 2006)

== September 2, 1919 (Tuesday) ==
- A tropical cyclone formed east of Guadeloupe in the Atlantic Ocean.
- Stagehands with theatrical companies across the United States joined in support of the actors' strike.
- The Danish-Baltic Auxiliary Corps, a military volunteer unit to assist Estonia and Latvia achieve independence from Russia, was officially disbanded.
- Born: Marge Champion, American actress and choreographer, known for her collaboration with husband Gower Champion on film musicals including Mr. Music and Show Boat, and her work on the 1970s television miniseries The Awakening Land; as Marjorie Celeste Belcher, in Los Angeles, United States (d. 2020)

== September 3, 1919 (Wednesday) ==
- Jan Smuts became the second Prime Minister of South Africa.
- Axeman of New Orleans – Nineteen-year old Sarah Laumann was attacked while she slept in her home. Neighbors discovered her lying unconscious on her bed with head injuries and a bloody ax was found in front of her house. Laumann recovered but could not recall any details from the attack.
- The German Social Democratic Workers' Party in the Czechoslovak Republic was established during a political convention in Teplice, Czechoslovakia.
- American economist Roger Babson founded a private business school later referred to as Babson College in Wellesley, Massachusetts.

== September 4, 1919 (Thursday) ==
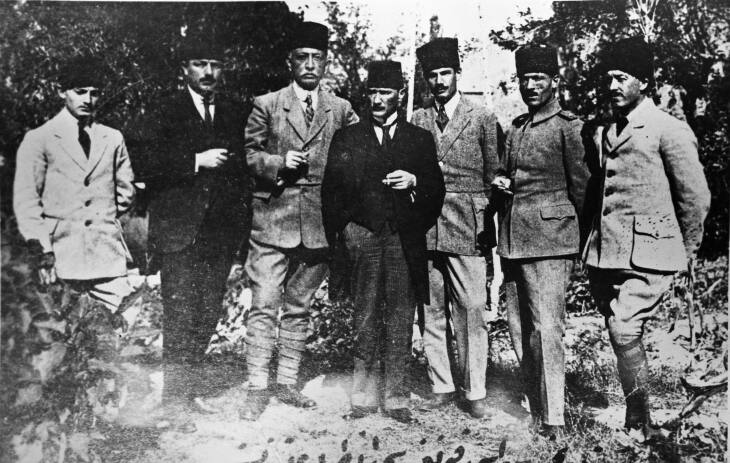
Prominent Turkish nationalists at the Sivas Congress.

- The Turkish National Movement assembled in Sivas, Turkey to discuss formation of a future Turkish government following the dissolution of the Ottoman Empire.
- Bill Johnston defeated Bill Tilden 6–4, 6–4, 6–3 in the men's singles at the U.S. National Championships while Norman Brookes and Gerald Patterson defeated Tilden and Vincent Richards 8–6, 6–3, 4–6, 4–6, 6–2 in the men's doubles.
- The football club Kapfenberger SV was established in Kapfenberg, Austria.
- Born:
  - Howard Morris, American actor, best known for the role of Ernest T. Bass in the 1960s television comedy The Andy Griffith Show; in New York City, United States (d. 2005)
  - Émile Bouchard, Canadian hockey player, defenceman for the Montreal Canadiens from 1941 to 1956, four-time Stanley Cup champion; as Joseph Émile Alcide Bouchard, in Montreal, Canada (d. 2012)
  - Phil Terranova, American boxer, World Featherweight Champion in 1943; in New York City, United States (d. 2000)

== September 5, 1919 (Friday) ==
- Born: Tom Jordan (baseball), American baseball player who was catcher for the Chicago White Sox, Cleveland Indians and St. Louis Browns
- Died: Joseph Ivess, 75, Irish-New Zealand politician, member of the New Zealand House of Representatives for Wakanui from 1882 to 1887 (b. 1844)

== September 6, 1919 (Saturday) ==
- A United States Army motor convoy arrived in San Francisco to complete a nearly two-month continental journey by vehicle across the United States. Information collected during the trek contributed to the development of the U.S. Highway System.
- The actors' strike ended with the Producing Managers' Association signing a new basic agreement with the Actors' Equity Association and dropping all lawsuits.
- The Socialist Party of Transylvania was established in Sibiu, Romania.
- The George-Étienne Cartier Monument, sculpted by George William Hill, was unveiled in Mount Royal, Montreal.
- Born: Lee Archer, American air force officer, commander of the 332d Fighter Group, also known as the Tuskegee Airmen, during World War II, recipient of the Distinguished Flying Cross, nine Air Medals, and two Commendation Medals; in Yonkers, New York, United States (d. 2010)
- Died: Lord Charles Beresford, 73, British naval officer, recipient of the Victoria Cross for action during the Anglo-Zulu War, Order of the Bath and Royal Victorian Order (b. 1846)

== September 7, 1919 (Sunday) ==
- The first Waldorf school opened in Stuttgart, Germany with 256 students enrolled. The school's curriculum was based on anthroposophy developed by German philosopher Rudolf Steiner. The independent school has grown to its present size of 1,150 schools in 75 countries.
- Fairmount Bagel, the first bagel bakery in Montreal, opened in the Mile End neighbourhood of the Plateau-Mont-Royal borough on Saint-Laurent Boulevard. It moved to its current location on 74 Fairmount Avenue West in 1949.
- Popular comic duo Roscoe Arbuckle and Buster Keaton released their next film hit Back Stage through Paramount Pictures.
- Born:
  - Louise Bennett-Coverley, Jamaican poet, promoter of Jamaican Patois; in Kingston, Jamaica (d. 2006)
  - Johanna von Trapp, sixth child of Georg von Trapp and member of the Trapp Family Singers; in Zell am See, Austria (d. 1994)

== September 8, 1919 (Monday) ==
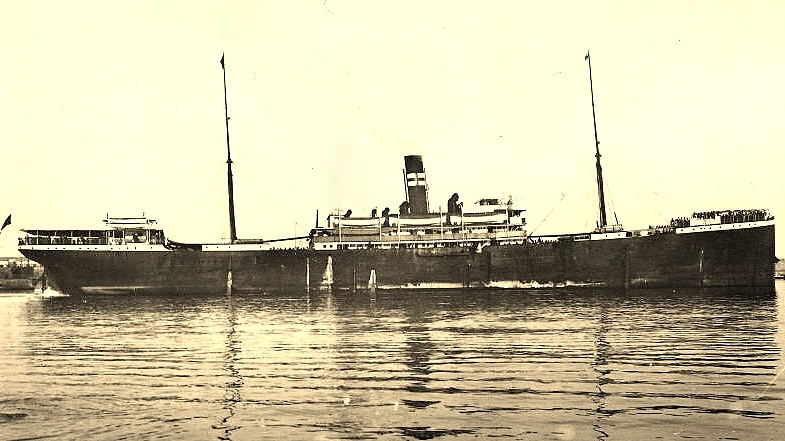
SS Valbanera

- A hurricane struck the Caribbean, resulting in the sinking of Spanish steamship Valbanera with the loss of all 488 passengers and crew on-board off Cuba, while British steamer Corydon ran aground and sank off The Bahamas with 27 crew killed.
- Minnesota ratified the Nineteenth Amendment to the United States Constitution which gave voting rights to women.
- British soldiers rioted in Fermoy, Ireland following an inquest on the previous death of a British soldier that failed to produce any murder charges.
- Chemical manufacturer Daicel was established in Osaka from a merger of eight regional companies.
- Born:
  - Manfred Meurer, German air force officer, commander of Nachtjagdgeschwader 1 for the Luftwaffe during World War II, recipient of the Knight's Cross of the Iron Cross; in Hamburg, Weimar Republic (present-day Germany) (d. 1944, killed in action)
  - Lyudmila Tselikovskaya, Russian actress, known for her film roles including Ivan the Terrible, recipient of the People's Artist; in Astrakhan, Russian SFSR (present-day Russia) (d. 1992)
  - Maria Lassnig, Austrian painter, member of the Hundsgruppe, first female recipient of the Grand Austrian State Prize and the Austrian Decoration for Science and Art; in Kappel am Krappfeld, Austria (d. 2014)

== September 9, 1919 (Tuesday) ==
- The majority of the 1,500 officers with the Boston Police Department went on strike after Police Commissioner Edwin Upton Curtis denied them the right to form a union.
- John Howatt Bell became Premier of Prince Edward Island, replacing Aubin-Edmond Arsenault following his defeat by Bell in provincial elections held in July.
- Born:
  - Barbara Fiske Calhoun, American comic book artist, pioneer female artist during the Golden Age of Comic Books, co-founder of the Quarry Hill Creative Center; as Isabelle Daniel Hall, in Tucson, Arizona, United States (d. 2014)
  - John Ljunggren, Swedish speed walker, gold medalist at the 1948 Summer Olympics, bronze medalist at the 1956 Summer Olympics, and silver medalist at the 1960 Summer Olympics; in Forsheda, Sweden (d. 2000)
- Died: John Mitchell, 49, American labor leader, president of the United Mine Workers of America from 1898 to 1908; died of pneumonia (b. 1870)

== September 10, 1919 (Wednesday) ==
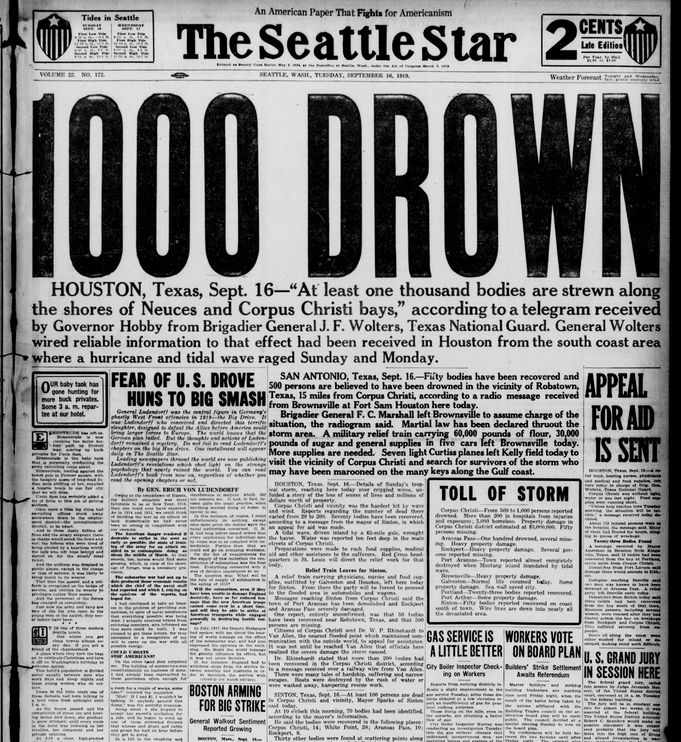
The Seattle Star headlines 1,000 lost to a hurricane hitting Florida and Texas.

- The Treaty of Saint-Germain was signed, formally ending World War I for Austria-Hungary and dissolving the Austrian Empire. The borders of Austria were reduced further with articles forbidding the country from unifying with Germany, leading to the establishment of the First Austrian Republic. It also granted sovereignty to Carpathian Ruthenia using territory in what is now western Ukraine and eastern Slovakia.
- A hurricane struck Goulds, Florida before moving through the Florida Keys, killing 600 people in the Florida Keys and Corpus Christi, Texas. Most of the casualties, roughly 500, were caught in one of 10 boats caught out at sea during the hurricane.
- Boston experienced an overnight spike in crime at the onset of the police strike, forcing Massachusetts Governor Calvin Coolidge to order 5,000 State Guards to retain order in the city.
- The New Hampshire Senate ratified the 19th amendment with a vote of 14 for and 10 against.
- The first Veterans Day Parade was held in New York City, with General John J. Pershing of the American Expeditionary Forces in attendance.
- Public sympathy for five sailors convicted of mutiny while serving on Royal Australian Navy battlecruiser HMAS Australia in June forced the navy to reduce sentences for the participants.
- The 1919 Schneider Trophy race, the first since 1914, was flown at Bournemouth, England. However, poor weather conditions forced many of the competing planes to ground for safety, including Schneider Cup favorite Harry Hawker who was forced to land his Sopwith seaplane due to heavy fog. Other planes making debuts at the competition but were grounded that day included the Avro 539, Grahame-White Bantam, and the Sea Lion.
- Football and sports clubs were established in the following cities: Spartak Pleven in Pleven, Bulgaria, and Desamparados in San Juan, Argentina which currently plays in Torneo Argentino B.

== September 11, 1919 (Thursday) ==
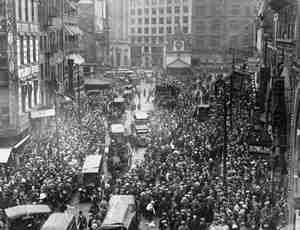
Newly arrived Massachusetts State Guards try to keep order in Scollay Square, Boston after the city's police enforce went on strike.

- Russian Civil War – The White Army foiled attempts by the Red Army to recapture the city of Tsaritsyn (now Volgograd). This ultimately led to the end of the counteroffensive.
- Violence peaked during the Boston police strike, with riots and disorder. At one point, mounted State Guards charged a crowd, resulting in one death. In total, nine people were killed in violence around the city.
- The Turkish National Movement established the Committee of Representation in Sivas, Turkey as the executive branch of the General Assembly of the Ottoman Empire.
- Italian World War I ace Giovanni Ancillotto made a six-hour nonstop flight from Rome to Warsaw, where Ignacy Jan Paderewski, Prime Minister of Poland greeted him personally upon his arrival. Ultimately, the flight resulted in Italy selling 75 Ansaldo biplanes to the Polish Air Force.
- Archbishop Michael Gallagher of the Roman Catholic Archdiocese of Detroit established the Sacred Heart Major Seminary in Detroit.
- Born:
  - Daphne Odjig, Canadian indigenous artist, member of the Indian Group of Seven; in Wiikwemkoong, Ontario, Canada (b. 2016)
  - Reed Whittemore, American poet, 28th United States Poet Laureate; as Edward Reed Whittemore, Jr., in New Haven, Connecticut, United States (d. 2012)

== September 12, 1919 (Friday) ==
- Russian Civil War – General Anton Denikin of the White Army ordered his troops to concentrate on breaking the Red Army on the Southern Front in his attempt to capture Moscow.
- Nationalist poet Gabriele D'Annunzio led 2,600 Italian irredentist troops against a mixed force of Allied soldiers to occupy the city of Fiume (now Rijeka, Croatia) where he announced it had been annexed to the Kingdom of Italy.
- The Dáil Éireann was declared illegal by the British authorities, leading to raids on Sinn Féin centres and resulting in Irish nationalist leader Ernest Blythe being arrested.
- First gold fixing took place in London.
- Samuel Gompers, president of the American Federation of Labor, called for an end to the Boston police strike on the basis the city would suspend judgement on whether the police force could form a union, which was accepted by the police.
- The Babeș-Bolyai University was established in Cluj-Napoca, Romania as one of the five elite universities in the country.
- The Women's Peace Society was established in the United States after several members of the Women's International League for Peace and Freedom resigned in protest over "a fundamental lack of unity in the membership as a whole and in the executive committee".
- The Academia Mexicana de la Historia was established in Mexico City to research and promote the history of Mexico.
- The film Country Maiden, directed and produced by José Nepomuceno, became the first domestic cinematic production to be released in the Philippines.
- Adolf Hitler attends, for the very first time, a meeting of the German Workers' Party in Munich. The party will soon be renamed the National Socialist German Workers' Party.
- Died:
  - Leonid Andreyev, 48, Russian writer, author of plays and fiction including He Who Gets Slapped and Poor Murderer (b. 1871)
  - Thomas Frederick Price, 59, American missionary, co-founder of Maryknoll; died from a burst appendix (b. 1860)

== September 13, 1919 (Saturday) ==
- The Boston police strike formally ended with most of the 1,100 striking police officers fired and replaced with more than 1,500 new officers from a pool of World War I veterans, despite objections from the Mayor of Boston and Massachusetts Governor Calvin Coolidge.
- A massive fire broke out at an oil refinery operated by Standard Oil in Greenpoint, Brooklyn, New York City. Over a thousand firefighters fought the blaze over the next three days, with 300 treated for burns and minor injuries. Total damages were estimated at $5,000,000 ($92,850,300 in 2025).
- The Royal Air Force disbanded squadron No. 261 at Felixstowe, England.
- The General Confederation of Labour was established in Portugal.
- The Australian Imperial Force cricket tour wrapped in England against the Mitcham Cricket Club, winning the match by five wickets. The Australians would tour next in South Africa.
- Born:
  - Milton Rubenfeld, American air force officer, co-founder of the Israeli Air Force, father of Paul Reubens; in Peekskill, New York, United States (d. 2004)
  - Olle Anderberg, Swedish wrestler, silver medalist at the 1948 Summer Olympics and gold medalist at the 1952 Summer Olympics; in Asmundtorp, Sweden (d. 2003)
  - George Weidenfeld, Austrian-born English publisher, co-founder of Weidenfeld & Nicolson; as Arthur George Weidenfeld, in Vienna, Austria (d. 2016)
  - Mary Midgley, English philosopher, promoter of animal rights and environmentalism, author of Beat and Man; as Mary Scrutton, in London, England (d. 2018)

== September 14, 1919 (Sunday) ==
- Hurling team St. Finbarr's defeated Blackrock 5–3 to 4–1 to win the 32nd staging of the Cork Premier Senior Hurling Championship, their fifth championship title overall.
- The Joseph Marien Stadium opened in Brussels and would host football for the 1920 Summer Olympics.
- The football club Gonsenheim was established in Mainz, Germany.
- Born: Gil Langley, Australian cricketer, batsman for the Australia national cricket team from 1945 to 1956; as Gilbert Roche Andrews Langley, in North Adelaide, Australia (d. 2001)

== September 15, 1919 (Monday) ==
- The Daily newspaper began publication in Athens.
- The football club Alsenborn was established in Enkenbach-Alsenborn, Germany.
- Born: Fausto Coppi, Italian cyclist, five-time winner of the Giro d'Italia, two-time winner of the Tour de France and 1953 UCI World Champion; as Angelo Fausto Coppi, in Castellania Coppi, Kingdom of Italy (present-day Italy) (d. 1960)
- Died: Khai Kam, 54-55, Burmese revolutionary leader, led a rebellion against the British in Chin Hills, Burma (now part of Thailand) (b. 1864)

== September 16, 1919 (Tuesday) ==
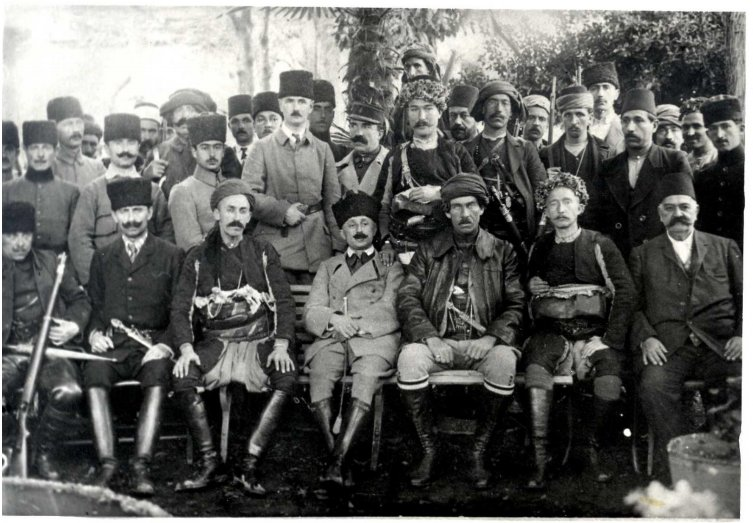
Participants of the Alaşehir Congress

- The Turkish National Movement held a nine-day congress in Alaşehir, Turkey to discuss further means to retain sovereignty from Greece in the Turkish War of Independence.
- Sports club Egersund was established in Egersund, Norway with programs in football, handball and athletics.
- Born:
  - Andy Russell, American singer, known for Latin and adult contemporary hit including "What a Diff'rence a Day Makes" and "It's Such a Pretty World Today"; as Andrés Rábago, in Los Angeles, United States (d. 1992)
  - Bill Daley, American football player, linebacker for the Minnesota Golden Gophers football club and Michigan Wolverines football club in 1942 and 1943; in Melrose, Minnesota, United States (d. 2015)
  - Lawrence Dobkin, American television director, best known as the narrator for the 1960s television crime series Naked City; in New York City, United States (d. 2002)
- Died: Alfred Parland, 76, Russian architect, designer of many churches in Moscow including Church of the Savior on Blood (b. 1842)

== September 17, 1919 (Wednesday) ==
- Russian Civil War – The White Army captured the towns of Sumy, Oboyan, and Stary Oskol in their advance on Moscow.
- The Alabama House of Representatives rejected ratification of the 19th Amendment with a vote of 60 against and 31 in favor. The state would not ratify the amendment until 1953.
- The first Girls Amateur Golf Championship was held in Stoke Park, Buckinghamshire, England with 16 golfers competing.

== September 18, 1919 (Thursday) ==
- The Netherlands granted women the right to vote. The right to stand in election had previously been granted in 1917.
- The University of Ljubljana was established in Ljubljana, Slovenia, and remains the oldest and largest university in the country.
- The film company AB Svensk Filmindustri was founded in Stockholm, and became the largest film studio in Sweden.
- The Ufa-Palast am Zoo in Berlin reopened as a permanent cinema with the première of Ernst Lubitsch's film Madame Dubarry. The film itself grossed $1 million to become fourth highest-grossing film of 1919.
- The Romanian National Opera was established with the official opening of the new Romanian National Theatre in Cluj-Napoca, Romania.
- The football club Batatais was established in Batatais, Brazil.

== September 19, 1919 (Friday) ==
- Compagnie des Messageries Aériennes (CMA) commenced a regular service between Paris and London, using ex-military Bréguet aircraft.
- The Banat Social Democratic Party was established in Banat, Romania, evolving into the Banat Socialist Party the following year.
- Born:
  - Josiah Zion Gumede, Zimbabwean state leader, first President of Zimbabwe Rhodesia; in Bubi District, Southern Rhodesia (present-day Zimbabwe) (d. 1989)
  - Ned Harkness, Canadian-American hockey coach, managed the RPI Engineers men's ice hockey and Cornell Big Red men's ice hockey teams from 1949 and 1970, coach and administrator for the Detroit Red Wings from 1970 to 1974; as Nevin Donald Harkness, in Ottawa, Canada (d. 2008)
  - Mike Holovak, American football player and coach, fullback for the Boston College Eagles football team in 1942, and Los Angeles Rams and Chicago Bears from 1946 to 1948, coach for the Boston Patriots and New York Jets from 1951 to 1976, general manager for Houston Oilers from 1989 to 1993; in Lansford, Pennsylvania, United States (d. 2008)
  - Roy Marlin Voris, American naval air force officer, commander of the VFA-101 and VFA-2 squadrons during World War II, founder of the Blue Angels demonstration squadron, three-time recipient of Distinguished Flying Cross and eleven Air Medals; in Los Angeles, United States (d. 2005)

== September 20, 1919 (Saturday) ==
- Babe Ruth scored four runs for the Boston Red Sox against the Washington Senators in Fenway Park, tying the single season record of 27 home runs set by Ned Williamson in 1884. He broke record four days later against the New York Yankees at the Polo Grounds and set a new season record of 29 with a homer against Senators again. The Red Sox, however, finished the season in sixth place.
- East Perth 10.8 (68) defeated East Fremantle 7.4 (46) to win their first West Australian Football League championship.
- Pro golfer Jim Barnes successfully defended his title against challenger Fred McLeod, defeating him 6 & 5 in the final PGA championship at the Engineers Country Club in Roslyn Harbor, New York.
- A rail station opened to serve the Frankston railway line in Edithvale, Victoria, Australia.
- The football club Cray Valley was established, playing their first game against Hamilton House and winning 7–0.
- Born: William Crumm, American air force officer, commander of the 3rd Air Division during the Vietnam War, two-time recipient of the Legion of Merit, Distinguished Flying Cross, four Air Medals, and the Bronze Star Medal; in New York City, United States (d. 1967, killed in an airplane crash)
- Died:
  - Ramón Barros Luco, 84, Chilean state leader, 16th President of Chile (b. 1835)
  - J. W. Comer, 74, American industrialist, plantation and mine owner in Barbour County, Alabama, brother to B. B. Comer (b. 1845)
  - Cy Seymour, 46, American baseball player, outfielder and pitcher for the New York Giants, Baltimore Orioles, Cincinnati Reds, and Boston Braves from 1896 to 1913; died of tuberculosis (b. 1872)

== September 21, 1919 (Sunday) ==
- Russian Civil War – White forces captured the city of Kursk, Russia.
- The Amalgamated Association of Iron and Steel Workers attempted to organize in the United States steel industry by calling a general strike.
- Authorities in Kaunas, Lithuania arrested and charged 117 people involved in an attempt to overthrow the government of Mykolas Sleževičius. The conspiracy had been backed by the Polish Military Organisation and support of the Józef Piłsudski government in Poland.
- Chicago White Sox first baseman Chick Gandil conspired with seven other teammates at The Ansonia hotel in New York City to intentionally lose the upcoming World Series against the Cincinnati Reds in exchange of gambling money from racketeer Arnold Rothstein that in some cases was nine times the actual baseball club's salary.
- Hurling team Cork defeated Dublin 6–4 to 2–4 in front of the crowd of 14,300 spectators at Croke Park, Dublin to win the 33rd staging of the All-Ireland Senior Hurling Championship.
- The British Symphony Orchestra made its public debut at Royal Albert Hall in London.
- The football club Mačva Šabac was established in Šabac, Serbia.
- Born:
  - Fazlur Rahman Malik, Pakistani theologian, promoter of liberalism and progressivism within Islam; in Hazara District, British India (present-day Pakistan) (d. 1988)
  - Mario Bunge, Argentine-Canadian philosopher, developed concepts such as sociotechnology and systemics; in Buenos Aires, Argentina (d. 2020)
  - Jonas M. Platt, American marine officer, assistant division commander of the 3rd Marine Division during the Vietnam War, recipient of the Navy Distinguished Service Medal, Legion of Merit, Silver Star, and Bronze Star Medal; in New York City, United States (d. 2000)
  - Jim McCairns, British air force officer, member of the No. 56 and No. 3 Squadrons as well as the Special Operations Executive during World War II, recipient of the Distinguished Flying Cross, Military Medal, and Croix de Guerre; in Niagara Falls, New York, United States (d. 1948, killed in a plane crash)

== September 22, 1919 (Monday) ==
- The Committee of 48 announced that a national conference on forming a third political party in the United States would be held in St. Louis.
- The Swedish crime thriller film Sir Arne's Treasure, directed by Mauritz Stiller and starring Richard Lund, went into wide release.
- The Asociación Amateurs de Football was established in Buenos Aires as a dissident sports organization from the Argentine Football Association, until both merged in 1926.

== September 23, 1919 (Tuesday) ==
- Sports club Belenenses was established in Lisbon, and became well known for its long-running football program.
- The municipality of Notre-Dame-du-Nord, Quebec was established.
- Born: Hyman Minsky, American economist, known for his research into the characteristics of the financial crisis; in Chicago, United States (d. 1996)
- Died: Seth Bullock, 70, Canadian-American law enforcer, sheriff of Deadwood, South Dakota and builder of the Bullock Hotel; died of colon cancer (b. 1849)

== September 24, 1919 (Wednesday) ==
- The Red Army of Turin, a paramilitary group set up to protect socialist groups, engaged in a firefight with police and soldiers in Turin after authorities fired on crowds attending a banned protect demonstration by the Socialist Party of Turin against Italian nationalists seizing the port city of Fiume in Croatia.
- An Italian Savoia 13 became the only competing aircraft to complete the 1919 Schneider Trophy race after poor weather grounded so many others, but it was disqualified for missing a turning buoy. When judges asked pilot Guido Janello to complete another lap, he ran out of fuel.
- The first meeting of the National Catholic Welfare Council was held at the Catholic University of America in Washington, D.C., with Edward Joseph Hanna, Archbishop of San Francisco, elected as the first chair.
- Born: Spurgeon Neel, American army medical officer, first commander of the United States Army Health Services Command, best known for pioneering medical evacuation for battlefield casualties using aircraft, recipient of the Distinguished Service Medal, Legion of Merit, and Bronze Star Medal; in Memphis, Tennessee, United States (d. 2003)
- Died: Frank Laver, 49, Australian cricketer, batsman for the Australia national cricket team from 1899 to 1909; died of a cerebral hemorrhage (b. 1869)

== September 25, 1919 (Thursday) ==
- U.S. President Woodrow Wilson delivered his last public speech in Pueblo, Colorado before he collapsed. He returned to Washington, D.C. to recover but would suffer a debilitating stroke days later that rendered him unable to make public appearances.
- The 74th Aero Squadron of the United States Army Air Service was disbanded at Langley Field, Virginia.
- The Socialist Workers Party was established in Jaffa, Palestine, the precursor to the Palestine Communist Party.
- Moravian composer Leoš Janáček established the Brno Conservatory in Brno, Moravia (then part of Czechoslovakia).
- The football club Reggiana was established in Reggio Emilia, Italy.
- Born: Tom Carnegie, American sports broadcaster, longtime public announcer for the Indianapolis Motor Speedway from 1946 to 2006; as Carl Lee Kenagy, in Norwalk, Connecticut, United States (d. 2011)
- Died: Charles Lang Freer, 65, American industrialist, founder of the American Car and Foundry Company, amassed an art collection of over 5,000 pieces that were donated to the Smithsonian Institution (b. 1854)

== September 26, 1919 (Friday) ==
- Russian Civil War – The Black Army under command of Nestor Makhno defeated a White Russian force southeast of Uman, Ukraine, inflicting 4,000 casualties. The success began to provide needed relief for the besieged Bolsheviks in Moscow as more White troops had to be directed south to answer the Black Army threat.
- The fifth cabinet of the Ion I. C. Brătianu administration was dissolved in Romania and replaced by a cabinet under the Artur Văitoianu administration.
- Born: Ezio Loik, Italian football player, midfielder for Torino and the Italy national football team from 1942 to 1949; in Fiume, Italian Regency of Carnaro (present-day Rijeka, Croatia) (d. 1949, killed in the Superga air disaster)
- Died: Francis Bertie, 75, British diplomat, Ambassador to Italy from 1903 to 1905, and Ambassador to France from 1905 to 1918 (b. 1844)

== September 27, 1919 (Saturday) ==
- Russian Civil War – Faced with the possibility of losing Moscow to the White Army, the Red Army Southern Front was split in two and the Southeastern Front was established. An underground party committee was set up within the Russian capital while the public face of the Soviet government began evacuating to Vologda, Russia.
- The Amherst Internment Camp, the largest POW camp in Canada during World War I, was closed in Amherst, Nova Scotia.
- The National Union of Railwaymen called on all railway workers in the United Kingdom to strike.
- The Swedish parliament decided to instate the eight-hour work day.
- The Oslo Philharmonic performed their first concert in Oslo with Finnish musician Georg Schnéevoigt as conductor.
- Sturt and North Adelaide drew 5.9 (39) apiece in the South Australian Football League Grand Final.
- Born:
  - Charles H. Percy, American politician, U.S Senator of Illinois from 1967 till 1985; in Pensacola, Florida, United States (d. 2011)
  - Sandy Gunn, Scottish air force officer, member of the No. 1 Photo Reconnaissance and escape team from the German POW camp Stalag Luft III; as Alastair Donald Mackintosh Gunn, in Auchterarder, Scotland (d. 1944, executed)
- Died:
  - Luisa Cappiani, 90, Austrian opera singer and educator, founding member of the American Federation of Musicians and Music Teachers National Association (b. 1829)
  - Gardner Dow, 21, American college football player for the Connecticut Aggies; died after sustaining a traumatic brain injury in a game (b. 1898)
  - Adelina Patti, 76, Italian opera singer, known for her opera recordings for the Gramophone Company (b. 1843)

== September 28, 1919 (Sunday) ==
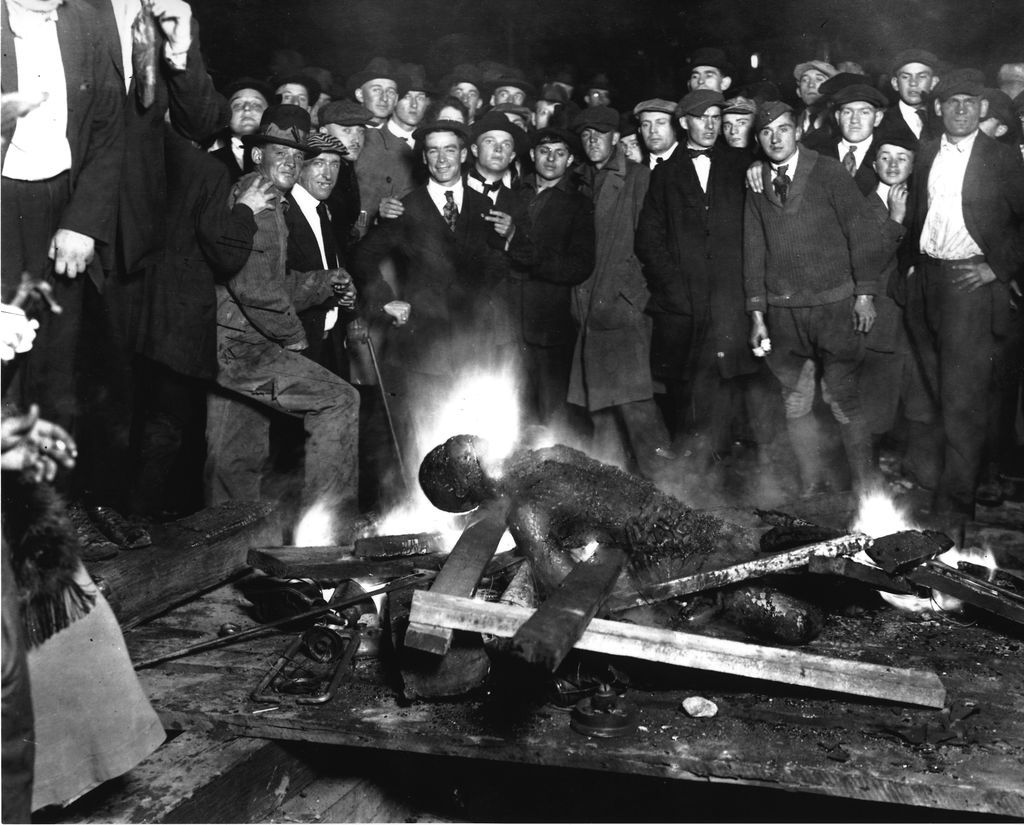
Photo of Will Brown, after he was burned to death by a lynch mob in Omaha, Nebraska.

- Red Summer – A mob of 10,000 whites overran the police station and courthouse in Omaha, Nebraska and lynched black prisoner Will Brown, who was alleged to have raped a white woman despite conflicting evidence. The resulting violence lead to over $1 million in property damages. Mayor Edward Parsons Smith was nearly killed from an attempted hanging; Smith had been at the courthouse and ventured out to try to reason with a crowd when a gunshot rang out that the crowd assumed had come from him. Federal troops under command of Leonard Wood arrived and quelled the violence the following day. Despite over a hundred arrests, none of the white rioters were ever convicted.
- The majority of voters in a referendum in Luxembourg voted to retain the monarchy with Grand Duchess Charlotte as head of state and an economic union with France.
- The University of Latvia was established in Riga.
- Gaelic football team Kildare defeated Galway 2–5 to 0–1 in front of the crowd of 32,000 spectators at Croke Park, Dublin to win the 33rd staging of the All-Ireland Senior Football Championship.
- Belgian cyclist Léon Devos won the ninth Liège–Bastogne–Liège cycling race, completing the 237 km racing route in 9 hours, 20 minutes, 30 seconds.
- The Lithuanian Labour Federation was established as the national trade union center of Lithuania.
- The Indian Cane Growers Association was established in Ba Province, Fiji.
- Born:
  - Nicholas Goodhart, British aviation engineer, designer of the optical landing system used on aircraft carriers; as Hilary Charles Nicholas Goodhart, in Inkpen, England (d. 2011)
  - Tom Harmon, American football player, halfback for the Michigan Wolverines football team in 1941 and the Los Angeles Rams from 1946 to 1947; in Rensselaer, Indiana, United States (d. 1990)

== September 29, 1919 (Monday) ==
- The Italian Parliament was dissolved following fights that erupted in the Chamber of Deputies during a debate about the annexation of Fiume. Elections were then called for November 16.
- The Utah State Senate ratified the 19th Amendment.
- Red Summer – A white mob lynched two discharged African-American soldiers in Montgomery, Alabama following rumors they assaulted two white women in separate incidents.
- The Société Générale de Belgique of Belgium established the Banque Générale in Luxembourg City, and remains the second largest employer in Luxembourg.
- The German Ceramic Society was established in Cologne.
- Born: Masao Takemoto, Japanese gymnast, silver and bronze medalist at the 1952 and 1956 Summer Olympics, and gold and silver medalist at the 1960 Summer Olympics; in Hamada, Shimane, Empire of Japan (present-day Japan) (d. 2007)

== September 30, 1919 (Tuesday) ==
- Red Summer – Spurned by rumors that an attempt to form a sharecroppers union in Elaine, Arkansas was a cover for a "socialist" insurrection, a clash between whites and blacks outside a black church resulted in the shooting death of a white man. Hundreds of white men formed a militia and began attacking rural black communities, resulting in 100 to 237 black deaths over two days before requested federal troops arrived to disarm the rioters. Because the white militia had claimed they were stopping a rebellion, federal troops arrested nearly 300 blacks and 122 were convicted in court, including 12 for murder. The NAACP intervened and appealed the 12 convictions through the Supreme Court of the United States, who overturned the convictions on the basis the mob-dominated trials deprived the defendants of due process.
- The Utah House of Representatives followed the state senate and ratified the 19th Amendment.
- The 3rd Operation Group of the United States Army Air Service was established for service in the Panama Canal Zone.
- The John Brown University officially opened for classes in Siloam Springs, Arkansas.
- The stage comedy The Gold Diggers by Avery Hopwood premiered on Broadway with Ina Claire in the lead role. The play was a hit with 720 performances and grossing $1.9 million. Many credit the play for popularizing the term "gold digger" to refer to women who seek wealthy men as marriage partners.
- Born:
  - Patricia Neway, American opera singer, best known for her collaboration with New York City Opera; in New York City, United States (d. 2012)
  - William L. Guy, American politician, 26th Governor of North Dakota; in Devils Lake, North Dakota, United States (d. 2013)
