= Dynic =

Dynic may refer to:

- Dynic Corporation, a Japanese company
- Dynic Astronomical Observatory, an astronomical observatory in Japan
