= Der Feldarbeiter =

Der Feldarbeiter ('The Farm Worker') was a newspaper published from Budapest, Hungary from 1906 to 1907. The first issue was published on 21 April 1906. It was a German-language edition of Világszabadság. Initially edited by Kálmán Jócsák, from 30 June 1906 onwards it was edited by Richard Schwarz. It was replaced by Weltfreiheit.
