= Weltfreiheit =

Weltfreiheit ('World Freedom') was a weekly newspaper published from Budapest, Hungary between May 1907 and March 1908. Weltfreiheit was an organ of the Magyarországi Földmunkások Országos Szövetségébe ('National Farm Workers Union of Hungary'). It replaced the newspaper Der Feldarbeiter. It carried the by-line 'Central Organ of the Farm Workers of Hungary'. The first issue was published on 11 May 1907. It was the German-language edition of the Hungarian-language Világszabadság. Richard Schwartz served as the editor of Weltfreiheit. It was published on Saturdays.
