= Világszabadság =

Világszabadság ('World Freedom') was a weekly newspaper published from Budapest, Hungary from 1897 to August 3, 1919. It was linked to the Social Democratic Party of Hungary and was a key mouthpiece of the agrarian-socialist movement. It was the organ of the Magyarországi Földmunkások Országos Szövetségébe ('National Farm Workers Union of Hungary'). The newspaper was set up as a continuation of Földművelők Lapja. Sándor Csizmadia was the founding editor of the newspaper. Between 1899 and 1905 it was published irregularly.

== See also ==
- Der Feldarbeiter
- Weltfreiheit
