= Halls, Georgia =

- Unincorporated community
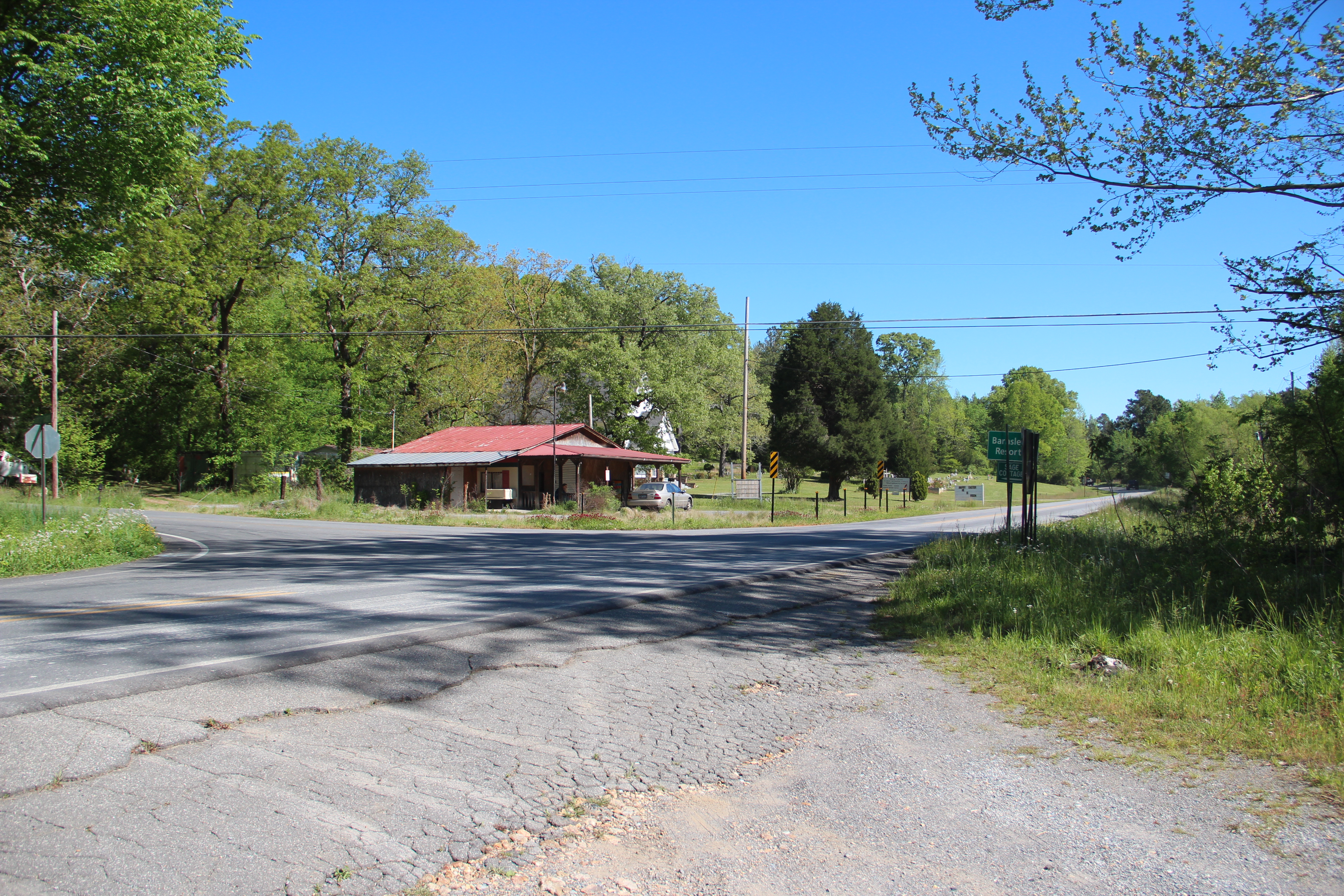
- Halls Station Road in Halls

- Location within the state of Georgia Halls, Georgia (the United States)
- Coordinates: 34°17′54″N 84°56′24″W
- Country: United States
- State: Georgia
- County: Bartow
- Elevation: 909 ft (277 m)
- Time zone: UTC-5 (Eastern (EST))
  - Summer (DST): UTC-4 (EDT)
- Area codes: 770, 678 & 470

Halls is an unincorporated community in Bartow County, in the U.S. state of Georgia.

== History ==
The community (previously called Hall's Mill and Hall's Station) was named for a railroad agent, L. H. Hall. A post office called Hall's Mill was in operation from 1868 until 1895.
