= Johannes Gouws =

Johannes Stephanus Gouws
- Born: Johannes Stephanus Gouws; 13 August 1919; Bultfontein, Orange Free State, South Africa
- Died: 29 March 1944 (aged 24); Munich area
- Burial place: Poznan Old Garrison Cemetery, Poland
- Military career
- Allegiance: South Africa
- Branch: South African Air Force
- Service years: 1940–44
- Rank: Lieutenant
- Service number: 103275
- Units: No. 41 Squadron SAAF, No. 40 Squadron SAAF
- Conflicts: World War II: Western Desert campaign (POW)
- Awards: Mentioned in Despatches

Johannes Gouws (13 August 1919 – 29 March 1944), was a fighter pilot from South Africa who was taken prisoner during the Second World War. Notable for his part in the 'Great Escape' from Stalag Luft III in March 1944 when he almost reached Switzerland but was one of the men recaptured and subsequently murdered by the Gestapo.

== Pre-war life ==
Gouws was born in Bultfontein, South Africa the eldest son of an Afrikaans speaking farming family of Boer tradition. His boyhood ambition was to join the British South Africa Police. He was educated at the farm school and later Bultfontein High School where he was a keen athlete and captained the school rugby football team when it toured Cape Province in 1937. He graduated from school that year and joined the Special Service Battalion a training unit for boys wishing to join the military. He applied for the South African Air Force but failed as his English language did not meet the required standard. Gouws returned to school, studied at University College of Orange Free State to read science and improved his language skills.

== Service career ==
Gouws was successful in his next attempt and joined the South African Air Force on 14 May 1940 as a pilot candidate and service number 103275. After completing basic training he learned to fly in South Africa in de Havilland Tiger Moth aircraft. He received his aircrew brevet “wings” and commission as second lieutenant on 29 March 1941. He was posted on 7 May 1941 to No. 41 Squadron SAAF flying Hawker Hartbees fighter bombers in Abyssinia. On a ground attack mission on 18 August 1941 his aircraft developed a fuel leak and he had to crash land in a ploughed field, the aircraft flipped over and his crewman had to fight to free Gouws from the wreckage. The local farmer assisted them for a reward and they returned safely.

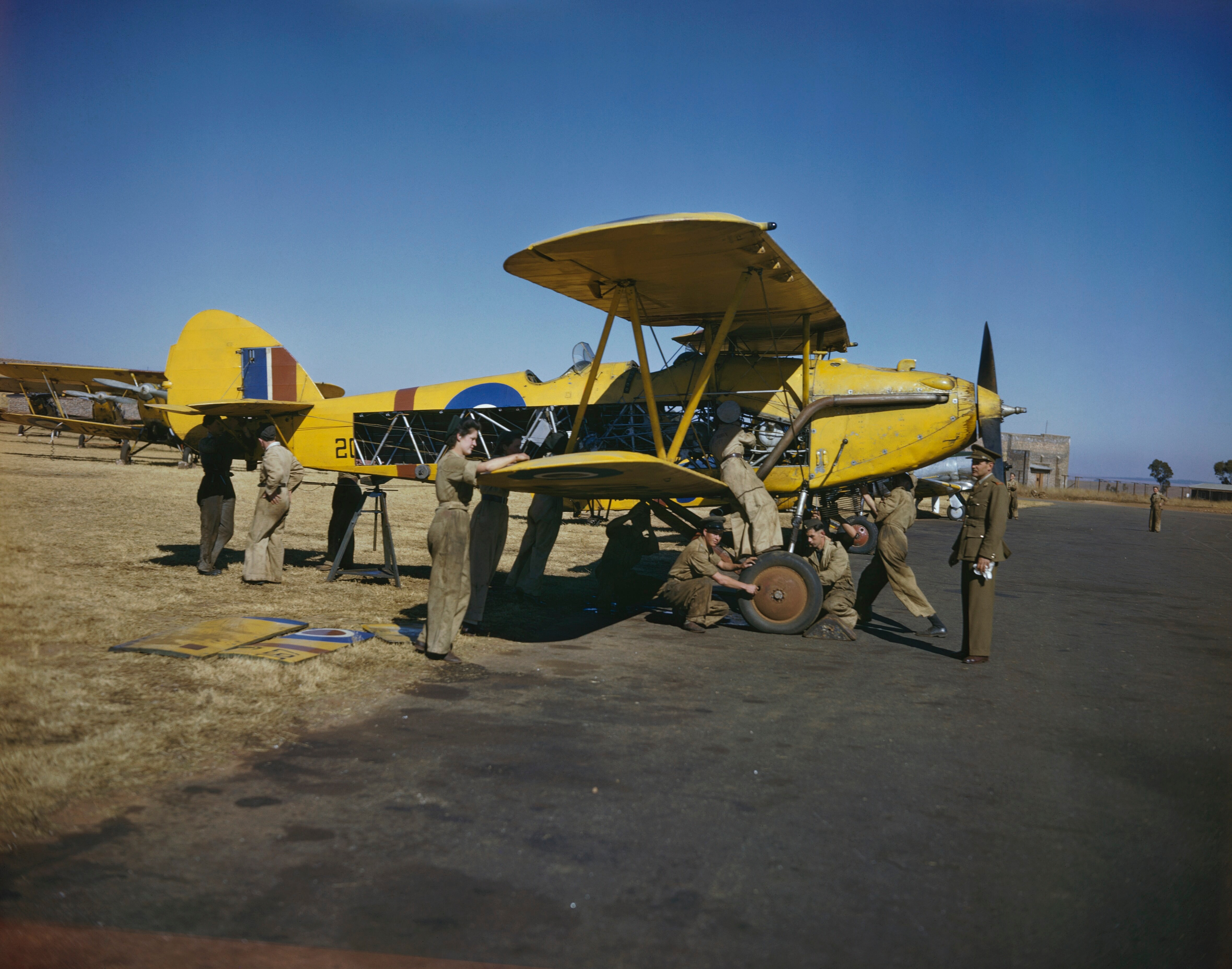
Hawker Hartbees

In September 1941 he was posted to No. 40 Squadron SAAF which was then back in South Africa, the squadron's personnel were flown to Egypt to join the Desert Air Force. Until new aircraft arrived, the Squadron operated at Burg-el-Arab as an Advanced Maintenance Unit. In this period, six pilots were attached to No. 208 Squadron RAF for operational experience in modern monoplane fighters. The squadron became fully operational in March 1942, flying tactical reconnaissance missions and Photo Recce in support of British Eighth Army. The squadron's pilots soon learnt to operate in pairs and to stay out of range of small arms fire from the ground, to reduce heavy casualties; however, as Erwin Rommel's Afrika Korps prepared to go on the offensive, Luftwaffe Messerschmitt Bf 109 fighters concentrated on intercepting Tac.R aircraft. Casualties rose rapidly until HQ Desert Air Force ordered a fighter escort for all Tac.Rs.

== Prisoner of war ==
One of the casualties was on 9 April 1942, a P-40 Tomahawk flown by Lieutenant Gouws on a mission over the Chichiba-Ezzeiat area was intercepted by two Bf 109’s and he was shot down by Luftwaffe flying ace Gustav Rödel of Jagdgeschwader 27. Gouws belly-landed his aircraft on fire south of Mteifel Chebir and was taken prisoner.

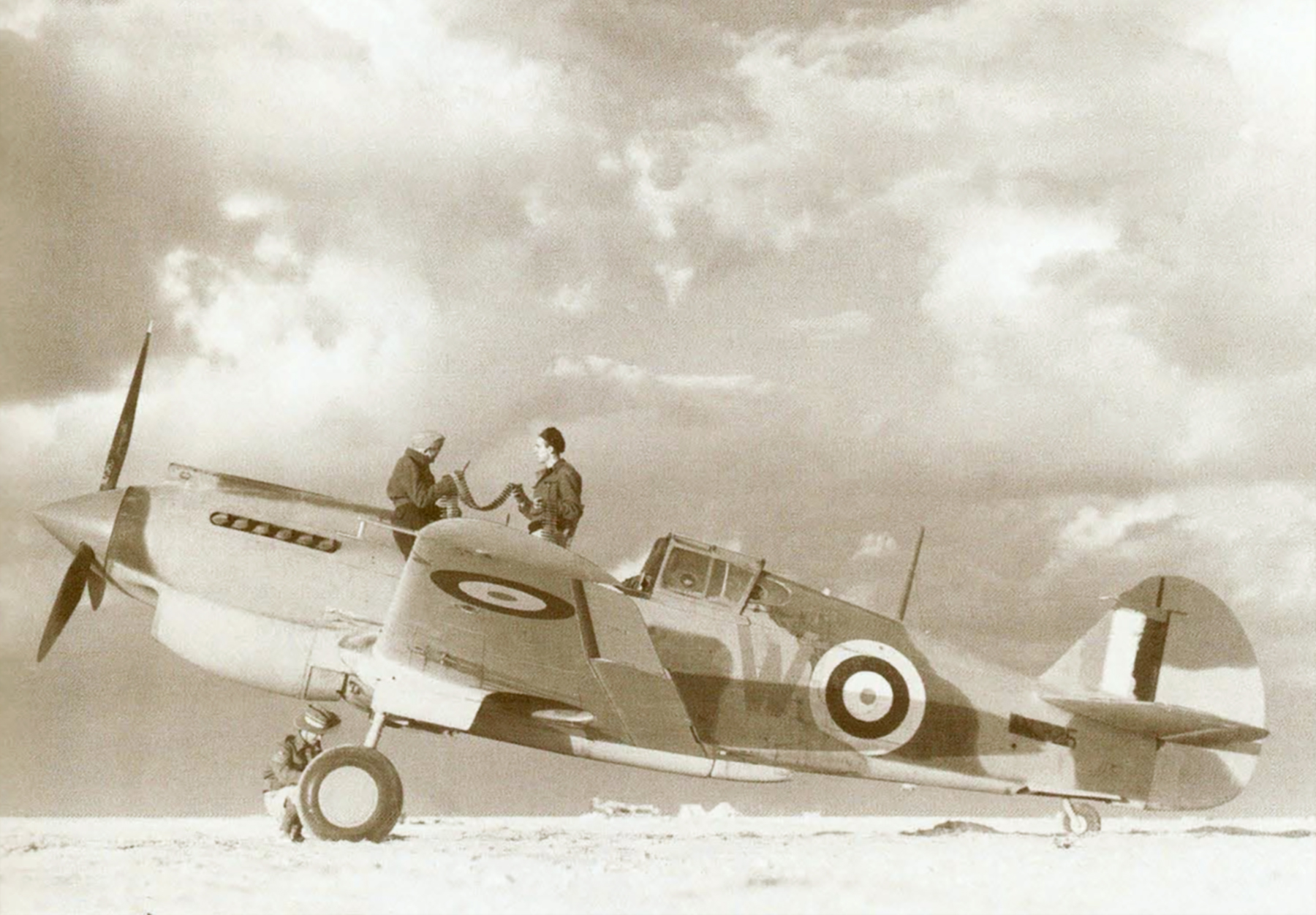
Armourers working on a P-40 Tomahawk in North Africa, 23 December 1941

== 'Great Escape' ==
For the Great Escape operation Gouws was one of the team dispersing the excavated sandy earth he was given an early position in the queue of men to pass through the tunnel due to his active participation in the tunneling and fair command of the German language. Gouws was one of the first ten of the 76 men who escaped the prison camp on the night of 24–25 March 1944, in the escape now famous as "The Great Escape". When the Germans discovered the escape they began extensive well planned manhunts. The plan of Gouws and his British born South African partner Rupert Stevens was apparently to head for Switzerland via Breslau They missed the train which they had hoped to catch at Sagan but travelled on a later train to Breslau and later towards Switzerland on to Lindau where they were recaptured on 29 March 1944 near the Bodensee beside the border of neutral Switzerland. on two different trains The two South Africans were taken to Munich central Gestapo offices, later that day they were apparently shot and cremated

He was one of the 50 escapers executed and murdered by the Gestapo. Originally cremated and buried at Sagan, he is now buried in part of the Poznan Old Garrison Cemetery. His name is recorded on the official list published by the Royal Canadian Air Force

His name was amongst the 47 murdered officers named in the British press when the story became public knowledge on or about 20 May 1944

Memorial to "The Fifty" down the road toward Żagań

== Awards ==
His conspicuous bravery was recognized by a Mention in Despatches as none of the other relevant decorations then available could be awarded posthumously. It was published in a supplement to the London Gazette on 8 June 1944.

== Other victims ==
See Stalag Luft III murders

The Gestapo executed a group of 50 of the recaptured prisoners representing almost all of the nationalities involved in the escape.

Post-war investigations saw a number of those guilty of the murders tracked down, arrested and tried for their crimes.

Nationalities of the 50 executed
(United Kingdom) 21 British
(Canada) 6 Canadian
(Poland) 6 Polish
(Australia) 5 Australian
(South Africa) 3 South African
(New Zealand) 2 New Zealanders
(Norway) 2 Norwegian
(Belgium) 1 Belgian
(Czechoslovakia) 1 Czechoslovak
(France) 1 Frenchman
(Greece) 1 Greek
(Lithuania) 1 Lithuanian
