= Alaşehir Congress =

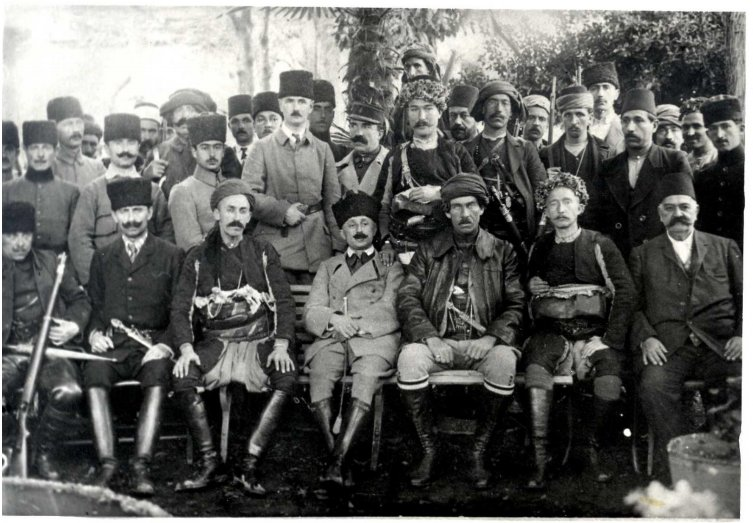
Participants of the Alaşehir Congress: from left to right, Demirci Mehmet Efe, Refet Bele, Çerkes Ethem.

The Alaşehir Congress (Turkish: Alaşehir Kongresi) was a local assembly of the Turkish National Movement held in the town of Alaşehir from 16 to 25 September 1919.

It was preceded by the Balıkesir Congress and was a continuation of the reactionary movement following the Greek occupation of Smyrna. It was headed by the same leader, Hacim Muhittin Bey, and the organization was undertaken by the regional bureaucrats and intelligentsia, who managed a greater participation in comparison to the Balıkesir Congress.

Its decisions included a continuation of the national struggle until the Greek army was driven out of Anatolia, and to reform Kuva-yi Milliye troops as regular, paid units. It established a central headquarters in Alaşehir, regional headquarters in Denizli and Nazilli, and local bureaus in Soma, Ayvalık and Akhisar. It also protested to the Ottoman sultan, grand vizier and Allied representatives, while deciding to take the necessary measures to keep up with the needs of the national forces. Among other decisions were the rejection of the activities of armed gangs, rewards to the families of those who died in action and preparation of reports about Greek atrocities in occupied territories.

The congress expressed continued obedience to the sultan, but was nevertheless supported by Mustafa Kemal. Stanford Jay Shaw wrote that the Alaşehir Congress was independent of Mustafa Kemal's efforts, but still formed the first real resistance army. The rumors that the eastern cities of Anatolia were being given to the Armenians were an important topic in the congress.
