= 1919 Standard Oil Company fire =

1919 fire in New York City

Coordinates: 40°44′N 73°57′W

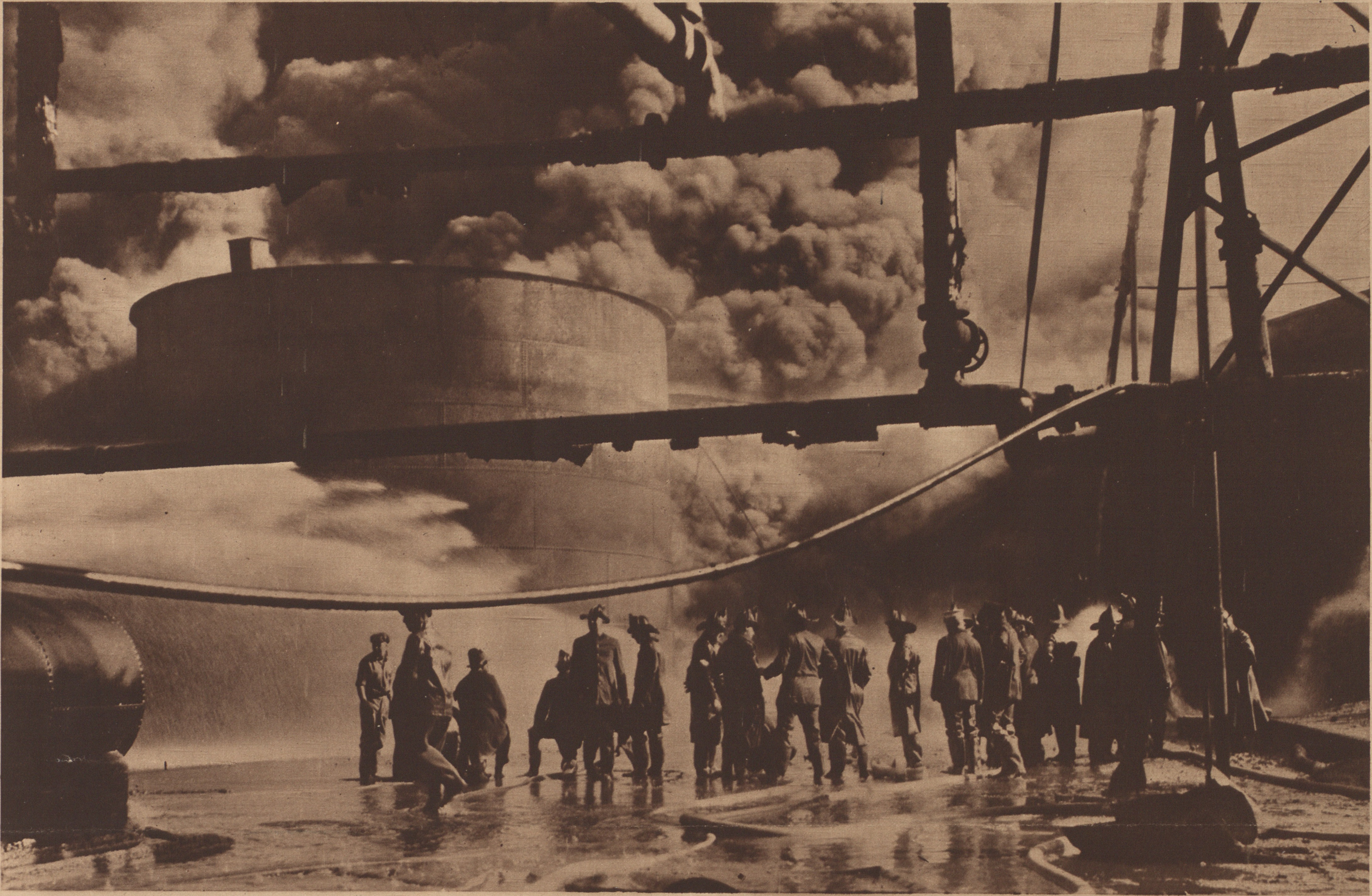
- Date: September 13, 1919
- Time: Started 2:00 p.m. (Eastern Time)
- Location: Standard Oil Company Campus, Greenpoint, Brooklyn, New York City
- Injuries: 300

On September 13, 1919, a fire and explosion occurred at the Standard Oil Company in Greenpoint, Brooklyn, New York City.

== Fire ==
The Standard Oil Company Campus and former Astral Oil Works was spread out over 20 acres (8.1 ha). A fire broke in Tank No. 36 on the Standard Oil Company Campus around 2:00 p.m., but before the New York City Fire Department was called, the tank ignited, sparking off multiple fires throughout the campus. The yard held large quantities of naphtha, gasoline, oil and alcohol and more 1000 barrels of other explosive and flammable liquids. The fire burned furiously for three days, destroying millions of gallons of oil and caused damage estimated at $5,000,000 ($92,850,300 in 2025). Over 1,000 firemen fought the spectacular blaze, 300 of which were treated for burns and minor injuries.

Standard Oil’s Brooklyn refinery may have been an intentional attempt to clear the land and draw insurance. The fire site is now occupied by industrial properties on the western side of Newtown Creek in Greenpoint.

== See also ==
- Great Fire of New York
