= Dynic Corporation =

Japanese company

- Type: Public (K.K)
- Traded as: TYO: 3551
- Industry: Office supplies; Textile
- Founded: Kyoto, Japan (August 18, 1919)
- Headquarters: Kyoto 26 Daimon-cho, Nishikyogoku, Ukyo-ku, Kyoto 615-0812, Japan Tokyo Shin Onarimon Bldg.,6-17-19, Shinbashi, Minato-ku, Tokyo 105-0004, Japan
- Key people: Yoshio Ohishi (President and CEO)
- Products: Textile and nonwoven fabric products; Office supplies; Printing products
- Revenue: $ 420.35 million USD (FY 2012) (¥ 39.934 billion JPY) (FY 2012)
- Net income: $ 9.05 million USD (FY 2012) (¥ 860 million JPY) (FY 2012)
- Number of employees: 1,398 (as of March 31, 2017)
- Subsidiaries: 16 (6 in Japan and 10 overseas)
- Website: Official website

Dynic Corporation (ダイニック株式会社, Dainikku Kabushiki-gaisha) is a Japanese company, manufacturing print media supplies, publishing products, stationery products, non-woven fabric products, special embossed products, foils, films, and paper products. The company is listed on the Tokyo Stock Exchange.

The company's headquarters are located in Kyoto and Tokyo. Dynic was founded in 1919 as Nippon Cloth Industry Co., Ltd. in Kyoto. In 1948 Tokyo office was opened. In 1974 it changed its name to Dynic Corporation.

The company expanded overseas over the years and now has subsidiaries in Taiwan, Singapore, Hong Kong, the United States, Thailand, the UK and China.

In Japan the company has factories in Taga, Shiga, Fukaya, Saitama, Kita, Tokyo, Fuji, Shizuoka and in Mooka, Tochigi.
