= 1919 Actors' Equity Association strike =

Labor strike in New York City, US

Actors' strike of 1919
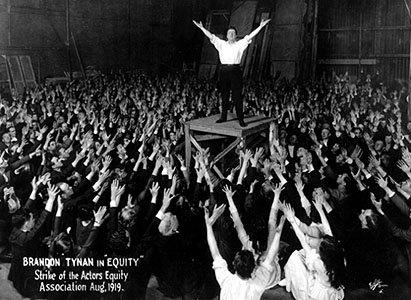
- "Friends, Brothers, Sisters, Countrymen, lend me your ears ... Behind us we have more than five million men and women. The ship of hope – the AFL ... Now, dear public, our great public. You have always stood for justice ... Will you stand up and show that you are with us, and join us in our cry of Equity! Equity!!, Equity!!!" —Speech from the strike benefit performance
- Date: August 7 – September 6, 1919
- Location: New York City
- Methods: Strikes; demonstrations; performances

Parties
Actors' Equity Association	Producing Managers' Association

The 1919 Actors' Equity Association strike officially spanned from August 7, 1919, to September 6, 1919. In the late 19th and early 20th centuries, the theatre industry was revolutionized by powerful management groups that monopolized and centralized the industry. These groups created harsh working conditions for the actors. On May 26, 1913, actors decided to unionize, and they formed the Actors' Equity Association (AEA or "Equity"). After many failed attempts to negotiate with the producers and managers for fair treatment and a standard contract, Equity declared a strike against the Producing Managers' Association on August 7, 1919. During the strike, the actors walked out of theaters, held parades in the streets, and performed benefit shows. Equity received support from the theatrical community, the public, and the American Federation of Labor, and on September 6, 1919, the actors won the strike. The producers signed a contract with the AEA that contained nearly all of Equity's demands. The strike was important because it expanded the definition of labor and altered perceptions about what types of careers could organize. The strike also encouraged other groups within the theatre industry to organize.

== Background ==
=== Working conditions and AEA formation ===
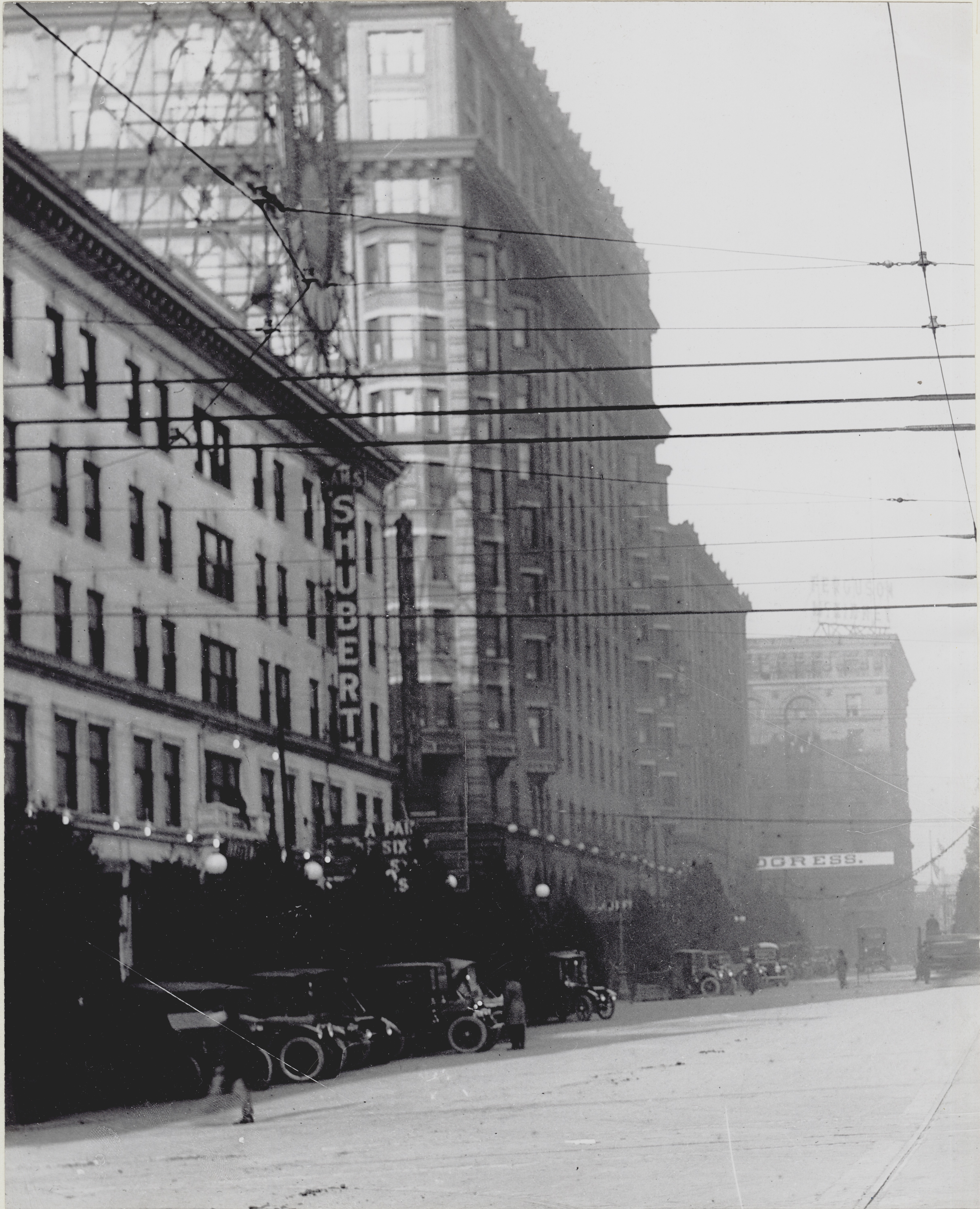
Shubert Theatre in the Union Electric Building circa 1915

In 1896, successful theatre owners and booking managers Marc Klaw and A. L. Erlanger combined with four other theatre bookers/owners to form the Theatrical Syndicate. The Syndicate applied big business practices to the theatre industry, creating a booking monopoly. The group owned three quarters of the theatres in America, including 37 first-class theatres, and had full control over the locations of each play, script changes, and their box office shares. Shortly after the formation of the Theatrical Syndicate, the Shubert brothers started their own monopolistic venture, creating competition for the Syndicate.

In centralizing the theatre industry, these groups also imposed new, strict working conditions for actors. By 1913, actors and actresses had an extensive list of grievances against their managers and producers. Producers had full power over determining their actors' working conditions and pay scale. Actors' rehearsal time was both unlimited and uncompensated; they could spend weeks to months without rehearsal compensation. When evening performances were cancelled, managers would make up for the lost show by adding an additional matinee performance at the next day's location. Performers were often not compensated for either the cancelled show or the added matinee. Actors were also responsible for paying for their own stage costumes and travel. Another industry-wide grievance regarded the "satisfaction clause," commonly referred to as the "joker clause," found in most actors' contracts with their managers. This clause stated that the manager could fire an actor if the actor did not play his or her part to the manager's satisfaction. This gave managers the power to fire actors or cut actors' salaries without warning and for any reason.

To combat these grievances, actors met on January 13, 1913, to discuss the possibility of organization. While organizations such as the Actors' Society of America had been formed previously to fight control of the Syndicate, their membership and influence had largely diminished by 1912, and the actors wanted to create a new organization focused on only their economic grievances. Their goal was to resolve the exploitation of the actor in the theatre industry and to establish a uniform contract that pleased both the manager and the actor. 112 actors officially formed the Actors Equity Association in New York City on May 26, 1913. They elected Francis Wilson as the association's president. By the end of its first year, Equity's membership reached over 1,500 and included many well-known actors.

=== Early AEA and UMPA negotiations ===
In 1914, Equity began working to develop a standard contract to present to the United Managers Protective Association (UMPA), the managers' combination that controlled the majority of the industry. The UMPA was formed by the Theatrical Syndicate, the Shuberts, and other independent producers in response to Equity's formation. This contract included provisions for the number of free rehearsals managers could require of players. It also demanded extra pay when performances numbered more than eight per week, at least a two-week notice of dismissal, and that the managers cover travel and costuming expenses. The managers largely ignored the actors' demands for three years. On October 2, 1917, following Equity's first efforts to join the AFL, the UMPA voted to sign a standard contract that would be valid for one year and was to be used by all companies under their control. The contract included the majority of Equity's demands. However, by December of that year, managers were consistently violating the contract and refusing to acknowledge Equity as a legitimate organization.

Early in 1919, the UMPA dissolved and formed the Producing Managers’ Association (PMA), which continued violating the UMPA-AEA standard contract. In March, Equity membership had grown to comprise nearly 50 percent of theatre actors and there was discussion of creating a closed shop. The closed shop discussion startled the PMA and they called a meeting with Equity leaders on May 2. The two organizations were unable to reach an agreement, and on May 23, the PMA decided to break their ties with Equity.

=== Securing a charter with the AFL ===
There was much debate in Equity over applying for an AFL charter. Most actors considered themselves superior to general "laborers," viewing themselves rather as "artists" and believed their trade was above the technique of organizing. However, when the UMPA continued neglecting the UMPA-AEA standard contract, Equity decided they needed a charter and national support to achieve their goals. On May 29, 1916, 518 out of 519 Equity representatives voted for applying to join the AFL at their annual meeting.

The AFL refused to offer Equity an independent charter. The AFL only gave out one charter to each profession, and all performers were already represented in the AFL by the White Rats, an organization formed by vaudeville performers. The AFL offered Equity a charter as a branch of the international White Rats union, but Equity declined, requesting that the White Rats amend their charter so that they could represent vaudeville performers while Equity could represent “legitimate” actors. The White Rats refused.

After much discussion between the White Rats and the AEA, both organizations came to an agreement on July 18, 1919. They decided to form a new umbrella organization for performing arts, the Associated Actors and Artistes of America (the 4A's). The White Rats gave up its international charter, and the 4A's took its place in the AFL. When the AEA and the White Rats received charters as branches of the 4As, both unions were officially AFL-affiliated.

Affiliation with such an influential labor organization gave Equity power and support it did not previously have. The AEA was the first organization of its kind and they received a lot of attention. The day following their AFL charter, The New York Times featured an article on the new union, reporting that the "unionization of the actor became an established fact".

=== Escalating tensions ===
On July 30, 1919, The New York Times ran a story on Equity's interactions with Chu Chin Chow, a show that had been in rehearsals for weeks and was still without actors' knowledge of an opening date or their wages. Equity encouraged the cast members to stage a walkout in response to the managers' refusal to acknowledge the AEA contract. Hearing about Equity's appeals, the producers of Chu Chin Chow rushed into wage agreements with the cast, and only one cast member followed through with the walkout. In response, Equity President Wilson announced that the rest of the cast would not be returning to rehearsals the next day, but this also did not occur. All the actors attended the rehearsal, refusing to give up their jobs. The New York Times emphasized the tension between the Actors' Equity Association and theatrical managers, describing this event as the beginning of "active warfare" between the two groups. The article discussed how both sides had believed themselves to be victorious, but that the event's conclusion demonstrated that victory was solely on the side of the managers.

== Events of the strike ==
=== Start of the strike ===
On August 7, 1919, the Actors’ Equity Association officially declared a strike against the PMA. The strike resolution read:

Until a satisfactory arrangement is made with it governing the working conditions of the actor, we will not perform any service for any manager who is a member of the Producing Managers' Association, who refused to recognized our Association, or to issue its contracts.

The resolution passed on the first vote unanimously and the strike was in effect by 7 p.m.

That night, twelve famous New York theaters closed, including Shubert Playhouse, Gaiety, Astor, and 44th Street. The managers, completely unprepared for the strike, were forced to give an estimate of $25,000 in ticket refunds that night and had to quickly find actors to replace the stars that had walked out. By the end of the strike's first two weeks, only five theaters in New York City were still operating.

After the initial outbreak, the PMA met to discuss their plan of action. It released a statement on August 11 which claimed that Equity was the enemy of both the manager and the actor because the organization prohibited both from freely engaging in contract labor, and as a result, both lost their personal liberty. The managers filed suits for damages against Equity and printed a warning in The New York Times which declared that actors were personally responsible for the revenue lost during the strike because the strike violated the UMPA-AEA contract. However, the actors pointed out that clause 18 of the contract, governing arbitration, recognized the AEA as a party to the contract. By refusing to acknowledge Equity as a legitimate representative of the actor, the PMA had violated the contract first, giving Equity actors reason and justification for striking.

=== Theatre community involvement ===
The strike was not contained to New York City. After the strike in New York began, Wilson called on the local Equity organization in Chicago, asking specific actors to walk out on the productions A Prince There Was and Cappy Ricks in order to demonstrate the power Equity had over theaters around the country. On August 12, these actors gave notice to their managers and walked out on the productions. By August 20, all of the theaters in Chicago were closed. The strike spread quickly to other large cities, including Boston, Philadelphia, Washington, D.C., Providence, St. Louis, and Atlantic City; there was particular success in Pittsburgh, where the majority of theaters were closed by the end of the strike.

Marie Dressler and Ethel Barrymore during the 1919 strike

Support for the strike came from many different facets of the theatre community. The Barrymores, a prominent theatrical family, offered their solidarity and support despite not having any grievances against their producers. Ethel was the first to join the strikers; her brothers, Lionel and John, followed soon after. Five million trade unionists around the country officially supported the strike. Marie Dressler led the newly formed Chorus Equity Association in picket lines. The Teamsters Union refused to deliver to managers that opposed the AEA. The International Alliance of Billposters and Billers of the United States and Canada refused to post bills for theaters with anti-Equity managers. The Theatrical Mechanics Union also pledged their support. In September, stagehands and musicians in Boston and New York walked out to support the strike, forcing six Boston theatres to shut their doors. On September 2, 1919, The New York Times ran a story on this event, and the article's headline read "Stagehands Now Run the Strike." Equity membership also soared during the strike; their numbers went from 4,200 members at the beginning of the strike to 6,000 by August 16.

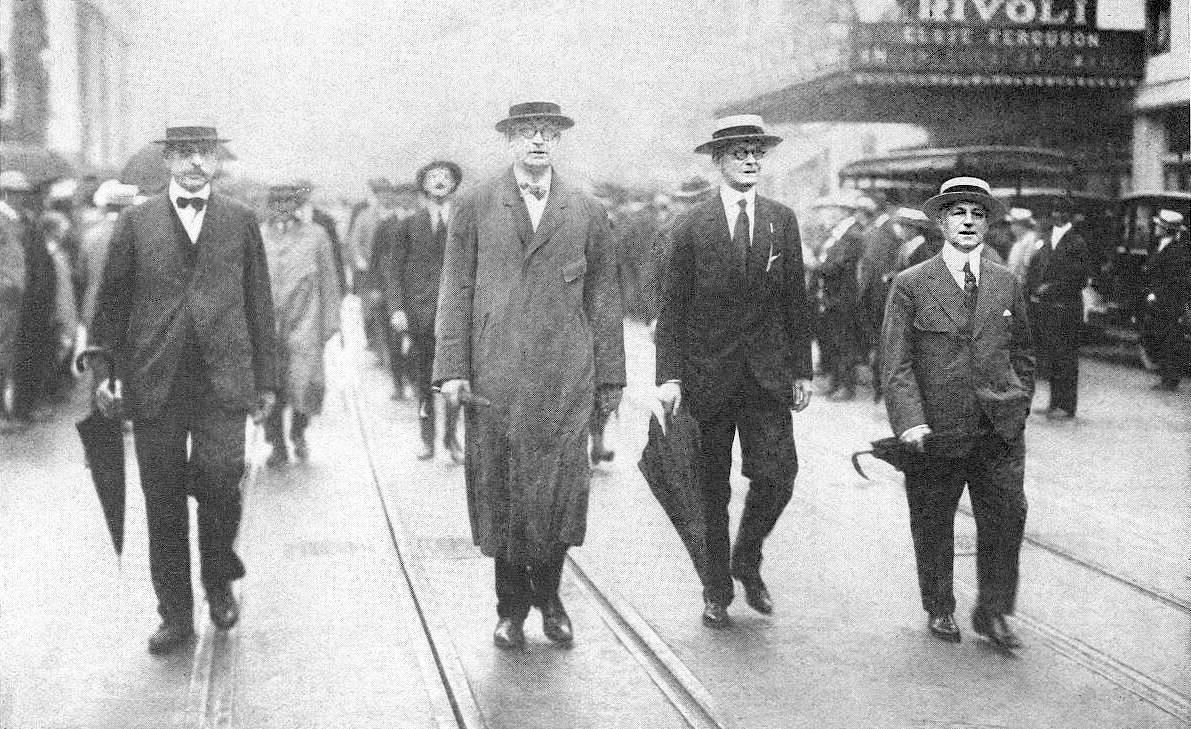
Actors' Equity president Francis Wilson (right) marching with other AEA leaders during the 1919 strike

During the strike, the actors used a number of techniques to reach the people and pressure the managers. Not only did thousands of players walk out, but they also picketed the closed theaters. In New York, hundreds of Equity members could be found outside closed theaters every night waving banners and delivering speeches about the injustices committed by the managers. The strikers consistently spoke to the press and held parades in order to cultivate public support. One of the most famous parades occurred on Wall Street; it consisted of fifteen cars full of well-dressed, leading actresses driven by prominent actors. Strikers' banners read "No More Pay, Just Fair Play." Bystanders cheered the actors and actresses on.

=== Benefit performances ===
In order to raise money for the strike, Equity put on benefit shows at the Lexington Avenue Opera House. On August 16, there was a parade down Broadway to support the first benefit show on August 18. Many well-known stars participated in the performances: W.C. Fields acted as master of ceremonies, Lionel and Ethel Barrymore performed the second act of The Lady of the Camellias, and Marie Dressler led a dance routine. Many other prominent actors, including Eddie Foy, Pearl White, and Ed Wynn, also performed. By the end of the first show, Equity had raised a profit of $31,000. These performances continued for a week and the house was full nearly every night.

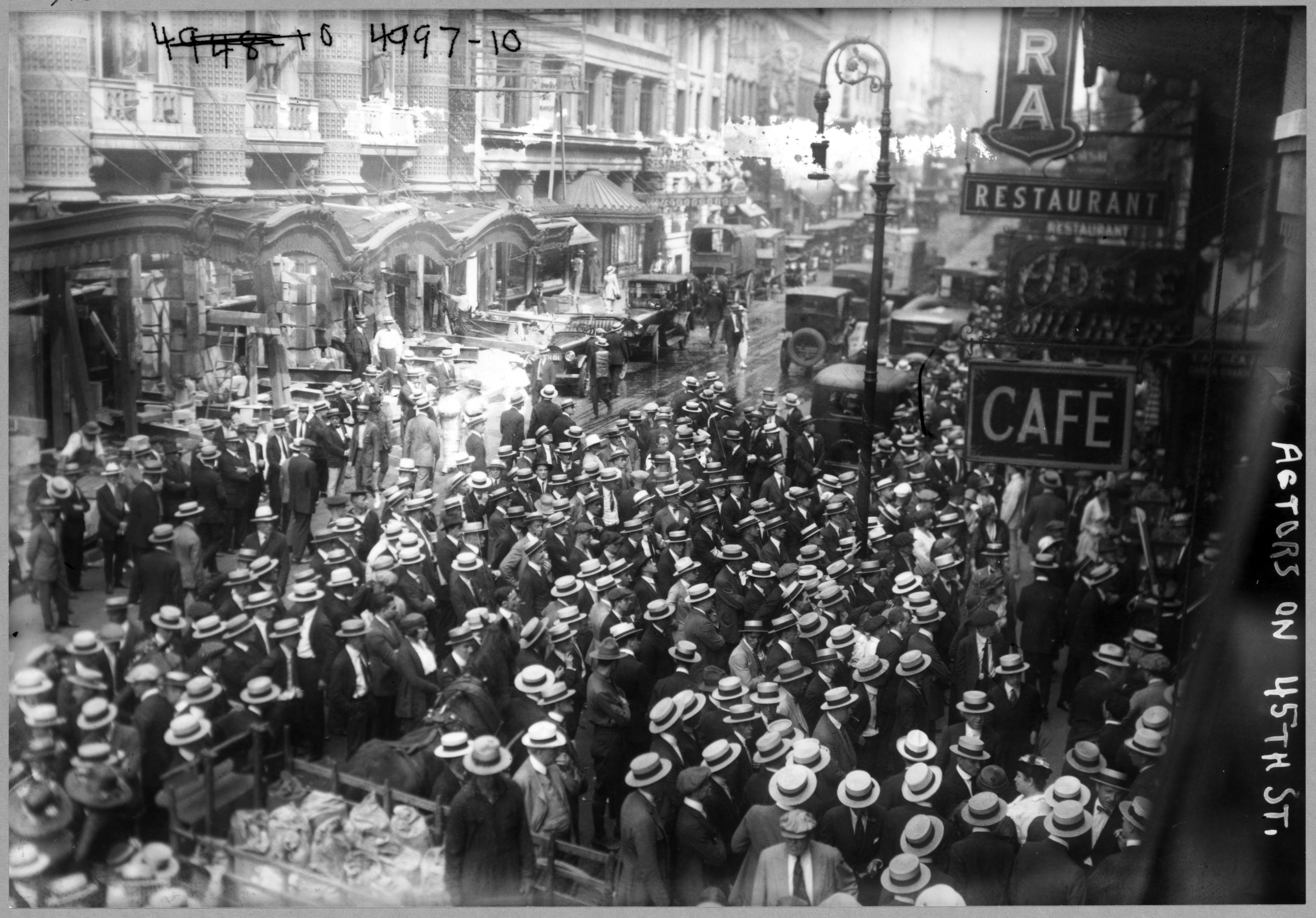
Actors' strike, New York, NYC

=== AFL involvement ===
During the benefit performance on August 26, Samuel Gompers, AFL founder and president, unexpectedly appeared on stage and gave a speech assuring Equity members that they had the AFL's full support.

Whatever influence or power there may be in the great American Federation of Labor to help you, rest assured that power and influence is behind you until the end.

— Samuel Gompers, speech to Equity members during 1919 strike

The AFL soon demonstrated their power. After his appearance at the Equity benefit performance, Gompers met with the AFL's executive counsel in Washington, D.C. Shortly after, the AFL shut down the Hippodrome Theatre, which had been left alone by Equity because the theatre was a vaudeville house. $37,000 had to be refunded to 6,000 theatregoers as a result of this shutdown.

=== Conclusion of the strike ===
After receiving overwhelming support from the AFL, public, press, and unions all over the country, Equity declared victory on September 6, 1919. On this day, the PMA and Equity signed a five-year contract that included most of Equity's demands. All PMA members were required to use AEA contracts. Managers would pay the actors for overtime and rehearsals as well as travel and costumes. The contract also decided that eight shows would constitute a full week's work and established Saturday as the official payday. Finally, the PMA agreed to lift all of the blacklists and lawsuits they had initiated during the strike.

The news made headlines across the country. The strike had lasted 30 days and resulted in 37 closed productions, 16 prevented openings, and an estimated loss of $2 million to the theatre industry. By the end of the strike, Equity's membership had grown from a couple thousand members to 14,000 members, and its treasury had grown from $13,500 to $120,000.

== Impact ==
The strike changed the definition of labor. Before the strike, neither actors nor the public viewed stage actors as workers, and few thought it even possible for them to organize. However, when actors realized that a union was necessary, the way that actors and acting were viewed began to shift. Instead of believing that they as "artists" were above "laborers," both actors themselves and the public began to consider their work as labor. The creation of Equity and their successful 1919 strike broke the perceived class barrier between the actor and the industrial worker. This shift was noted in a New Republic article, "Acting as a Trade," prior to the strike. The article stated that the managers "gave [the actors] the short end of every contract," as the actors "hugged their romantic pride," unwilling to identify themselves as laborers. The article also said that because the actors faced the same hardships as the working man, they would need to adopt the means of the working man in order to be successful.

Equity's victory in the 1919 strike cleared doubts about the ability of actors and actresses to successfully organize. Actors had some differences that separated them from other unions: actors were constantly on the road rehearsing and performing shows, and there were large disparities between members of Equity in regard to status and salary. Historian Sean P. Holmes noted that the wealth of resources available to the theatre manager in comparison to the actor and the divisions within the acting community itself stacked the odds against the AEA in their battle with the managers. Though it had been thought impossible for actors to organize and strike successfully due to both the logistical difficulties they faced and their initial, negative attitudes towards organized labor, they were able to achieve their goals by means of organizing. Equity's success also encouraged other unions within the industry to form, such as the Chorus Equity Association, which was created five days after the start of the strike by Follies chorus members after they learned that their manager had joined the PMA.
