= United States Army Border Air Patrol =

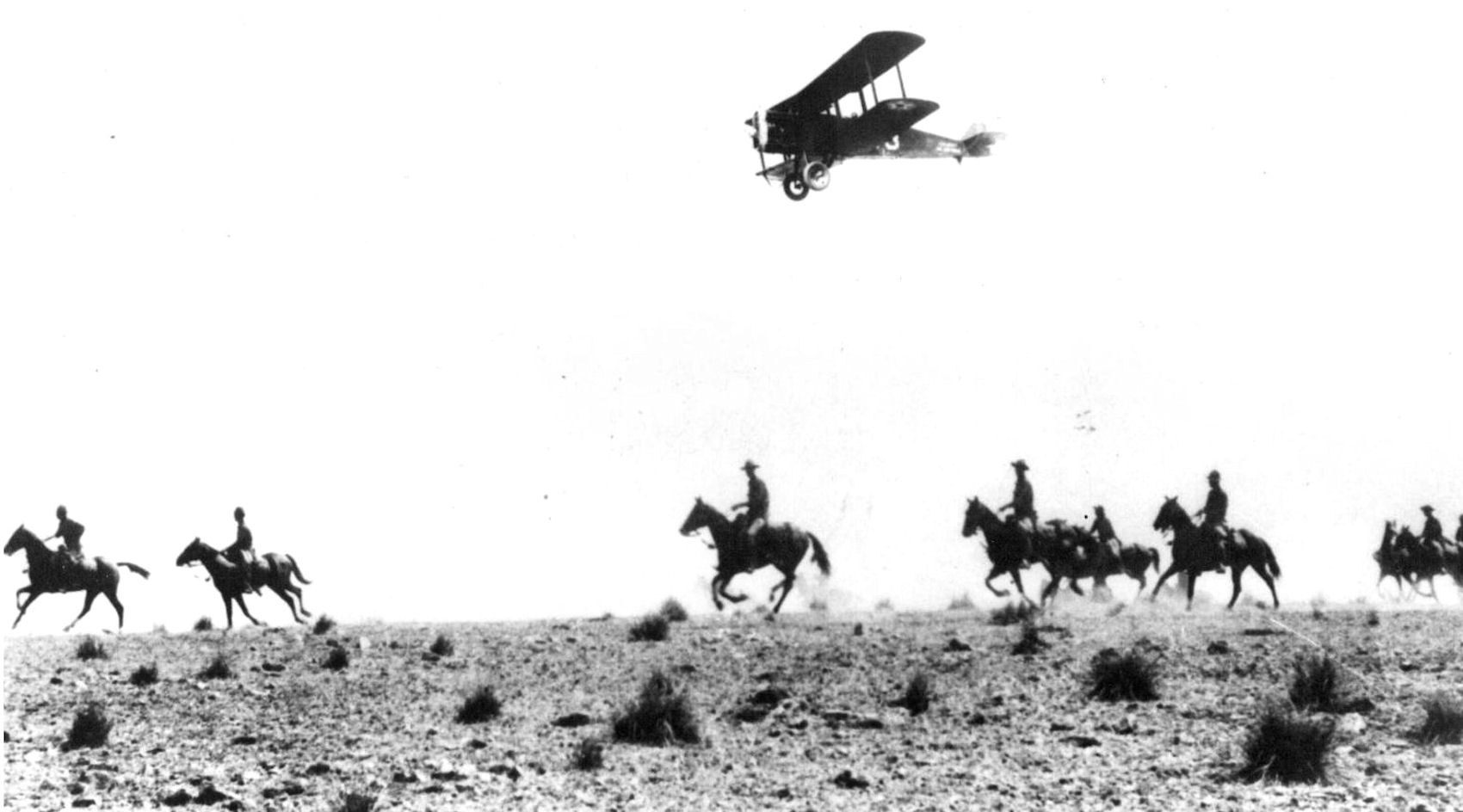
- 12th Aero Squadron Dayton-Wright DH-4 flying liaison with US Cavalry on United States/Mexico border patrol
- Active: June 1919 – July 1921
- Country: United States of America
- Branch: United States Army
- Type: Air force
- Role: Aerial warfare
- Size: By mid-September 1919 the force was 104 officers, 491 enlisted men, and 67 planes
- Engagements: Mexican Revolution; Bandit War

Commanders
- Notable commanders: Lt. Col. Henry B. Clagett

The United States Army Border Air Patrol was a program for aerial reconnaissance and border security that ran from 1919 to 1921 primarily on the Mexico–United States border. With the end of World War I in 1918, the Air Service, United States Army was largely demobilized. During the demobilization period of 1919, the US Army and its air arm were deployed to the southern border to prevent and combat raids from Mexico. The program also sought to halt smuggling of illegal aliens and narcotics into the United States and weapons from the United States into Mexico.

== Background ==
Revolution and disorder in Mexico and trouble along the Mexico–United States border in March 1913 brought on the hurried organization of the 1st Aero Squadron, the U.S. Army's first tactical unit equipped with airplanes. In 1916 the squadron took part in General Pershing’s Punitive Expedition into Mexico in pursuit of Mexican revolutionist Pancho Villa.

Difficulties along the border continued during World War I while the United States was at war in Europe. Mexican bandits often raided American ranches to secure supplies, cattle, and horses, and in doing so sometimes killed the ranchers. U.S. troops stationed along the border shot raiders as they pursued them into Mexico. The biggest clash came in August 1918, when more than 800 American troops fought some 600 Mexicans near Nogales, Arizona.

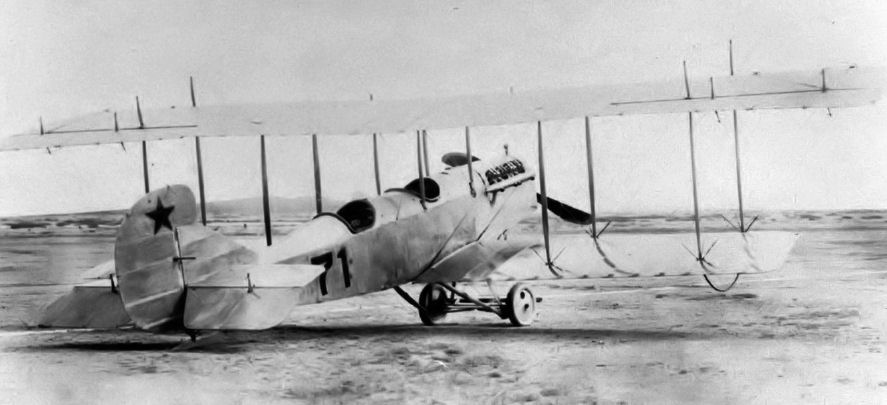
A 1st Aero Squadron Curtiss R–2, Signal Corps No. 71, at Columbus, New Mexico, 1916.

Border patrol was one of the many activities being considered for the postwar United States Army Air Service. However, no aviation units had been assigned to duty on the Mexican border, when a large force of Villistas moved northward in June 1919 toward Ciudad Juarez, Chihuahua, Mexico (opposite El Paso, Texas), garrisoned by Mexican government forces. Major General DeRosey C. Cabell, Commanding General of the Army Southern Department, received orders to seal off the border if Villa took Juarez. If the Villistas tired across the border, Cabell was to cross into Mexico, disperse Villa's troops, and withdraw as soon as the safety of El Paso was assured. The general ordered Air Service men and planes from Kelly Field and Ellington Field, Texas, to Fort Bliss, near El Paso, for border patrol.

American troops under Brig. Gen. James B. Erwin, Commander of the El Paso District of the Southern Department, were on alert when about 1,600 of Villa's men attacked Juarez during the night of 14/15 June 1919. Stray fire from across the river killed an American soldier and a civilian, and wounded two other soldiers and four civilians. Around 3,600 U.S. troops crossed into Mexico, quickly dispersed the Villistas, and returned to the American side.

== Air Service surveillance mission ==
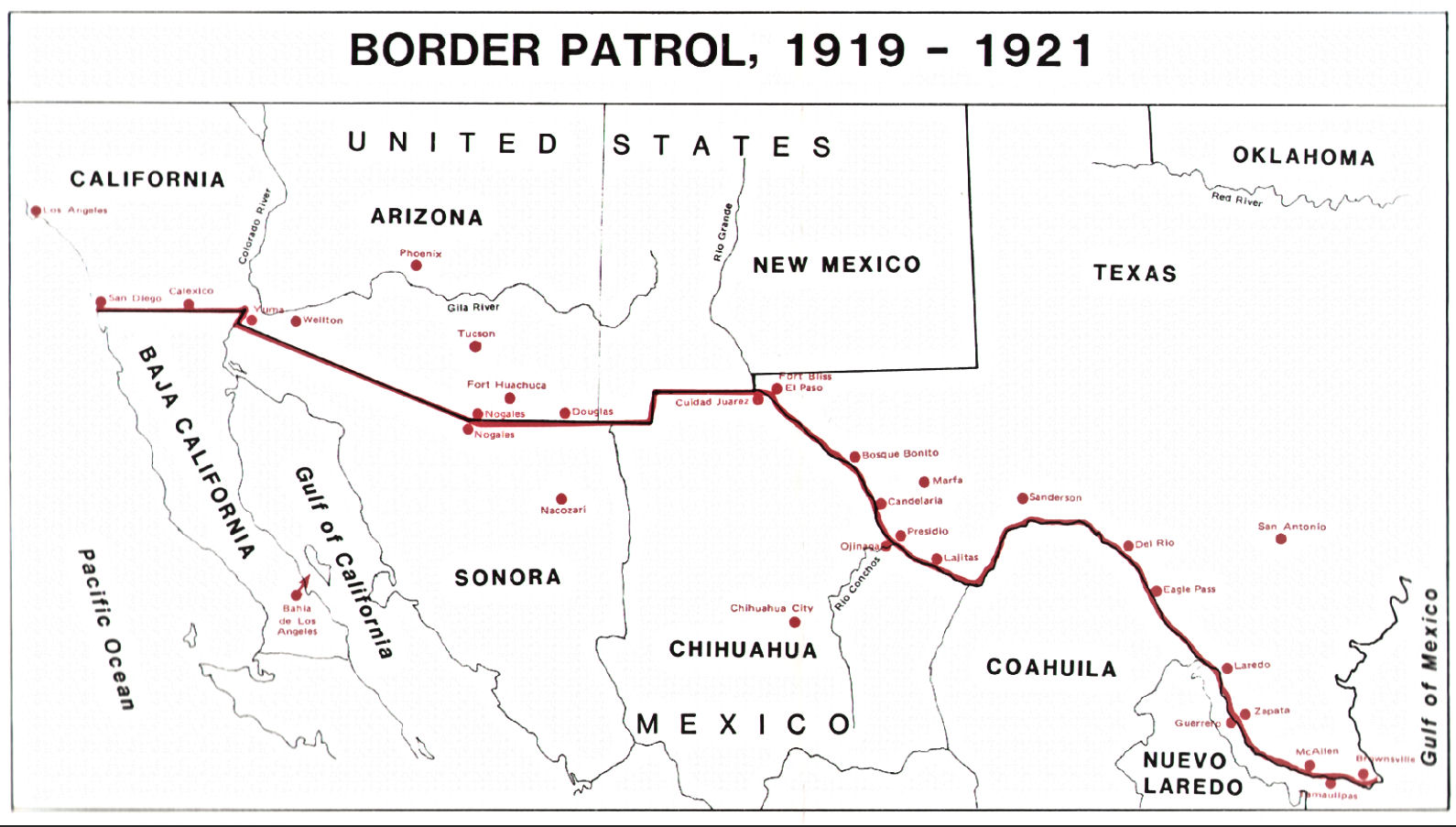
United States Army Air Service Mexican Border Patrol Map, 1919–1921.

As a result of this incident, Air Service personnel equipped with war surplus Dayton-Wright DH-4 aircraft were ordered to Fort Bliss, Texas, on 15 June. Major Edgar G. Tobin, an ace who had flown with the 103d Aero Squadron in France, inaugurated an aerial patrol on the border on the 19th. By mid-September the force grew to 104 officers, 491 enlisted men, and 67 planes from the 8th Surveillance Squadron, 9th Corps Observation Squadron, 11th Aero Squadron, 90th Aero Squadron and the 96th Aero Squadron.

In the summer of 1919, the Air Service planned to assign at least nine Aero Squadrons and one Airship Company for surveillance of the entire Mexican border from the Gulf of Mexico to the Pacific Ocean. The original plan called for two Observation Squadrons (the 9th and 91st) of the Western Department to patrol eastward from Rockwell Field, California, to the California-Arizona line. Three Surveillance Squadrons (the 8th, 90th, and 104th) and four Bombardment Squadrons (the 1lth, 20th, 96th, and 166th) of the Southern Department were to be distributed along the border from Arizona to the Gulf of Mexico.

On 1 July 1919, three surveillance squadrons were organized into the Army Surveillance Group (ASG) headquartered at Kelly Field. In September the four bombardment squadrons formed the 1st Day Bombardment Group, also with headquarters at Kelly Field. In addition the 1st Pursuit Group and its squadrons (27th, 94th, 95th, and 147th) were moved from Selfridge Field, Michigan, to Kelly at the end of August to be available if needed. The three groups (surveillance, day bombardment, and pursuit) comprised the 1st Wing at Kelly. Commanded by Lt. Col. Henry B. Clagett, the 1st Wing became responsible for aerial patrol of the border in the Southern Department. Also in August, work started on a large steel hangar for an airship station at Camp Owen Bierne, Fort Bliss (which later became part of Biggs Field).

=== Operations ===
The Air Service soon scaled down the plan for border patrol. Although minor incidents continued to occur, Pancho Villa never succeeded in rebuilding his forces. The major threat had been dispelled by the time aerial patrol began. From January 1920 on, the mission of the Mexican Border Patrol in the Southern Department was assigned to the 1st Surveillance Group that had moved its headquarters to Fort Bliss and gained an extra squadron, the 12th. The group's squadrons operated in two flights, each patrolling a sector on either side of its operating base.

From the Gulf of Mexico westward, the deployment was as follows:

- 8th Aero (later Surveillance, later Squadron) (Attack)

Headquarters, Kelly Field, San Antonio, Texas, 25 May 1919

Flight operated from: McAllen Field, Texas, after 25 July 1919

Headquarters moved to: McAllen Field, Texas, 13 August 1919

Flight operated from: Laredo Field, Texas, 15 August 1919

Squadron re-combined at: Kelly Field, Texas, 2 July 1921

The 8th's patrol sector was from the mouth of the Rio Grande at the Gulf of Mexico to Eagle Pass, Texas.

- 90th Squadron (Surveillance)

Headquarters, Kelly Field, San Antonio, Texas, 15 May 1919

Flight A operated from: Eagle Pass Field, Texas, 27 August 1919
Flight B operated from: Kelly Field No. 2, Texas, 30 September-29 November 1919

Headquarters moved to: Sanderson Field, Texas, 29 November 1919

Flight A operated from: Eagle Pass Field, Texas, to 12 June 1920
Flight A operated from: Del Rio Field, Texas, 12 June 1920 – 30 June 1921

Squadron re-combined at: Kelly Field, Texas, 2 July 1921

The 90th's patrol sector was from Eagle Pass to Lajitas, Texas.

- 104th Surveillance Squadron (later 13th Squadron (Attack)), 25 May 1919

Headquarters, Kelly Field, San Antonio, Texas, 1 June 1919
Headquarters, Fort Bliss, Texas, 6 November 1919

Flight operated from: Marfa Field, Texas, 6 November 1919 – 3 September 1920
Flight operated from: Marfa Field, Texas, 17 November 1920 – 30 June 1921

Squadron re-combined at: Kelly Field, Texas, 2 July 1921

The 13th's patrol sector was from Lajitas to El Paso, Texas

- 12th Aero, (later 12th Squadron (Observation) )

Headquarters, Fort Bliss, El Paso, Texas, 9 January 1920

Flight operated from: Douglas Field, Arizona from 10 January 1920

Headquarters moved to: Nogales Field, Arizona, 12 April 1920

Flight operated from: Douglas Field, Arizona from 12 April 1920

Headquarters moved to: Douglas Field, Arizona, 1 February 1921

Flight operated from: Nogales Field, Arizona from 1 February 1921

Squadron re-combined at Biggs Field, Texas, 28 September 1921

The 12th's patrol sector was from El Paso, Texas to Yuma, Arizona

Western Department Area:

- 9th Corps Observation Squadron

Operated from: March Field and Rockwell Field, California, 22 July 1919 – 27 April 1920

Flight operated from Calexico Field, California, 22 July 1919 – 1 April 1920

- 91st Aero (later 91st) Squadron

Operated from: Ream Field, California, 24 January 1920

Flight, or detachment thereof, operated from El Centro Field and Calexico Field, California, 17 March – 30 July 1920

Squadron re-combined at: Rockwell Field, California, 30 April 1920

Both the 9th and 91st patrolled from the Pacific Coast at San Diego along the border to Yuma, Arizona.

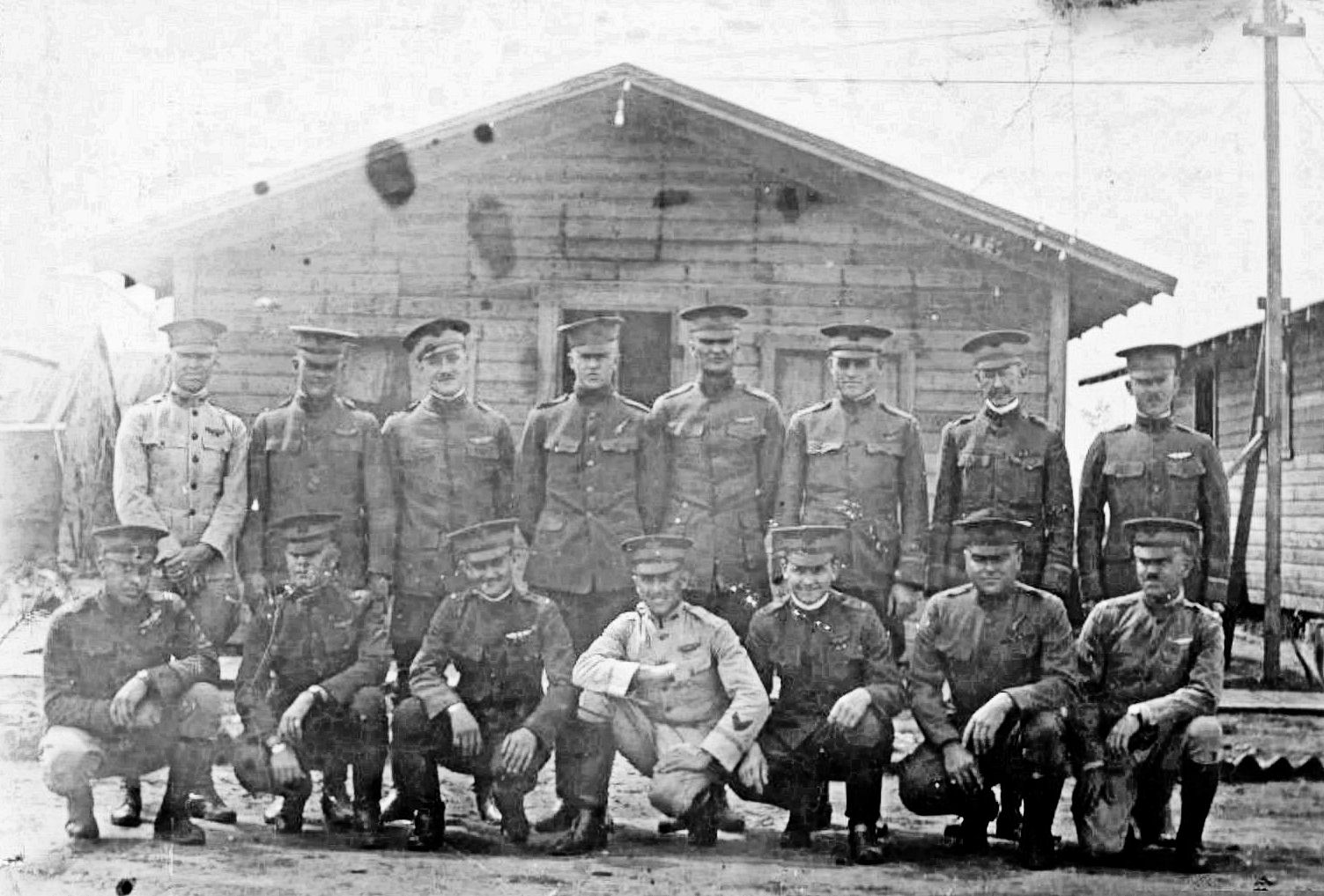
Officers of the 8th Surveillance Squadron – McAllen Field Texas, 1920

The border patrol mission started with DH-4s and Curtiss JN-4 Jennies, with both eventually replaced with updated Dayton-Wright DH-4Bs. Most of the first planes were not properly equipped for field service. Not knowing what turn events on the border might take, the Army wanted the planes ready for any eventuality. Colonel James E. Fechet, Air Service Officer at the Southern Department, found it no easy task to obtain bomb racks, machine gun mounts, cameras, and other equipment. There was a delay, for example, in installing synchronized Martin guns because parts supplied with the guns did not fit the planes on the border. The radios on some planes could send only in code and could not do that very well. Compasses were unreliable, maps sketchy and of little use. The country over which the men had to fly was wild and rough and sparsely populated, with few places for safe emergency landings.

Air Service squadrons flew along the border searching for bands of men and reported to the nearest cavalry post how many men they were, where they were, which way they were heading, what they were doing, and how many horses and cattle they had. The timing of the patrols varied so raiders would not know when the next plane would appear.

=== Airfields ===
The patrol bases were hurriedly created. One of the young lieutenants who flew from Marfa Field in the summer of 1919 remembered the flying field as a pasture at the eastern edge of town. Its five hangars were made from canvas. A double row of ten or twelve tents served as officer and enlisted quarters and sheltered flight headquarters and supply. The lieutenant, Stacy C. Hinkle, recalled his tour of duty on the border as “a life of hardship, possible death, starvation pay, and a lonely life without social contacts, in hot, barren desert wastes, tortured by sun, wind, and sand.” The boredom was as bad as the physical hardship and discomfort, the sole recreation being drinking and gambling. Even so, Hinkle thought the airmen better off than the poor fellows at cavalry outposts up and down the border.

Primary airfields used in the Border Patrol mission were:

- Calexico Field, California

32°40′10″N 115°30′48″W

- Del Rio Field, Texas

29°22′37″N 100°49′12″W

- Douglas Field, Arizona

31°20′33″N 109°30′23″W

- Eagle Pass Field, Texas

28°42′08″N 100°28′54″W

- El Centro Field, California

33°59′20″N 117°24′36″W

- Fort Bliss, Texas

31°50′58″N 106°22′48″W

- Kelly Field, Texas

29°22′59″N 098°34′50″W

- March Field, California

33°52′50″N 117°15′34″W

- Marfa Field, Texas

30°19′24″N 103°59′33″W

- McAllen Field, Texas

26°10′33″N 098°14′19″W

- Nogales Field, Arizona

31°25′03″N 110°50′52″W

- Ream Field, California

32°33′48″N 117°06′42″W

- Rockwell Field, California

32°41′48″N 117°11′49″W

- Sanderson Field, Texas

30°08′31″N 102°24′11″W

Secondary airfields used on an as-needed bases, without garrisons, were at Bosque Bonite, Texas; Brownsville, Texas; Candelaria, Texas; Columbus Airfield, New Mexico; Fort Huachuca, Arizona; Lajitas, Texas; McAllen, Texas; Wellton, Arizona; Yuma, Arizona. and Zapata, Texas.

=== Border incidents ===
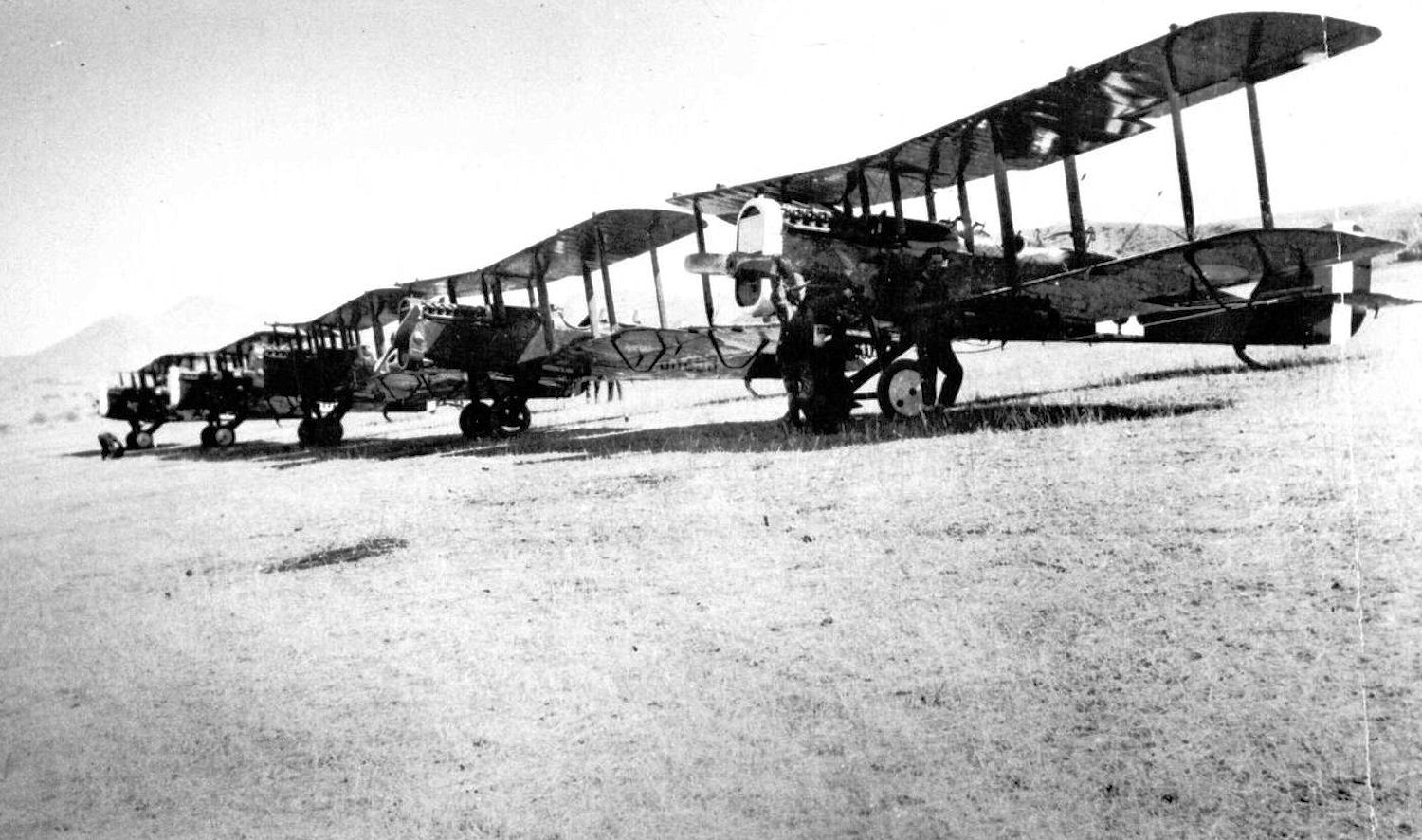
12th Aero Squadron at Camp Little near Nogales, Arizona, 1920

Pilots flying along or near the border were under orders not to cross. But they often got lost and strayed into Mexico. At times they went over deliberately, apparently on the spur of the moment. Occasionally, they crossed to carry out a special assignment.

Addressing the National Congress of Mexico on 1 September 1919, President Venustiano Carranza said U.S. military planes had crossed the frontier several times. While his government had protested, the incursions had been repeated. The Mexican president was probably not aware that one of the flights violating Mexico's sovereignty had been made by the ranking pilot of the U.S. Air Service. Inspecting the border patrol in July 1919, General Billy Mitchell had taken Colonel Selah H.R. "Tommy" Tompkins, 7th Cavalry Commander, for a reconnaissance.

==== Chihuahua city flyovers ====
In fact, the day President Carranza addressed the Mexican Congress, Ignacio Bonillas, Mexican Ambassador to the United States, protested the flight of two Air Service planes over Chihuahua City, during the afternoon of August 28. James B. Stewart, American Consul in Chihuahua, had already reported the incident. Soon Stewart was back with another dispatch and Bonillas was protesting again-more American planes had flown over Chihuahua on 2 September. Two more planes showed up in the morning of the 5th. When Stewart said these incidents embarrassed members of the American colony, Acting Secretary of State William Phillips replied: “War Department promises to issue strict orders against repetitions.“

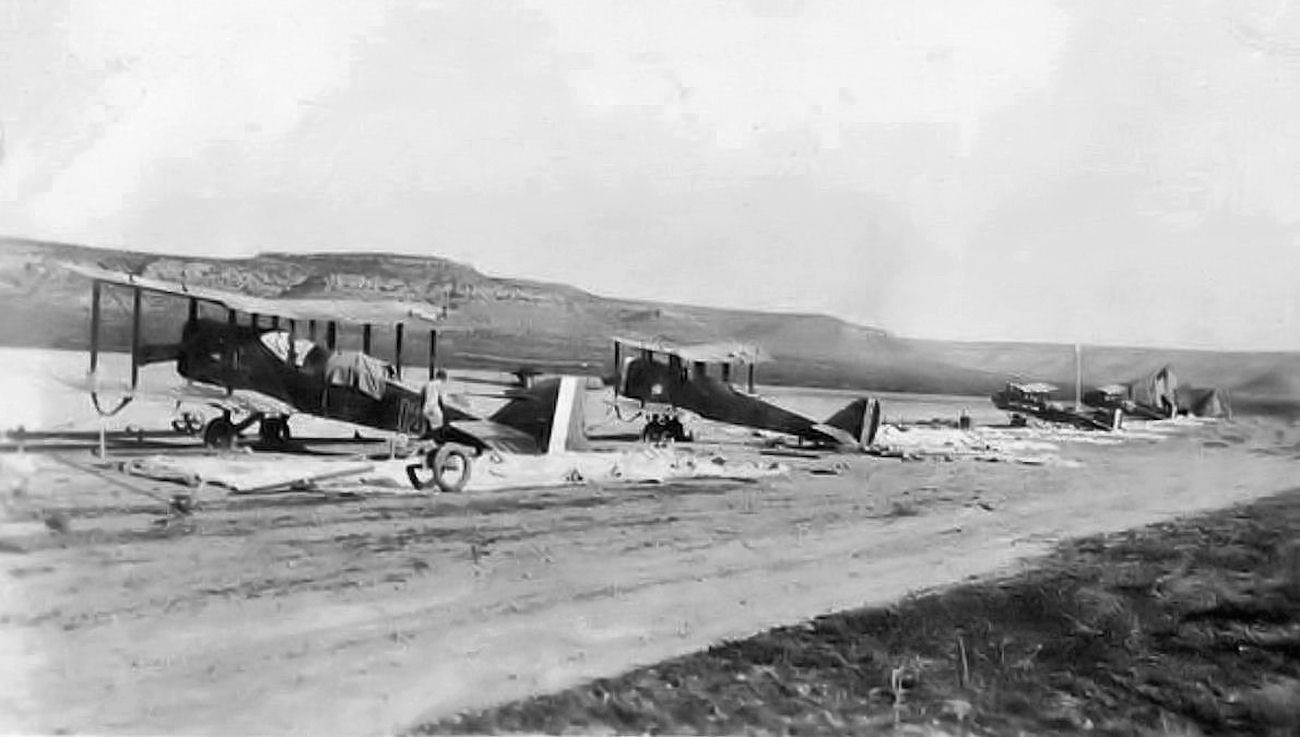
90th Squadron (Attack) – Dayton-Wright DH-4s, Sanderson Field, Texas, 1919

Not long afterward, Ambassador Bonillas complained that the crew of an Air Service airplane had fired a machine gun several times while flying over Nogales, Arizona. Some of the shots hit a dwelling across the border in Nogales, Sonora, luckily without injuring anyone. The Mexican government wanted the guilty persons found and punished. Several weeks later the State Department responded that an Air Service lieutenant was being tried by general court-martial for the shooting.

==== Candelaria border incursion of 1919 ====
Another incident protested by the Mexican government began with two Americans getting lost while on a routine flight in the Big Bend area of Texas on Sunday morning, 10 August 1919. When their plane crashed in Mexico they ended up getting kidnapped on 13 August by a Villista desperado named Jesus Renteria. The bandit sent the ransom note to a rancher at Candelaria, along with telegrams that he forced the airmen to write to their fathers and the Secretary of War, the Commanding General of the Southern Department, and the commanding officer of U.S. forces in the Big Bend District. Renteria demanded $15,000 not later than Monday, 18 August, or the two Americans would be killed.

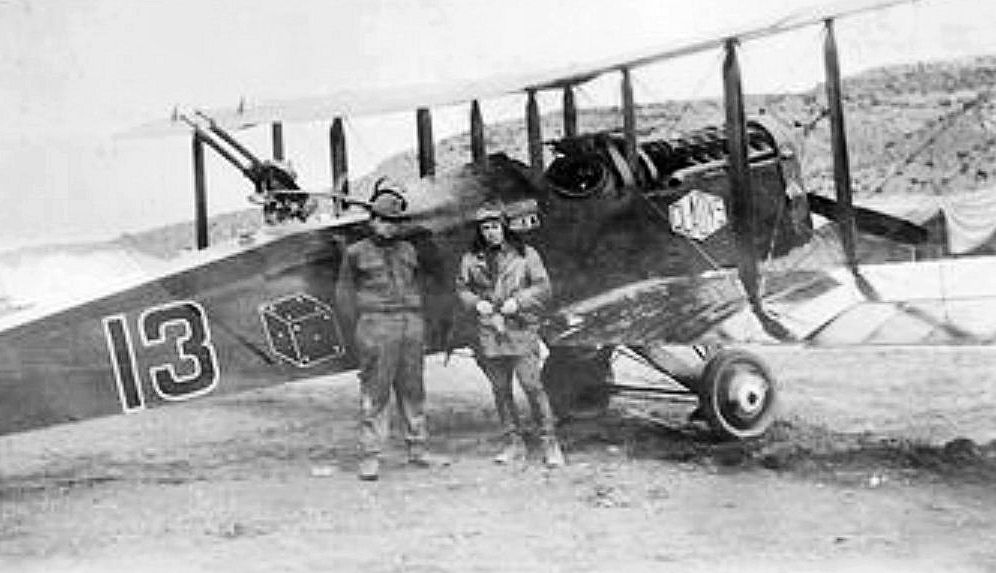
90th Squadron (Attack) – Dayton-Wright DH-4, Sanderson Field, Texas, 1919

The ransom was paid for one of officers but when Matlack took the remaining $7,500 to get Lieutenant Davis. On the way to the rendezvous he overheard two of Renteria's men talking about killing him and Davis as soon as the rest of the ransom money was paid. At the rendezvous, Matlack pulled a gun, told the Mexicans to tell Renteria to “go to hell,” and rode off with Davis and the money. Avoiding the ambush, Matlack and Davis safely crossed into the United States.

At daybreak on Tuesday, August 19, 1919, Captain Matlack once again crossed the border, this time leading Troops C and K, 8th Cavalry, in pursuit of Renteria and his gang. Air Service planes scouted ahead of the cavalry seeking to spot the bandits. They also gathered information on the condition of the trails and the location of waterholes, and conveyed it to the troops by dropping messages.

==== Seizure of plane by Mexico ====
A few months later another plane landed in Mexico after its crew followed the wrong railroad tracks. Patrolling on Monday, 2 February 1920, 1st Lts. Leroy M. Wolfe and George L. Usher intended to pick up the El Paso and Southwestern Railroad west of Douglas, Arizona, and follow it to Nogales. Visibility was poor and the compass did not work properly. Sighting a railroad, Wolfe and Usher followed it for some time until it ended. Lost and having engine trouble, they landed and were taken into custody by Mexican officials. The tracks they had steered by ran due south instead of west, and had led them to Nacozari, Sonora, seventy-five or eighty miles below the border. Though treated well, Wolfe and Usher were not set free until 2 February. They waited three more days for release of their airplane, shipping it to Douglas by train.

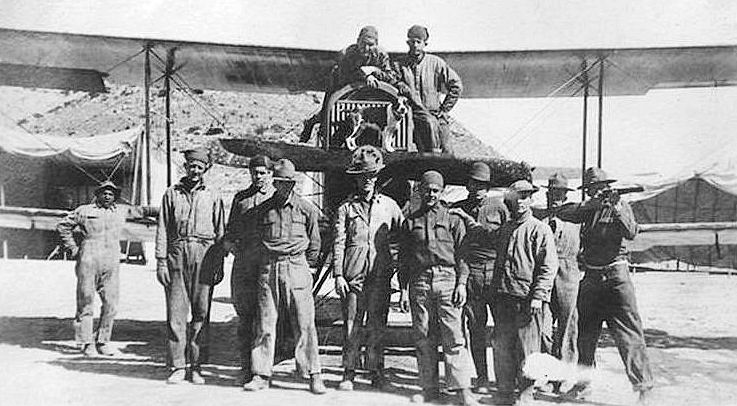
De Havilland DH-4 bomber with members of the 90th Squadron (Surveillance) at Sanderson Field, Texas, ca 1920.

==== Crash in Baja ====
On border patrol with the 9th Corps Observation Squadron, Lts. Frederick Waterhouse and Cecil H. Connolly disappeared after taking off from Calexico Field, California, bound for Rockwell Field, on 20 August 1919. A search begun the next morning gradually extended farther and farther south in Baja California. When three weeks passed with no trace of the missing men, the search ended. A month later it was learned their bodies had been found near Bahía de los Ángeles on the coast of the Gulf of California, 225 miles south of Calexico.

From the evidence that could be gathered, it appeared Waterhouse and Connolly became lost in a rainstorm and hugged the coast of Baja California southward, thinking they were headed north along the Pacific Coast. They landed safely on the beach about twenty miles north of Bahia de Los Angeles. Their sole chance for survival seemed to be staying with the plane until found. Tortured by heat, thirst, and hunger, they waited seventeen days, but the search never reached that far south. Finally two fishermen came along and took them in a canoe to Bahia de Los Angeles. There the Americans were murdered, apparently for the little money they had. Their bodies, buried in the sand, were discovered within a day or two by an American geological survey party and rediscovered a week later by an American mining engineer. The news, however, did not reach Rockwell Field until 13 October. Three days later, a Navy ship, USS Aaron Ward, sailed from San Diego with a group of Army officers to recover the bodies.

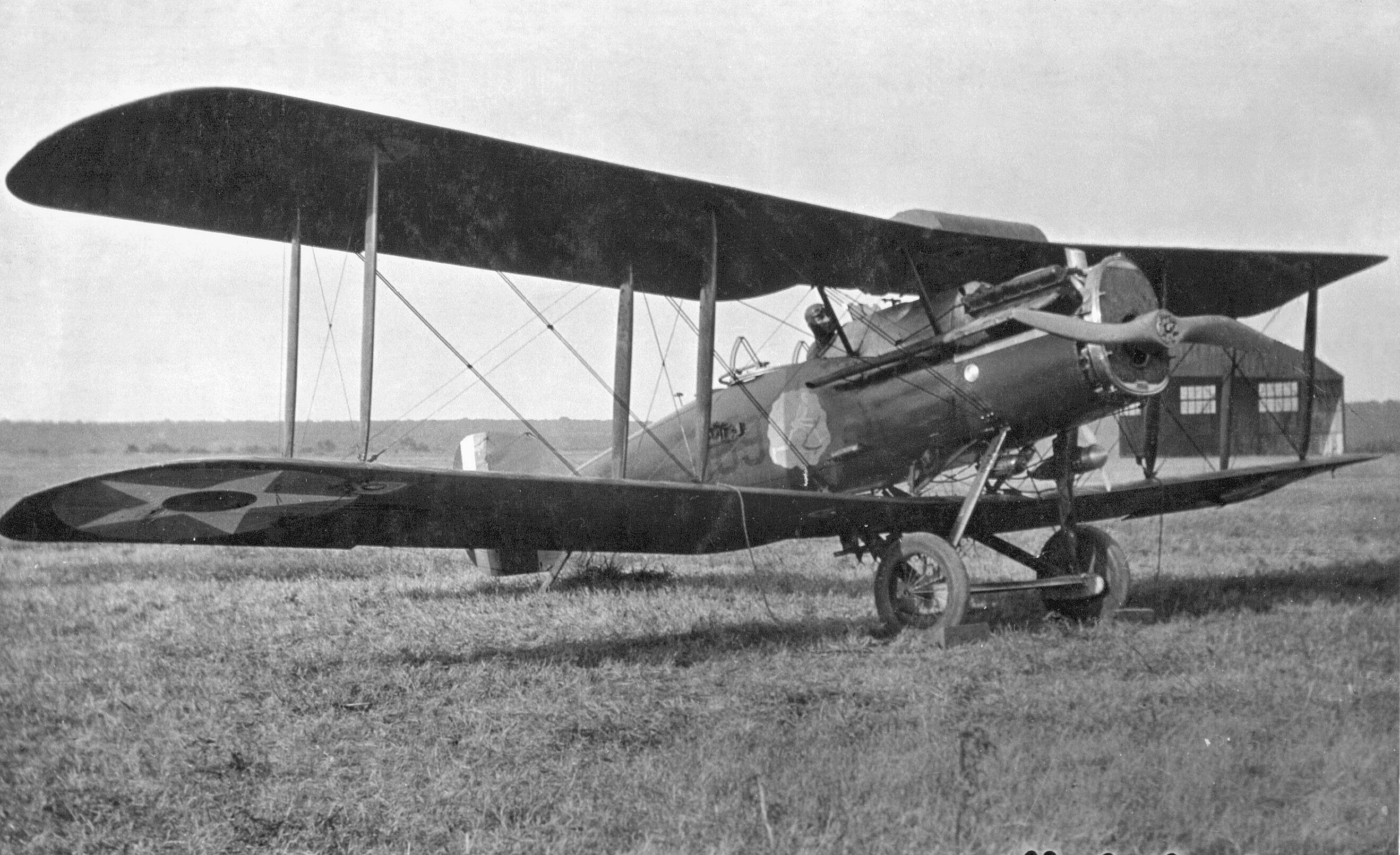
Experimental 13th Squadron (Attack) – Dayton-Wright XB-1A, at Kelly Field, Texas, Used in the Border Patrol

=== Conclusion ===
As time went on, air border units spent less time on patrol and more in training with the Army infantry, artillery, and cavalry units. Air Service personnel further practiced aerial gunnery and formation flying, experimented with radio and other signaling systems, located and marked emergency landing fields, and worked to upgrade facilities and equipment.

At first, units tried to cover their sectors every day. Later, the number and seriousness of border violations by Mexicans decreased, and the patrols tapered off. In the autumn of 1920, the schedule for the 1st Surveillance Group called for flights twice a week. When exercises with ground forces or other activities interfered, patrols might be canceled for days or even weeks at a time. Brig. Gen. William Mitchell’s need for men and planes from the border for bombing tests against naval vessels off the Virginia Capes in June 1921 brought border patrol to an end.

== See also ==
- United States Army Air Service (May 24, 1918 – July 2, 1926)

== Bibliography ==
Notes

References

- Clay, Steven E. (2010). US Army Order of Battle, 1919-1941, Volume 2 (PDF). Fort Leavenworth, Kansas: Combat Studies Institute Press. ISBN 9780984190140. Archived from the original (PDF) on 27 September 2013.
- Hinkle, Stacy C. (1967). Wings and Saddles: The Air and Cavalry Punitive Expedition of 1919. El Paso: Texas Western Press.
- Hinkle, Stacy C. (1970). Wings Over the Border: The Army Air Service Armed Patrol of the United States-Mexico Border, 1919-1921. Texas Western Press. - Total pages: 67
- Maurer, Maurer (1987). Aviation in the U.S. Army, 1919-1939. Office of Air Force History, U.S. Air Force. ISBN 9780912799384. - Total pages: 626
