= Candelaria border incursion of 1919 =

US military invasion of Mexico, 1919

- Part of the Mexican Revolution and the Bandit War
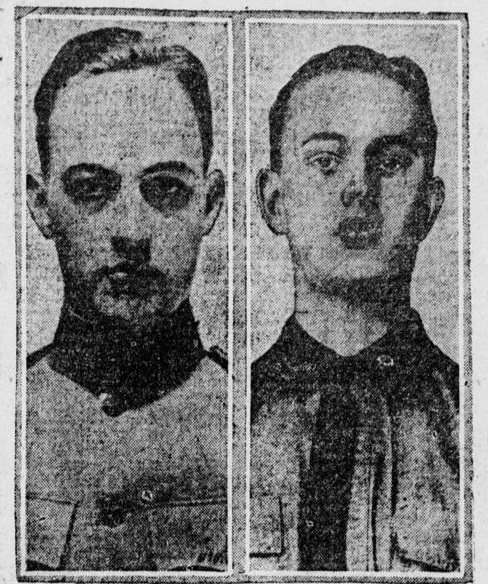
- Lt Harold G. Peterson, pilot, and Paul H. Davis, Observer-Gunner
Date	August 13–23, 1919
Location	Rio Grande border states
Result	U.S. victory

Belligerents
Mexico: Mexican Bandits	United States: 8th Cavalry Regiment

Commanders and leaders
Jesús Rentería †	General Dickman; Captain Leonard F. Matlack

Casualties and losses
At least 4 killed, including Jesús Rentería	

The Candelaria border incursion of 1919 was a US military invasion of Mexico to find and kill a Mexican bandit group led by Jesús Rentería. Rentería had kidnapped two United States Army Border Air Patrol pilots that had crashed south of the US-Mexican border and successfully ransomed them back to the United States.

== Background ==
The U.S. and Mexico had for almost a decade seen a number of violent incidents on their border related to the Mexican Revolution and the Bandit War. As recently as June 1919 U.S. and Mexican forces skirmished near El Paso, Texas, on the border in what was known as the Battle of Ciudad Juárez. This conflict is singular for the fact that the Mexican army and the U.S. Army joined forces to fight the Villista revolutionary faction led by Pancho Villa. It was the second-largest battle of the Mexican Revolution involving the United States, and is considered the last battle of the Border War.

== Incursion ==
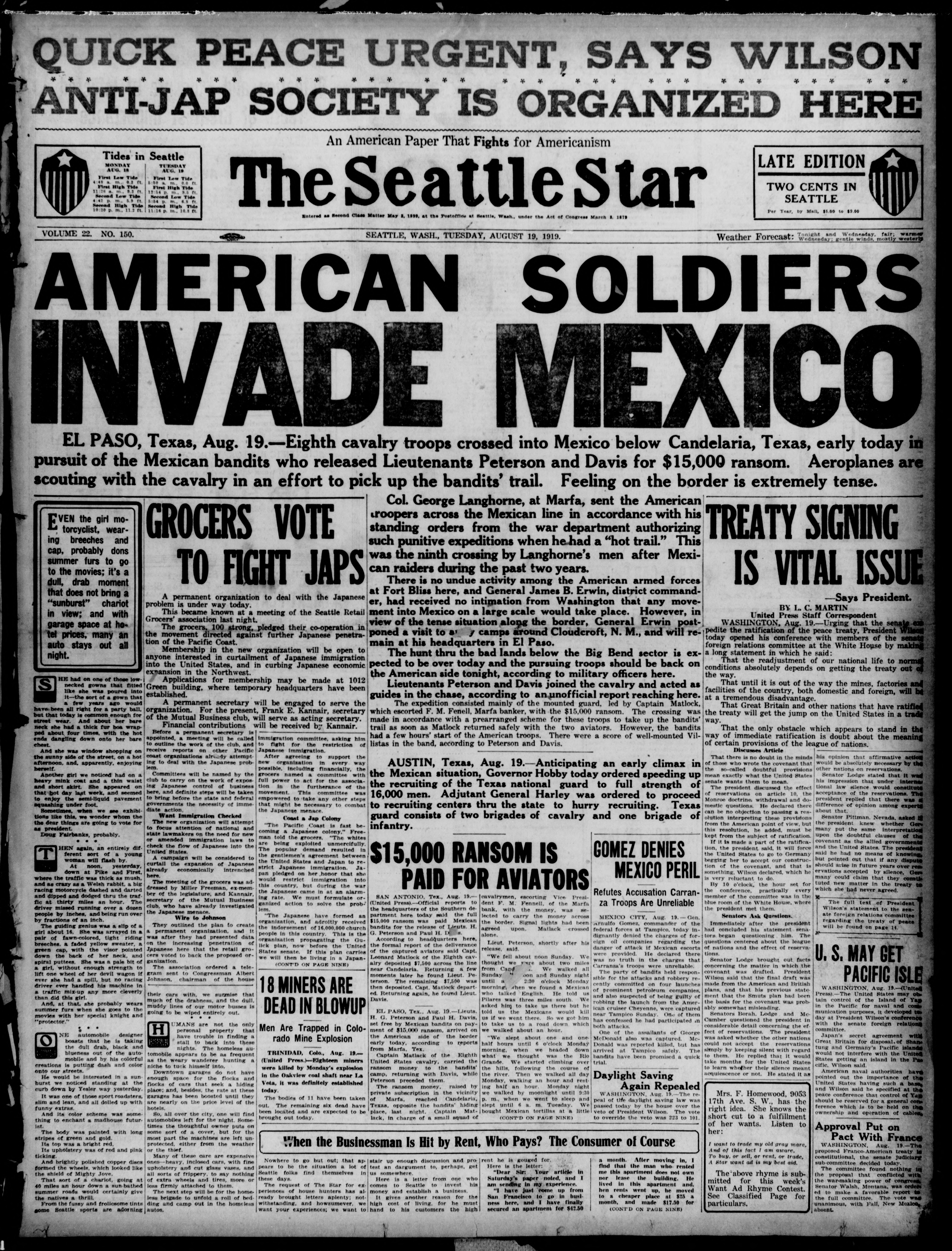
Front Cover of The Seattle Star - August 19, 1919

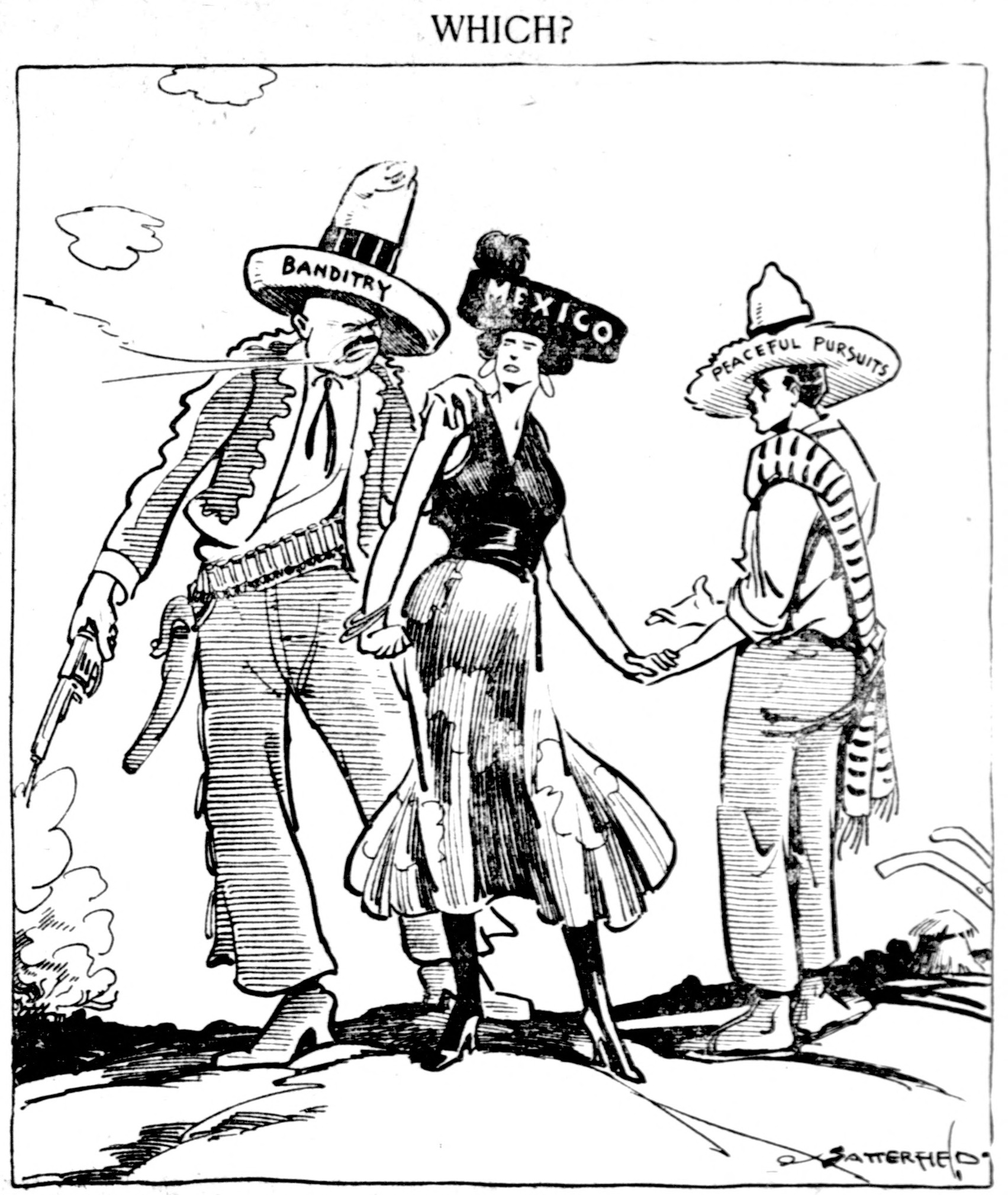
August 21, 1919 Bob Satterfield editorial Cartoon about the incident

United States Army Border Air Patrol pilots, Lt Harold G. Peterson, pilot, and Paul H. Davis, observer-gunner from Marfa Field, Texas, were on a routine patrol in the Big Bend area of Texas on Sunday morning, 10 August 1919. Their mission was to patrol along the Rio Grande from Lajitas to Bosque Bonito and then land at Fort Bliss. Coming to the mouth of the Rio Conchos at Ojinaga, Chihuahua, they mistook the Conchos for the Rio Grande and followed it many miles into Mexico before being forced down by engine trouble. Thinking they were still on the Rio Grande, the airmen picked a spot on the “American” side of the river to land. The terrain was rough and the plane was wrecked. Having buried the machine guns and ammunition to keep them out of the hands of bandits, Peterson and Davis started walking down the river, thinking they would come to the U.S. Cavalry outpost at Candelaria, Texas.

When Peterson and Davis did not arrive at Fort Bliss on Sunday afternoon, the men there assumed they had either returned to Marfa Field or made a forced landing. When they were unaccounted for on Monday, a search was begun. Flying over the patrol route, 1st Lts. Frank Estell and Russell H. Cooper surmised that Peterson and Davis might have mistakenly followed the Conchos into Mexico. The region along the Conchos almost as far as Chihuahua City was added to the area covered by search planes. Tuesday afternoon Peterson and Davis saw a plane flying up the Conchos, but they were in thick brush and could not attract the crew's attention. The search continued until Sunday, 17 August 1919. Then Capt. Leonard F. ('Two- Gun') Matlack, commanding Troop K, 8th Cavalry, at Candelaria, received word Peterson and Davis were being held for ransom.

The flyers had been taken prisoner on Wednesday, 13 August by a Villista named Jesús Rentería. The bandit sent the ransom note to a rancher at Candelaria, along with telegrams which he forced the airmen to write to their fathers and the U.S. Secretary of War, the Commanding General of the Southern Department, and the commanding officer of U.S. forces in the Big Bend District. Rentería demanded $15,000 ($278,600 in 2025) not later than Monday, 18 August, or the two Americans would be killed.

The War Department authorized payment of the ransom, but there remained the matter of getting $15,000 in cash for delivery before the deadline. Ranchers in the area quickly subscribed the full amount, which came from the Marfa National Bank. Negotiation through intermediaries resulted in a plan for Captain Matlack to cross the border Monday night with half of the ransom money for the release of one of the captives. The meeting took place on schedule, and within forty-five minutes Matlack came back with Lieutenant Peterson.

Matlack then took the remaining $7,500 to get Lieutenant Davis. On the way to the rendezvous he overheard two of Rentería's men talking about killing him and Davis as soon as the rest of the ransom money was paid. At the rendezvous, Matlack pulled a gun, told the Mexicans to tell Rentería to “go to hell,” and rode off with Davis and the money. Avoiding the ambush, Matlack and Davis safely crossed into the United States. Questioned by Col. George T. Langhome, Army Commander in the Big Bend District, Peterson and Davis maintained they had been captured on the American side of the border and had not crossed into Mexico.

At daybreak on Tuesday, August 19, 1919, Captain Matlack once again crossed the border, this time leading Troops C and K, 8th Cavalry, in pursuit of Rentería and his men. Air Service planes scouted ahead of the cavalry seeking to spot the bandits. They also gathered information on the condition of the trails and the location of waterholes, and conveyed it to the troops by dropping messages. The troops of the 8th Cavalry came upon a blockhouse and were fired upon from those inside. The 8th Cavalry men stormed the house, killing four and capturing two, while two others were able to escape in the confusion. The Arizona Republican listed three of the four Mexicans killed as Jesus Janir, Francisco Janir and Jose Fuentes.

While flying some twelve or fifteen miles west of Candelaria late Tuesday afternoon, Lieutenants Estell and Cooper saw three horsemen in a canyon and went lower for a better look. When the men on the ground fired on the DH-4, Estell made another pass with his machine guns blazing. Then Cooper opened up with his Lewis Guns and killed one of the men, reportedly Renteria.

The search for members of Rentería's men continued until 23 August. With the Mexican government of Venustiano Carranza protesting the invasion of its territory, U.S. forces returned to the United States.

== Aftermath ==
In 1920, the President of the United States, Woodrow Wilson, authorized Captain Leonard F. Matlack to be granted the position and rank of captain on the retired list.

== See also ==
- United States Army Border Air Patrol

== Bibliography ==
Notes

References

- Arizona Republican (August 22, 1919). "Mexican Bandits Pay Penalty". Arizona Republican. Phoenix, Arizona: Republican Pub. Co. ISSN 2157-135X. OCLC 2612512.
- 66th United States Congress (2019). "An Act For the relief of certain officers of the United States Army, and for other purposes" (PDF). 66th United States Congress.
- Hinkle, Stacy C. (1970). Wings Over the Border: The Army Air Service Armed Patrol of the United States-Mexico Border, 1919-1921. Texas Western Press. - Total pages: 67
- MacCormack, John (April 29, 2018). "The last war of the U.S. Cavalry". San Antonio Express-News.
- Matthews, Matt (2007). The U.S. Army on the Mexican Border: A Historical Perspective (PDF). Combat Studies Institute Press. ISBN 9780160789038. Archived from the original (PDF) on 13 October 2011. - Total pages: 101
- Maurer, Maurer (1987). Aviation in the U.S. Army, 1919-1939. Office of Air Force History, U.S. Air Force. ISBN 9780912799384. - Total pages: 626
- The Seattle Star (August 19, 1919). "Front Cover". The Seattle Star. Seattle, Washington: E.H. Wells & Co. pp. 1–14. ISSN 2159-5577. OCLC 17285351.
- The Washington Herald (2019). "Follow Hot Trail as Ransom Frees 2 Air Pilots". The Washington Herald. Washington, D.C. pp. 1–12. ISSN 1941-0662. OCLC 9470809.
