= 9th Bomb Squadron =

US Air Force unit

9th Bomb Squadron

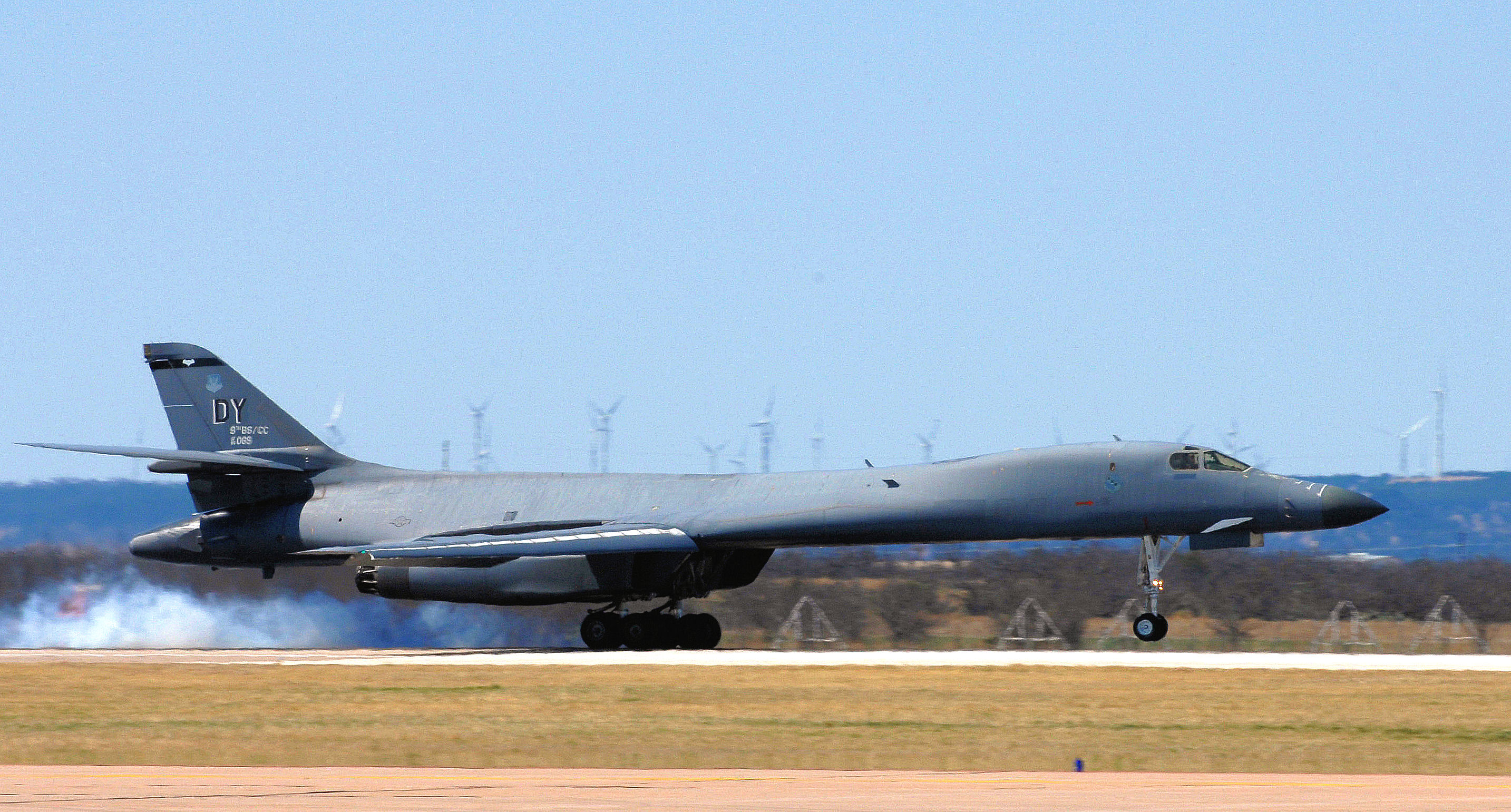
- 9th Bomb Squadron Rockwell B-1B Lancer (Note: Aircraft is North American Rockwell B-1B Lancer Lot IV, serial 85-69.)
- Active: 1917–1922; 1931–1946; 1946–1968; 1969–1992; 1993–present
- Country: United States
- Branch: United States Air Force
- Type: Squadron
- Role: Strategic Bombing; Close Air Support; Air Interdiction
- Part of: Global Strike Command
- Garrison/HQ: Dyess Air Force Base
- Nickname: Bats
- Tail Flash: "DY", Black tail stripe with white bat silhouette
- Engagements: World War I; World War II – Antisubmarine; World War II – Asia-Pacific Theater

- Decorations: Distinguished Unit Citation (2×); Air Force Outstanding Unit Award (7×); Philippine Presidential Unit Citation

Insignia
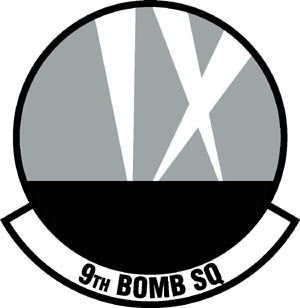
- 9th Bomb Squadron emblem (approved 26 July 1932) (Note: The 9th Bomb Squadron's emblem features 3 spotlights aiming skyward, to represent the 3 major campaigns the 9th participated in during WWI. One spotlight shines vertically, while the other two cross each other. This forms an IX, which is the Roman Numeral for 9.)

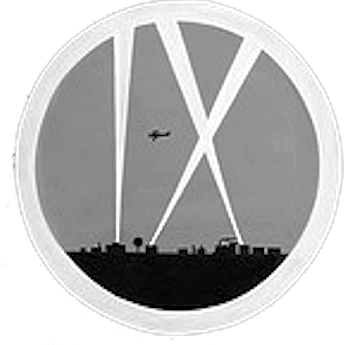
- 9th Aero Squadron emblem (approved by AEF 18 November 1918)

Aircraft flown
- Bomber: Rockwell B-1B Lancer

The 9th Bomb Squadron is a squadron of the United States Air Force. It is assigned to the 7th Operations Group, Global Strike Command, stationed at Dyess Air Force Base, Texas. The squadron is equipped with the Rockwell B-1B Lancer bomber.

Formed in June 1917, the 9th is one of the oldest squadrons in the Air Force. During World War I, the squadron was the first American night reconnaissance squadron to be organized. Later, it served with the Army Air Service and Army Air Corps in the Inter-War period and then served in Australia, Egypt and India during World War II. A part of Strategic Air Command during the Cold War, today the squadron is engaged as part of the global war on terrorism.

== Mission ==
The 9th Bomb Squadron maintains combat readiness to achieve its mission of delivering rapid, decisive airpower on a large scale in support of conventional warfare taskings. The squadron provides warfighting commanders with efficient maintenance support, operational aircrews and Rockwell B-1B Lancer aircraft.

The squadron repairs, services, launches, recovers and inspects 15 B-1B Lancer aircraft capable of sustained intercontinental missions and worldwide deployment/employment from forward operating locations.

== History ==
=== World War I ===
The 9th Bombardment Squadron began as the 9th Aero Squadron at Camp Kelly, Texas, on 14 June 1917. The United States had entered World War I in April of that year and the unit was targeted for overseas combat duty. Their first European stop was Winchester, England in December 1917. Following the holidays the unit moved on to RFC Grantham, England to train for combat flying the Sopwith Scout. After eight months of intensive training, the unit moved to the Western Front in August 1918.

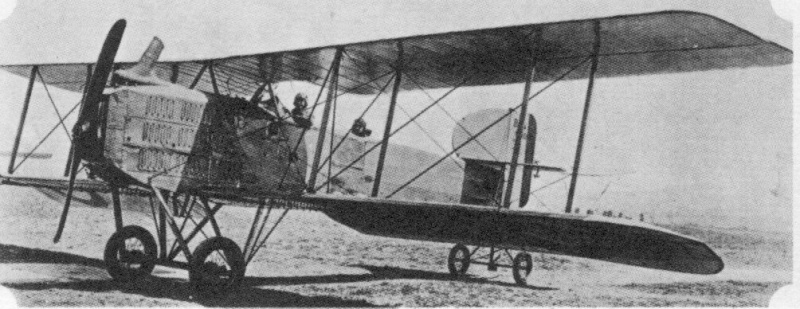
French Breguet 14 B.2 bomber, the type used by the 9th Aero Squadron.

While in Colombey-les-Belles Airdrome, France, the 9th was assigned to the First Army Observation Group. Also, after arrival in France, the unit began flying a new aircraft; the French Breguet 14. That aircraft would be used extensively to perform the units mission, night reconnaissance. By specializing in night reconnaissance, the 9th gained the unique distinction of being the first in the Army Air Service to do so. However, their missions were not without danger. In one case, two of the 9th's aircraft were engaged by seven enemy Fokkers. The 9th's aircraft not only shot down two German aircraft, but completed their photographic mission.

As the war progressed the unit participated in many night missions and battles. Most famous of those battles were the Battle of Lorraine, Battle of St Michiel, and the Meuse-Argonne Offensive. For those, the unit earned their first battle streamers. After the war had drawn to a close, the unit was moved to Trier, Germany to serve as part of the occupation force under the Third Army on 5 December 1918. In June 1919, the unit was ordered back to the States where they were stationed at Mitchel Field, New York; Park Field, Tennessee; and at March Field, California.

=== Inter-War period ===
see also: United States Army Border Air Patrol

While at March, the 9th was equipped with some surplus Dayton-Wright DH-4s and assigned to the Western Department in July 1919 flying border and fire patrols. With the establishment of a permanent Army Air Service, on 14 March 1921, the 9th was redesignated as the 9th Squadron (Observation). Funding shortages, however led to the squadron's inactivation on 29 June 1922.

While inactive, the 9th was redesignated twice. First, as the 9th Observation Squadron on 25 January 1923 and secondly, as the 9th Bombardment Squadron on 24 March 1923. On 1 April 1931, the 9th was activated and assigned to the 7th Bombardment Group at Hamilton Field, California, and equipped with Keystone B-4 light bombers. While with the 7th Broup, the 9th flew numerous training flights in a variety of airplanes. In 1935 the unit participated in a mass bomber formation, cross-country flight from March Field, California, to MacDill Field, Florida.

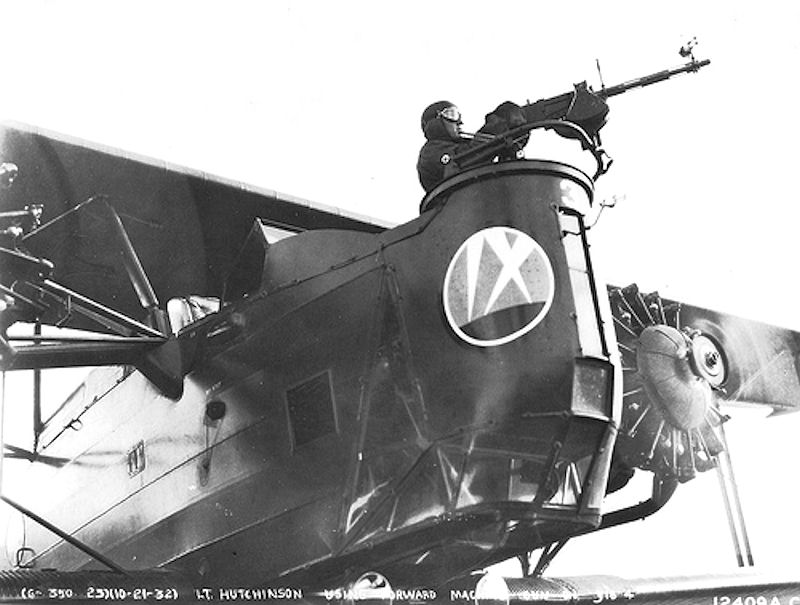
Keystone B-3 of the 9th Bombardment Squadron, March Field, California.

In the summer of 1939, the 9th received its first Boeing B-17B Flying Fortress. However the runway at Hamilton Field was not adequate for the B-17, and the larger planes forced the 7th Bombardment Group to move elsewhere. In 1939 the Group was designated as a heavy group and moved to Fort Douglas, Utah on 7 September 1940, to train with B-17s. In January 1941, the 9th moved along with the 7th Bombardment Group to Salt Lake City Airport, Utah. In February, the squadron was upgraded to the new B-17D Fortress, which had improved engines and a better armament.

With tensions increasing in the Philippine Islands and the threat of war with the Japanese Empire growing daily, the Army wanted to send these aircraft to the Philippine Department where they would join the newly created US Army Forces in the Far East. The thinking in Washington was that if Japan attacked the Philippines, the forces there would hold out as long as they could on their own until they could be reinforced from the United States.

In October of that year the unit prepared to take part in an exercise with the group in the Pacific area. With the ground echelon setting sail on 13 November 1941, the 9th made ready to fly into Hickam Field, Hawaii, the following month on 7 December 1941. The B-17s had no ammunition so more fuel could be carried on the long flight to Hawaii, and to compensate for the additional fuel stored aft of the center of gravity, the armor had been removed from the crew positions and placed, along with the machine guns, forward in the fuselage to balance the weight of the aircraft. Upon reaching Hawaii, the squadron arrived in the midst of the Japanese attack on Pearl Harbor. Unarmed and unable to fight back, the 9th lost several aircraft to enemy and friendly fire. Others scattered and landed hastily wherever they could.

=== World War II ===
After the Pearl Harbor Attack in December 1941, the squadron aircraft that had not yet been deployed to Hawaii were sent to Muroc Army Air Field to help defend Southern California from a possible Japanese attack since in the hysteria of the moment the Japanese fleet was expected to show up off Santa Barbara, California at any time. From Muroc, the planes flew on antisubmarine patrols off the California coast until about 12 December 1941.

==== Battle of Java ====
In early January the squadron moved out, first to Hickam Field, then along a long route to the Southwest Pacific via Christmas Island Airfield, Canton Island Airfield, Tontouta Airfield on Fiji, Plaine Des Gaiacs Airfield on New Caledonia then to RAAF Base Townsville in Queensland, Australia. Upon arrival in Australia, the B-17Ds that they had ferried to Townsville were sent to other units in Australia. Instead, the 7th Group would receive new equipment and Consolidated LB-30 Liberators were supplied to the group. From Australia, it was decided to send the 7th Group to airfields on Java in the Netherlands East Indies to conduct raids on advancing Japanese ground forces and naval targets. The first of the personnel of the 9th Squadron reached Java on 10 January when three LB-30 Liberators landed at Bandoeng Airport, then moved on the next day to Malang, where V Bomber Command had established a headquarters.

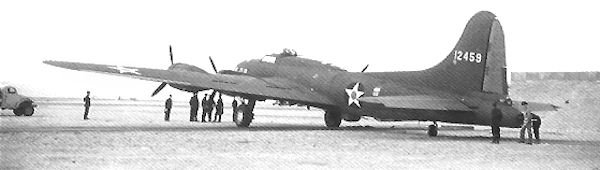
B-17E Flying Fortress on its way to join the 9th Bombardment Squadron (Note: Aircraft is Boeing B-17E Flying Fortress, serial 41-2459, photographed at RAF Shallufa, Egypt in December 1941 en route via Florida, Caribbean, Brazil, across the South Atlantic and Central Africa.)

Newer B-17E Flying Fortresses, equipped with a tail gunner were sent to the area from the United States. This involved the group performing a cross-country trip from Hamilton Field to MacDill Field, Florida. From Florida, aircraft were flown south to Trinidad, then Belém, then to Natal on the easternmost tip of Brazil. Then a flight across the South Atlantic from the tip of Brazil across to Africa and landing at the British airdrome at Freetown, Sierra Leone. Then they headed inland and north to Kano, Nigeria, and across Africa to Khartoum, Sudan. At Khartoum, all the crews were given cholera inoculations, then the planes flew either up to Cairo before turning eastward, or else they were sent straight east across Arabia to Aden and then northeast to Karachi. Either at Cairo or Karachi the crews first learned that Java was their destination. It was the first indication they had had that the United States had been driven out of the Philippines. The last stop was at Colombo, Ceylon. From there the B-17s went straight through to Java and landed at Bandoeng Airport, where they received orders to go on to Malang Airport.

On Java, the planes arrived in flights of one, two or occasionally three planes. From Malang, the planes moved to Singosari Airfield near Surabaya, in northeast Java where the 9th operated from with the 22d Bombardment Squadron. Their very first mission had given them a violent introduction to the kind of fighting they might expect from the Japanese. On 16 January two B-17Es and three LB-30S took off together from Singosari to attack Japanese air and naval concentrations in the Bay of Manado located at Menado in the Northern Celebes Islands, about 1,000 miles to the northeast.

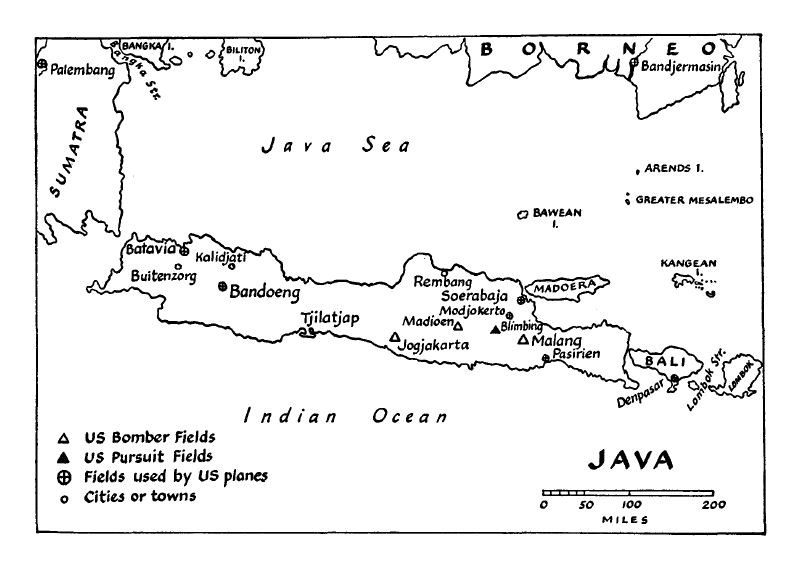
USAAF Fifth Air Force bases on Java, Netherlands East Indies, 1942

The attack force staged through an airfield on Kendari, spending the night of 16 January there, refueling and taking off in the early hours next morning. Two targets had been assigned: the B-17s were to attack shipping in Menado Bay, while the LB-30S bombed an airport in the vicinity. However, their orders were so unclear that the LB-30 crews could not be sure where the airport was and they had to spend fifteen or twenty minutes searching before they finally found the field at Langoan, beside a lake, about 20 miles south of Menado. Almost in the instant that the last plane reported its bombs away, they were hit by five Zeros, and for six minutes the three LB-30s were under fire. They managed to shoot down one of the Zeros before themselves escaping into the weather; but two of the aircraft had been fatally hurt.

In the meantime the two B-17Es had arrived over Menado to find four transports out in the bay and two more at the docks. On their first run, because of inexperience, they got themselves so blinded by the sun that they could drop no bombs, and on the second one plane had six bombs hang in the racks; yet as they withdrew the crews saw one of the transports capsize in the bay. Their returning course took them over the airport where the plane with the hung bombs managed to kick out two more on the runways, but the last four remained in the racks. Five minutes after this they were attacked by 15 enemy fighters. Two Messerschmitts, the rest Zeros made their passes from the rear or by diving under the bombers and pulling up behind to deliver their fire. The B-17E Fortress tail gunners, not seen before by the enemy let them come up close. Then, for some minutes before the Japanese discovered what had been added, it beat any skeet shoot ever seen. Five Zeros and one Messerschmidt went down. There were wounded in both Fortresses, and they were forced to land at Kendari for medical aid, gas, and repairs. An hour later, while they were still at work on one of the B-17's engines, five Zeros swept in to strafe the field. One of the B-17's took off in the face of the attacking planes and successfully fought off the three that went after it. The other two Zeros shot up the airport and further damaged the B-17 on the ground. The crew spent two more days endeavoring to repair his engines. Then, with Japanese ground troops approaching the field, they blew up the B-17 and the crew was taken back to Malang by one of the 11th Squadron's LB-30s

While the B-17s were being attacked at Kendari, the flight of three LB-30S continued on course towards Malang. Two of the LB-30s had to drop out, one landing at Makassar, where it had to be burned when it could not be repaired. The other LB-30 was forced to crash-land on a streak of sandy beach on Greater Mesalembo Island. For nine days the crew waited there, with little but coconuts to live on and no proper shelter or medical care for their wounded, hoping that the wrecked plane would be spotted by a friendly aircraft. On the tenth day, they were picked up by a Navy Consolidated PBY Catalina.

Additional attacks against the Japanese were made but such attacks were on too small a scale to do more than delay the Japanese, to whom one or two transports were but minor losses. The effort to fulfill this program was out of all proportion to the final result; and, as the Japanese continued their moves south through the Dutch East Indies towards Java.

On 3 February, the Japanese counter-attacked by attacking Singosari Airfield where a dive-bombing and strafing attack caught the Fortresses on the field. There had been no warning and there was no defense except for that provided by some old World War I French 75s of the 131st Field Artillery. Five planes were destroyed on the ground. That was not yet the end of the day's black news. The 7th Group, running its first mission out of Jogjakarta Airfield that morning, had sent nine B-17s up to Balikpapan. Eight came back. That made a total of six B-17s lost for the day.

From then on new replacement B-17s coming in from the States via India and Africa were barely able to keep pace with the losses. The airdromes were never safe from enemy attack and being without adequate antiaircraft defenses, planes that could not get off on a combat mission early enough to evade the expected raids were sent away from the airfields at the first alarm to spend the day cruising aimlessly up and down off the south coast of Java 100 miles west of Malang, putting hour after hour on the engines and increasing the frustration of the crews. On the morning of 8 February nine B-17s of the 7th Group took off on a mission against the airdrome at Kendari from which the Japanese were now launching most of their raids on Java. Almost immediately after taking off the formation was attacked by the Japanese. Three were shot down and the other six jettisoned their bombs and attempted to hide in the clouds. Only one of the nine planes dispatched that morning from Malang one that had returned early with engine trouble, came back undamaged. Nineteen men had been killed.

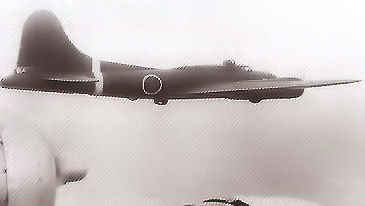
Captured Boeing B-17E Fortress 41-2471 formerly of 7th Bomb Group after being repaired by Japanese (Note: The aircraft crash landed on 8 February 1942 at Djojakarta, Java and was abandoned. It was captured and repaired by the Japanese and used for training to develop fighter tactics against US AAF B-17s. The eventual fate of this aircraft is unknown.)

On 15 February when the British surrendered at Singapore, the Japanese pincers closed on Java. A fleet of 41 transports originating at Jolo in the Philippines were heading straight down the Makassar Strait and, after a single stop at Balikpapan, moved out across the Java Sea. A second fleet, even larger, was coming down out of the China Sea around the western curve of Borneo against Batavia and Western Java. The men on the bomber fields in Java received the news of Singapore's surrender as forewarning of their own defeat. Attacks were flown against the fleets heading towards Java, but the Joint Army-Navy Assessment Commission credited the Army airplanes of all Allied Air forces in the theater with no more than three minesweepers, four passenger or cargo vessels, and one converted salvage vessel sunk, and a part in the sinking of two other cargo vessels.

With the Japanese ground forces heading south, plans were made to evacuate the bombers back to Australia. Between the 20th and 23d Malang alone suffered twelve separate attacks, and in the four days following the disastrous 20th eight more planes were lost on the ground. On 24 February 24 six B-17s attacked a Japanese convoy forming in the Makassar Strait for the final thrust across the Java Sea and again in the closing hours during the night of 28 February – 1 March, when six B-17s and one LB-30 bombed the same convoy as it moved towards the Java beaches. Their work was notable more as a gesture than for any worthwhile results and did nothing to halt or even delay the Japanese. To Fifth Bomber Command it became obvious that to continue operations on the present basis, without fighter protection and with their only three practicable airdromes under constant enemy observation, would mean the certain loss of all their planes. It was time to pull out and the remaining forces were withdrawn to Darwin, in the Northern Territory of Australia.

==== India B-17 operations ====
The squadron re-equipped in Australia during February the unit prepared to move to a new secret station. Arriving in Karachi, India, on 12 March 1942, they established headquarters at the dirigible hangar seven miles east of Karachi and became one of the initial units of what became Tenth Air Force. Almost at once the 7th Group, already veterans of battle with the Japanese in Java, proceeded to hit the enemy which was at that time attempting to move into Burma. They also aided greatly in the delivery of troops to Burma and on their return trip bringing out evacuees.

While this was being carried out, other members of the command were hastily constructing a permanent air base for the group. Many of the buildings were constructed out of packing crates and other various discarded materials. The men at that time were stationed in tents located near the newly constructed headquarters. Major Cecil E. Combs, originally with the 19th Bombardment Group, was assigned to the group at this time and assumed command. During the latter part of March and early April, new crews with B-17 airplanes arrived from the U.S. and although forward units of the group stationed at Agra and Calcutta were already hitting the enemy, the training of these crews was undertaken to prepare them for the future air war against the Japanese in the China-Burma-India theater. Missions during this time consisted of bomber raids on Akyab, Rangoon and various other points in Burma. Losses were slight, though a number of crews failed to return, being destroyed in the air by Japanese Zeros.

==== Middle East operations ====
In June 1942, the German Afrika Korps advance in North Africa forced the British Eighth Army to retreat towards Egypt putting British Middle East Command at risk. The United States Army Air Forces had already planned for a buildup of American air power in the Middle East in January 1942 in response to a request from the British Chief of the Air Staff.

In anticipation of the arrival of the American air groups, the War Department sent Maj. Gen. Lewis H. Brereton, commander of Tenth Air Force, to Cairo for temporary duty to assist the British. His orders instructed him to take as many planes as he could from India to Egypt. On 29 June 1942, combat crews and ground men from the 9th Squadron departed from India for the Middle East for duty in that theater, to repulse the Nazis then attempting an offensive against the new invasion forces of the U.S. When these forces arrived from India, United States Army Middle East Air Force (USAMEAF) was established and Brereton was named its commander.

USAMEAF bomber forces consisted of nine B-17Es and nineteen B-24 Liberators formerly of the 9th and the 88th Reconnaissance Squadron of the 7th Group. They would be organized into the 1st Provisional Bombardment Group on 20 July. It was the core of what would eventually become the 376th Bombardment Group of Ninth Air Force, which was transferred to RAF Abu Sueir, Egypt on 12 November.

B-17s would be flown on combat missions from RAF Lydda and RAF El Fayid, Egypt, attacking the harbor at Tobruk, Libya seven times with day and night raids throughout July, continually raiding the harbor shipping and disrupting Axis storage areas. It is believed that the Fortresses were sent to the secret Gura Army Air Base, Eritrea (Project 19) in August for depot-level maintenance, which was not possible at the British bases and had which been deferred since the beginning of the war in December.

The B-17Es would not engage in combat again until raids on Tobruk began again on 12 October, and attacking a coastal road near Bardia, Libya on 20 October after a mission against Tobruk was cancelled due to cloud cover. They were also engaged in attacking harbor facilities and Axis naval targets on Crete and Benghazi, Libya through which Afrika Korps supplies were landed. The B-17s made a final raid against installations at Sousse, Tunisia before being taken out of front-line service with the arrival of newer B-24 and B-25 units from the United States.

==== Tenth Air Force operations ====
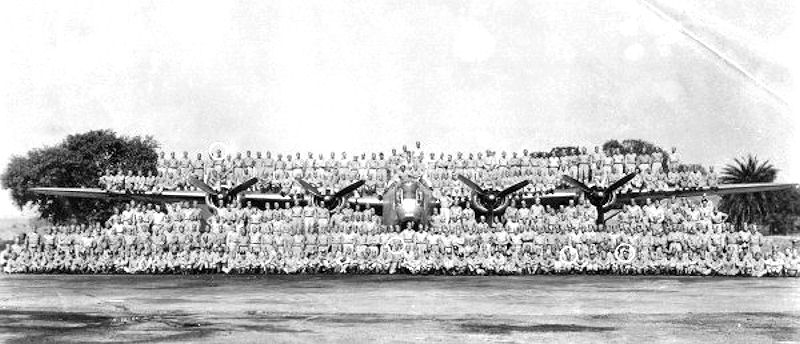
Official group photo of 9th Bomb Squadron, Pandaveswar Army Air Base, India, 6 March 1945

Reequipped with Consolidated B-24D Liberators the 9th was reassigned back to Tenth Air Force in India, where for the balance of the war, it carried out long distance heavy bomb raids over Japanese targets primarily in Burma, Thailand and French Indochina; although it also attacked Japanese targets in southeastern China attacking airfields, fuel and supply dumps, locomotive works, railways, bridges, docks, warehouses, shipping, and troop concentrations in Burma and struck oil refineries in Thailand, power plants in China and enemy shipping in the Andaman Sea. Ceased bombing operations in late May 1945 and was attached to Air Transport Command to haul gasoline from India over the Hump to China. The squadron demobilized in India, leaving B-24s to Indian Colonial forces, inactivated as an administrative unit in the United States in early 1946.

=== Strategic Air Command ===
==== B-29 Superfortress era ====
Nine months after the 9th was inactivated following World War II, it was reactivated and assigned to the 7th Bombardment Group at Fort Worth Army Air Field, Texas, on 1 October 1946.

Training began in the Boeing B-29 Superfortress in November 1946 under the standards established by Strategic Air Command (SAC). Throughout 1947, the unit prepared its people for any combat eventuality that might arise training with assigned B-29s in global bombardment operations. Within the United States SAC units flew many simulated attacks on major metropolitan areas.

On 12 September 1947, the 9th along with the group deployed to Giebelstadt Air Base, Germany. This flight was the largest bomber formation flown overseas from Fort Worth to date. En route the aircraft flew to Maine over Greenland, Iceland, Great Britain, landing in Germany on 13 September. During the unit's ten-day deployment, they participated in training operations over Europe and redeployed to Fort Worth on 23 September 1947. On 2 November 1947, the 9th participated in a 30-day Far East deployment and training exercise. However, the exercise was pushed back to 6 November and on that date the 9th deployed four B-29s to NAS Barbers Point, Hawaii, en route to Yokota Air Base, Japan. At Hawaii it was discovered that the fuel used in the Pacific was not compatible for the B-29s. Based on that, the aircraft returned to Fort Worth on 8 November 1947. In February 1948, the 9th deployed to Germany for temporary duty in three flights, flying three different routes to Europe. The first flight of three B-29s departed Carswell on 25 February by way of Westover Air Force Base, Massachusetts; Keflavik Air Base, Iceland; and finally landing at Fürstenfeldbruck Air Base, Germany.

The next flight departed on 26 February with four B-29 aircraft by way of MacDill Air Force Base, Florida; Lajes Field, Azores to Fürstenfeldbruck. The last flight, consisting of the remaining three aircraft in the squadron left Carswell on 27 February and flew to Lajes, then on to Fürstenfeldbruck. By 27 February, all 9th Squadron aircraft were in place for the 90-day deployment. On 25 April the unit returned to Fort Worth after a successful deployment in which the unit gained valuable training experience in Europe.

==== B-36 Peacemaker era ====
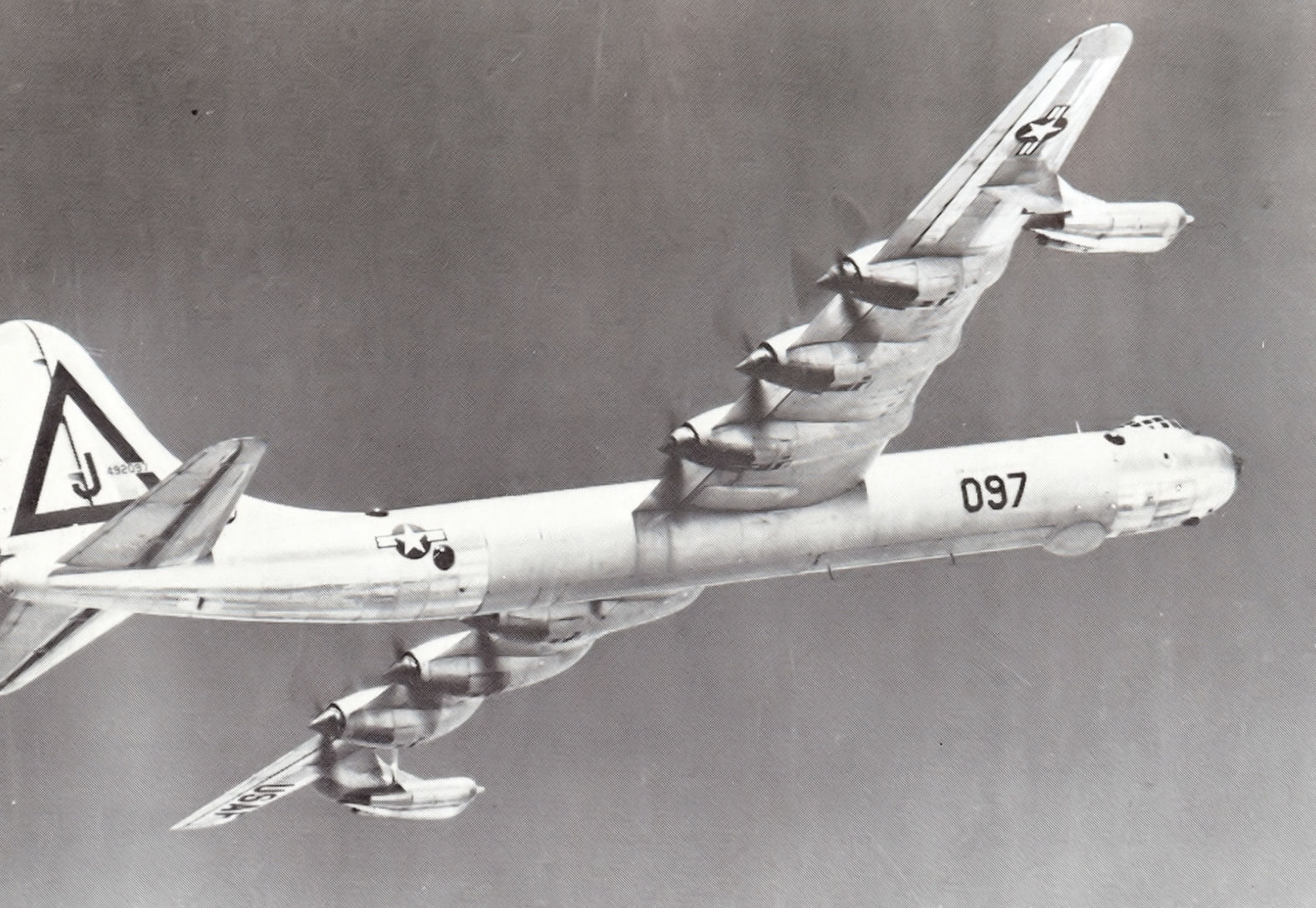
9th Bombardment Squadron B-36 Peacemaker (Note: Aircraft is Convair B-36D Peacemaker, serial 44-92097.)

On 1 July 1948, the 9th received its first Convair B-36A Peacemaker, the initial production version of the bomber, followed by a second B-36 on 12 July. Flying the massive new bomber, the squadron prepared for a maximum effort flight in July over New York City to celebrate the opening of the Idlewild Airport. The 7th Bombardment Wing was designated as the lead unit in the formation led by Major General Roger M. Ramey, Eighth Air Force commander. The 9th flew three B-29s in the formation.

During August 1948, the 9th received two more B-36As for a total of nine wing assigned B-36s. On 17 December, four B-36s from the 9th took part in a SAC maximum effort mission. A total of ten wing bombers flew missions to key cities in the United States. Those flights gave the American public their first look at the world's largest bomber. By October 1948, the wing possessed a total of 18 of the B-36A aircraft. Of those, the 9th Bombardment Squadron had five. On 19 November, the 9th transferred their final B-29 to the 97th Bombardment Group at Biggs Air Force Base, Texas. That transfer left the 9th an all B-36 squadron.

In January 1949, the United States had a new President, Harry S. Truman, and the 9th participated in the B-36 formation to commemorate the inauguration at Washington D.C. On 15 February the 9th, along with the wing, flew a sixteen ship formation commemorating air'progress in an aerial review over Andrews Air Force Base, Maryland. That formation was the largest B-36 formation to date of the world's largest bomber.

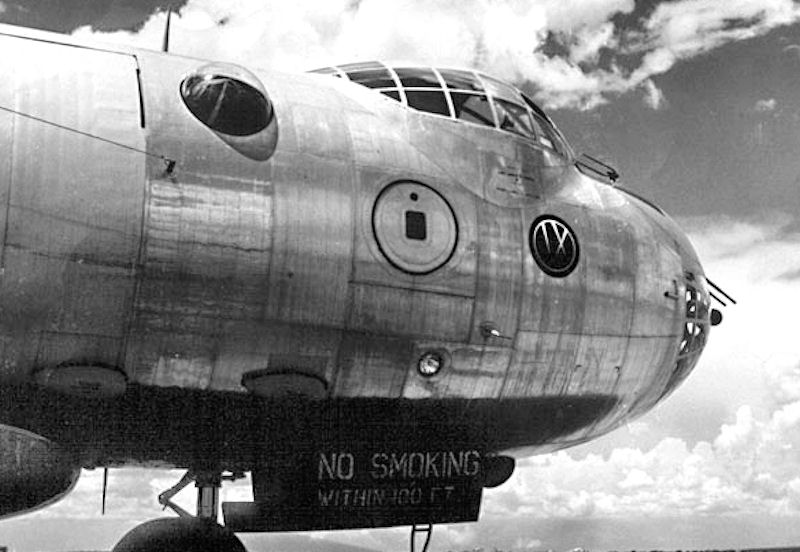
Nose of a 9th Bombardment Squadron B-36 at Carswell AFB, Texas

In August 1950, the unit began participating in simulated bombing missions to Limestone Air Force Base, Maine at the rate of one per day. Maximum training requirements would be met on the missions along with fighter exercises. The missions would consist of simulated radar bombing of St Louis, Missouri. The exercise was very successful and the aircraft recovered at Carswell on 24 August 1950. In early 1950, Convair began conversion of the B-36As to the RB-36A reconnaissance configuration, and in August, the squadron began receiving the twin-turbojet fitted B-36D.

In December 1950 the unit took part in flight to Ramey Air Force Base, Puerto Rico. This was the first time wing B-36s had landed in Puerto Rico. Next, the 9th along with the wing participated in a special training mission to the United Kingdom, landing at RAF Lakenheath. The purpose of the mission was to evaluate the B-36D under simulated war plan conditions. This marked the first time that B-36s had flown outside US territory. The flight carried out a simulated night radar bombing attack on Helgoland, on the German coast. The aircraft returned to Carswell on 20 January

In June 1951 three bomber crews were assigned to the Convair-operated Air Force Plant 4 at Fort Worth temporarily to participate in the B-36F operational training program. As 1952 closed the 9th was transitioning into the B-36F model. The 9th opened 1953 by deploying to RAF Fairford, United Kingdom as part of a unit simulated combat mission. Six B-36F aircraft took part. All year the squadron was involved in stepped-up training missions throughout the world, when the squadron was deployed on a simulated combat mission to Nouasseur AB, French Morocco, North Africa, 7–14 October. This was the first time the wing and 9th deployed to North Africa. At the end of 1953, the squadron began receiving upgraded B-36H aircraft

Throughout the early part of 1958 squadron B-36 crews rotated to Castle Air Force Base, California for Boeing B-52 Stratofortress training. Also, the first B-36s were retired to storage at Davis-Monthan Air Force Base, Arizona starting in January. On 30 May the last wing B-36 was retired.

==== B-52 Stratofortress era ====
Special research missions were flown by the 9th in the B-52F from October 1959 to June 1960 with the AGM-28 Hound Dog air-launched cruise missile, although the squadron never employed them on nuclear alert duty. Afterwards, the squadron supported SAC's worldwide airborne alert Force from 1960 to 1965.

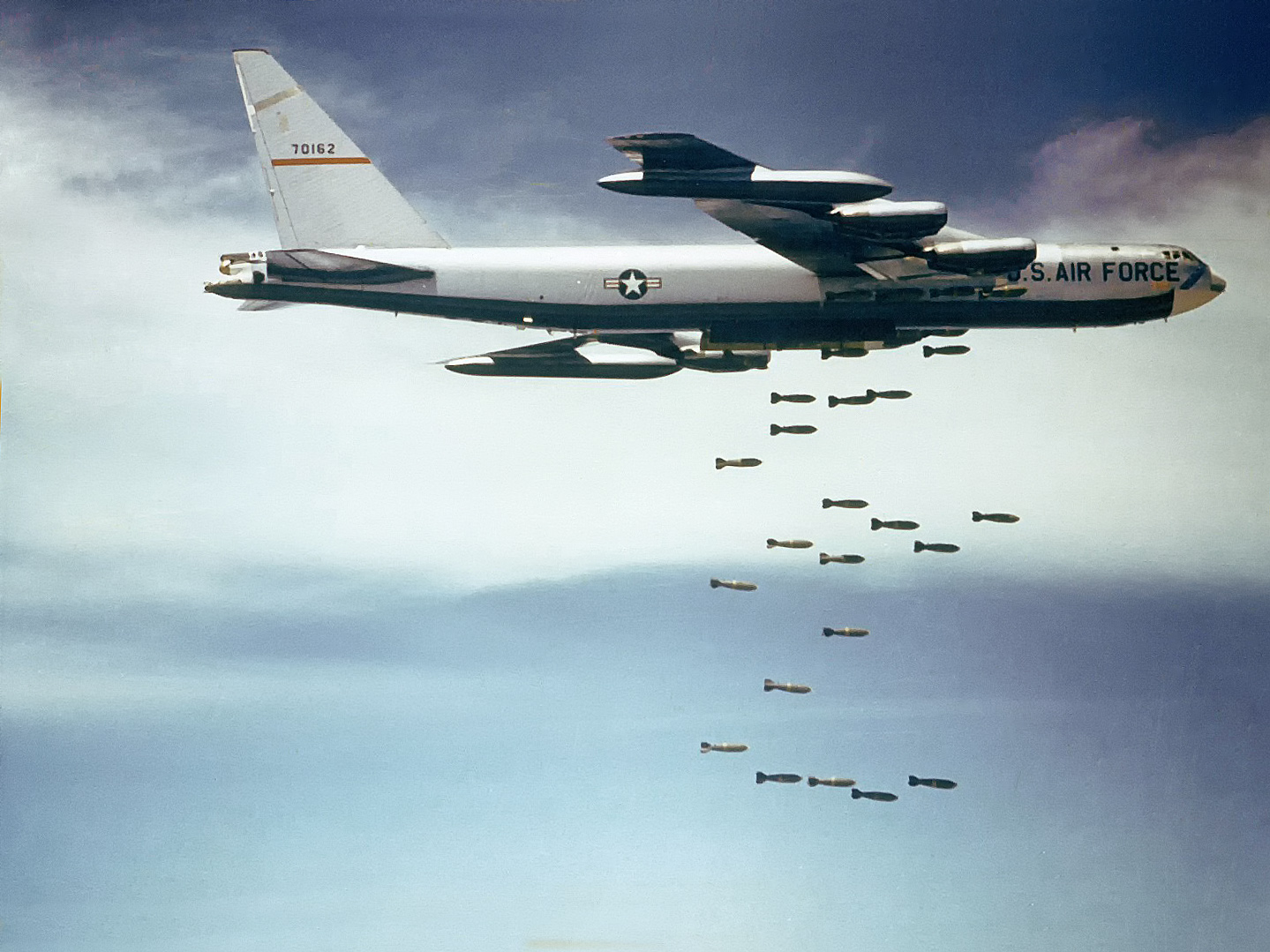
Boeing B-52F Stratofortress dropping M117 750 lb (340 kg) bombs over Vietnam, 1965

In June 1964, the Air Staff approved the modification of 28 B-52Fs under a project known as South Bay. They could carry 24 750-pound bombs externally. The bombs were carried on external pylons installed underneath each wing inboard of the inner engine pods. These pylons had originally been designed to carry the Hound Dog cruise missile.

From May to November 1965, the unit deployed to Andersen Air Force Base, Guam in support of Operation Arc Light missions. The squadron first attacked suspected Viet Cong enclaves at Ben Cat, 40 miles north of Saigon, South Vietnam, on 18 June, the operation being supported by Boeing KC-135A Stratotankers stationed at Kadena Air Base, Okinawa.

Prior to the mission, the crews were briefed that a minimum of 2000-3000 (possibly as high as 6000 or more) North Vietnamese Army troops were encamped in the target area. To ensure security, it was planned that the raid would be carried out in complete radio silence from beginning to end. The raid did not start off well, as on the way to the target, two B-52Fs collided in midair during a refueling operation and 8 crew members were killed. An investigation later blamed the cause for the mid-air collision on a combination of poor staff planning, extremely unusual and unique weather conditions, forbidden radio communications and an untested air refueling operation. The next day, the press back in the United States generally derided the raid as being an expensive and costly failure, and it was claimed that only one water buffalo was killed and only 100 pounds of rice were destroyed.

However, it seems that the results of the raid were a lot more effective than the press had led people to believe. All of the bombs were dropped into the correct target box, except for one string of bombs which had missed the area completely because of a radar failure. After about a week, US Army teams began to enter the area and reported almost total destruction of all life in the area. Additional missions were cancelled and did not resume until July. There was initially some skepticism about the usefulness of a high-altitude radar bomb drop against guerrilla forces. Nevertheless, within a few months there was universal acceptance of the power of the B-52 raids as a new type of artillery. By November 1965, the B-52s were able to support the 1st Air Cavalry Division in mopping up operations near Pleiku.

The unit returned to Carswell in December 1965 to joyful families in time for the holidays. In a reduction of B-52 units for budgetary reasons, the 9th was inactivated on 25 June 1968. Several of the B-52s were retired, others were sent to the 93d Bombardment Wing at Castle Air Force Base.

===== FB-111 era =====
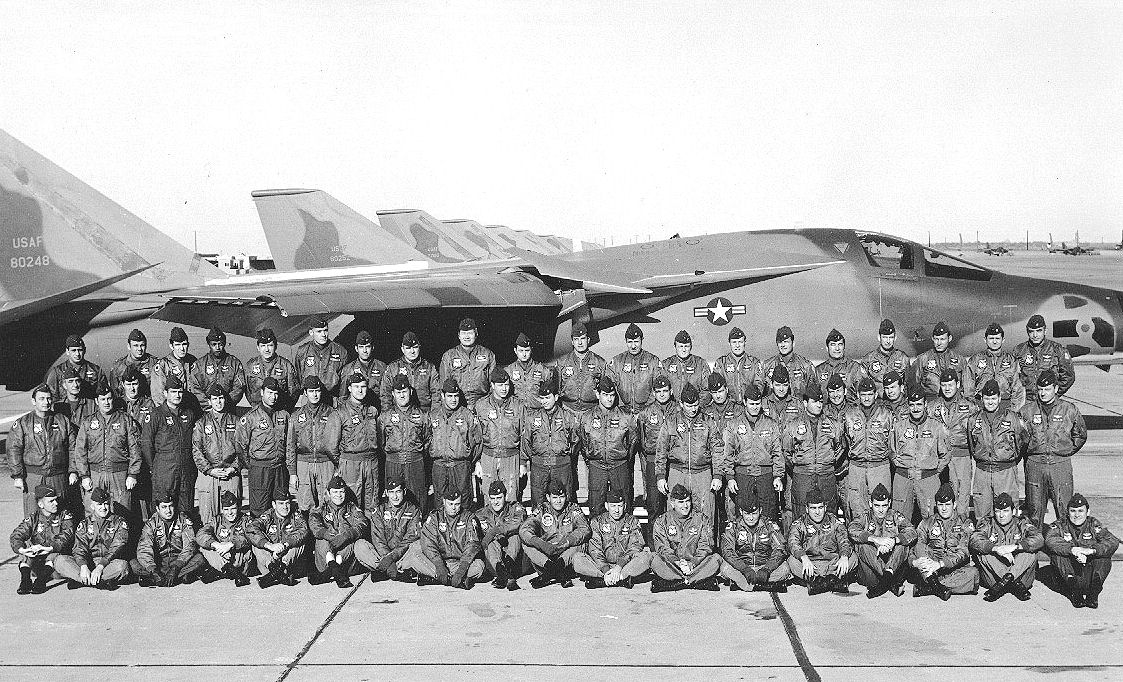
9th Bombardment Squadron FB-111A (Note: Aircraft is General Dynamics FB-111A Aardvark, serial 68-248, taken in 1970.)

On 2 July 1968, the 340th Bombardment Group was activated at Carswell. Although it was given the designation of a bomb group, the 340th was organized and functioned as a SAC Wing. Its operational squadron was the 4007th Combat Crew Training Squadron. The 340th was given the primary mission of conducting initial qualification training for General Dynamics FB-111A aircrew members. The FB-111A was the all-weather strategic bombing version of the F-111 strike aircraft, intended as an interim successor to SAC's B-52 Stratofortress and Convair B-58 Hustler.

Due to the delayed delivery of FB-111A from General Dynamics, the group's training mission suffered. Delivery of the first aircraft, took place in late September 1969, followed by the second FB-111A on 25 October. These two planes were powered by TF30-P-12A engines. Problems with the Mark IIB avionics slowed further deliveries, with the Air Force not accepting its next FB-111A until 23 June 1969.

On 8 October 1969, the 7th FB-111A entered service with the 4007th Squadron. Even though the FB-111A was officially declared operational, it had yet to reach the combat forces. After reaching operational capability, the 4007th relocated to Plattsburgh Air Force Base, New York and became part of the 380th Strategic Aerospace Wing, with its personnel and equipment reassigned to the reactivated 9th Bombardment Squadron, which became the first SAC operational bomb squadron to fly the FB-111A.

The crash of an F-111 at Nellis Air Force Base in December 1969 caused the grounding of all F and FB-111As. The group flew Lockheed T-33 T-Bird trainers until FB-111 flying activities resumed in June 1970 and delivery of resumed on 25 July 1970. By the end of September, the unit possessed twenty FB-111A aircraft. In January 1971, the FB-111A achieved initial operational capability with the 509th Bombardment Wing (393d and 715th Squadrons) at Pease Air Force Base, New Hampshire. When inactivated on 31 December 1971, the 340th possessed 38 FB-111As, which were transferred to Plattsburgh and Pease.

===== Linebacker II and subsequent Cold War years =====
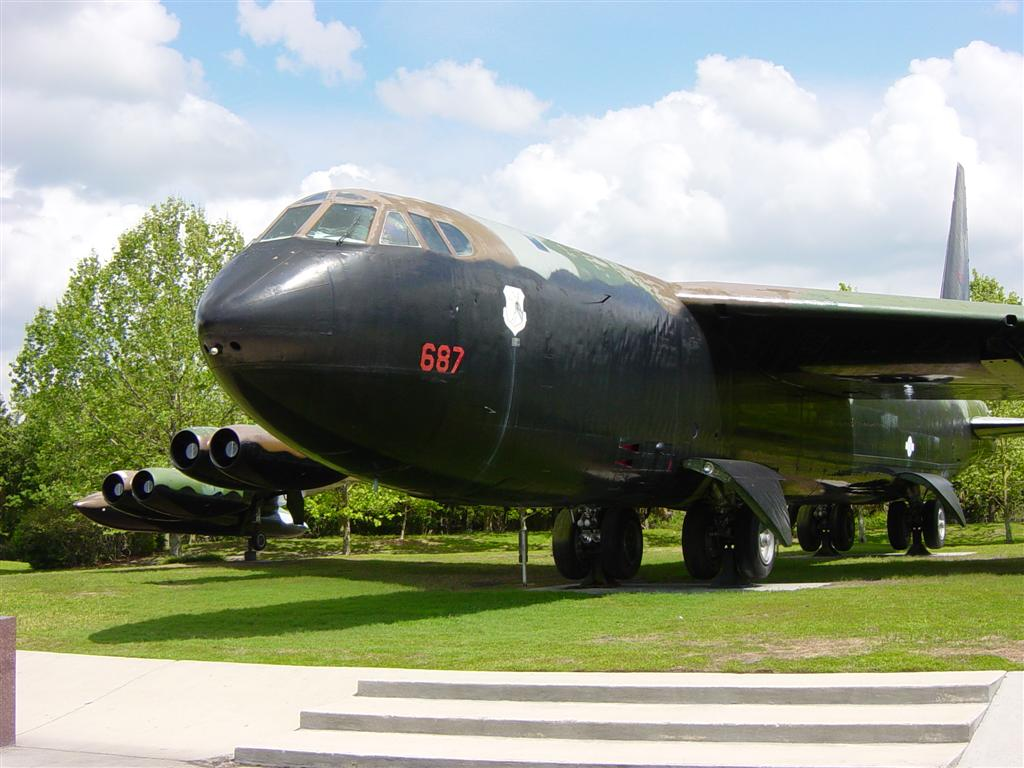
9th Bombardment Squadron B-52D Stratofortress (Note: Aircraft is Boeing B-52D-BO Stratofortress, serial 56-687. This aircraft is now on display at the B-52 Memorial Park, Orlando International Airport (former McCoy Air Fotce Base), Florida.)

With the FB-111 program ended at Carswell, the squadron returned to flying the B-52D Stratofortress, some in support of alert exercises and some in support of conventional bombing in Vietnam.

In early 1972, the unit returned to Andersen Air Force Base once again in support of Operation Arc Light. This time North Vietnam was the target. In October 1972, peace talks with the Vietnamese had reached an impasse. That, combined with increased enemy ground activity, was to see the 9th take part in a historical mission known as Linebacker II. Bombing targets in the Hanoi and Haiphong regions of North Vietnam, that mission helped bring the Vietnamese Communists back to the peace talks in Paris and a cease fire was signed on 28 January 1973. The 9th returned to Carswell in September 1973 and returned to their peacetime missions.

With the end of the Vietnam War, the 9th Bombardment Squadron remained at Carswell learning and training for their military mission. In late 1982 its B-52D models were retired and it received B-52H models from the inactivating 37th Bombardment Squadron at Ellsworth Air Force Base, South Dakota. With the B-52H's it stood on nuclear alert. Its B-52H bombers were on nuclear alert during Operation Desert Shield in 1991 and the squadron was not directly used in combat operations. However, in January 1991, three 9th Bombardment Squadron crews deployed to Diego Garcia to join crews from Loring AFB, Fairchild AFB, Castle AFB, and Griffis AFB, to comprise the 4300th Provisional Bomb Wing. Equipped with B-52Gs, the squadron was used in Operation Desert Shield as well as in Operation Desert Storm.

The 9th Bombardment Squadron transferred its B-52H's to the 2d Bombardment Wing at Barksdale Air Force Base, Louisiana during 1992, and the squadron was inactivated in August with the end of the Cold War and transfer of Carswell to the U.S. Navy as Naval Air Station Joint Reserve Base Fort Worth (Carswell Field).

=== Reformation from 1993 ===
Equipped with the Rockwell B-1B Lancer, the 9th Bomb Squadron was reactivated on 1 October 1993 at Dyess Air Force Base, Texas. It assumed responsibility for all B-1B initial qualification and instructor upgrade training for Air Combat Command. Since 2000, it has provided bombing, airlift support, training and combat support to combatant commanders.

Aircrew have flown conventional warfare taskings since 1993, when the 9th Bomb Squadron starting flying the B-1B. The unit flew more than 300 combat sorties during its four-month deployment in mid-2006 in support of the global war on terrorism.

During the military intervention against ISIL/Operation Inherent Resolve after 2011, the 9th Bomb Squadron played a pivotal role in the Battle of Kobanî. B-1 bombers were used in the battle. Hundreds of bombs were dropped throughout the course of the battle, and well over 1,000 ISIL fighters were killed. These airstrikes halted ISIL's progress in the city, and may well have been the reason why ISIL lost the battle.

After the battle was won, the squadron continued its air campaign in Syria, and contributed to many other ISIL defeats in the north of the region. Since the Battle of Kobanî, Kurdish fighters in the People's Protection Units, alongside allied Free Syrian Army fighters, recaptured over 500 towns and villages from ISIL, as well as the strategic towns of Suluk, Tall Abyad, and Ayn Issa, helped by air support from the squadron.

== Lineage ==
- Organized as the 9th Aero Squadron on 14 June 1917

Redesignated 9th Aero Squadron (Night Observation) August 1918
Redesignated 9th Corps Observation Squadron 22 July 1919
Redesignated 9th Squadron (Observation) on 14 March 1921
Inactivated on 29 June 1922
Redesignated 9th Observation Squadron on 25 January 1923
Redesignated 9th Bombardment Squadron on 24 March 1923

- Activated on 1 April 1931

Redesignated 9th Bombardment Squadron (Heavy) on 6 December 1939
Redesignated 9th Bombardment Squadron, Heavy on 13 July 1943
Inactivated on 6 January 1946

- Redesignated 9th Bombardment Squadron, Very Heavy and activated, on 1 October 1946

Redesignated 9th Bombardment Squadron, Heavy, on 20 July 1948
Discontinued and inactivated, on 25 June 1968

- Redesignated 9th Bombardment Squadron, Medium on 28 January 1969

Activated and organized on 2 July 1969
Redesignated 9th Bombardment Squadron, Heavy on 31 December 1971
Redesignated 9th Bomb Squadron on 1 September 1991
Inactivated on 15 August 1992

- Activated on 1 October 1993

=== Assignments ===
- Post Headquarters, Camp Kelly, 14 June-8 July 1917
- Post Headquarters, Camp Selfridge, 8 July-28 October 1917
- Aviation Concentration Center, 28 October- 7 December 1917
- American Expeditionary Forces, 25 March 1918

Attached to the Royal Flying Corps for training, 7 December 1917 – 16 August 1918

- Replacement Concentration Center, AEF, 16–23 August 1918
- 1st Air Depot, AEF, 23–28 August 1918
- First Army Observation Group, 30 August 1918
- Third Army Air Service, c. 21 November 1918
- VII Corps Observation Group, c. 21 November 1918
- 1st Air Depot, AEF, 18–25 May 1919
- Advanced Section Services of Supply, 25 May-7 June 1919
- Post Headquarters, Mitchell Field, 8 June 1919
- Western Department, c. 22 July 1919
- Ninth Corps Area, 20 August 1920 – 29 June 1922
- 7th Bombardment Group, 1 April 1931 – 6 January 1946

Attached to United States Army Middle East Air Force for operations, 28 June-c. 4 October 1942

- 7th Bombardment Group, 1 October 1946 (attached to 7th Bombardment Wing after 16 February 1951)
- 7th Bombardment Wing, 16 June 1952 – 25 June 1968
- 340th Bombardment Group, 2 July 1969
- 7th Bombardment Wing, 31 December 1971
- 7th Operations Group, 1 September 1991 – 15 August 1992
- 7th Operations Group, 1 October 1993 – present

=== Stations ===
World War I

- Camp Kelly, Texas, 14 June 1917
- Selfridge Field, Michigan, 8 July 1917
- Aviation Concentration Center, Garden City, New York, 28 October–22 November 1917
- Romsey Rest Camp, Winchester, England, c. 8 December

Squadron separated into flights for training with RFC
"A" Flight: South Charleton Aerodrome, Devon
"B" Flight: Scampton Aerodrome, Lincolnshire
"C" Flight: Spittlegate Aerodrome, Lincolnshire
"D" Flight: Harlaxton Aerodrome, Lincolnshire

- RFC Grantham, Lincolnshire, February, c. 28 December 1918 – 7 August 1918
- Southampton, England, 7 August 1918
- Le Havre, France, 13 August 1918
- St. Maixent Replacement Barracks, France, 16 August 1918
- Colombey-les-Belles Airdrome, France, 23 August 1918
- Amanty Airdrome, 28 August 1918
- Vavincourt Aerodrome, France, 21 September 1918
- Preutin-Higny Aerodrome, France, 21 November 1918
- Trier Airdrome, Germany, 5 December 1918
- Colombey-les-Belles Airdrome, France, 18 May 1919
- Marseille, France, 25 May-7 June 1919

Inter-War period

- Park Field, Tennessee, 12 July 1919
- March Field, California, 22 July 1919
- Rockwell Field, California, 2 August 1919

Flight operated from Calexico Field, California, to Apr 1920

- March Field, California, 15 November 1919
- Rockwell Field, California, 11 December 1919
- Mather Field, California, 27 April 1920 – 29 June 1922
- March Field, California, 1 April 1931
- Hamilton Field, California, 5 December 1934
- Fort Douglas, Utah, 7 September 1940
- Salt Lake City Army Air Base, Utah, 13 January-13 November 1941

World War II

- Brisbane, Australia, 22 December 1941 – 4 February 1942 (ground echelon)

Air echelon operated from Singosari Airfield, Java, 13–19 January 1942; from Jogjakarta Airfield, Java, 19 January-c. 1 March 1942

- Karachi Airport, India, c. 8 March 1942 (air echelon), 14 March 1942 (ground echelon)
- Allahabad, India (air echelon at Baumrauli, India), 27 April-29 June 1942
- RAF Lydda, Palestine, 2 July-4 October 1942
- Karachi Airport, India, 5 October 1942

Operated from Gaya Airfield, India, 14 November-12 Dec 1942

- Pandaveswar Airfield, India, 12 December 1942
- Kurmitola Airfield, India, 11 June 1944
- Pandaveswar Airfield, India, 1 October 1944
- Tezpur Airfield, India, 1 June-7 December 1945
- Camp Kilmer, New Jersey, 5–6 January 1946

United States Air Force

- Fort Worth Army Air Field (later Griffiss Air Force Base, Carswell Air Force Base), Texas, 1 October 1946 – 25 June 1968
- Carswell Air Force Base, Texas, 2 July 1969 – 15 August 1992
- Dyess Air Force Base, Texas, since 1 October 1993
- Ørland Main Air Station, Norway, since 27 February 2021 (BTF Deployment)

=== Aircraft ===
World War I

- Curtiss JN-4, 1917
- Sopwith Camel (1917)
- Sopwith Scout (1917)
- Breguet 14 (1918–1919)
- Royal Aircraft Factory F.E.2 (1918–1919)
- LVG C.VI (1919)
- Fokker D.VII (1919)
- Pfalz D.XII (1919)
- DFW C.V (1919)
- Halberstadt CL.IV (1919)
- Halberstadt C.V (1919)
- Rumpler C.I (1919)
- Hannover CL.III (1919)

Inter-War period

- Dayton-Wright DH-4 (1919–1922)
- Thomas-Morse O-19 (1931–1934)
- Douglas O-38 (1931–1934)
- Keystone B-3 (1931–1934)
- Keystone B-4 (1931–1934)
- Martin B-12 (1934–1937)
- Martin B-10 (1935–1938)
- Douglas OA-4 Dolphin (1937)
- Douglas B-18 Bolo (1937–1941)

World War II

- Boeing B-17 Flying Fortress (1940–1942)
- Consolidated LB-30 Liberator (1942)
- Consolidated B-24 Liberator (1942–1945)

United States Air Force

- Boeing B-29 Superfortress (1946–1948)
- Convair B-36A Peacemaker, 1948–1950
- Convair B-36D Peacemaker, 1950–1952
- Convair B-36F Peacemaker, 1952–1953
- Convair B-36H Peacemaker, 1953–1958
- Boeing B-52F Stratofortress, 1958–1968
- General Dynamics FB-111A, 1969–1971
- Boeing B-52D Stratofortress, 1971–1982
- Boeing B-52H Stratofortress, 1982–1993
- Rockwell B-1B Lancer, 1993 – present

== See also ==
- List of American Aero Squadrons
- United States Army Air Forces in Australia
- List of B-52 Units of the United States Air Force
