= Battle of Ciudad Juárez (1919) =

Battle of the Mexican Revolution

Coordinates: 31°43′52″N 106°27′45″W

Third Battle of Ciudad Juarez
- Part of the Mexican Revolution, Border War
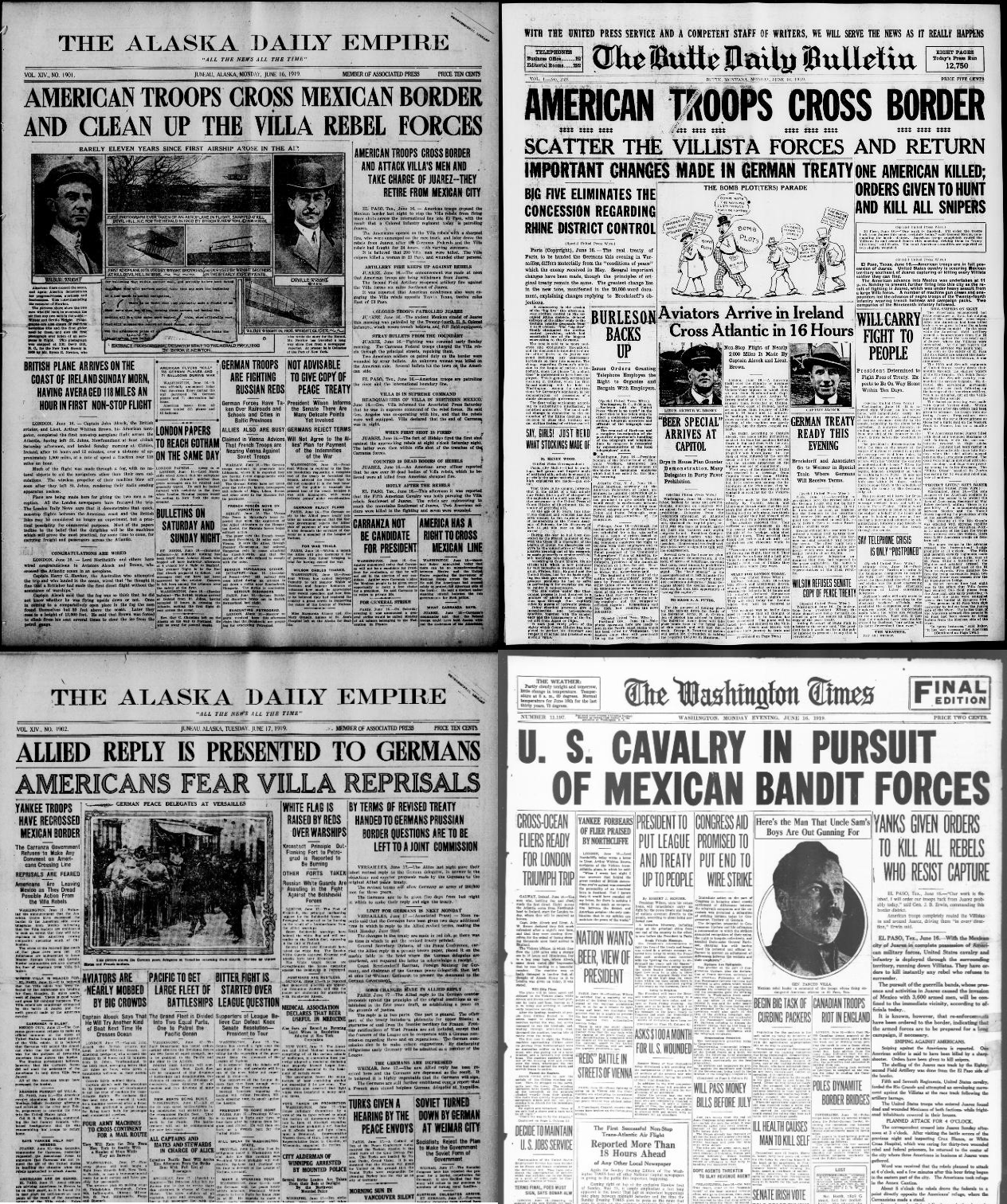
- News Coverage of the Battle of Ciudad Juárez
Date	June 15–16, 1919
Location	Ciudad Juarez, Chihuahua, Mexico; El Paso, Texas, United States
Result	United States/Carrancista victory

Belligerents
Villistas: División del Norte	Carrancistas: Constitutional Army	United States: United States Army

Commanders and leaders
Pancho Villa; Felipe Ángeles	Pablo González Garza	(United States) James B. Erwin (United States) Selah H. R. Tompkins

Strength
9,500 revolutionary Pancho Villa	7,300 Mexican soldiers	8,600 American soldiers

Casualties and losses
~150 killed or wounded	67 Mexican soldiers and 27 civilians killed	2 killed 10 wounded
- U.S. Civilian Casualties: 2 killed 4 wounded

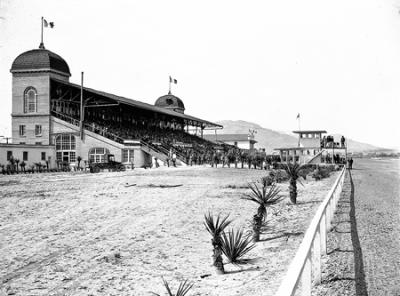
The Juarez Racetrack on June 16, 1919. Note the cannonball hole in the north cupola of the grandstand, caused by American artillery in El, Paso Texas

The Third Battle of Ciudad Juarez, or simply the Battle of Juarez, was the final major battle involving the rebels of Francisco "Pancho" Villa. It began on June 15, 1919, when Villa attempted to capture the border city of Ciudad Juarez from the Mexican Army. During the engagement the Villistas provoked an intervention by the United States Army protecting the neighboring city of El Paso, Texas. The Americans routed the Villistas in what became the second largest battle of the Mexican Revolution involving the US, and the last battle of the Border War. With the American army closing in, the Villistas had no choice but to retreat. Pancho Villa then attacked Durango but lost again, so he retired to his home at Parral, Chihuahua in 1920, with a full pardon from the Carrancista government.

== Background ==
Following the Battle of Columbus and Gen. John J. Pershing's Mexican Expedition in 1916 and 1917, Pancho Villa's army was scattered across northern Mexico, but by 1918 he had assembled several hundred men and began attacking the Carrancistas again. The Villistas were mostly unsuccessful in their final campaign. Though they captured Parral and took several smaller towns, they chose not to attack the city of Chihuahua because of its large garrison. Instead, Villa turned his attention to Ciudad Juarez in the summer of 1919. According to Friedrich Katz, author of The Life and Times of Pancho Villa, his motivations for attacking Ciudad Juarez are unclear. Katz says that Villa wanted to put one of his generals, Felipe Ángeles, up to it because in the past he had spoken of the "need for reconciliation with the Americans" and the hope that the US would then "change its attitude" toward the Villistas. Katz also says that Villa may have chosen to attack Juarez because there was a smaller enemy garrison there than in Chihuahua, there was a large source of food and—possibly—to see if the Americans, just across the Rio Grande, were still as hostile as they had been during Pershing's campaign. The new Carrancista commander in northeastern Mexico, Gen. Juan Agustin Castro, was also factored in. According to Katz, Castro was not as aggressive as his predecessor and was "content to fortify himself in a few towns without ever taking offensive action." Therefore, Villa felt "relatively confident" that he could win the battle for Juarez without having to worry about Castro attacking him from the rear. Villa's army consisted of over 4,000 infantry and cavalry but he had no artillery support. The Carrancista forces, under Gen. Pablo González Garza, numbered nearly 3,000 and had fortified Juarez and occupied the citadel, Fort Hidalgo. Gen. Gonzalez also had artillery and two other important advantages: he would be fighting a defensive battle and was protected on the northern flank by El Paso and the American army.

== Battle ==
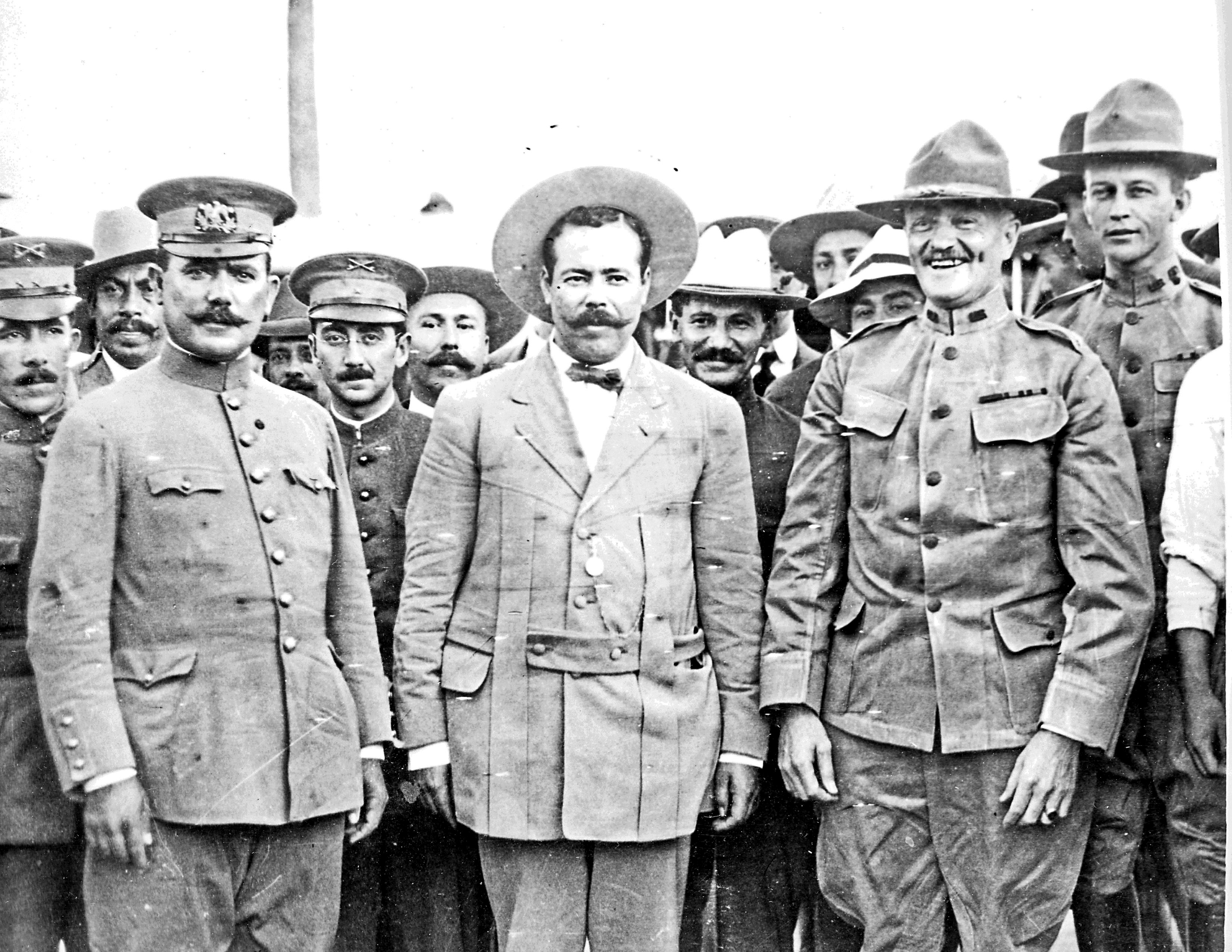
Generals Alvaro Obregon, Pancho Villa and John J. Pershing pose after a meeting at Fort Bliss, TX, in 1913. Immediately behind Pershing is his aide, Lt.--and future general--George S. Patton.

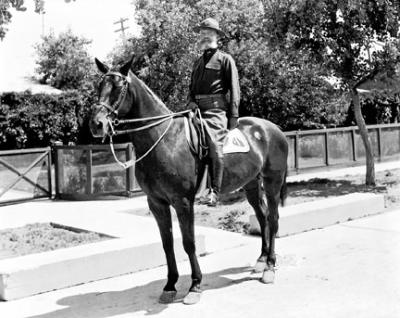
Col. Selah H.R. "Tommy" Tompkins on June 16, 1919, at the Ciudad Juarez Racetrack.

Pancho Villa arrived at Ciudad Juarez on the night of June 14, 1919. He first concentrated his forces in an attack on Fort Hidalgo at 12:10 am on June 15, but was repulsed after a 50-minute battle. Gen. Martin Lopez, Villa's godson, led the attack because Villa was sick at the time. At about 1:10 am Lopez attacked the city itself. The cavalry charged ahead of the infantry and advanced in a way so that no bullets were crossing the border into El Paso. At first the Villistas seemed to be making progress—they cut through barbed wire entanglements with wire cutters smuggled in from the US and routed a line of Carrancista infantry. Then, as Lopez proceeded into the city streets, the advance began to slow. For the rest of the morning and throughout day the two sides fought a bloody close-quarters engagement. Gen. Gonzalez was held up in the Municipal Palace and observing the battle from the rooftop. As his lines crumbled he asked his assistant, Col. Escobar, why his forces were not holding. Escobar told him it was because the "Villistas were attacking like rabid dogs." Escobar also advised that Gonzales withdraw his forces into the nearby fortress, or else be overrun. Gonzalez agreed with Escobar so the order was given to retreat and the Villistas took complete control of the city. When he got to the fort, Gonzalez used the telephone to contact the American garrison across the river and request aid. Though the Americans had already begun assembling infantry, cavalry and artillery from Fort Bliss, they had not yet received orders.

Villa knew his only chance of getting into the fort was by utilizing some captured Carrancista artillery pieces. Gen. Angeles was put in command of this effort and had to move the artillery from their positions in Juarez to the fort outside the town before beginning the attack (Byron Jackson says that Ángeles did not participate in this battle, but instead remained at Villa’s headquarters eight miles south) This took a while and by the time the task was finished Gen. Gonzalez had come up with a daring plan to use the majority of his cavalry and his infantry in a charge against Angeles' column as it approached the fort. The charge successfully routed Angeles and sent him fleeing back to Juarez, but the Villistas were able to hold onto the downtown area. Meanwhile, on the Texas side of the border, American soldiers were being targeted by Villista snipers who directed their fire towards the 82nd Field Artillery Regiment's headquarters at the El Paso Union Stockyards. Several American soldiers were wounded but the troops did not return fire. Additionally, two civilians had been killed and four more were wounded. The first, a man named Floyd Hinton, was killed while watching the fighting from his rooftop near the intersection of Ninth and El Paso streets. The second, a Mrs. Ed. Dominguez, was shot in the head while sitting on her doorstep at 309 East Eighth Street. The US government later conducted an investigation into which faction was responsible for the casualties and suggested that the Villistas were to blame. The Americans, under Brig. Gen. James B. Erwin, did not respond to the sniping until 10:35 pm when Pvt. Sam Tusco of the 82nd Field Artillery was killed and Pvt. Burchard F. Casey was severely wounded. At about 11:00 pm, after Gen. Erwin learned of the casualties, he sent 3,600 men across the Santa Fe Street bridge, over the Rio Grande, to stop the sniping and provide protection for American citizens there.

Erwin's forces included two battalions of the African American 24th Infantry, the 82nd Field Artillery, and the 2nd Cavalry Brigade, composed of the 5th Cavalry Regiment and the 7th Cavalry Regiment. Heavy skirmishing ensued and the Carrancistas returned to their fort so that only the Americans and the Villistas would be engaged. The 24th Infantry crossed the Santa Fe Bridge and advanced through the center of Ciudad Juarez, with the 1st Battalion, 82nd Field Artillery, supporting from downtown El Paso. The 5th Cavalry and the 7th Cavalry crossed the Rio Grande downstream in an attempt to catch the Villistas in a pincer movement. At 12:30 am, on June 16, the artillery opened fire from El Paso at the Villista-held Juarez Racetrack and continued pounding it effectively until 1:00 am, when the order to cease fire was given. By the time the bombardment was over, 1st Battalion had fired a total of 64 shrapnel rounds from two batteries. 3rd Battalion, 82nd Field Artillery, was in position and ready to fire but never got a chance to engage. The Americans reached Palazio Commercio in Juarez at about 4:00 am. The Villistas were retreating so the cavalry, under Col. Selah "Tommy" Tompkins, and the 2nd Battalion of 82nd Field Artillery pursued the rebels to the south. At about 7:00 am, six miles southeast of Juarez, the Americans encountered a large force of Villistas, divided into three sections. The cavalry charged immediately. The attached artillery unlimbered its guns and fired at 4,000 yards from the Villistas' position. The first salvo was a direct hit, shrapnel rounds wiped out one of the sections completely and forced the other two units to "scatter in different directions." This encounter was over by 9:00 am but later that day, as the Americans continued their pursuit, Battery D, 2nd Battalion, bombarded an adobe shack and afterwards found the bodies of about 25 dead and wounded Villistas.

== Aftermath ==
When the pursuit was finally discontinued, Col. Tompkins headed back north to the Rio Grande, collecting 50 saddles, 300 horses and mules and over 100 rifles that were left behind by the Villistas. Many of the guns were of German manufacture, so they were taken as souvenirs by the soldiers. Including Pvt. Sam Tusco and the men wounded before the intervention, two American soldiers were killed and ten were wounded during the fighting. The Carrancistas' casualties are unknown and the Americans reported that they killed or wounded at least 100 Villistas, including Gen. Lopez. There are likely to have been a lot more casualties than were reported. Villa said the following in an interview with the El Paso Morning Times, on June 19, 1919:

Conscious that the [American] bombardment was causing large numbers of casualties among the civilian population, and considering it senseless to carry on a battle against an enemy superior not only in numbers but in equipment, I ordered the evacuation of Ciudad Juarez and the dispersion of my troops until further notice ... I came through here because, smarting as I am to lose an important battle, there is something here that alleviates my affliction ... Three days ago I lost several of my best officers and hundreds of my humblest men. Those that carry no stars or eagles on their straw hats, afflicts me the most.

Villa's statement has been questioned; the American artillery that bombarded Juarez focused solely on the racetrack, Villa's base, and most of his men deserted after the battle rather than being ordered to disperse. When Villa besieged Durango just a few weeks later he only had about 350 "bady demoralized" men left, according to a representative of the Mexico North Western Railway. The siege failed when the Carrancistas launched a surprise attack with trains on the Villistas' rear, forcing them to retreat.

Durango was Pancho Villa's last battle. He then led the remnants of his army into the Sierra Madre and used his newly formed Aerial Corps to fly surveillance missions and bomb enemy convoys and any soldiers who attempted to enter the mountains. Villa was said to have been very upset with the intervention by American soldiers during his attack on Juarez. According to the same railroad representative; "Villa made every effort to capture the only American in the vicinity of Villa Ahumada, and told his men they had permission to kill any and all Americans encountered in the future. He also told the Mexican people that if any of them were guilty of working for or doing business with Americans in future, he would return someday and kill them." There is no evidence that Villa's men killed any Americans after the battle for Juarez, though there was a raid on the town of Ruby, Arizona, in February 1920, that may have been the work of Villistas. By August 1920 Villa had had enough, so he surrendered to the Carrancistas. Given a full pardon, Villa retired to a large hacienda in the town of Canutillo in the state of Durango near to the frontier with Chihuahua, with a bodyguard of 50 men. Three years later, on July 20, 1923, he was assassinated while visiting the city of Parral. The assassins were most likely agents sent by Alvaro Obregon, who had become president after ordering the death of Venustiano Carranza on May 21, 1920.

A National Guard camp was later named Camp Tusco [sic].

The 82nd Field Artillery's unit insignia comprises a black artillery shell on a white background, symbolizing the first shot fired by the regiment over the Rio Grande.

== See also ==
- Garza Revolution
- Las Cuevas War
- Candelaria border incursion of 1919

== Bibliography ==
- Beede, Benjamin R. (1994). The War of 1898, and U.S. interventions, 1898–1934: an encyclopedia. Taylor & Francis. ISBN 0-8240-5624-8.
- Cantu, Carlos H. (2004). Pancho Villa's Golden Hawks. LibrosEnRed. ISBN 987-561-102-6.
- Katz, Friedrich (1998). The life and times of Pancho Villa. Stanford University Press. ISBN 0-8047-3046-6.
- United States Congress, United States Senate (1920). Investigation of Mexican Affairs: Hearing before a subcommittee of the Committee on Foreign Relations United States Senate Sixty-Sixth Congress First Session Pursuant to S. Res. 106. United States Government Printing Office.
