= Calexico International Airport =

International airport in Calexico, California, United States

Coordinates: 32°40′10″N 115°30′48″W

- IATA: CXL; ICAO: KCXL; FAA LID: CXL

Summary
- Airport type: Public
- Owner: City of Calexico
- Serves: Calexico, California
- Elevation AMSL: 4 ft (1.2 m)
- Interactive map of Calexico International Airport

Runways
Direction	Length		Surface
Direction	ft	m	Surface
8/26	4,679	1,426	Asphalt

Statistics (2004)
- Aircraft operations: 12,240
- Based aircraft: 23
- Source: Federal Aviation Administration

Calexico International Airport (IATA: CXL, ICAO: KCXL, FAA LID: CXL) is a city-owned public-use airport located one mile (1.6 km) west of the central business district of Calexico, in Imperial County, California. The airport is mostly used for general aviation and to facilitate border crossing.

== Facilities and aircraft ==
Calexico International Airport covers an area of 257 acres (104 ha) which contains one asphalt paved runway (8/26) measuring 4,679 x 75 ft (1,426 x 23 m). For the 12-month period ending December 31, 2004, the airport had 12,240 aircraft operations, an average of 33 per day: 93% general aviation and 7% air taxi. At that time there were 23 aircraft based at this airport: 83% single-engine and 17% multi-engine.
