= Texas Western Press =

- Parent company: University of Texas at El Paso
- Founded: 1952
- Founder: Carl Hertzog
- Country of origin: United States
- Headquarters location: El Paso, Texas
- Publication types: Books
- Official website: twp.utep.edu

Texas Western Press of the University of Texas at El Paso was founded in 1952 by Carl Hertzog, internationally renowned typographer, book designer, and printer. The distinctive Hertzog colophon and his incomparable touches continued to appear in Texas Western Press publications until his death in 1984. The mission of Texas Western Press is the publication of books on the history and cultures of the American Southwest, particularly historical and biographical works about West Texas, New Mexico, northern Mexico, and the U.S. borderlands. The Press also publishes selected books in the areas of regional art, photography, Native American studies, geography, demographics, border issues, politics, and natural history.

Texas Western Press is a member of the Association of University Presses.

== See also ==
- List of English-language book publishing companies
- List of university presses
