= Sanderson Field (Texas) =

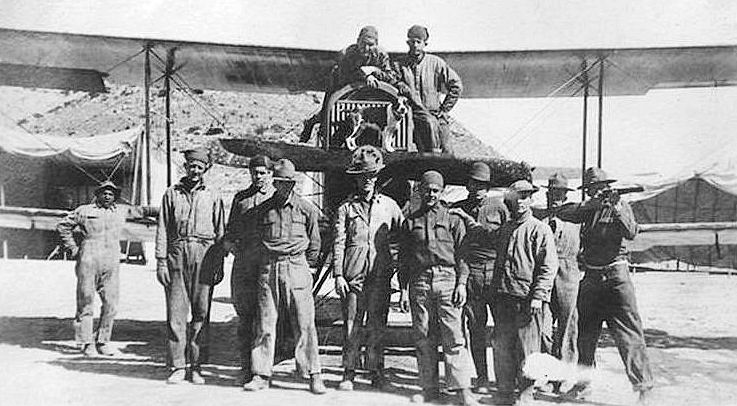
- De Havilland DH-4 bomber with members of the 90th Squadron (Surveillance) at Sanderson Field, Texas, ca 1920.
- IATA: none; ICAO: none

Summary
- Built: 1919
- In use: 1919-1921
- Coordinates: 30°08′32″N 102°24′11″W

Map
- Sanderson Field, Texas

Sanderson Field is a former military airfield, located in Sanderson, Texas. It was used by the 90th Squadron (Surveillance) (Later Attack) between 1919 and 1921.

== History ==
Sanderson Field was established by the Air Service, United States Army in 1919. The 464th Aero Construction Squadron had been sent from Kelly Field, near San Antonio to establish an airfield in Sanderson to carry out observation overflights along the Mexican Border. During this period, Mexico was enduring a period of revolution and unrest, which led to border violations and the deaths of American citizens.

The airfield consisted mostly of tents, both for the men and as hangars for aircraft. The only permanent wood structures came in the summer of 1920 when Eagle Pass Field was closed and the buildings moved to Sanderson. The 90th Squadron arrived in November, with a detachment (A) operating from Eagle Pass Field. It flew de Havilland DH-4 aircraft, built in the United States, the type used as bombers during World War I in France.

Almost immediately the patrols began. Operations from Sanderson consisted of patrols west, along the Rio Grande as far as Lajitas in the Big Bend, then turn and fly back. Eastbound patrols headed as far as the Devil’s River, then returned.

As the unrest in Mexico died down by the middle of 1921, the 90th reunited and moved back to Kelly Field in July. The history of the airfield after this point is unknown, and it was apparently abandoned, the land redeveloped as part of the city of Sanderson.
