= Eagle Pass Municipal Airport =

Eagle Pass Municipal Airport Eagle Pass Field
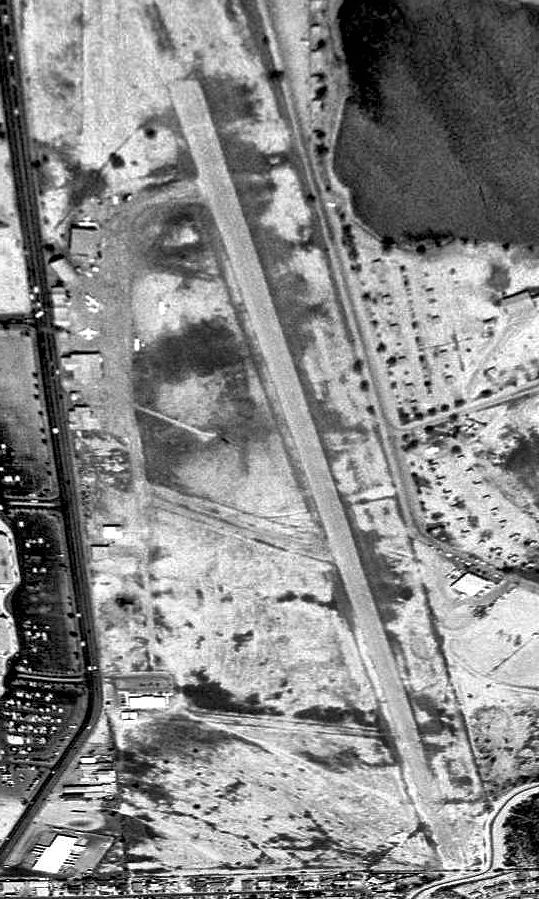
- Eagle Pass Municipal Airport, 3 July 1996
- IATA: none; ICAO: none; FAA LID: EGP

Summary
- Built: 1919
- In use: 1919-1996
- Coordinates: 28°42′08″N 100°28′54″W

Map
- Eagle Pass Municipal Airport, Texas

Runways
Direction	Length		Surface
Direction	ft	m	Surface
16/34	3,025	922	Asphalt
- Runway information from: Abandoned & Little-Known Airfields:Texas - Laredo area

Eagle Pass Municipal Airport is a former airport, located in Eagle Pass, Texas. Airport operations ended around 1998, being transferred to the Maverick County Memorial International Airport. Today the former airport is a commercial site.

== History ==
Eagle Pass Municipal Airport was established by the Air Service, United States Army in 1919 as a military airfield. It was constructed as a base for observation overflights along the Mexican border. During this period, Mexico was enduring a period of revolution and unrest, which led to border violations and the deaths of American citizens.

Flight "A" of the 90th Squadron (Surveillance) arrived at Eagle Pass Field on 27 August 1919 with de Havilland DH-4 aircraft, and flew observation missions along the border. A very young James H. Doolittle was stationed at Eagle Pass with Flight A of the 90th. On one trip he is said to have flown under the Pecos River railroad bridge on a dare, and, apparently, without a reprimand from his superiors. One mission that Doolittle carried out as an engineering officer was to go into Mexico and recover a plane which had crash-landed. The Army ordered downed planes in Mexico destroyed to prevent the technology from being recovered by the Mexican government. However, when the plane was found, Doolittle thought it was repairable. Using carrier pigeons for communications, he ordered a new Liberty engine for the aircraft, which was subsequently delivered by parachute to the landing site. Piloting the repaired airplane himself, Doolittle took off from a 400-yard airstrip quickly hacked out of the terrain and flew back to Texas.

The 90th operated from Eagle Pass until it was moved to Del Rio Field, Texas, on 12 Jun 1920, although it was used sporadically until the Border Patrol operation ended in June 1921.

The next use of the airfield was when the Department of Commerce refitted the facility as one of its network of Intermediate Landing Fields, which were established in the 1920s & 1930s to serve as emergency landing fields along commercial airways between major cities. the 1934 Department of Commerce Airfield Directory described the "Eagle Pass Airport" as being located on the eastern edge of the city on Highway 85, and described the airfield as being a rectangular sod field. It was closed during World War II due to security concerns.

Sometime in 1945, the airport was re-opened as commercial/municipal airport. It was described as having a 3,000' unpaved runway. The runway at Eagle Pass was evidently paved at some point, being described in January 1961 as having a 2,600' hard-surface runway. A secondary runway (12/3) was constructed, having a 580' asphalt, with a 1,730' turf extension in 1963. Five hangars were depicted on a paved ramp along the west side. The operators were listed as Al Apts Aero Service & Border Aero Services. By 1985, the main runway 16/34 had been lengthened to 3,025', and the operator was listed as Bravo Aero Service.

In the late 1990s, Eagle Pass Municipal Airport was closed and general aviation operations moved to Bowles Airfield, being renamed Maverick County Memorial International Airport (FAA: 5T9).

With its closure the land was subdivided and redeveloped for other uses. Today the land is indistinguishable from its aviation past, being the site of a large US Post Office, a Walmart Supercenter and other commercial activities.
