= 90th Fighter Squadron =

90th Fighter Squadron

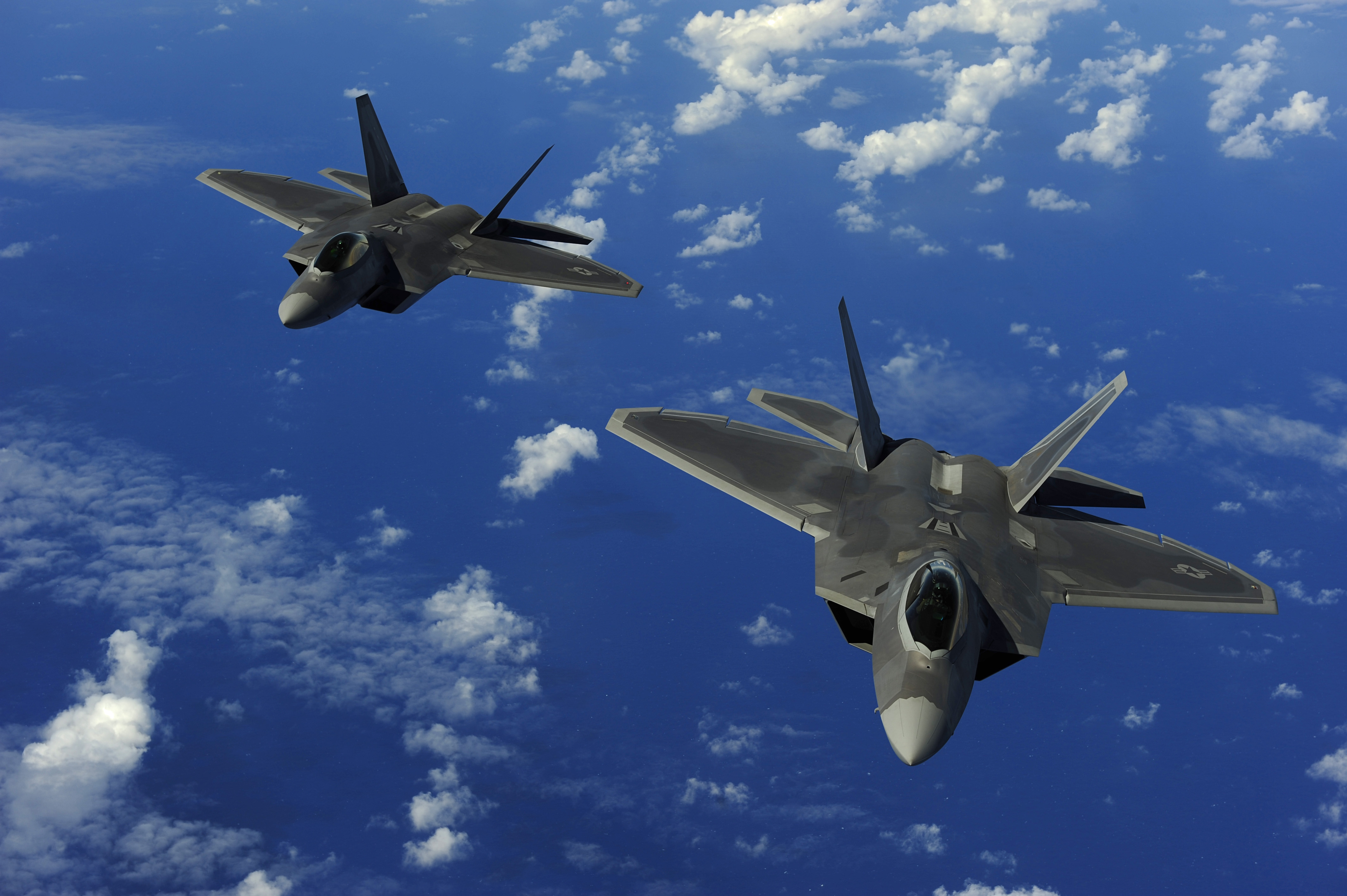
- U.S. Air Force F-22 Raptors assigned to the 90th Fighter Squadron
- Active: 20 August 1917 – 1 October 1949; 25 June 1951 – present
- Country: United States
- Branch: United States Air Force
- Role: Air Superiority
- Size: Squadron
- Part of: Pacific Air Forces: Eleventh Air Force; 3rd Wing; 3rd Operations Group
- Garrison/HQ: Elmendorf Air Force Base, Alaska
- Nickname: The Dicemen
- Colors: Red
- Fuselage Code: "AK"
- Engagements: World War I; World War II - Antisubmarine; World War II - Asia-Pacific Theater; Korean War; Vietnam War; Vietnam Ceasefire; Operation Deny Flight Operation Joint Endeavor Operation Northern Watch, Afghanistan Campaign

- Decorations: Distinguished Unit Citation (8x); Air Force Outstanding Unit Award with Combat "V" Device (5x); Air Force Outstanding Unit Award (18x); Philippine Presidential Unit Citation; Republic of Vietnam Gallantry Cross with Palm

Commanders
- Current commander: Lt Col Ryan "Rase" Graf
- Notable commanders: Hoyt S. Vandenberg; Nathan F. Twining; Richard H. Ellis

Insignia
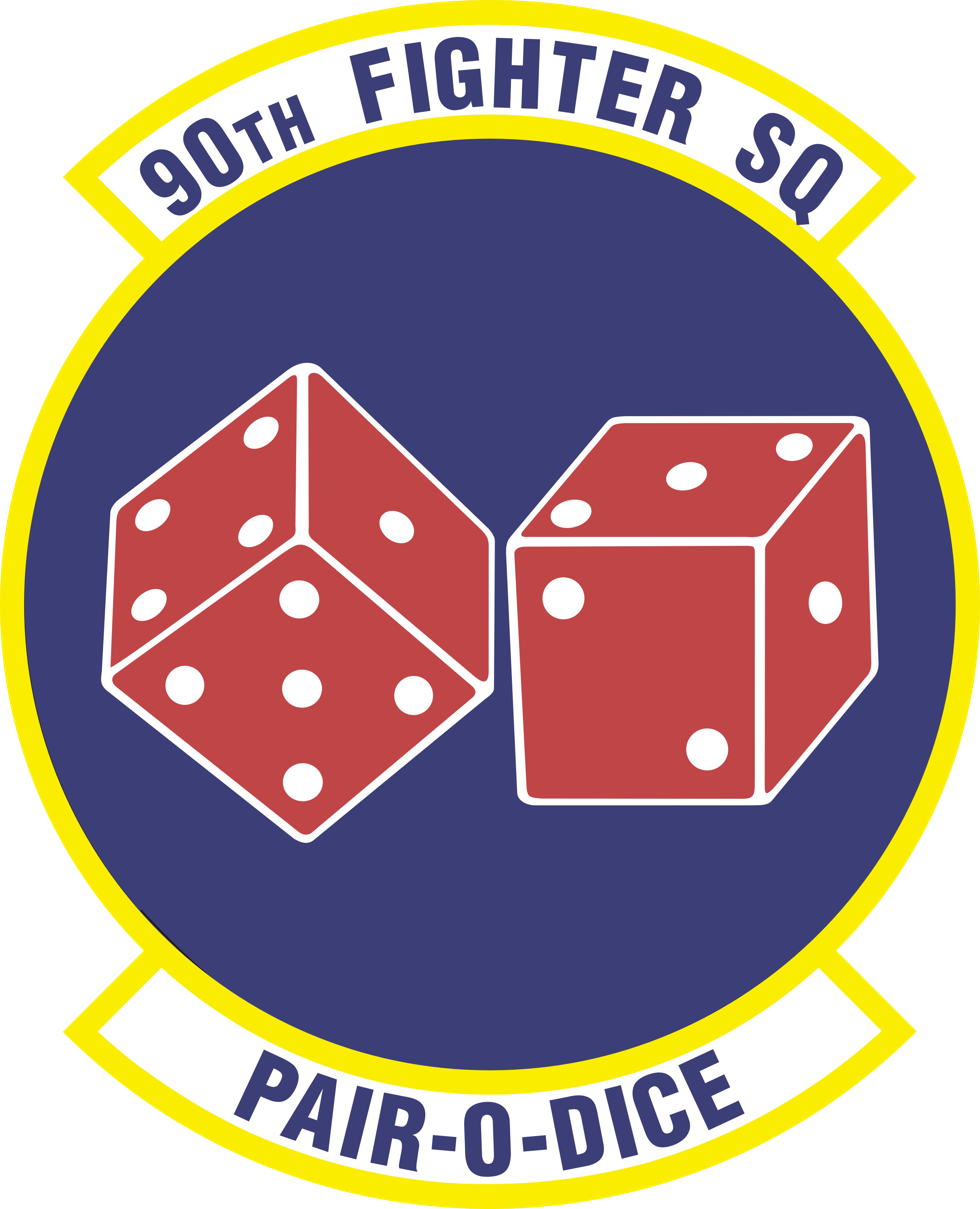
- 90th Fighter Squadron emblem

The 90th Fighter Squadron is a squadron of the United States Air Force. It is assigned to the 3rd Operations Group, based out of Elmendorf Air Force Base in Alaska and part of the Pacific Air Forces. The squadron is equipped with the F-22 Raptor fighter aircraft.

The 90 FS is one of the oldest units in the United States Air Force, first being organized as the 90th Aero Squadron on 20 August 1917 at Kelly Field, Texas. The squadron deployed to France and fought on the Western Front during World War I as a Corps observation squadron.

During World War II, the unit earned the Distinguished Unit Citation and the Presidential Unit Citation for its services in the Pacific Theater of Operations (PTO) as part of Fifth Air Force. During the Cold War the squadron fought in the Korean War and Vietnam War.

== Mission ==
The 90th Fighter Squadron trains in the fighter missions of offensive counter-air (OCA) and defensive counter-air (DCA), as well as strategic attack and interdiction.

== History ==
=== World War I ===
see 90th Aero Squadron for an expanded history of World War I operations

The 90th Fighter Squadron origins begin with Special Order 104, Headquarters Kelly Field, San Antonio, Texas, on 25 September 1917. The men in it were largely from two detachments; one from Vancouver Barracks, Washington, which arrived at Kelly Field on 18 August; another from Fort Leavenworth, Kansas, which arrived on 25 August. Both of these detachments had been held from the date of their arrival until 25 September under Recruit Camp Headquarters as a Provisional Squadron.

The first few months of its existence were consumed by the necessary training to prepare the men for operations in France during World War I. On 30 September, the squadron left Kelly Field for the Aviation Concentration Center, Camp Mills, Garden City, New York, Long Island, where it arrived five days later. On the night of 5 October the squadron detrained, and early next morning hiked out to Field No. 2 of the Aviation Concentration Center (Hazelhurst Field), where they were quartered with the Headquarters of the First Provisional Wing in Barracks No. 5. Here they stayed for several weeks performing guard duty and fatigue work, and carrying on the work of organization, equipment and preparation for overseas duty.

On 26 October, orders were received to pack up equipment and to prepare for immediate overseas departure. The following day the squadron was moved to Pier 54, New York Harbor, and boarded the SS Orduña. The crossing of the Atlantic was uneventful, and on 10 November the Orduna moved into the dock at Liverpool, England.

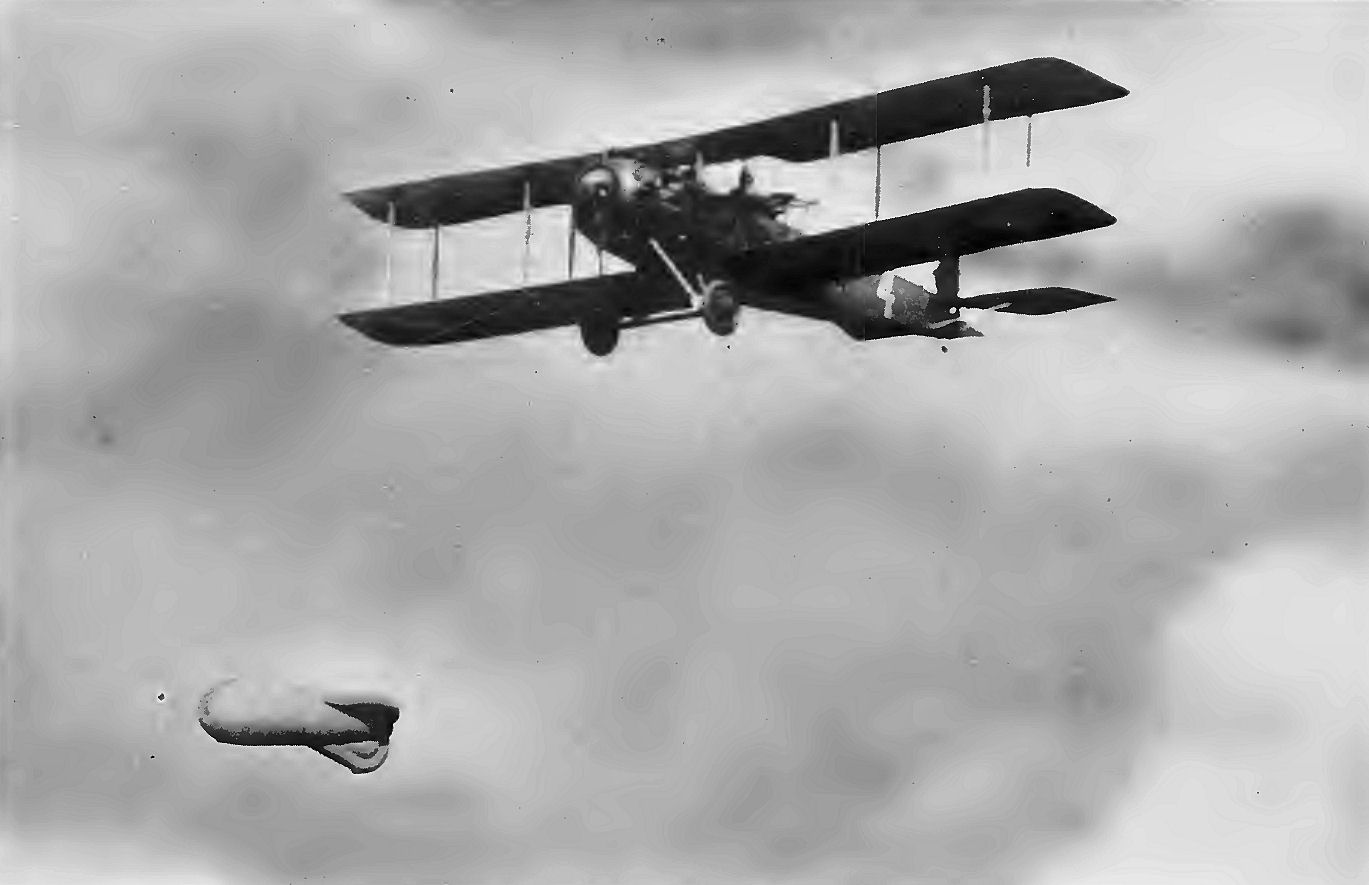
90th Aero Squadron – Salmson 2A2

On 12 November 1917 the men of the 90th arrived at Le Havre, France. Boarding the famous "Hommes 40, Chevaux 8" railroad box cars (maximum capacity of 40 men or eight horses,) they were shipped to Colombey-les-Belles Airdrome for what they thought would be immediate deployment to the front. But, to their great disappointment, they were given the assignment of road and barracks construction work, building the large 1st Air Depot and staging area which would eventually process and equip a large number of Americans that would arrive in France during 1918.

After seven months at Colombey, the 90th Aero Squadron was designed as a Corps Observation squadron, being assigned to the III Corps Observation Group on 11 June 1918. Two days later it reached what was called the "Zone of Advance" (combat area) at Ourches Aerodrome. The squadron's first aircraft were the Sopwith 1½ Strutter ground attack aircraft. At Ourches, the 90th and other squadrons were engaged in combat operations, both in aerial combat and aerial reconnaissance photography. It took part in operations in the Toul Sector, the Battle of Saint-Mihiel and the first and second Meuse-Argonne Offensives. Later, the squadron upgraded to Salmson 2-A2s SPAD Xis, and Breguet BR-14 observation aircraft. Due to ever-present low clouds and rain, the flyers were forced to drop dangerously close to the ground to carry out their missions, usually in the worst conditions.

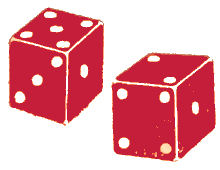
90th Aero Squadron "Lucky 7 dice emblem"

The 90th Aero Squadron carried out many reconnaissances, engaged in 23 combats and relieved official confirmation for 7 aerial victories. The group's lucky "Seven Up" emblem of red dice with white dots reading "7" no matter which way it was tallied, proved prophetic, for they suffered 3 casualties, consisting of 2 killed and 1 wounded. In September 1918 it took part in the final allied offensives. The 90th earned a positive reputation for its ground attack missions during its continuous participation in the air offensive over Saint-Mihiel. Its first commander, First Lieutenant William G. Schauffler, designed the 90th's Pair o' Dice emblem displaying natural sevens during this campaign.

After the Armistice with Germany on 11 November 1918, little flying was done, most of the pilots and observers being absent on leave or returning to the States. On 15 January 1919 the squadron's planes were turned in to the 1st Air Depot, Colombey-les-Belles Airdrome, and there, practically all of the pilots and observers were detached from the squadron.

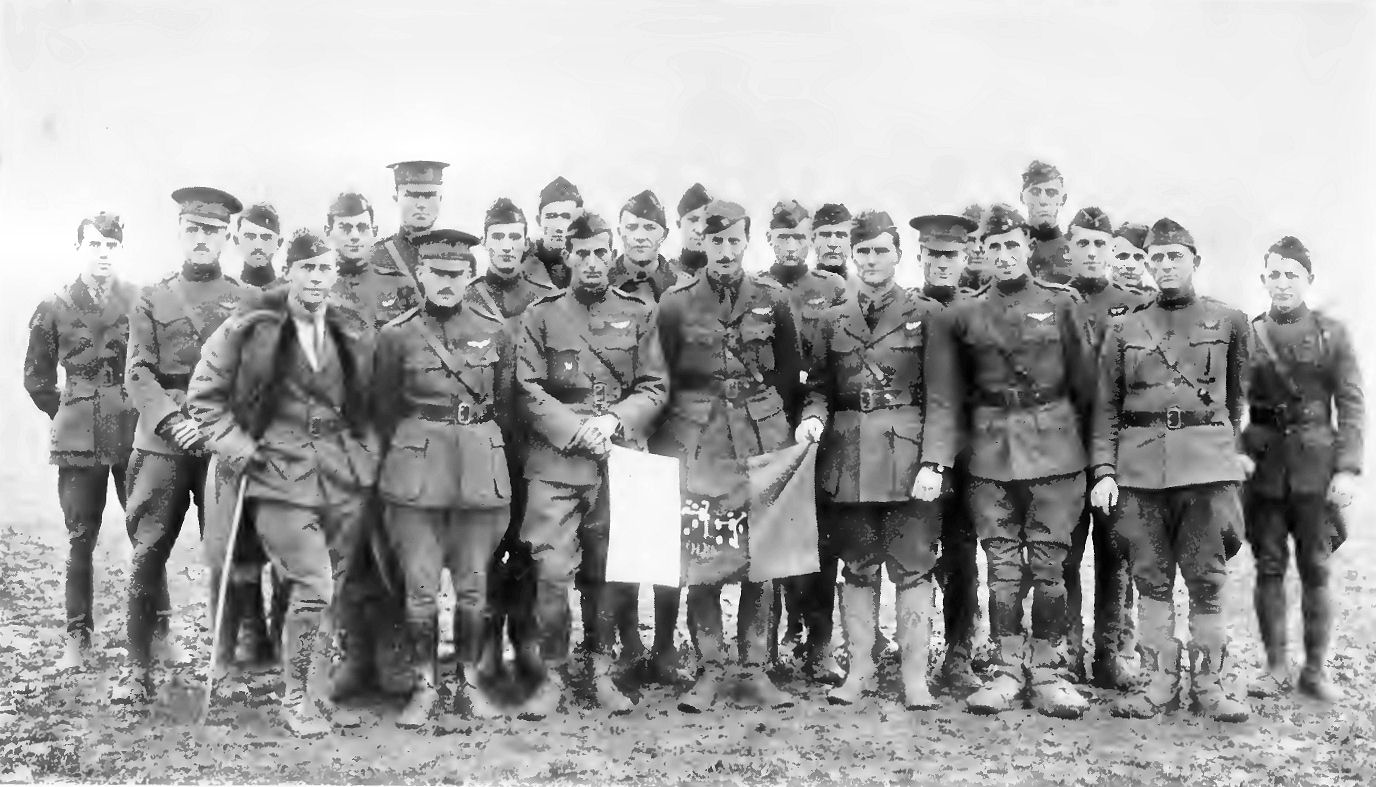
90th Aero Squadron – 11:00am 11 November 1918 Bethelainville Aerodrome, France.

At Colombey, comfortable quarters were assigned and the squadron settled down to await orders to the coast. The squadron left Colombey 25 January 1919, en route for the port of embarkation. It stopped at the village of Saint-Denis-de-Pile, near Libourne, Gironde.

On 3 February after five days spent at St. Denis, the squadron was ordered to Libourne, the next step on the way home. There the men occupied the old stone French barracks, while the officers were billeted at private houses throughout the town. The squadron remained at Libourne until 10 April, when the long-awaited order to proceed to the Embarkation Camp. After two or three disappointments, the men were ordered on board the USS General G. W. Goethals (ID-1443). Officers were detached, and sailed the same day, 20 April, Easter Sunday, on board the USS Susquehanna (ID-3016). The voyage was very uneventful; land was finally sighted at 5 a.m. 3 May, and the squadron docked in Hoboken, New Jersey, at 10 a.m., after a voyage of thirteen days. On 4 May at 8 a.m., the squadron marched over to Field No. 2, Garden City (Mitchell Field), and the work of demobilizing the squadron was begun.

After the war, 90th alumni commissioned Tiffany's of New York to design a silver pin with the squadron logo.

=== Inter-war period ===
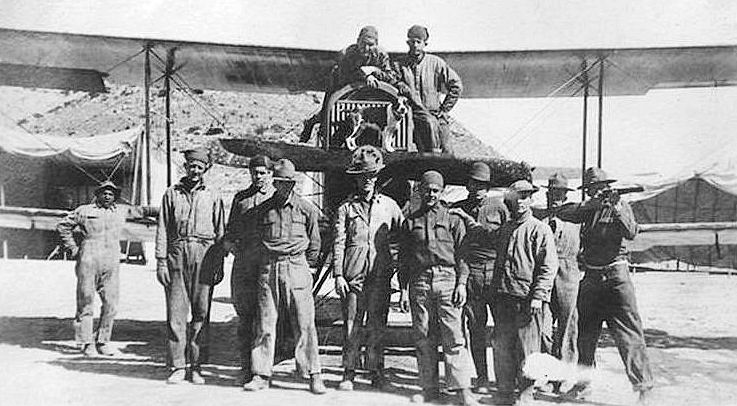
De Havilland DH-4 bomber with members of the 90th Squadron (Surveillance) at Sanderson Field, Texas, ca 1920.

see also: United States Army Border Air Patrol

After returning from France, most of the squadron demobilized at Mitchell Field and returned to civilian life. A small cadre of the unit remained in the Air Service, and were sent back to Kelly Field, Texas. At Kelly, the 90th, along with the 8th, 12th and 13th Aero Squadrons were formed into the Army Surveillance Group on 1 July 1919. The group was redesignated the 3d Attack Group on 2 July 1921.

The mission of the Army Surveillance Group was to carry out observation overflights along the Mexican Border. During this period, Mexico was enduring a period of revolution and unrest, which led to border violations and the deaths of American citizens. From Kelly Field, the squadron was divided into two flights, Flight A operated from Eagle Pass Field, while Flight B operated from Kelly Field. Both flights were equipped with American-built deHavilland DH-4 aircraft, which were designed as bombers during the war.

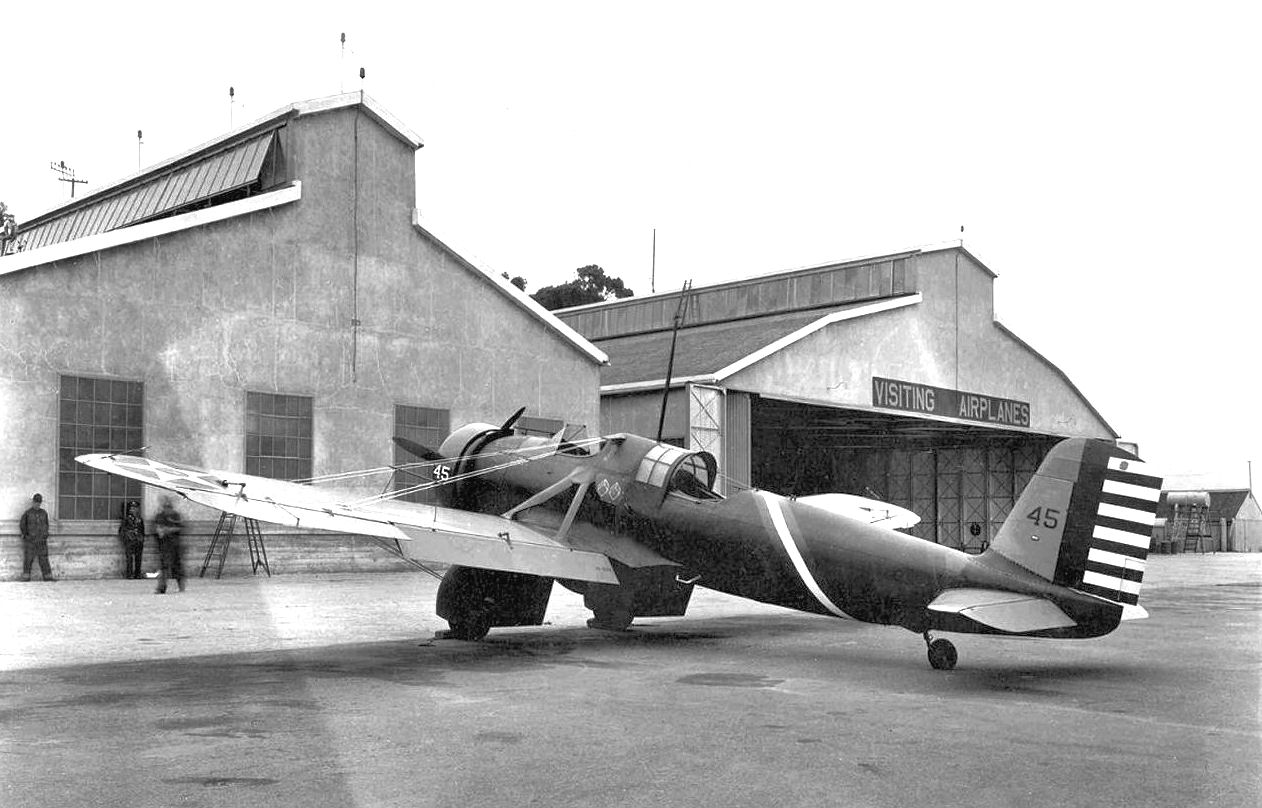
90th Attack Squadron – Curtiss A-12 Shrike, 1933

In the late summer of 1919 the 464th Aero Construction Squadron had been sent to establish an Army airfield at Sanderson, Texas. By November, enough construction had been completed at Sanderson Field that the squadron moved from Kelly to operate from the new airfield, while the detachment at Eagle Pass Field continued operations. The detachment moved from Eagle Pass to Del Rio Field, Texas, on 12 Jun 1920.

As the unrest in Mexico died down by the middle of 1921 the 90th reunited and moved back to Kelly Field in July. At Kelly Field, Brigadier General William 'Billy' Mitchell, a senior staff officer in the Army Air Service, decided to use this low-level flying experience and the World War I experience of the 3d Group's pilots to create a group devoted to low-level mission of supporting ground troops and attacking ground targets.

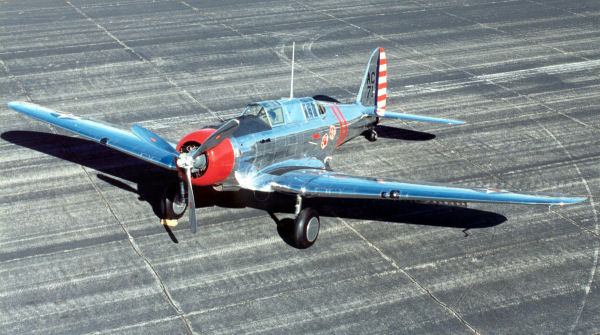
Northrop A-17A Serial 36-207 at the National Museum of the United States Air Force. It was assigned to the 90th Attack Squadron. It is the only A-17A known to exist.

Flew border reconnaissance missions from Fort Huachuca, Arizona, during the Escobar-Topete Revolution 7 April–2 May 1929. The 90th Squadron contributed to the pioneering of new tactics for attack aircraft, delivered US mail in 1934 took part in aerial mapping missions during the 1930s, and attracted significant talent among early military airmen. One example of these early airmen was General James H. Doolittle. On 2 September 1922 General Doolittle, then a first lieutenant, became the first pilot to travel coast-to-coast in under 24 hours. Although he could not remember if he was assigned to the 90th during the flight, the Air Force Historical Research Agency confirmed he was a member of the 90th at the time, and his DH-4 aircraft displayed the 90th's pair-o-dice emblem. Early commanders of the 90th also included Lieutenants Hoyt Vandenberg and Nathan Twining, both of whom later became Air Force Chiefs of Staff. Transferred on 27 February 1935 to Barksdale Field, Louisiana, then transferred on 10 October 1940 to Savannah AAF, Georgia.

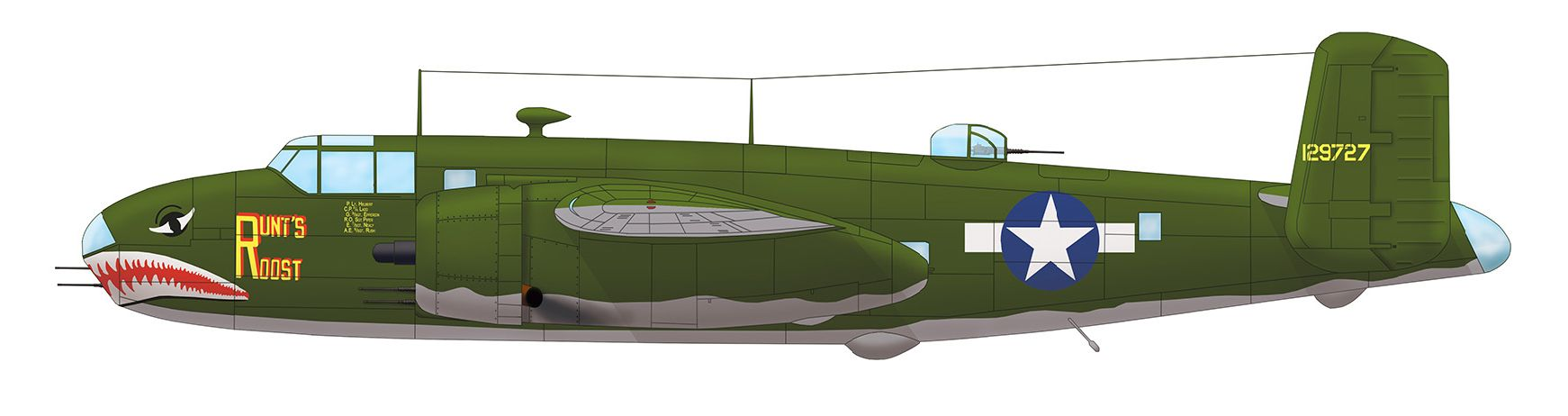
North American B-25C Mitchell of the 90th BS, 3rd BG(L) USAAF, Dobodura Airfield 1943

=== World War II ===
During World War II, the 90th, now a bombardment squadron, operated in the South Pacific, flying Douglas A-20 Havoc and North American B-25 Mitchell aircraft. Their main mission involved highly-dangerous skip bombings. In an effort to improve the effectiveness and protection of the 3d Bombardment Group's pilots, Major Paul 'Pappy' Gunn, 3d Bombardment Group engineering officer, devised a modification of the B-25C. The modification replaced the forward bombardier with four forwards firing .50 caliber machine guns, supplemented with two twin .50 caliber gun packages side mounted on the fuselage. The lower turret was discarded. The A-20s received similar modifications. The modified aircraft were first employed by the 90th and proved exceptionally effective, receiving the nickname 'commerce destroyers.' During the Battle of the Bismarck Sea, every aircraft in the 90th scored a hit on the Japanese convoy of 18 ships. It was the first sea-level attack by B-25 strafers in World War II and demonstrated that this tactic was extremely effective. The squadron also participated in the raids on Wewak, New Guinea, which were preemptive strikes that virtually ended the threat of enemy offensive air capabilities.

=== Cold War ===
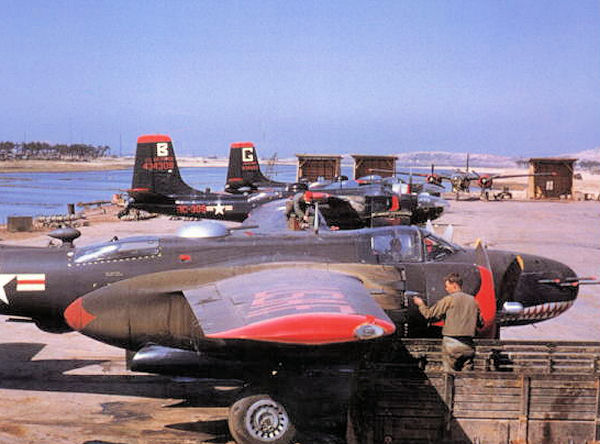
3d Bomb Wing B-26B-50-DL Invaders during the Korean War. Serial 44-34306 identifiable.

In 1945, after World War II, the 90th Squadron was moved to Japan. The 90th began flying the Douglas A-26 Invader as the 3d Bombardment Group became an all A-26 outfit. In September 1946 the 90th moved with the 3d Bombardment Group to Yokota Air Base, Japan, and began training to become combat-ready with the A-26, which was redesignated the B-26 Invader. With the creation of the U.S. Air Force in late 1947 the force began an internal reorganization. This led to the activation of the 3d Bombardment Wing in August 1948, to which the 3d Bombardment Group was assigned. The 90th Squadron was inactivated from 1 October 1949 until 25 June 1951.

At that point, the squadron was redesignated the 90th Bombardment Squadron Light, Night Intruder. In July, as part of the 3d Bombardment Group, the 90th participated in the Korean War. The B-26 Invaders, which the 90th flew, had as many as 12 forward-firing .50 caliber machine guns. The 90th's specialty during the Korean War was destroying locomotives and marshalling yards.

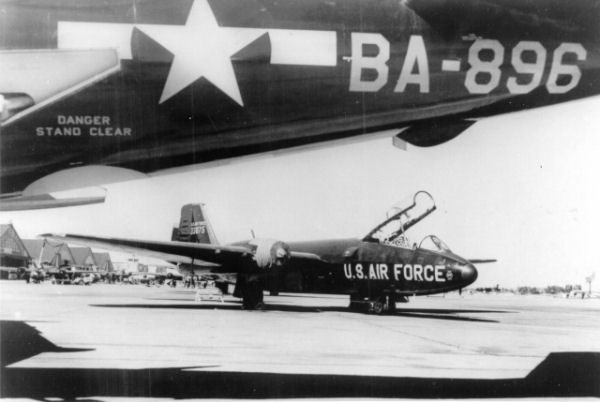
Martin B-57B-MA Serial 53-3896 of the 3d Bomb Wing.

After the war, the 90th moved with the 3d Bombardment Group to Johnson Air Base, Japan, on 1 October 1954. In January 1956 the unit transitioned to the B-57C Night Intruder. In October 1957 the 3d Bombardment Group inactivated and its heritage transferred to the 3d Bombardment Wing, as did the 90th Bombardment Squadron. In 1960 the wing and squadron transferred to Yokota Air Base, where it trained in bombardment, reconnaissance, and air refueling. It also served nuclear alert during this period as well. In the mid-1960s, however, the squadron underwent significant changes.

In 1964 the 3d Bombardment Wing converted to a tactical fighter wing, as did the 90th, which became the 90th Tactical Fighter Squadron on 8 June 1964. The wing and the 90th moved to England Air Force Base, Louisiana, as part of an overall reorganization to reduce the number of wings located in Japan. While at England, the 90th gained the North American F-100 Super Sabre. At the beginning of the Vietnam War, the 3d Bombardment Wing began deploying units to South Vietnam on a rotational basis, while the remainder continued training in their ground support role. In November 1965 the wing moved to Bien Hoa Air Base, South Vietnam, during the buildup of forces. The 90th flew close air support missions from Bien Hoa through tens of thousands of sorties. In 1969 the 90th Tactical Fighter Squadron reverted to its pre-World War II designation of 90th Attack Squadron. On 31 October 1970 the 3d Tactical Fighter Wing ended its duties in Vietnam and remained active in 'paper' status until it moved to Kunsan Air Base, South Korea, in March 1971. The 90th Attack Squadron was reassigned to the 14th Special Operations Wing on 31 October 1970 and was redesignated the 90th Special Operations Squadron and remained in South Vietnam at Nha Trang Air Base.

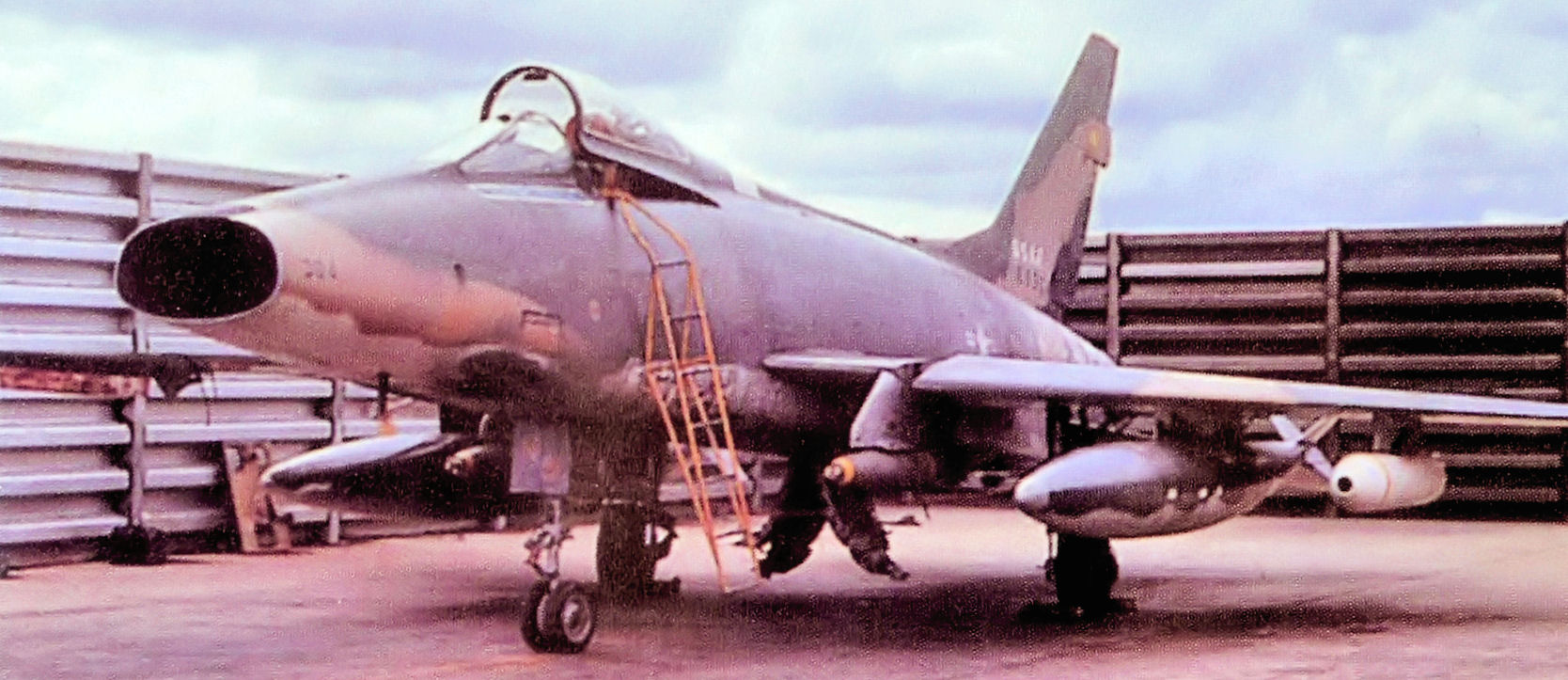
90th TFS North American F-100D-90-NA Super Sabre 56-3304 Bien Hoa Air Base, South Vietnam, 1967

From late 1970 until 1974 the 90th underwent several command reassignments. It remained with the 14th Special Operations Wing until 1 September 1971, when it moved to the 483d Tactical Fighter Wing and remained at Nha Trang Air Base. On 15 April 1972 the 90th moved again, this time to the 18th Tactical Fighter Wing at Kadena Air Base, Okinawa, Japan. This assignment lasted only a few months, as the unit was assigned to the 405th Fighter Wing in December 1972 and moved to Clark Air Base, Philippines. The squadron was redesignated the 90th Tactical Fighter Squadron on 8 July 1973, and began to fly McDonnell F-4 Phantom IIs. In September of the following year, the 90th returned once again to the 3d Tactical Fighter Wing, when it relocated to Clark Air Base after the 405th Fighter Wing was inactivated.

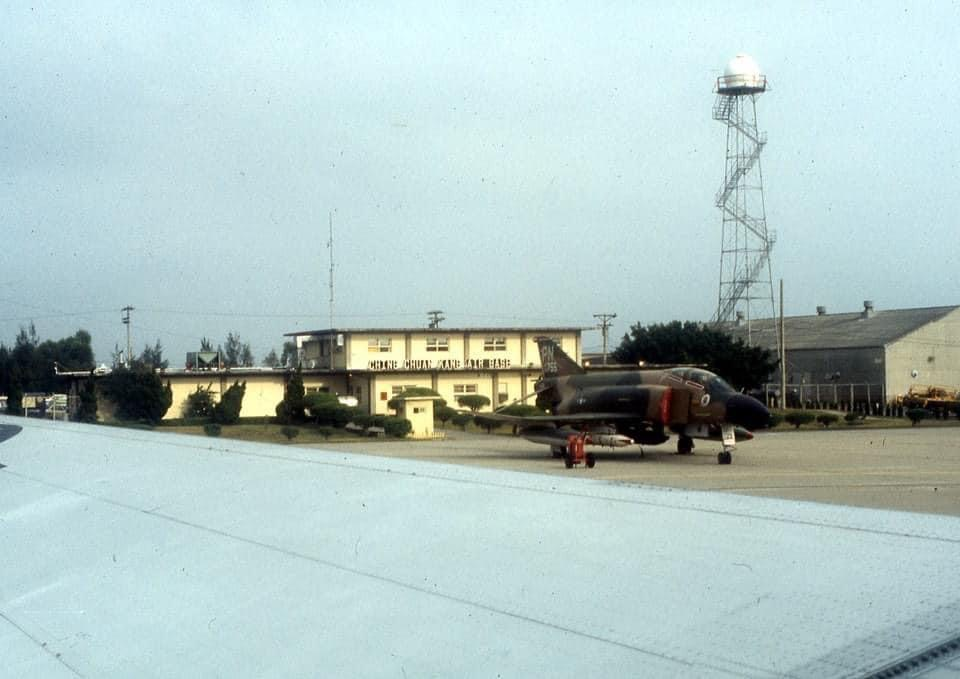
F-4D-28-MC Phantom II 65-0755 of the 90th Tactical Fighter Squadron at Ching Chuan Kang Air Base, Taiwan, 1974

From 31 August 1973 to 31 July 1974 the 90th Tactical Fighter Squadron maintained an F-4 detachment at the Ching Chuan Kang Air Base, Tainan Air Base, Taiwan, and primary mission was to support Taiwan’s air defense. In 1975 the 90th converted to the F-4E and participated in combat training and providing air defense for the Philippines.

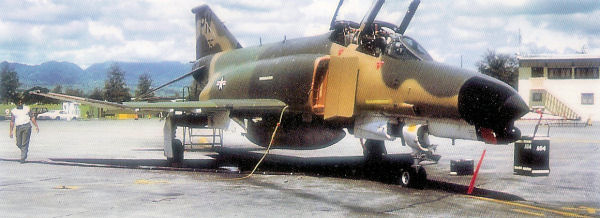
McDonnell Douglas F-4G-42-MC Phantom Serial 69-0275 of the 90th TFS/3d TFW Clark AFB, Philippines, 1979.

In July 1977 the 90th once again upgraded its aircraft, this time to the F-4G, which performed a ground radar suppression and destruction mission. The squadron had both F-4G and F-4E aircraft assigned, operating in "hunter-killer" roles. Each F-4G was paired with an F-4E during each mission, and the G models would point out threat radar sites to the E models for attack, as well as attacking using their own armaments. This multiplied the force being applied without having to purchase more of the expensive G models. During the late 1970s and 1980s, the squadron provided training and support to other units throughout the Pacific, as well as ensuring the readiness of its own pilots and aircraft. The unit participated in numerous Cope Thunder exercises hosted at Clark AB, as well as Pitch Black in Darwin, Australia, and other exercises in South Korea. By 1990, however, the Philippines had expressed a desire for the withdrawal of American military forces in the islands. In May 1991 the 90th Tactical Fighter Squadron was reassigned to the 21st Tactical Fighter Wing located at Elmendorf Air Force Base, Alaska. In September 1991 the 90th was redesignated the 90th Fighter Squadron and became part of the 21st Operations Group. This association did not last long, however.

=== Post-Cold War ===
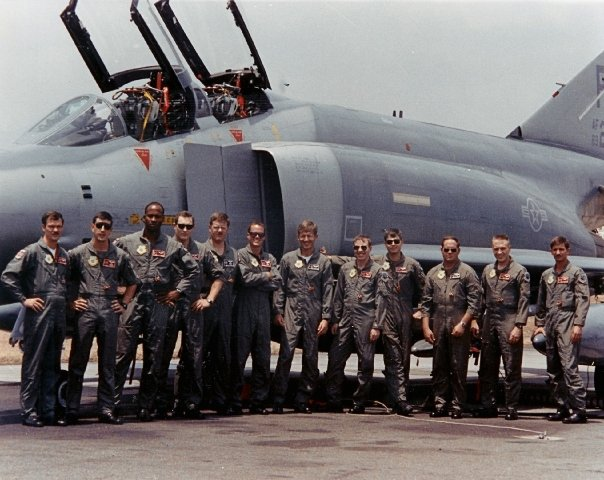
"Philippine Expeditionary Force" back home at Clark AB, RP before Mount Pinatubo eruption.

In June 1991 Mount Pinatubo erupted in the Philippines and the Air Force quickly decided to evacuate its personnel and equipment from Clark AB. The 3d Tactical Fighter Wing remained in the Philippines during Desert Shield and Desert Storm due to instability in the Philippines. However, it was not going to remain in the islands for very long. It became a 'paper' unit briefly while the Chief of Staff, General Merrill McPeak, decided where to send the wing. He selected Elmendorf. The 21st Tactical Fighter Wing was inactivated and the 3d Wing replaced it as the lead wing at Elmendorf on 19 December 1991. With the establishment of the 3d Wing on Elmendorf, the 90th Fighter Squadron was once again reunited with its old wing.

While these changes occurred with the 3d Wing, the 90th Fighter Squadron deployed six F-4G crews to join other Wild Weasel squadrons and coalition forces in Sheikh Isa, Bahrain for the Gulf War. The six crews were attached to the 81st Tactical Fighter Squadron and were known as the Philippine Expeditionary Force (PEF). During combat operations, PEF crews destroyed multiple Iraqi SAM sites. This was the last combat deployment for the 90th while operating F-4Gs. Upon relocating to Elmendorf, the unit gained a new aircraft, the McDonnell Douglas F-15E Strike Eagle. This two-seat dual role updated version of the F-15C Eagle had more survivability enhancements than any other fighter aircraft at the time. It carried a wide array of armament as it performed both air-to-air and air-to-surface attack missions.

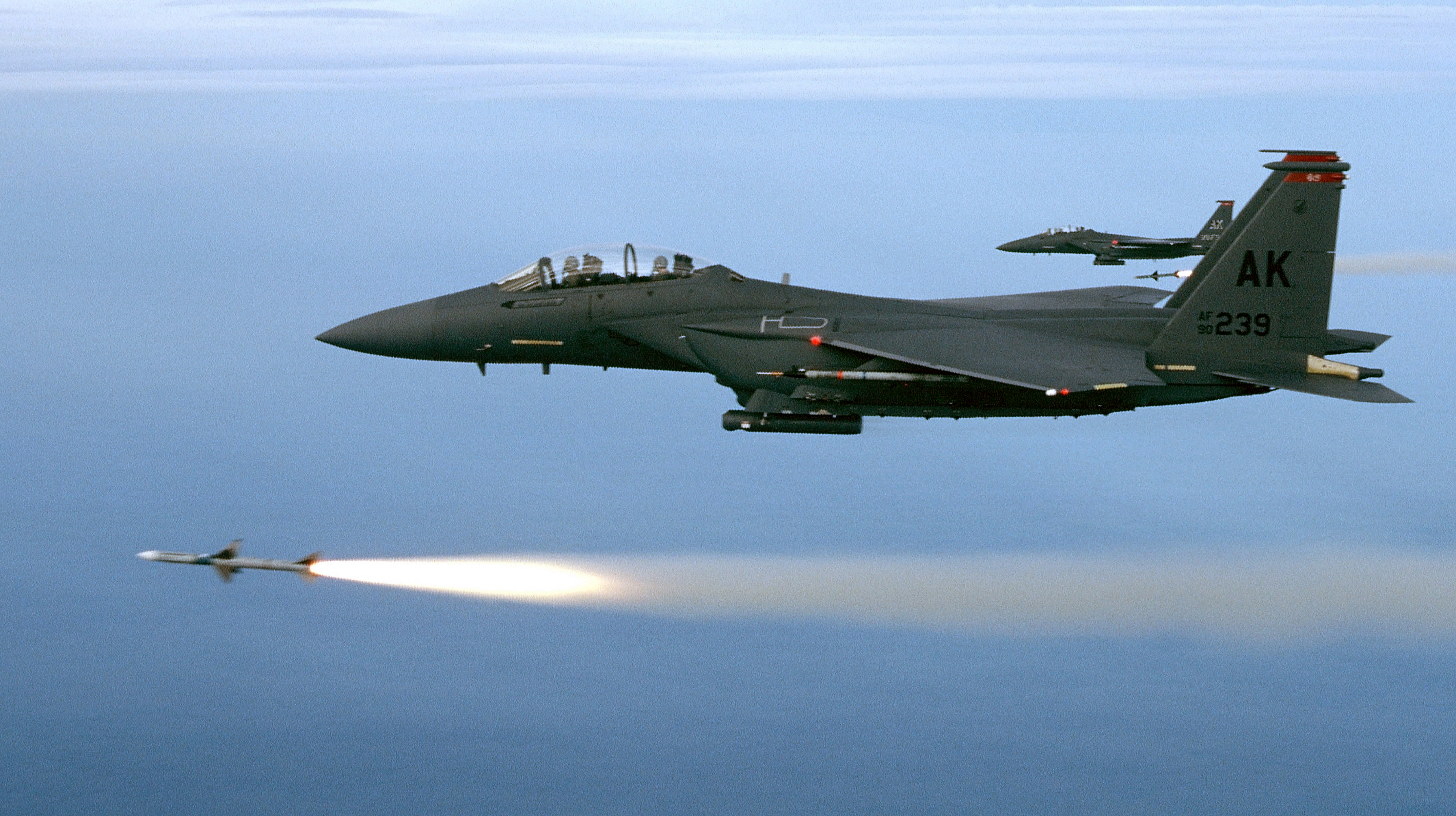
90th FS F-15E Strike Eagles firing AIM-7M missiles during a training mission over the Gulf of Mexico, 2002

Since arriving in Alaska, the 90th Fighter Squadron participated in numerous training exercises in the lower 48 states and other areas of the world. These training exercises included Polar Thrust, Cope Thunder, Tandem Thrust, Cope Thaw, and Red Flag in locations such as Mountain Home Air Force Base, Idaho, Osan Air Base, Korea, Andersen Air Force Base, Guam, Naval Air Station Fallon, Nevada, and Nellis Air Force Base, Nevada. The squadron also developed a reputation for safety in its training. On 20 February 1996 the squadron received the Alaska Governor's Safety Award conferred through the Alaska Department of Labor. This was the first time a military organization won the state award since its inception in 1980.

In addition to exercises, the 90th Fighter Squadron also undertook real-world deployments during the 1990s and early 2000s (decade). From October 1995 until January 1996 the squadron deployed 8 F-15Es and 193 personnel to Aviano Air Base, Italy in support of Operation Deny Flight and Operation Joint Endeavor. In February 1998 the squadron deployed 18 F-15Es and over 200 personnel to Kwangju Air Base and Taegu Air Base, both in Korea. While there, the unit flew 1200 joint combat training sorties. Personnel and aircraft redeployed in June 1998.

In 2001 the 90th began a series of deployments which took members of the squadron to the Middle East and Southwest Asia. In March of that year, the 90th participated in a 90-day deployment in support of Operation Northern Watch, patrolling the northern No-fly zone in Iraq. The squadron sent 154 personnel and 10 F-15Es to Incirlik Air Base, Turkey and returned to Elmendorf on 9 June 2001. In October that year, 18 F-15Es were deployed to Kwangju Air Base, Korea, in support of Afghanistan operations. While deployed pilots flew practice strike missions and provided long-range interdiction strike capability in the region during the absence of the USS Kitty Hawk (CV-63), they also flew missions over South Korea and repaired base infrastructure while there. The squadron redeployed from 20 to 23 December.

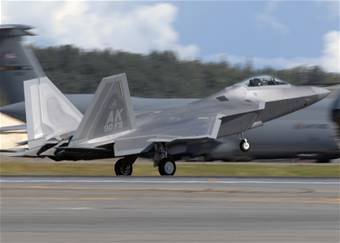
The first of 40 F-22A Raptors at Elmendorf. The aircraft is flown and maintained by the active-duty Air Force's 90th Fighter Squadron and Air Force Reserve 302d Fighter Squadron.

The 90th Fighter Squadron participated in an historic event on 4 September 2002. Two Royal Australian Air Force exchange officers, Flight Lieutenant Paul Simmons and Flight Lieutenant Tony Southwood, paired up to fly one of the 90th's F-15Es. This was the first time Australian pilots flew an American aircraft in the Pacific Theatre.

In 2003 the squadron undertook another deployment in the Pacific in support of Operation Enduring Freedom. The 90th sent 18 F-15Es to bases in the Pacific, including Osan Air Base, Kunsan Air Base, (both in Korea), Kadena Air Base, Japan and Andersen Air Force Base, Guam. The deployment included 592 personnel from mid-February until mid-May.

Kwangju AB, Korea, once again became home to members of the 90th Fighter Squadron in 2004. In August the squadron deployed 12 F-15Es in a rotation. The unit was temporarily designated the 90th Expeditionary Fighter Squadron and assigned to the 3d Air Expeditionary Group. While deployed the unit flew more than 1100 sorties over the Korean Peninsula and provided two important flights to distinguished visitors, Republic of Korea Air Force Brigadier General Ko and Republic of Korea General Kim, Commander Korean Ground Forces.

In 2005 the squadron focused on training and preparation for its next real-world deployment. Amidst the training and exercises, however, the squadron was able to showcase their talent with participation in the Aero India Airshow and with a flyby at the United States Air Force Academy before the Air Force-Army football game. Additionally, the F-15Es completed an upgrade of their weapons systems. This upgrade allowed the aircraft to carry and use more advanced weaponry, including the Joint Direct Attack Munition and eventually the Small Diameter Bomb.

As 2006 progressed, the 90th Fighter Squadron began to prepare for significant changes in its mission and weapons system. The F-15Es were scheduled to relocate to Mountain Home Air Force Base, Idaho, through the BRAC decisions in 2005. Replacing those F-15Es, the 90th began receiving the advanced F-22 Raptor in August 2007, which greatly enhanced the 90th Fighter Squadron's ability to perform its duties.

In August 2022 twelve of the squadron's F-22 Raptors deployed to Łask Air Base, Poland as part of NATO's air shielding mission.

In August 2024 some of squadron's F-22 Raptors jets have arrived in the Middle East in a show of force meant to deter Iran and its proxies from attacking Israel following the assassination of a Hamas leader.

== Lineage ==
- Organized as the 90th Aero Squadron on 20 August 1917

Redesignated 90th Aero Squadron (Corps Observation) on 19 April 1918
Redesignated 90th Aero Squadron in May 1919
Redesignated 90th Squadron (Surveillance) on 13 August 1919
Redesignated 90th Squadron (Attack) on 15 September 1921
Redesignated 90th Attack Squadron on 25 January 1923
Redesignated 90th Bombardment Squadron (Light) on 15 September 1939
Redesignated 90th Bombardment Squadron (Dive) on 28 September 1942
Redesignated 90th Bombardment Squadron (Light) on 25 May 1943
Redesignated 90th Bombardment Squadron, Light on 29 April 1944
Inactivated on 1 Oct 1949

- Redesignated as: 90th Bombardment Squadron, Light, Night Intruder on 7 June 1951

Activated on 25 Jun 1951
Redesignated 90th Bombardment Squadron, Tactical on 1 October 1955
Redesignated 90th Tactical Fighter Squadron on 8 June 1964
Redesignated 90th Attack Squadron on 12 December 1969
Redesignated 90th Special Operations Squadron on 31 October 1970
Redesignated 90th Tactical Fighter Squadron on 8 July 1973
Redesignated 90th Fighter Squadron on 26 September 1991

=== Assignments ===
- Post Headquarters, Kelly Field, 20 August 1917
- Aviation Concentration Center, 5–26 October 1917
- American Expeditionary Forces, 12 November 1917
- 1st Air Depot, American Expeditionary Forces, c. 20 November 1917
- I Corps Observation Group, 19 April 1918
- IV Corps Observation Group, 13 June 1918
- III Corps Observation Group, 21 September 1918
- I Corps Observation Group, 30 November 1918
- American Expeditionary Forces, December 1918 – 19 April 1919
- Post Headquarters, Hazelhurst Field, 5 May 1919
- Post Headquarters, Kelly Field, May 1919
- Army Surveillance Group (later 1st Surveillance Group, 3d Group (Attack), 3d Attack Group, 3d Bombardment Group), 1 July 1919 – 1 October 1949
- 3d Bombardment Group, 25 June 1951 )attached to 3d Bombardment Wing after 13 August 1956)

3d Bombardment Wing, 25 October 1957 (attached to 41st Air Division after 1 September 1963)

- 41st Air Division, 8 January 1964
- Tactical Air Command, 8 June 1964
- 3d Tactical Fighter Wing, 9 June 1964 (attached to 405th Fighter Wing, 7 February–10 May 1965, 39th Air Division after 8 August 1965)
- 834th Air Division, 19 November 1965 (remained attached to 39th Air Division Until 5 December 1965, then to 401st Tactical Fighter Wing)
- 3d Tactical Fighter Wing, c. 8 February 1966
- 14th Special Operations Wing, 31 October 1970
- 483d Tactical Airlift Wing, 1 September 1971
- 18th Tactical Fighter Wing, 15 April 1972
- 405th Fighter Wing, 15 December 1972
- 3d Tactical Fighter Wing, 16 September 1974
- 21st Tactical Fighter Wing, 29 May 1991
- 21st Operations Group, 26 September 1991
- 3d Operations Group, 19 December 1991 – present

=== Stations ===
World War I

- Kelly Field, Texas, 20 August 1917
- Camp Mills, Garden City, New York, 5–27 October 1917
- Colombey-les-Belles Airdrome, France, 20 November 1917
- Amanty Airdrome, France, 19 April 1918
- Ourches Aerodrome, France, 13 June 1918
- Souilly Aerodrome, France, 20 September 1918
- Bethelainville Aerodrome, France, 29 October 1918
- Belrain Aerodrome, France, 15 January 1919
- Colombey-les-Belles Airdrome, France, 18 January 1919
- Libourne, France, 25 January 1919
- St. Denis-de-Piles, France, 29 January 1919
- Libourne, France, 2 February 1919
- Bordeaux, France, 10–19 April 1919

Inter-War period

- Hazelhurst Field, New York, 5 May 1919
- Kelly Field, Texas, c. May 1919

Flight A operated from: Eagle Pass Field, Texas, 27 August 1919 – 12 June 1920
Flight B operated from: Kelly Field No. 2, Texas, 30 September–29 November 1919

- Sanderson Field, Texas, 29 November 1919

Flight A operated from: Del Rio Field, Texas, 12 June 1920 – 30 June 1921

- Kelly Field, Texas, 2 July 1921
- Fort Crockett, Texas, 1 July 1926

Detachment operated from Fort Huachuca, Arizona, 7 April–12 May 1929

- Barksdale Field, Louisiana, 27 February 1935 (deployed to Bakersfield, California, 3–23 May 1937)

- Army Air Base Savannah, Georgia, 9 Oct 1940 – 19 January 1942
- Archerfield Airport, Brisbane, Australia, 25 February 1942
- Breddan Airfield, Charters Towers, Australia, 8 March 1942
- Port Moresby Airfield Complex, New Guinea, 28 January 1943
- Dobodura Airfield Complex, New Guinea, 21 May 1943
- Nadzab Airfield Complex, New Guinea, 5 February 1944
- Hollandia Airfield Complex, New Guinea, c. 7 May 1944
- Dulag Airfield, Leyte, 16 November 1944
- McGuire Field, San Jose, Mindoro, 30 December 1944
- Sobe Airfield, Okinawa, 6 August 1945
- Atsugi Airfield, Japan, c. 8 September 1945
- Yokota Air Base, Japan, 10 October 1946 – 1 October 1949

United States Air Force

- Iwakuni Air Base, Japan, 25 June 1951
- Kunsan Air Base, South Korea, c. 20 August 1951

Deployed at Pusan Air Base (K-9), South Korea, 25 April–17 May 1952

- Johnson Air Base, Japan, 5 October 1954

Deployed at Itazuke Air Base, Japan, 18 January-2 February 1957

- Yokota Air Base, Japan, 18 November 1960 – 9 June 1964
- England Air Force Base, Louisiana, 9 June 1964 – 8 February 1966

Deployed at Clark Air Base, Philippines, 7 February–10 May 1965

- Misawa Air Base, Japan, 3 August–5 December 1965
- Bien Hoa Air Base, South Vietnam, 12 February 1966

Deployed at Phan Rang Air Base, South Vietnam, 9–14 April 1967

- Nha Trang Air Base, South Vietnam, 31 October 1970
- Kadena Air Base, Okinawa (later, Japan), 15 April 1972
- Clark Air Base, Philippines, 15 December 1972

Deployed a Detachment at Tainan Air Base, Taiwan, 31 August 1973 – 31 July 1974

- Elmendorf Air Force Base (later part of Joint Base Elmendorf-Richardson), Alaska, 29 May 1991 – present

=== Aircraft ===
- Sopwith 1½ Strutter, 1918
- Salmson 2A2, 1918–1919
- SPAD S.XI, 1918–1919
- Breguet 14 A.2, 1918–1919
- de Havilland DH-4 (1919–c. 1925, 1926–1932)
- GA-1 (1921–1922)
- O-2 (1921–1928)
- A-3 Falcon (1928–1934)
- O-1 (1920s – early 1930s)
- XO-6 (1920s – early 1930s)
- A-8 Shrike (1920s – early 1930s)
- Y-8 (1920s - early 1930s)
- A-12 Shrike (1933–1936)
- A-17 Nomad (1936–1939)
- A-18 Shrike (1939–1941)
- B-18 Bolo (1939–1941)
- B-12 (1939–1940)
- A-20 Havoc (1941, 1943–1945)
- A-24 Banshee (1941, 1942)
- B-25 Mitchell (1942–1944, 1945)
- A-26 Invader (1945–1949, 1951–1956)
- B-24 Liberator (1944–1946)
- B-57 Canberra (1956–1964)
- F-100 Super Sabre (1964–1969)
- A-37 Dragonfly (1969–1970)
- C-123 Provider (1970–1972)
- C-130 Hercules (1970–1972)
- F-4 Phantom II (1973–1991)
- F-15E Strike Eagle (1994–2007)
- F-22 Raptor (2007 – present)

=== Operations ===
- World War I
- World War II
- Korean War
- Vietnam War
- Operation Deny Flight
- Operation Joint Endeavor
- Operation Northern Watch
- Operation Inherent Resolve

== See also ==
- List of American Aero Squadrons
