= Radar Base, Texas =

- CDP
- Coordinates: 28°51′28″N 100°31′38″W
- Country: United States
- State: Texas
- County: Maverick

Area
  - Total: 4.2 sq mi (10.9 km^{2})
  - Land: 4.2 sq mi (10.9 km^{2})
  - Water: 0 sq mi (0.0 km^{2})
- Elevation: 860 ft (260 m)

Population (2020)
  - Total: 93
- Time zone: UTC-6 (Central (CST))
  - Summer (DST): UTC-5 (CDT)
- FIPS code: 48-60278
- GNIS feature ID: 1852752

Radar Base is a census-designated place (CDP) in Maverick County, Texas, United States. The population was 93 at the 2020 census.

== Geography ==
Radar Base is located at 28°51′28″N 100°31′38″W (28.857903, -100.527332).

According to the United States Census Bureau, the CDP has a total area of 4.2 square miles (11 km^{2}), all land.

It is the location of the Maverick County Memorial International Airport, which was previously Eagle Pass Army Airfield.

== Demographics ==
Historical population
Census	Pop.	Note	%±
2000	162		—
2010	762		370.4%
2020	93		−87.8%
U.S. Decennial Census; 1850–1900 1910; 1920 1930 1940; 1950 1960 1970; 1980 1990 2000; 2010 2020

Radar Base first appeared as a census designated place in the 2000 U.S. census.

The population increased in the 2010 census due to the opening of the Maverick County Detention Center; and then decreased prior to the 2020 Census due to the facility's closure in 2015. The facility was purchased by the GEO Group in 2017 and reopened after the 2020 Census.

=== 2020 census ===
Radar Base CDP, Texas – Racial and ethnic composition Note: the US Census treats Hispanic/Latino as an ethnic category. This table excludes Latinos from the racial categories and assigns them to a separate category. Hispanics/Latinos may be of any race.
Race / Ethnicity (NH = Non-Hispanic)	Pop 2000	Pop 2010	Pop 2020	% 2000	% 2010	% 2020
White alone (NH)	15	18	5	9.26%	2.36%	5.38%
Black or African American alone (NH)	0	1	0	0.00%	0.13%	0.00%
Native American or Alaska Native alone (NH)	3	0	1	1.85%	0.00%	1.08%
Asian alone (NH)	0	12	0	0.00%	1.57%	0.00%
Native Hawaiian or Pacific Islander alone (NH)	0	0	0	0.00%	0.00%	0.00%
Other Race alone (NH)	0	0	0	0.00%	0.00%	0.00%
Mixed race or Multiracial (NH)	0	1	1	0.00%	0.13%	1.08%
Hispanic or Latino (any race)	144	730	86	88.89%	95.80%	92.47%
Total	162	762	93	100.00%	100.00%	100.00%

As of the census of 2000, there were 162 people, 51 households, and 37 families residing in the CDP. The population density was 38.4 inhabitants per square mile (14.8/km^{2}). There were 64 housing units at an average density of 15.2/sq mi (5.9/km^{2}). The racial makeup of the CDP was 78.40% White, 1.85% Native American, 18.52% from other races, and 1.23% from two or more races. Hispanic or Latino of any race were 88.89% of the population.

There were 51 households, out of which 49.0% had children under the age of 18 living with them, 54.9% were married couples living together, 11.8% had a female householder with no husband present, and 25.5% were non-families. 23.5% of all households were made up of individuals, and 7.8% had someone living alone who was 65 years of age or older. The average household size was 3.18 and the average family size was 3.84.

In the CDP, the population was spread out, with 32.1% under the age of 18, 8.0% from 18 to 24, 21.0% from 25 to 44, 27.8% from 45 to 64, and 11.1% who were 65 years of age or older. The median age was 36 years. For every 100 females, there were 92.9 males. For every 100 females age 18 and over, there were 96.4 males.

The median income for a household in the CDP was $19,531, and the median income for a family was $19,531. Males had a median income of $26,250 versus $0 for females. The per capita income for the CDP was $5,983. About 42.9% of families and 42.9% of the population were below the poverty line, including 56.5% of those under the age of eighteen and none of those 65 or over.

== Education ==
Radar Base is served by the Eagle Pass Independent School District.
