= Eagle Pass Army Airfield =

World War II US military installation

Eagle Pass Army Airfield Laughlin AF Aux #1 Eagle Pass Air Force Station
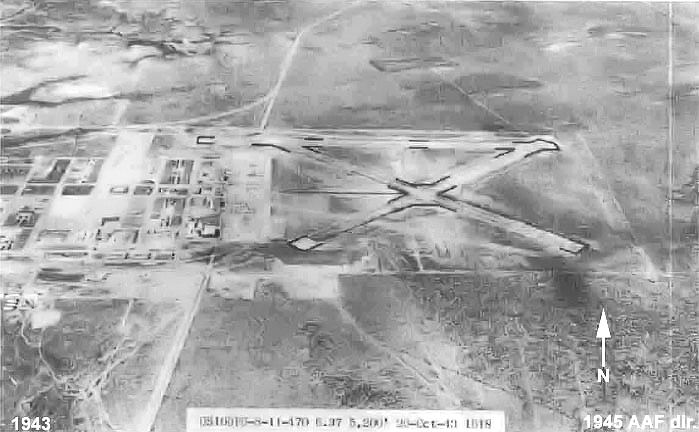
- Eagle Pass Army Airfield - Texas, 28 October 1943
- IATA: none; ICAO: none

Summary
- Built: 1942
- In use: 1942–1945; 1962–1991
- Coordinates: 28°51′35″N 100°31′00″W

Map
- Eagle Pass Army Airfield, Texas

Runways
Direction	Length		Surface
Direction	ft	m	Surface
05/23	5,500	1,676	Bituminous
09/27	5,500	1,676	Bituminous
14/32	5,500	1,676	Bituminous
- Runway information from: Military Airfields in WW2, Texas

Eagle Pass Army Airfield is a former World War II military airfield complex. It is located 10.6 miles (17.1 km) north of Eagle Pass, Texas. It operated as a training base for the United States Army Air Forces from 1943 until 1945.

Later, during the Cold War, Eagle Pass Air Force Station (ADC ID: TM-188) was a United States Air Force Radar facility. It was operated by Air Defense Command on the site of the World War II air base. Opened in 1957, it was closed in 1963.

The facility was finally closed in 1991 when the United States Air Force ended its use of the airfield, having designated the field as Laughlin Air Force Auxiliary Landing Field #1 in 1962, using it as part of the pilot training school at Laughlin AFB.

== History ==
1943 Class book for advanced pilot classes at the Eagle Pass Army Air Field

=== World War II ===
The airport was activated on 30 June 1942 as Eagle Pass Army Air Field as part of the Army Air Forces Training Command. It was assigned to the Central Flying Training Command (CFTC), being under the jurisdiction of the 57th Basic Flying Training Group, 33d Flying Training Wing (Advanced, Single-Engine).

The airfield consisted of three 5,500-foot concrete runways. During the summer of 1942, three runways were laid down along with a large parking ramp and taxiway system. Four large hangars along with support buildings, barracks a street network, electric, sewer and water lines were constructed.

In addition, Eagle Pass controlled three auxiliary fields.

- Cueves Field Aux #1 29°01′42″N 100°32′05″W
- Pinto Field Aux #2 29°11′58″N 100°19′50″W
- Eagle Pass Aux #3 28°41′23″N 100°20′56″W

The mission of Eagle Pass AAF was advanced flying training in single-engine trainers. Its principal trainer aircraft was the North American T-6 Texan. It was a third phase training base, its flying cadets having successfully completed primary and basic flight training. Upon graduation, the flying cadets were commissioned as Second Lieutenants and assigned to one of the numbered air forces for assignment to an operational unit.

The 57th Basic Flying Training Group consisted of the following subordinate units:

- 367th Base Headquarters and Air Base Squadron
- 1046th Guard Squadron
- 354th Aviation Squadron (Separate)
- 826th Flying Training Squadron (Single Engine)
- 827th Flying Training Squadron (Single Engine)

On 1 March 1944, aircraft training units in the United States were re-organized and the 57th was inactivated, being taken over by the 2516th Army Air Force Base Unit.

On 23 November 1944, the training at the base was changed to a phase one basic flying school, providing flight training to cadets with little or no previous flying training.

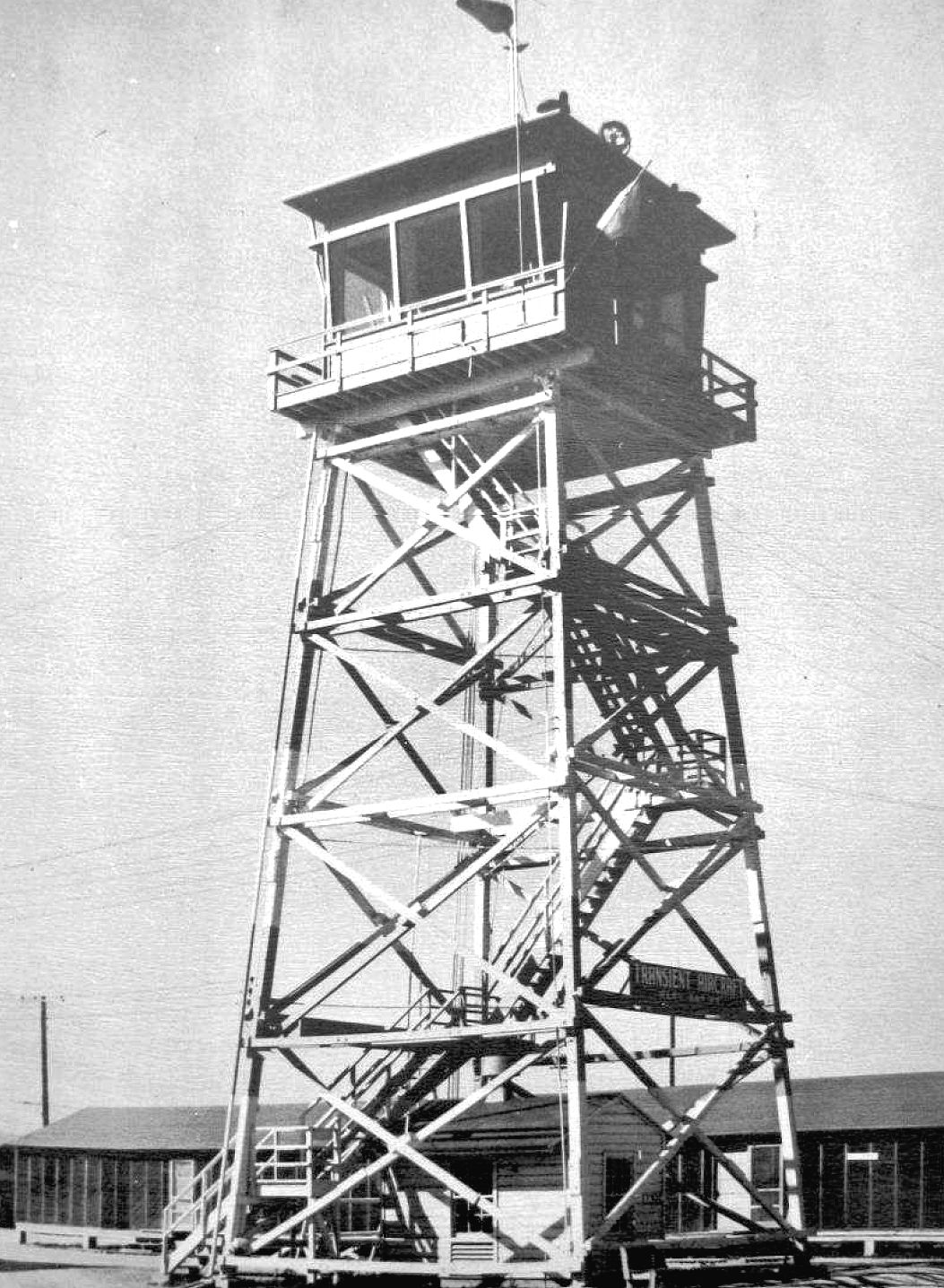
Airfield control tower

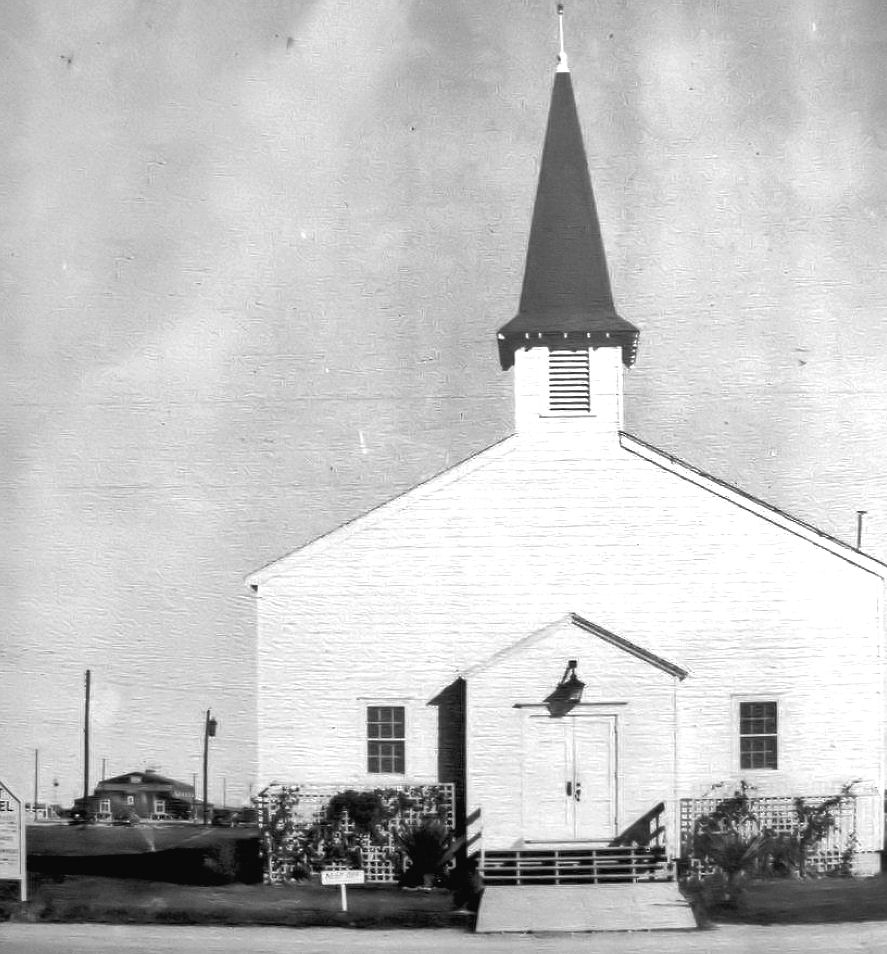
Base Chapel

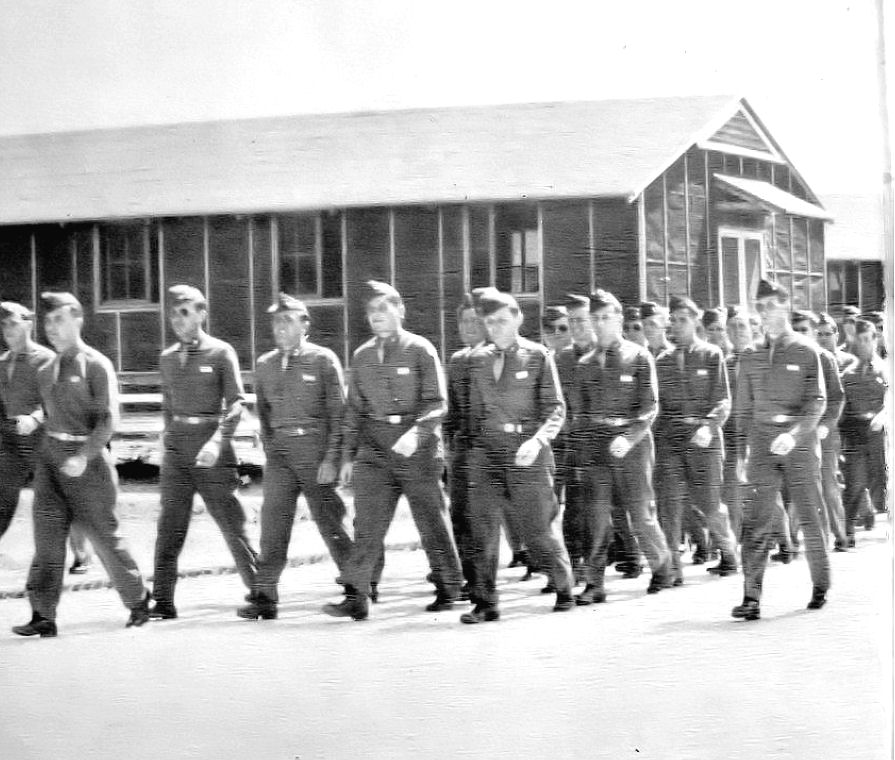
Flight Cadets marching to a ground class.

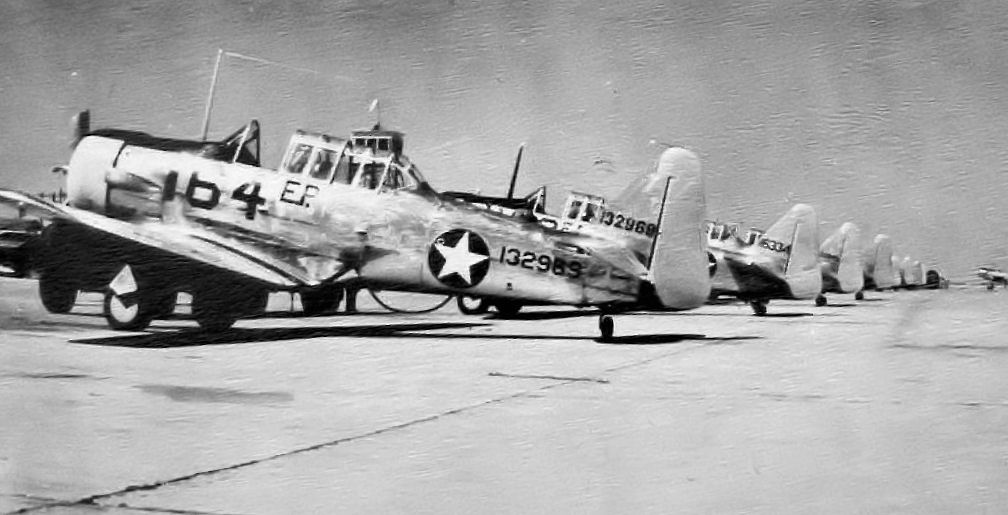
North American AT-6C Texan trainers on flight line.

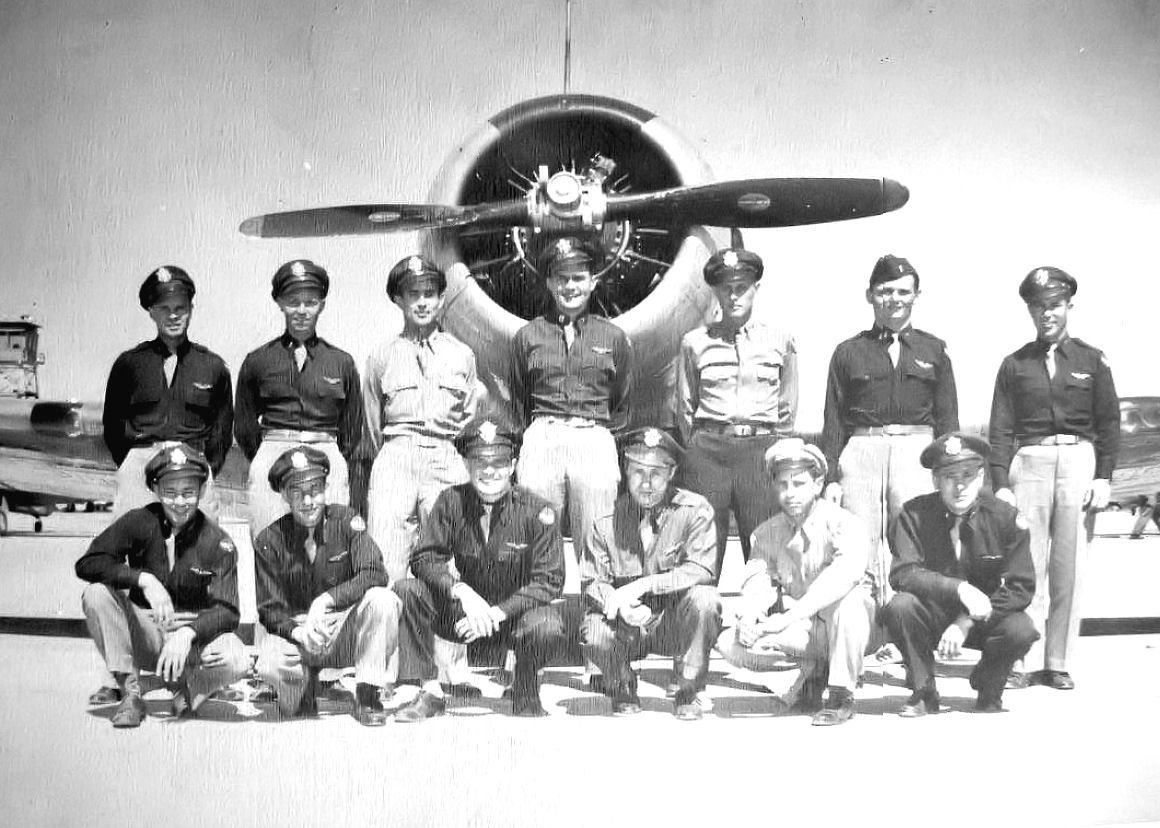
Flight Instructors

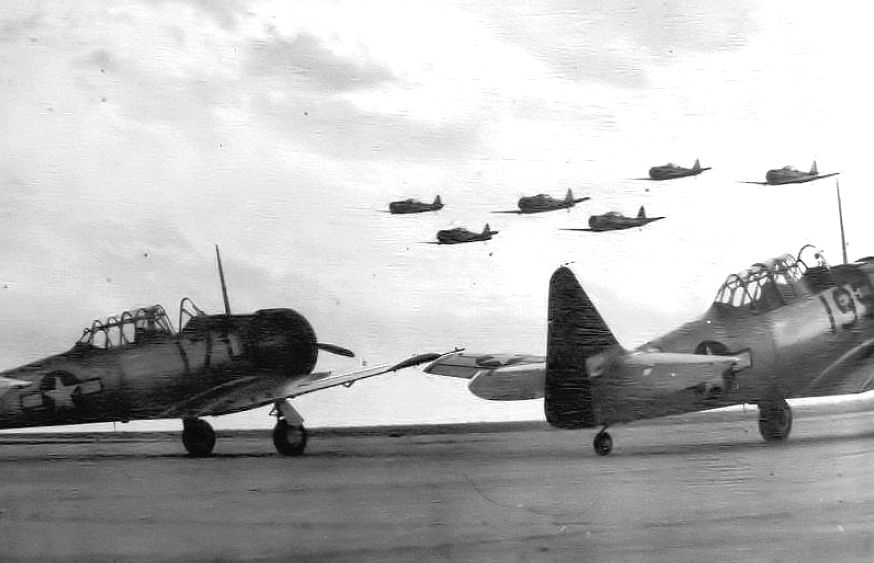
Taking off, formation flying

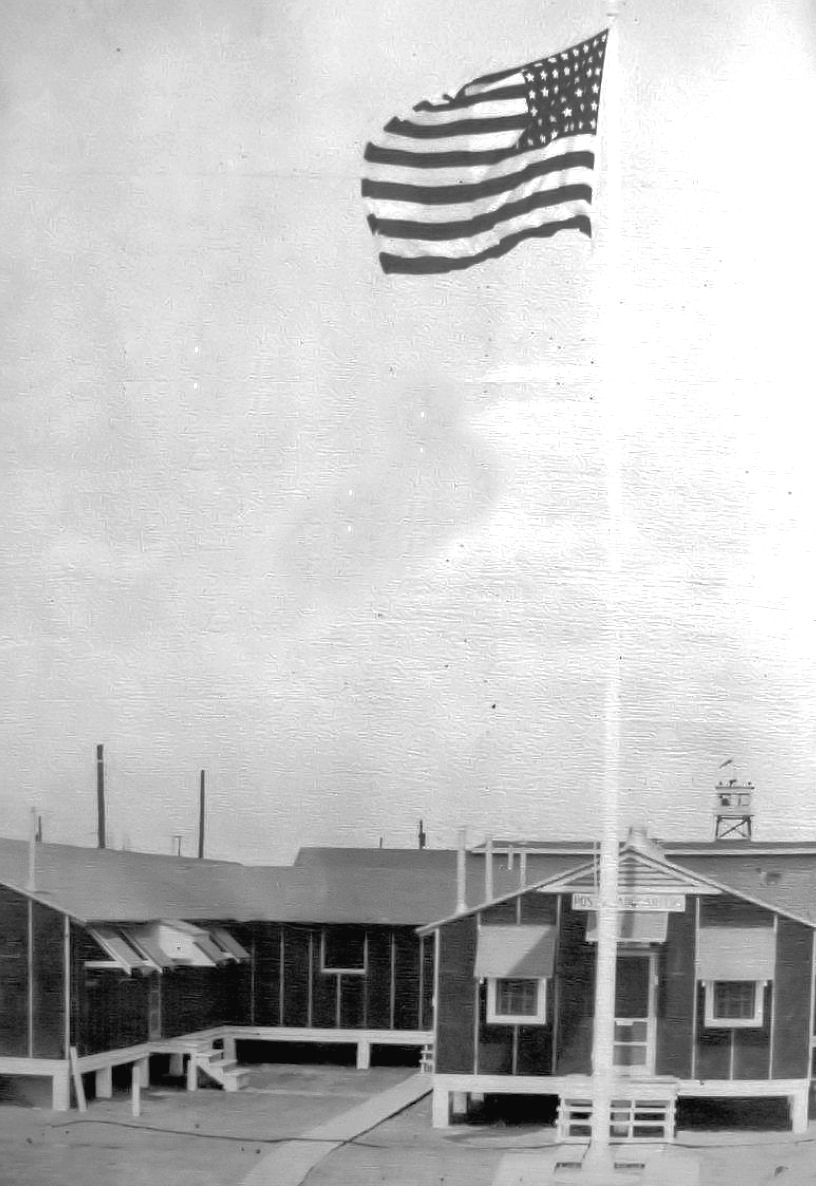
Base Headquarters building

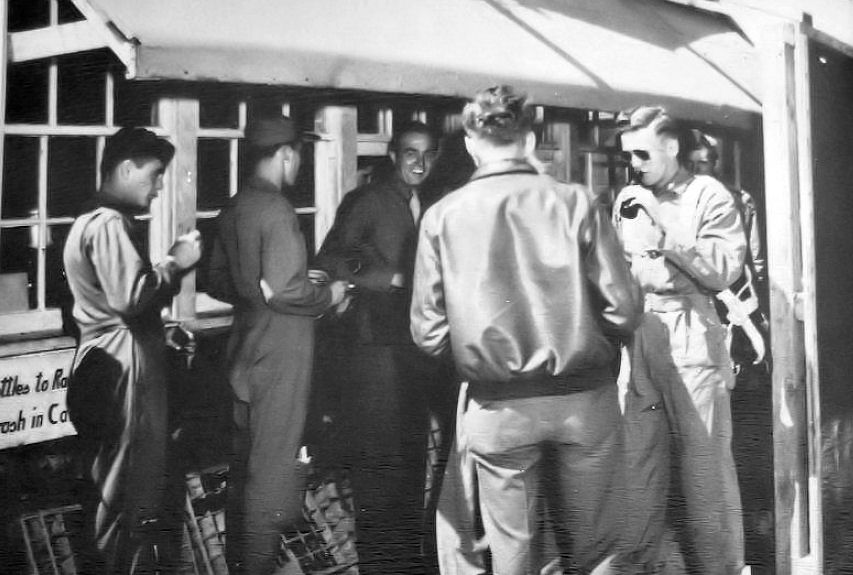
After flight break with flight instructor

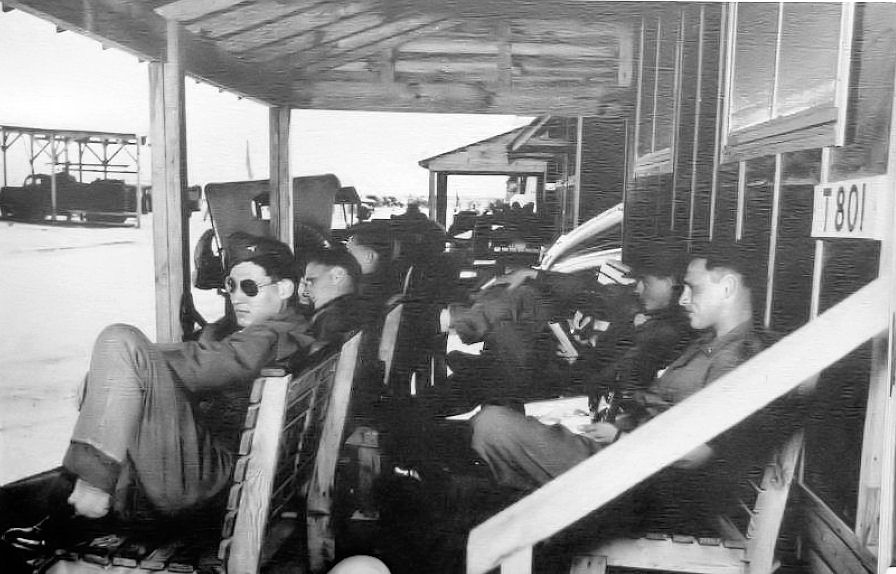
Awaiting training flight

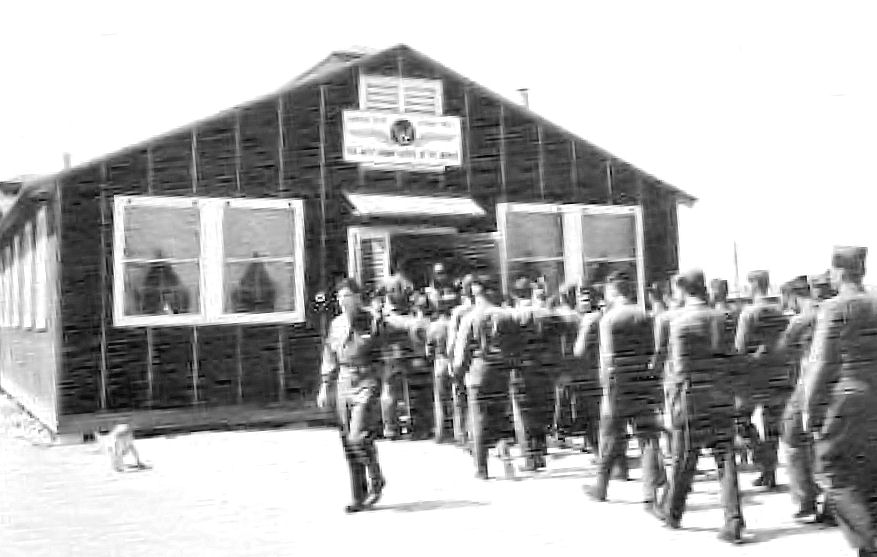
Chow Line

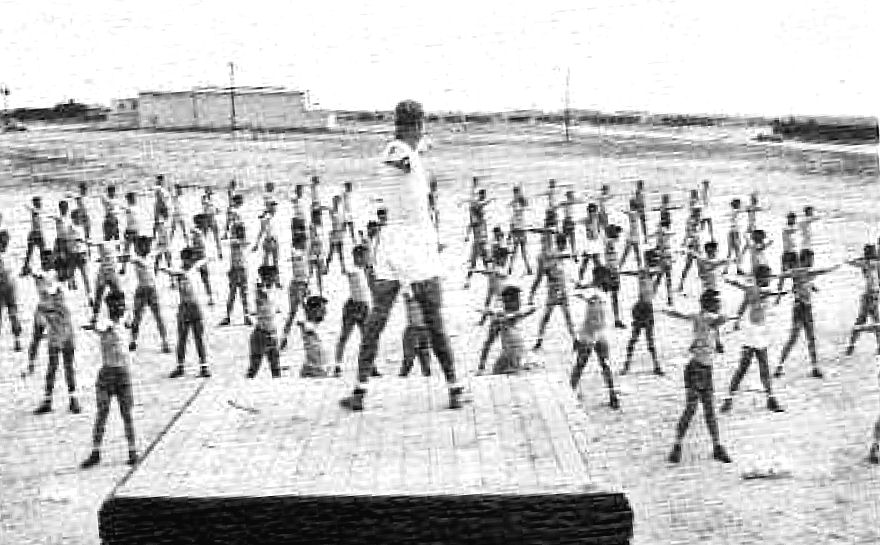
Physical Training

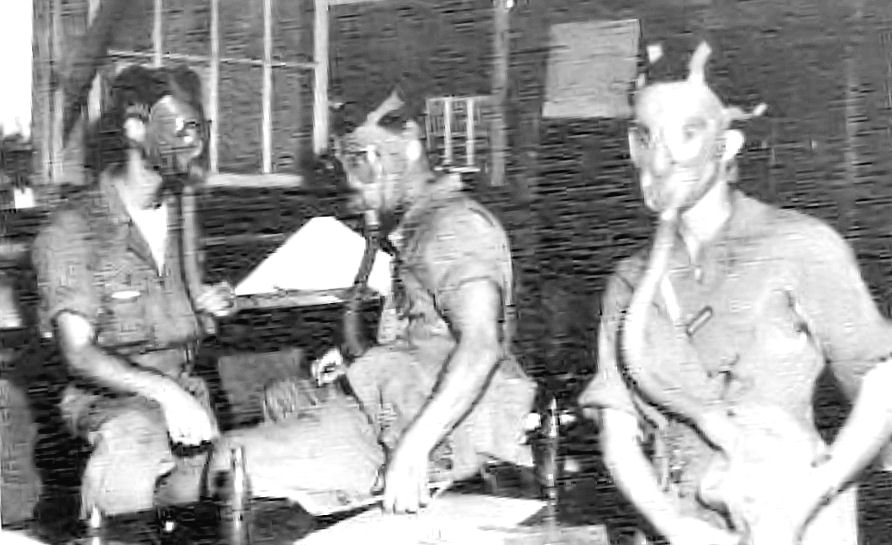
Gas Mask Training

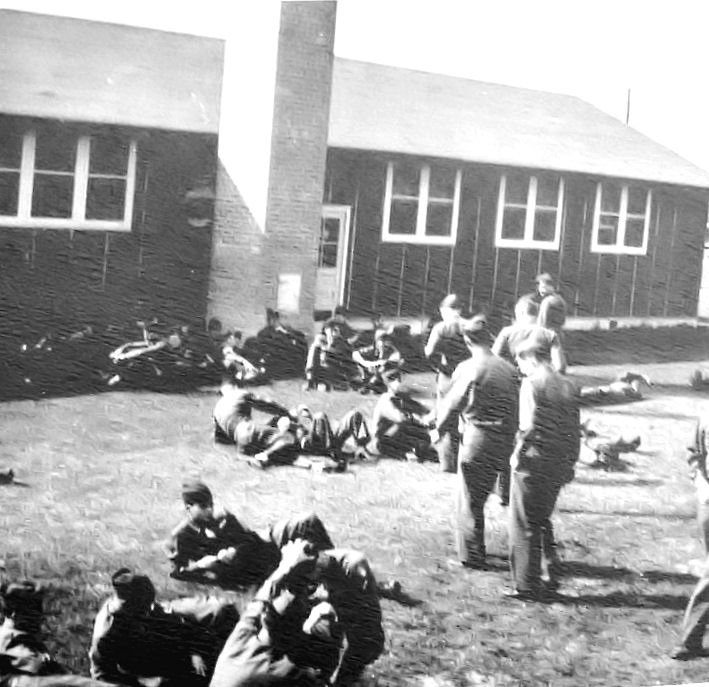
Between ground training classes

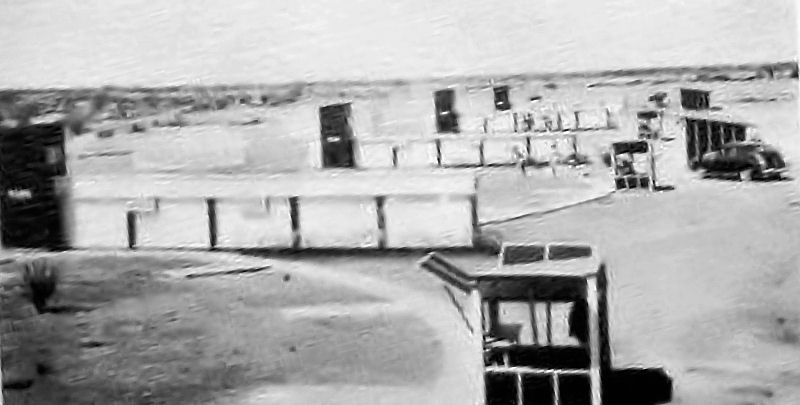
Skeet target practice range

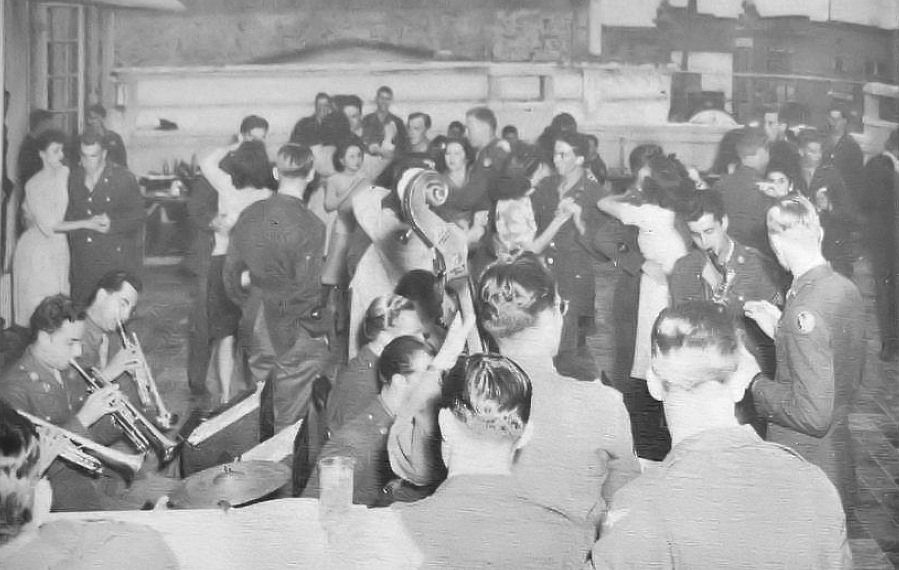
Club dance

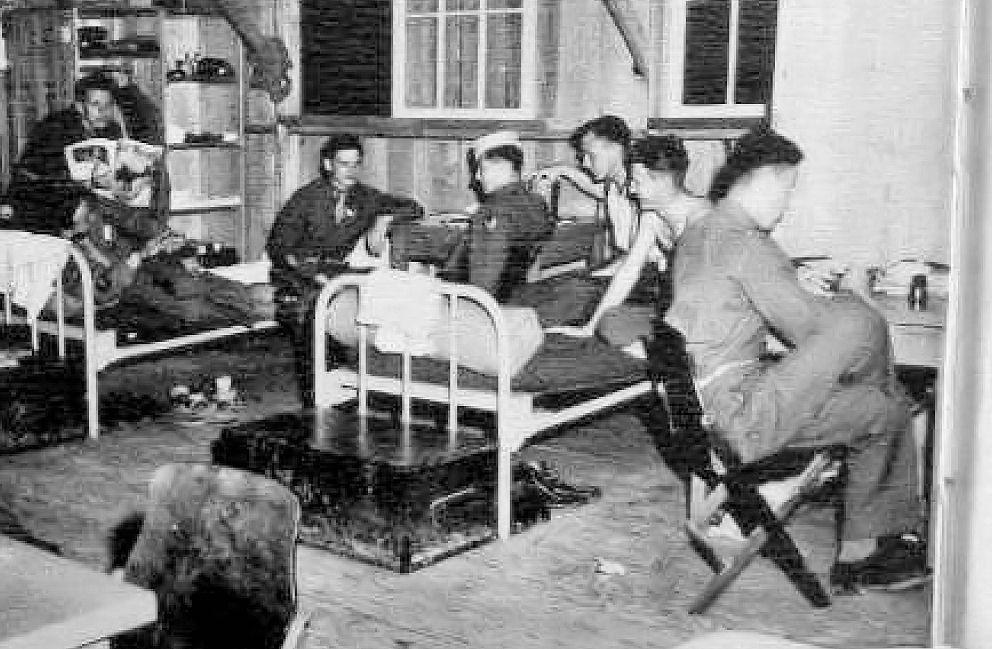
Barracks life

On 19 April 1945, Army Air Forces Training Command notified the base commander at Eagle Pass that the station would be inactivated. Personnel began to be transferred to other bases and the number of personnel was decreased rapidly. All flight training at the field was discontinued on 30 April 1945 and the base was turned over to Air Technical Service Command; the base was inactivated on 1 May 1945.

After inactivation, all useful military equipment was transferred from the base; the wood and tarpaper buildings were dismantled or sold. Title however, was retained by the United States Air Force and the facility was carried as a reserve airfield in the postwar years and through the 1950s.

=== Air Defense Command ===
Eagle Pass Air Force Station
- Part of Air Defense Command (ADC)

Site information
- Type: Air Force Station
- Owner: United States Air Force
- Controlled by: Air Defense Command
- Condition: Closed

Location
- Coordinates: 28°51′36″N 100°31′37″W

Site history
- Built: 1957
- In use: 1957–1963

Garrison information
- Garrison: 733d Aircraft Control and Warning Squadron

In 1953, the United States Air Force Air Defense Command requested a third phase of twenty-five mobile radar sites be constructed to supplement the permanent national network of sites established during the Cold War. In 1957, the Air Force returned and reactivated a portion of the reserve World War II facility; opening Eagle Pass Air Force Station on a small area of the former ground station.

The 733d Aircraft Control and Warning Squadron was assigned to Eagle Pass AFS by the 33d Air Division on 3 July 1957. The squadron began operating an AN/FPS-20A search radar and an AN/FPS-6 height-finder, and initially the station functioned as a Ground-Control Intercept (GCI) and warning station. As a GCI station, the squadron's role was to guide interceptor aircraft toward unidentified intruders picked up on the unit's radar scopes.

In addition to the main facility, Eagle Pass operated several AN/FPS-14 Gap Filler sites:

- Carrizo Springs, TX (TM-188A): 28°30′10″N 99°50′01″W
- Laredo, TX (TM-188B/C/TM-189B): 27°43′34″N 99°26′07″W

In March 1963 the Air Force ordered the Radar site to close and operations ceased on 1 August 1963. With the closure of the ADC radar site, the majority of the station was disposed of, although the airfield was retained by the Air Force.

=== Air Training Command ===
A portion of the wartime Eagle Pass airfield was reopened under the name of Laughlin AF Aux #1 in 1962 for touch and go landings by T-37 Tweet training aircraft based at Laughlin AFB. The wartime NW/SE (14/32) runway was refurbished and asphalted, with the runway extended to the southeast to accommodate overruns on each end. The airfield was uncontrolled and no personnel were assigned to the field.

In 1991 a replacement auxiliary airfield was built in nearby Spofford 29°07′07″N 100°28′21″W, and Eagle Pass Auxiliary field was closed.

=== Current use ===
With the closure of the radar station in 1963, the World War II station area was disposed of by the Air Force and transferred to Maverick County. The former ADC military family housing area was redeveloped into a government civil housing development. The local government also took over the ADC water filtration plant and a sewage disposal plant. Several light commercial and industrial sites were built on the former air base.

At some point between 1991 and 1994, after the closure of the flying field by the Air Force, the touch-and-go runway was apparently operated as a private airfield, named Bowles Airfield.

In the late 1990s, Eagle Pass Municipal Airport was closed and general aviation operations moved to Bowles Airfield, being renamed Maverick County Memorial International Airport (FAA: 5T9). Today, the airport has about 50 general aviation flight operations per month, but no commercial airline service. The airport utilizes the former Air Force NW/SE (14/32) runway, its asphalt in fair condition. The airport also has a terminal and FBO building constructed on the former World War II parking ramp.

The large World War II airfield not used by the Air Force or the airport remains abandoned and left to the elements. Concrete foundations of two of the wartime hangars remain, the structures torn down in the 1960s, and the large parking ramp remains, largely in a deteriorated state. One of the World War II hangars remains and is used by the Maverick County Water Control and Improvement District Number 1.

The Air Defense Command radar station is largely intact. Following the radar-site closure, the FPS-20A and FPS-6 towers were torn down in late 1965. Several abandoned barracks remain standing, although one of the buildings has a collapsed second floor along with the station support buildings, the operations buildings remain standing; all concrete and steel structures, largely overgrown with vegetation and deteriorated after 50 years of abandonment.

Many of the former streets of the station remain in undeveloped areas.

== See also ==
- Radar Base
- Eagle Pass Municipal Airport
- Texas World War II Army Airfields
- 77th Flying Training Wing (World War II)
- List of USAF Aerospace Defense Command General Surveillance Radar Stations
