= Val Verde County Airport =

Former airport in Texas

Val Verde County Airport Del Rio Field
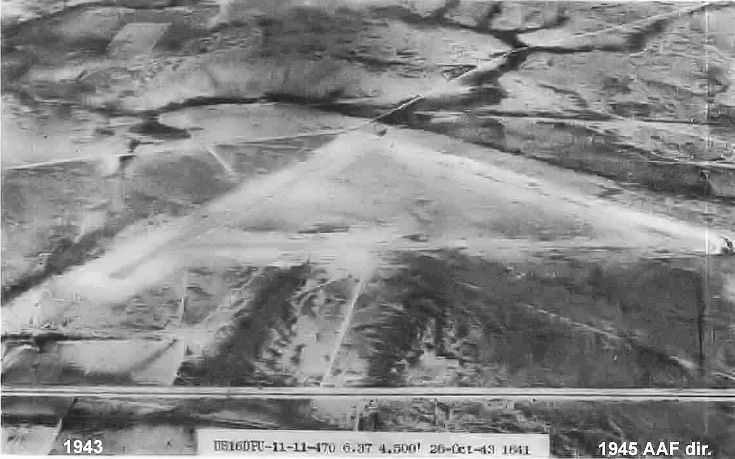
- Val Verde County Airport – Texas, 26 October 1943
- IATA: none; ICAO: none

Summary
- Built: 1919
- In use: 1919–1959
- Coordinates: 29°22′37″N 100°49′12″W

Map
- Val Verde County Airport, Texas

Runways
Direction	Length		Surface
Direction	ft	m	Surface
09/27	5,200	1,585	Asphalt
12/30	3,376	1,029	Asphalt
04/22	4,851	1,479	Asphalt
- Runway information from: Abandoned & Little-Known Airfields: Texas – Laredo area

Val Verde County Airport is a former airport, located in Del Rio, Texas. Airport operations ended in 1959. Today the former airport is a residential site.

== History ==
The airport was established by the Air Service, United States Army in 1919 as a military airfield. It was constructed as a base for observation overflights along the Mexican Border. During this period, Mexico was enduring a period of revolution and unrest, which led to border violations and the deaths of American citizens.

Flight "A" of the 90th Squadron (Surveillance) arrived at Del Rio Field on 12 June 192with de Havilland DH-4 aircraft, and flew observation missions along the border. The 90th operated from Del Rio until the Border Patrol operation ended in June 1921.

The next use of the airfield was when the Department of Commerce refitted the facility as one of its network of Intermediate Landing Fields, which were established in the 1920s & 1930s to serve as emergency landing fields along commercial airways between major cities. It was opened in November 1937 as Val Verde County Airport. On September 26, 1942, during World War II, the airport was taken over by the United States Army Air Forces and used as a contract primary pilot training airfield under the AAF Gulf Coast Training Center (later Central Flying Training Command). Flying training was performed with Fairchild PT-19s as the primary trainer. Also had several PT-17 Stearmans and a few P-40 Warhawks assigned. The training school was inactivated at the end of the war, and the airport was returned to civil control on January 11, 1946.

During the postwar years, the airport remained dormant. It was re-activated by the United States Air Force in 1952 as an auxiliary landing airfield supporting the pilot training mission of Laughlin AFB. In 1958 it was re-designated Laughlin Service Annex, and was disposed of in 1959.

Val Verde County Airport was presumably never reused after that point for civilian aviation, undoubtedly caused by its proximity to Laughlin AFB. The land was sold to private developers and houses and streets began to be overlaid over the former airport. However, the runways remained visible in aerial photography over the years, with some of the runways being converted into streets. Today, some of the old runways remain abandoned but quite visible in aerial imagery.

== See also ==
- Texas World War II Army Airfields
