= Maverick County Memorial International Airport =

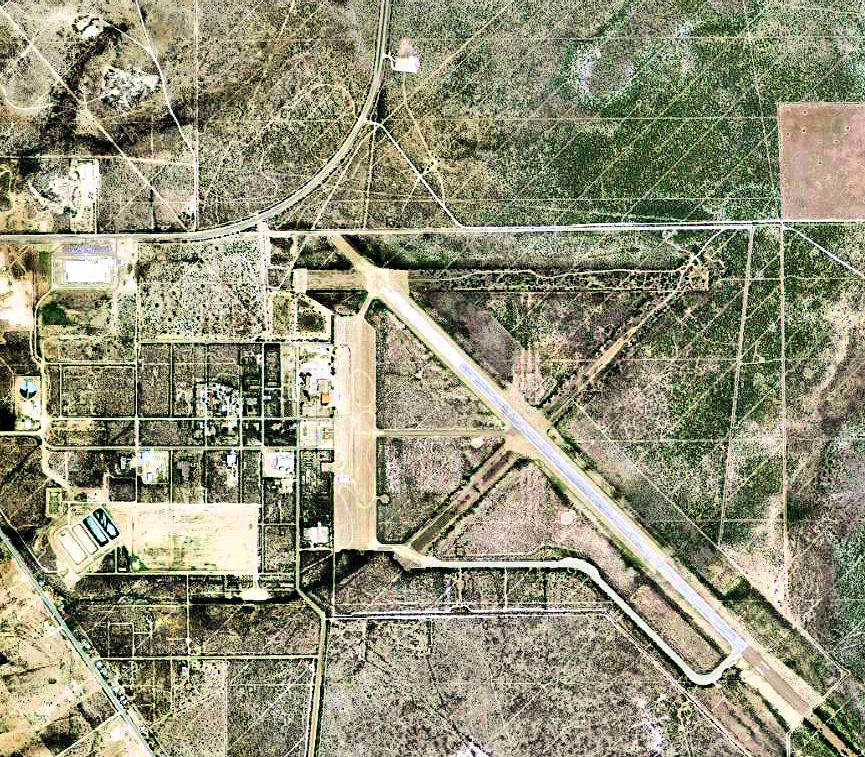
- USGS aerial photo, 2006
- IATA: EGP; ICAO: none; FAA LID: 5T9

Summary
- Airport type: Public
- Owner: County of Maverick
- Serves: Eagle Pass, Texas
- Location: Radar Base, Maverick County, near Eagle Pass, Texas
- Elevation AMSL: 887 ft / 270 m
- Coordinates: 28°51′26″N 100°30′48″W

Map

Runways
Direction	Length		Surface
Direction	ft	m	Surface
13/31	5,506	1,678	Asphalt

Statistics (2023)
- Aircraft operations (year ending 5/27/2023): 2,200
- Based aircraft: 1
- Source: Federal Aviation Administration

For the military use of the airport, see Eagle Pass Army Airfield

Maverick County Memorial International Airport (IATA: EGP, FAA LID: 5T9) is a county-owned public use airport in Maverick County, Texas, United States. It is located eight nautical miles (15 km) north of the central business district of Eagle Pass, Texas.

== Facilities and aircraft ==
Maverick County Memorial International Airport has one asphalt paved runway designated 13/31 which measures 5,506 by 100 feet (1,678 x 30 m). For the 12-month period ending May 27, 2023, the airport had 2,200 general aviation aircraft operations, an average of 42 per week.

== See also ==
- List of airports in Texas
