= Structure of the Spanish Air and Space Force =

The article provides an overview of the entire chain of command and organization of the Spanish Air Force as of 2018 and includes all currently active units. The Spanish Air Force is commanded by the Air Force Chief of Staff or "Jefe de Estado Mayor" (JEMA) in Madrid.

The source for this article is the organization section on the website of the Spanish Air Force.

== Historical background ==
A Government decree dated 2d October 1935 of the Spanish Republican Government that placed the Dirección General de Aeronáutica under the authority of a specific ministry, known then as the War Ministry, Ministerio de la Guerra, instead of being under the Presidencia del Gobierno. Following that decree, the Air Force regional units became restructured in 1936. Accordingly, the Spanish Navy-based Escuadra model was replaced by Región Militar divisions which was operative until for all of the 20th century. Nowadays the Spanish Air Force is still under a separate ministry, the Ministerio de Defensa.

After the Spanish Civil War the bulk of the Spanish Armed Forces changes were introduced within the regional structure, following which all relevant air bases would be withdrawn from Catalonia, a former key region in the development of the Aeronáutica Militar, the Spanish Air Force in its early days. Even though before and during the Civil War important air bases had been established in or around Barcelona, like the Aviación Naval, henceforward the whole northeastern area of Spain would be left with mere token presence of the Spanish Air Force. The situation is similar in the Basque Country as well, with the difference that there had not been any important air bases there before the conflict that shaped the present structure. While Galicia has no significant Air Force Base within its territory, it has nevertheless a very important Naval Base at Ferrol.

== Structure ==
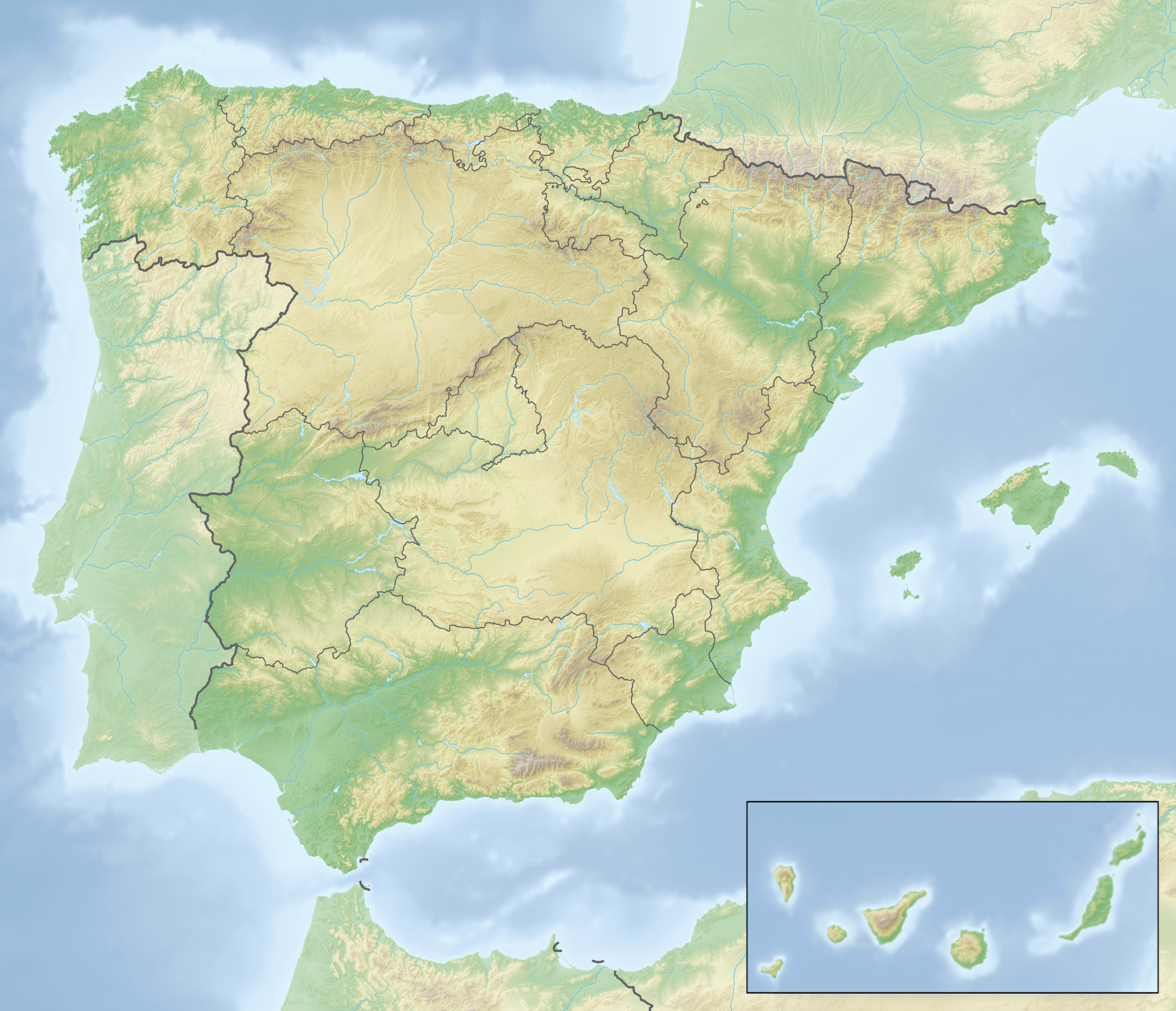
Spanish Air Force locations 2018:
Eurofighter Typhoon EF-18A Hornet F-5M Freedom Fighter C-101 Aviojet
Helicopters other flying units (Gando Air Base to the South on Gran Canaria island)

The Air Force Chief of Staff (JEMA) commands all units of the Spanish Air Force from the headquarter in Madrid.

- Air Force Chief of Staff (JEMA)
  - Air Force Headquarters (CGEA) in Madrid
  - Combat Air Command (MACOM) at Torrejón Air Base
  - General Air Command (MAGEN) in Madrid
  - Canary Islands Air Command (MACAN) in Las Palmas
  - Logistic Support Command (MALOG) in Madrid
  - Personnel Command (MAPER) in Madrid
  - Economic Affairs Directorate (DAE) in Madrid

=== Air Force Headquarters ===
The Air Force Headquarters manages the human and material resources necessary for the JEMA to exercise command over the Air Force.

- Air Force Headquarters in Madrid
  - Air Force Staff (EMA)
  - Air Force Chief of Staff Cabinet (GABJEMA)
  - Technical Services, Information Systems and Telecommunications Service (JSTCIS)
  - Air Force Historical and Cultural Service (SHYCEA)
    - Aeronautics and Astronautics Museum
    - Aeronautical History and Culture Institute
  - Air Force Legal Advice (AJA)
  - Central Intervention Delegate (IDC) (Fiscal Control)
  - Air Force Headquarters Support Grouping (ACGEA)
    - Security Group (GRUSEG)
      - Honor Guard
    - Support Group (GRUAP)
    - Transport Squadron (ESAUT)
    - Air Force Headquarters First Aid Station
    - Air Force Headquarters Pharmacy and Optrician

=== Combat Air Command ===
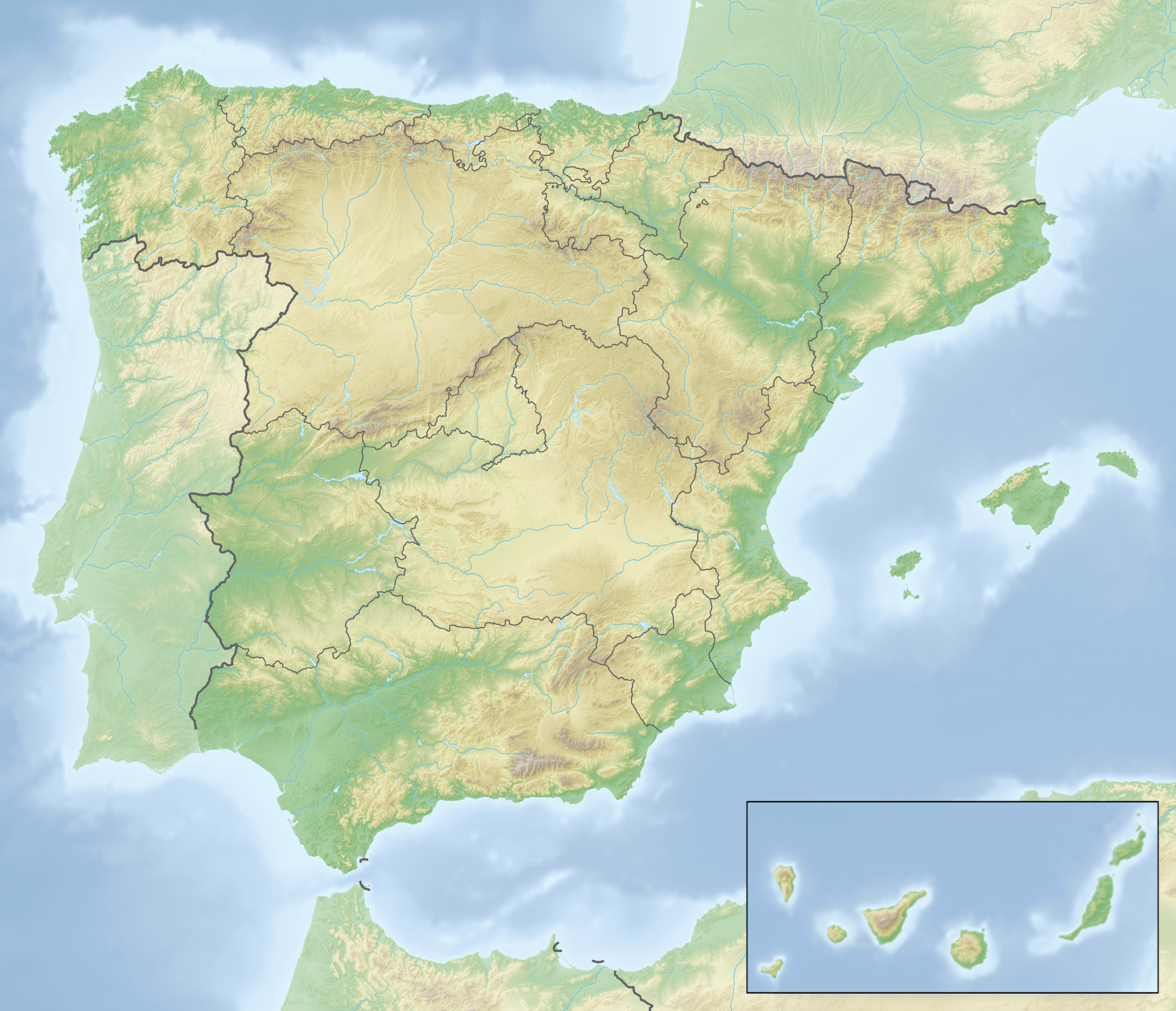
Spanish Air Force radar stations 2018 (+ two stations off map in the Canary Islands)
Radar station with Indra LANZA 3D
Radar station with RAT-31SL/T
Command and Control Center

The Combat Air Command (MACOM) at Torrejón Air Base is the operational headquarter of the Spanish Air Force and responsible for the control and defense of the Spanish airspace.

- Combat Air Command at Torrejón Air Base
  - Combat Air Command Headquarter (CGMACOM) at Torrejón Air Base
    - Combat Air Command General Staff
    - Air Operations Center / NATO CAOC Torrejón, responsible for NATO's Integrated Air Defense System South of the Alps
  - Command and Control Systems Headquarter (JSMC) at Torrejón Air Base
    - Central Command and Control Group (GRUCEMAC) at Torrejón Air Base
    - Northern Command and Control Group (GRUNOMAC) at Zaragoza Air Base
    - Mobile Air Control Group (GRUMOCA) at Tablada Air Base
    - Operational Air Traffic Group (GRUCAO) at Torrejón Air Base
    - 1st Air Surveillance Squadron (EVA 1) radar station at Air Station El Frasno (Zaragoza)
    - 2nd Air Surveillance Squadron (EVA 2) radar station at Air Station Villatobas (Toledo)
    - 3rd Air Surveillance Squadron (EVA 3) radar station at Air Station Constantina (Seville)
    - 4th Air Surveillance Squadron (EVA 4) radar station at Air Station Roses (Girona)
    - 5th Air Surveillance Squadron (EVA 5) radar station at Air Station Aitana in Alcoy (Alicante)
    - 7th Air Surveillance Squadron (EVA 7) radar station at Air Station Puig Major in Sóller (Balearic Islands)
    - 9th Air Surveillance Squadron (EVA 9) radar station at Air Station Motril (Granada)
    - 10th Air Surveillance Squadron (EVA 10) radar station at Air Station Barbanza in Noia (A Coruña)
    - 11th Air Surveillance Squadron (EVA 11) radar station at Air Station Alcalá de los Gazules (Cádiz)
    - 12th Air Surveillance Squadron (EVA 12) radar station at Air Station Espinosa de los Monteros (Burgos)
    - 13th Air Surveillance Squadron (EVA 13) radar station at Air Station Sierra Espuña in Totana (Murcia)
  - Air Mobility Headquarter (JMOVA) at Zaragoza Air Base
  - Special Air Operations and Personnel Recovery Headquarter (JSAO & PR)
  - National Component at NATO's Tactical Leadership Programme (CN - TLP) at Albacete Air Base
  - National Component at the European Tactical Airlift Center (ETAC) at Zaragoza Air Base

The following units are part of the General Air Command but fall operationally under the Combat Air Command:

- 11th Wing and Morón Air Base Command
  - 111th Squadron with Eurofighter Typhoon
  - 113th Squadron with Eurofighter Typhoon (Operational Conversion Unit)
  - 22nd Air Force Group Squadron with P-3M Orion maritime patrol aircraft
- 12th Wing at Torrejón Air Base
  - 121st Squadron with EF-18A Hornet
  - 122nd Squadron with EF-18A Hornet
- 14th Wing and Albacete Air Base Command
  - 141st Squadron with Eurofighter Typhoon
  - 142nd Squadron with Eurofighter Typhoon
- 15th Wing at Zaragoza Air Base
  - 151st Squadron with EF-18A Hornet
  - 152nd Squadron with EF-18A Hornet
  - 153rd Squadron with EF-18A Hornet
- 31st Wing at Zaragoza Air Base (Air Transport)
  - 311th Squadron with A400M Atlas
  - 312th Squadron with A400M Atlas (C/KC-130H retired)
- 35th Wing at Getafe Air Base (Air Transport)
  - 351st Squadron with CASA C-295
  - 352nd Squadron with CASA C-295
- 37th Wing and Villanubla Air Base Command (Air Transport)
  - 371st Squadron with CASA C-212 Aviocar
- 45th Wing at Torrejón Air Base (VIP Transport) with Airbus A310 and Dassault Falcon 900
- 47th Mixed Air Force Group at Torrejón Air Base (Electronic Warfare) with C-212 Aviocar and Falcon 20
- 48th Wing at Cuatro Vientos Air Base
  - 402nd Squadron with SA330 Puma and AS332 Super Puma helicopters
  - 803rd Squadron with CN-235D planes and AS332 Super Puma helicopters (Fixed wing aircraft based at Getafe Air Base)
- Parachute Sappers Squadron (EZAPAC) at Alcantarilla Air Base (Special Forces)
  - Special Forces Company
  - Operational Support Company
  - Training Company
- Air Deployment Support Squadron (EADA) (Force Protection) at Zaragoza Air Base
  - Ground Defense and Combat Search and Rescue Company
  - SHORAD Company
  - Transport Company
  - General Support Company
- Second Air Deployment Support Squadron (SEADA) (Force Protection) at Morón Air Base
  - Ground Defense and Combat Search and Rescue Company
  - Transport Company
  - General Support Company
- Medical Air Evacuation Unit (UMAER) at Torrejón Air Base
- Deployment Support Medical Air Unit (UMAAD-Madrid) at Torrejón Air Base
- Deployment Support Medical Air Unit (UMAAD-Zaragoza) at Zaragoza Air Base
- Bardenas Training Range in Bardenas Reales

=== General Air Command ===
The General Air Command (MAGEN) in Madrid maintains and supports the operational forces, and oversees the Air Force's training and formation units. The following units are all part of the MAGEN, but operationally many fall under the operational control of other higher commands. Therefore, the following listing separates the units of MAGEN according to the air force's operational organization.

- General Air Command in Madrid
  - Rescue Coordination Center (RCC) at Torrejón Air Base
  - 43rd Air Force Group at Torrejón Air Base (Aerial firefighting) with Canadair CL-215 and Canadair CL-415
  - 49th Wing at the Son San Juan Air Base (Mallorca)
    - Balearic Islands Rescue Coordination Center
    - 801st (SAR) Squadron with CN-235D planes and with Sikorsky S-76C helicopters (HD.24)
  - Málaga Air Base and Military Airport Command of Málaga Airport
  - Santiago Military Aerodrome and Military Airport Command of Santiago de Compostela, A Coruña, and Vigo airports
  - Military Airport Command of Melilla Airport
  - Cuatro Vientos Air Base Command
  - Torrejón Air Base Command and Military Airport Command of Madrid-Barajas Airport
  - Zaragoza Air Base Command and Military Airport Command of Zaragoza, Logroño–Agoncillo and Huesca–Pirineos airports
  - Getafe Air Base Command
  - Tablada Air Base Command and Military Airport Command of Seville and Jerez airports
  - Pollença Military Aerodrome in Port de Pollença (Mallorca)
  - Cartography and Photography Center (CECAF) at Cuatro Vientos Air Base
    - Cartography and Photography Group
      - Cartography Squadron
      - Photography and Support Squadron
      - Training Squadron
    - Aircraft Group at Getafe Air Base
      - 403rd Squadron with CN-235 and Cessna Citation V planes
      - 409th Squadron with C90 King Air
      - Maintenance Flight
  - Aerospace Observation Systems Center (CESAEROB) at Torrejón Air Base (Aerial Exploitation unit under operational control of the Chief of Defense)
    - Operational Group
    - Technical and Support Squadron
  - Communication Group (GRUTRA) at Getafe Air Base
    - 1st Communication Squadron provides C4 services to units at Getafe Air Base
    - 2nd Communication Squadron provides C4 services to the air force's headquarter and the General Air Command headquarter
    - 3rd Communication Flight at the Alto de los Leones Air Detachment
    - 4th Communication Flight at the El Vedat Air Detachment
    - 6th Communication Flight at the La Muela Air Detachment
    - Microwave Squadron maintains the air force's Microwave Network
    - Support Squadron

=== Canary Islands Air Command ===
Canary Islands Air Command locations
EF-18A Hornet Air Base
Radar station with Indra LANZA
Radar station with Selex RAT-31SL/T
Command and Control Center

The Canary Islands Air Command (Mando Aéreo de Canarias - MACAN) is responsible for the defense of the Canary Islands and the only regional command.

- Canary Islands Air Command in Las Palmas (Gran Canaria)
  - Canary Islands Air Command Headquarters Group in Las Palmas (Gran Canaria)
  - 21st Air Surveillance Squadron (EVA 21) radar station in Vega de San Mateo (Gran Canaria)
  - 22nd Air Surveillance Squadron (EVA 22) radar station in Haría (Lanzarote)
  - Lanzarote Military Aerodrome in San Bartolomé (Lanzarote)
  - 46th Wing and Gando Air Base Command (Gran Canaria)
    - Warning and Control Group (GRUALERCON)
      - Canary Islands Air Combat Center
    - 462nd Squadron with F/A-18 Hornet fighters
    - Canary Islands Rescue Coordination Center
    - 802nd (SAR) Squadron with CN-235D planes and AS332 Super Puma helicopters

=== Logistic Support Command ===
The Logistic Support Command (MALOG) in Madrid manages the air force's material resources and logistical support.

- Logistic Support Command in Madrid
  - Logistic Support Command Staff
  - Procurement Directorate (DAD) procures material and services as needed by the other MALOG directorates
  - Logistic-Operational Maintenance and Support Directorate (DSO) manages the logistic support for air force units
  - Engineering and Infrastructures Directorate (DIN) manages aeronautical and infrastructure engineering
    - DIN Detachments in Albacete, Palma de Mallorca, Seville and Zaragoza
  - Air Force Logistic Centers
  - Military Aircraft Accidents Technical Investigation Commission

The following units are part of the General Air Command but fall operationally under the Logistic Support Command:

- Armament and Experimentation Logistics Center at Torrejón Air Base (Flight Test Center) with C-101 Aviojet, C-212 Aviocar, and EF-18A Hornet
- Quartermaster Logistics Center (CLOIN) at Torrejón Air Base
- Support Materiel Logistics Center (CLOMA) at Getafe Air Base
- Communications Materiel Logistics Center (CLOTRA) at Getafe Air Base
- Aerial Maintenance Center Albacete (MAESAL) at Albacete Air Base
- Aerial Maintenance Center Madrid (MAESMA) at Cuatro Vientos Air Base

=== Personnel Command ===
The Personnel Command (MAPER) in Madrid manages and controls all personnel matters, including assistance medical and educational aspects.

- Personnel Command in Madrid
  - Personnel Command Staff
  - Planning and Organization Section, to develops the personnel doctrine and corresponding legislation.
  - Air Warfare Center (CEGA) develops the military doctrine of the air force and communicates it to the personnel
  - Personnel Directorate (DPE) tasked with personnel management and military recreational centers
  - Education Directorate (DEN) tasked with managing the air force's educational centers
  - Health Directorate (DISAN) tasked with managing health care, medical supplies and medical research
    - Aerospace Medicine Instruction Center (CIMA) at Torrejón Air Base
      - Military and Civil Personnel Medical Examination Section
      - Physiology and Aeromedical Training Section
      - Instruction and Teaching Section.
      - Plans and Research Section
      - Prevention and Flight Safety Section

The following units are part of the General Air Command but fall operationally under the Personnel Command:

- General Air Academy (AGA) at San Javier Air Base
  - 791st Squadron (Air-training Selection) with T-35C Tamiz
  - 793rd Squadron (Basic Training) with C-101 Aviojet
- Basic Air Academy (ABA) at Military Aerodrome of León (Non Commissioned Officers Academy)
- Aeronautical Techniques School (ESTAER) at Torrejón Air Base
- Command, Control and Telecommunications Techniques School (EMACOT) at Cuatro Vientos Air Base
- Matacán Schools Group (GRUEMA) and Matacán Air Base Command
  - Training Group with C-101 Aviojet and CN-235 planes
  - Support Group
  - Materiel Group
  - Unmanned Aerial Systems School
  - Air Traffic School
  - Military Transport School
- Security, Defense and Support Techniques School (ETESDA) at Zaragoza Air Base
- Military Parachute School at Alcantarilla Air Base
- 23rd Wing at Talavera la Real Air Base (Lead in Trainer)
  - 231st Squadron with F-5M Freedom Fighter
  - 233rd Squadron with General Atomics MQ-9 Predator-B
- 42nd Air Force Group at Villanubla Air Base (Basic Training) with F33C Bonanza
- 78th Wing at Armilla Air Base (Helicopter Training)
  - 781st Squadron with Airbus H135P3H
  - 782nd Squadron with EC 120 Colibri

=== Economic Affairs Directorate ===
The Economic Affairs Directorate (DAE) in Madrid oversees the air force's budget and reports to the Ministry of Defense's General Directorate of Economic Affairs.

- Economic Affairs Directorate in Madrid
  - Economic Affairs Directorate Staff
  - Accounting and Budget Sub-Directorate
  - Economic Management and Contracting Sub-Directorate

== See also ==
- Spanish Air and Space Force
- Spanish Armed Forces
