= Zaragoza Airport =

International airport serving Zaragoza, Aragón, Spain

Zaragoza Airport Aeropuerto de Zaragoza

- IATA: ZAZ; ICAO: LEZG

Summary
- Airport type: Public and military
- Owner/Operator: AENA
- Location: Zaragoza, Aragón, Spain
- Elevation AMSL: 263 m (863 ft)
- Coordinates: 41°39′58″N 01°02′30″W
- Website: aena-aeropuertos.es

Map
- Location within Spain

Runways
Direction	Length		Surface
Direction	m	ft	Surface
12R/30L	3,718	12,200	Concrete
12L/30R	3,024	9,921	Asphalt

Statistics (2019)
- Passengers: 467,774
- Passengers change 18-19: ▼4.4%
- Movements: 10,797
- Movements change 18-19: ▲10.7%
- Cargo (t): 182,659
- Cargo change 18-19: ▲9.5%
- Sources: AENA

Zaragoza Airport (Aragonese and Spanish: Aeropuerto de Zaragoza; IATA: ZAZ, ICAO: LEZG) is an international airport near Zaragoza, Aragón, Spain. It is located 16 km (9.9 miles) west of Zaragoza, 270 km (170 miles) west of Barcelona, and 262 km (163 miles) northeast of Madrid. In addition to serving as a major cargo airport, it is also a commercial airport and, as Zaragoza Air Base, is the home of the Spanish Air and Space Force 15th Group.

The airport is served by a number of passenger airlines, but is mostly known as a cargo operations hub.

== History ==
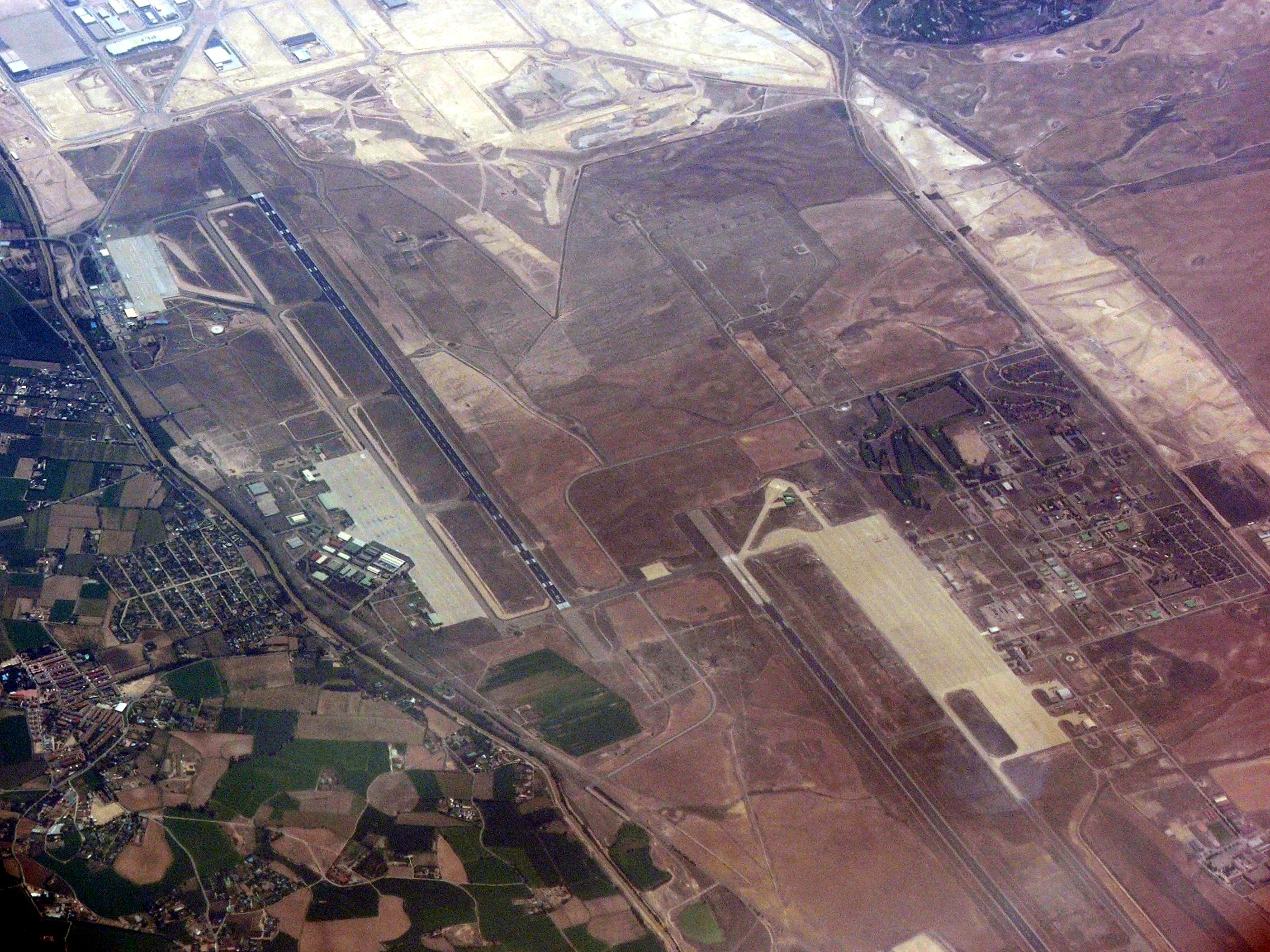
Aerial view

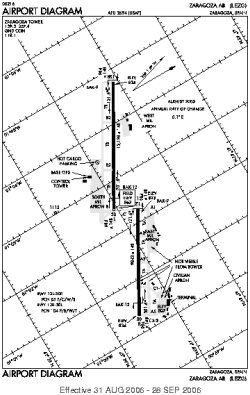
Airport diagram

During the Cold War, the United States Air Force (USAF) used the facility as Zaragoza Air Base.

The construction work on Zaragoza Airport began in September 1954 with the enlargement and improvement of the existing Spanish Air Force Base located there. United States Navy engineers upgraded the facility for temporary or intermediate use as a war standby base. The first U.S. construction project included strengthening the existing 3,024 m (9,921 ft) runway and adding 304 m (1,000 ft) overruns at each end. Work on a new concrete runway, 61 by 3,718 metres (200 ft × 12,200 ft), with 61 m (200 ft) overruns at each end, began in 1956 and was completed in 1958.

Zaragoza was one of three major USAF Cold War airbases in Spain, the others being Torrejón Air Base near Madrid and Morón Air Base near Seville.

The airport was also used by NASA as a contingency landing site for the Space Shuttle in the case of a Transoceanic Abort Landing (TAL). Zaragoza was chosen as a NASA Space Shuttle TAL site due to its long runway, which needs to be longer than 7,500 feet, its pleasant weather, and alignment with Shuttle launches to the high-inclination International Space Station orbit. The base also has a military-grade navigation system called a TACAN (tactical air navigation) that can adapt to the special guidance devices NASA used with its shuttles.

== Airlines and destinations ==
=== Passenger ===
Airlines	Destinations
Binter Canarias	Gran Canaria, Tenerife–North
Fly2Galicia	Santiago de Compostela (begins 1 December 2026)
Ryanair	Bergamo, Charleroi, London–Stansted, Marrakesh; Seasonal: Palma de Mallorca
Volotea	Seasonal: Menorca
Vueling	Palma de Mallorca
Wizz Air	Bucharest–Otopeni, Cluj-Napoca, Milan–Malpensa, Rome–Fiumicino, Santiago de Compostela (begins 17 December 2026)

=== Cargo ===
Airlines	Destinations
Air China Cargo	Amsterdam, Shanghai–Pudong, Tianjin
Atlas Air	Almaty, Amsterdam, Baku, Bangkok–Suvarnabhumi, Delhi, Dubai–Al Maktoum, Istanbul, Liège, Mexico City, Mexico City–AIFA, Miami, Phnom Penh, Riyadh, Seoul–Incheon, Sharjah, Tel Aviv, Zhengzhou
Avianca Cargo	Amsterdam, Bogotá, Miami
Cargolux	Luxembourg
China Cargo Airlines	Amsterdam, Shanghai–Pudong
Emirates SkyCargo	Dubai–Al Maktoum, Mexico City, Quito
Ethiopian Cargo	Addis Ababa, Bogotá, Guangzhou, Liège, Mexico City, Miami
Geosky	Türkmenabat
Qatar Airways Cargo	Beirut, Chicago–O'Hare, Dhaka, Doha, Houston–Intercontinental, Los Angeles, Luxembourg, Mexico City, New York-JFK, Quito
Saudia Cargo	Dammam, Riyadh

== Statistics ==
Zaragoza Airport – traffic information
Year	Passengers (change)	Movements (change)	Cargo tons (change)
2011	751,097 (+24.0%)	11,970 (-5.9%)	48,609 (+14.3%)
2012	551,406 (-26.6%)	9,268 (-22.6%)	71,094 (+46.1%)
2013	457,284 (-17.1%)	7,597 (-18.3%)	71,661 (+0.7%)
2014	418,576 (-8.5%)	7,039 (-7.3%)	86,311 (+20.4%)
2015	423,873 (+1.3%)	7,050 (+0.1%)	85,741 (-0.8%)
2016	419,529 (-1.0%)	7,269 (+3.1%)	110,564 (+29.0%)
2017	438,035 (+4.4%)	7,965 (+9.6%)	142,185 (+29.1%)
2018	489,064 (+11.6%)	8,991 (+12.9%)	166,834 (+17.3%)
2019	467,774 (-4.4%)	8,770 (-2.5%)	182,659 (+9.5%)
2020	172,344 (-63.2%)	6,559 (-25.2%)	143,600 (-21,4%)

=== Busiest routes ===
Busiest international routes from ZAZ (2023)
Rank	Destination	Passengers	Change 2022/23
1	London-Stansted	74,057	▲4%
2	Bucharest-Otopeni	65,422	▲10%
3	Bergamo	51,316	▲11%
4	Cluj-Napoca	46,501	▲9%
5	Charleroi	34,755	▲16%
6	Beauvais	34,249	▲9%
7	Marrakesh	33,885	▲29%
8	Treviso	25,539	New route
9	Bologna	21,398	0%
10	Lisbon	7,960	▼29%
Source: Estadísticas de tráfico aereo

Busiest domestic routes from ZAZ (2023)
Rank	Destination	Passengers	Change 2022/23
1	Palma de Mallorca	121,366	▲12%
2	Tenerife-North	53,980	▲4%
3	Gran Canaria	27,705	▼6%
4	Santiago de Compostela	26,806	New route
5	Menorca	18,381	▼3%
Source: Estadísticas de tráfico aereo

== Ground transport ==
Currently, the airport is connected to the city center by a bus line (501), which goes from the Puerta del Carmen square, downtown, to the airport, also stopping at the city's main railway station, Zaragoza-Delicias. This train station is an important hub for long-distance trains, AVE high-speed trains and the commuter line of Cercanías Zaragoza, which takes passengers underground through the city and overground in the metropolitan area. In February 2023, Zaragoza mayor's office confirmed plans to create a direct bus service "on demand" from June 2023. This line will be serviced by electric buses to start and will significantly reduce journey distances and the duration (it will be about 12 or 13 kilometers depending on the direction). Schedules of these buses will be coordinated with those of the flights scheduled at the airport.
