= Ala 12 =

- Emblem of the 12th Wing of Spanish Air and Space Force
- Country: Spain
- Branch: (Spain) Ejército del Aire y del Espacio
- Type: Wing
- Role: Air Defence
- Part of: Ejército del Aire y del Espacio
- Garrison/HQ: Torrejón Air Base
- Mascot(s): Black cat

Aircraft flown
- Fighter: McDonnell Douglas EF-18A/B Hornet

Ala 12 (English: Wing 12) is an Ejército del Aire y del Espacio (English: Spanish Air and Space Force) wing based at Torrejón Air Base. The wing operates McDonnell Douglas EF-18A/B Hornet fighter aircraft for air defense and international deployments under the operational and organizational command of Combat Air Command (MACOM) The squadron's motto is "no le busques tres pies..."

== History ==
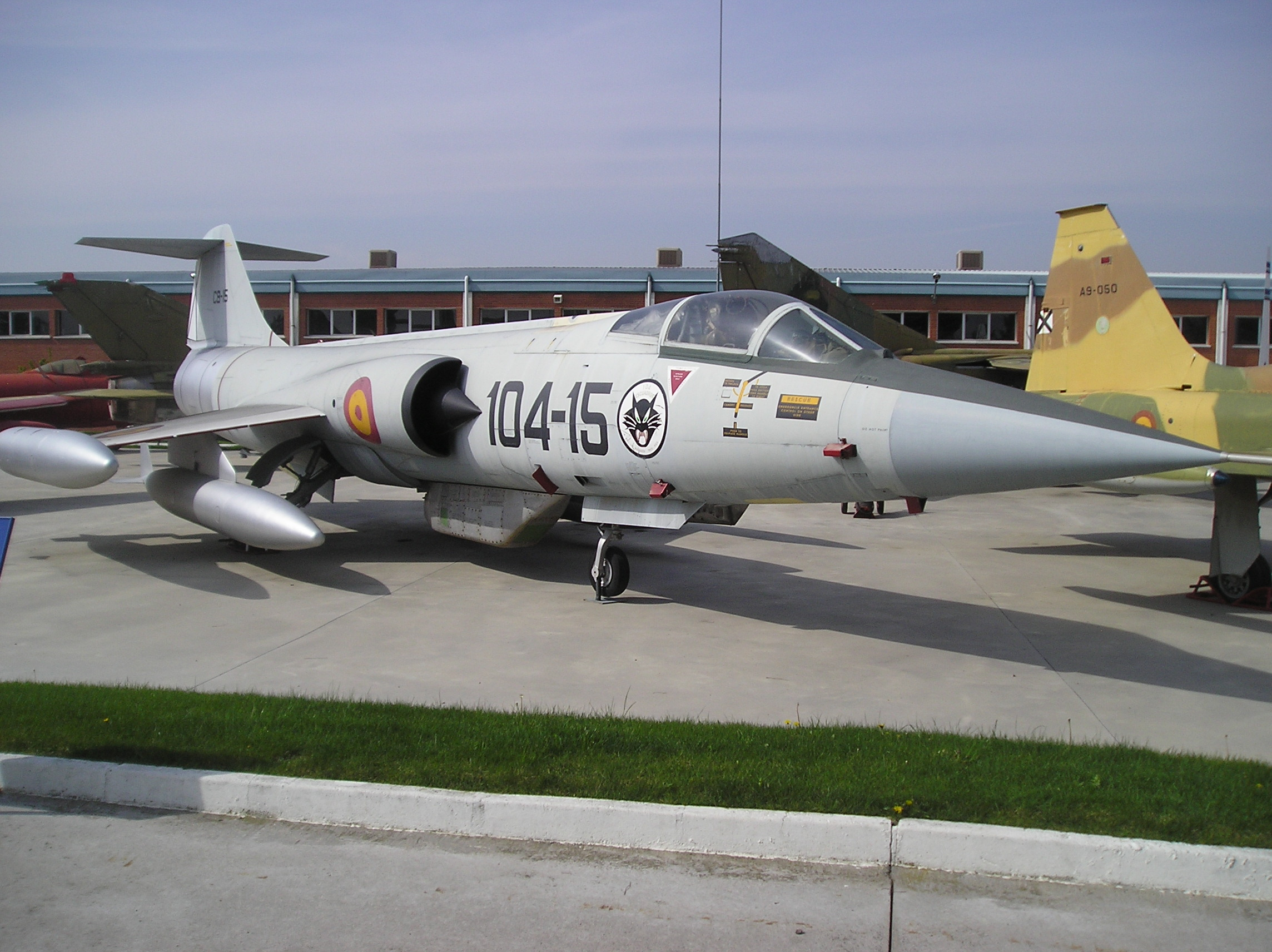
Preserved F-104G

The wing was founded as Fighter Wing 6 (Ala de Caza nº 6) in June 1959 as the parent unit of the 61st Fighter Squadron already based at Torrejón with North American F-86F Sabre fighters. During the mid 1960s, the Air Force was reorganized and the wing renamed Ala 16 as part of the newly formed Tactical Aviation Command. The 61st Fighter Squadron was likewise renamed 161 Squadron in accordance with the Air Force's new numbering scheme. Around this time, the unit's equipment was upgraded with the arrival of 21 Lockheed F-104G Starfighter aircraft.

Ala 12 acquired its current designation on 25 March 1971 and it soon began to receive the McDonnell Douglas F-4C Phantom II fighter aircraft. This permitted the F-86 to be retired from the wing with 50,000 flight hours logged on the type. Further shipments of F-4Cs led to the end of F-104 operations as well; the final F-104 flight from Torrejón took off on 25 January 1973. The F-104's service with the wing was the shortest of any fighter type, the wing only tallying 17,000 flight hours on the Starfighter. To support the ability of the F-4 to be refueled in flight, Boeing KC-97L Stratofreighters were assigned to the wing under the newly formed 123 Squadron, which remained with the wing through 1976. Reconnaissance was added to the wing's capabilities in October 1978 when 122 Squadron added four ex-United States Air Force RF-4C aircraft.

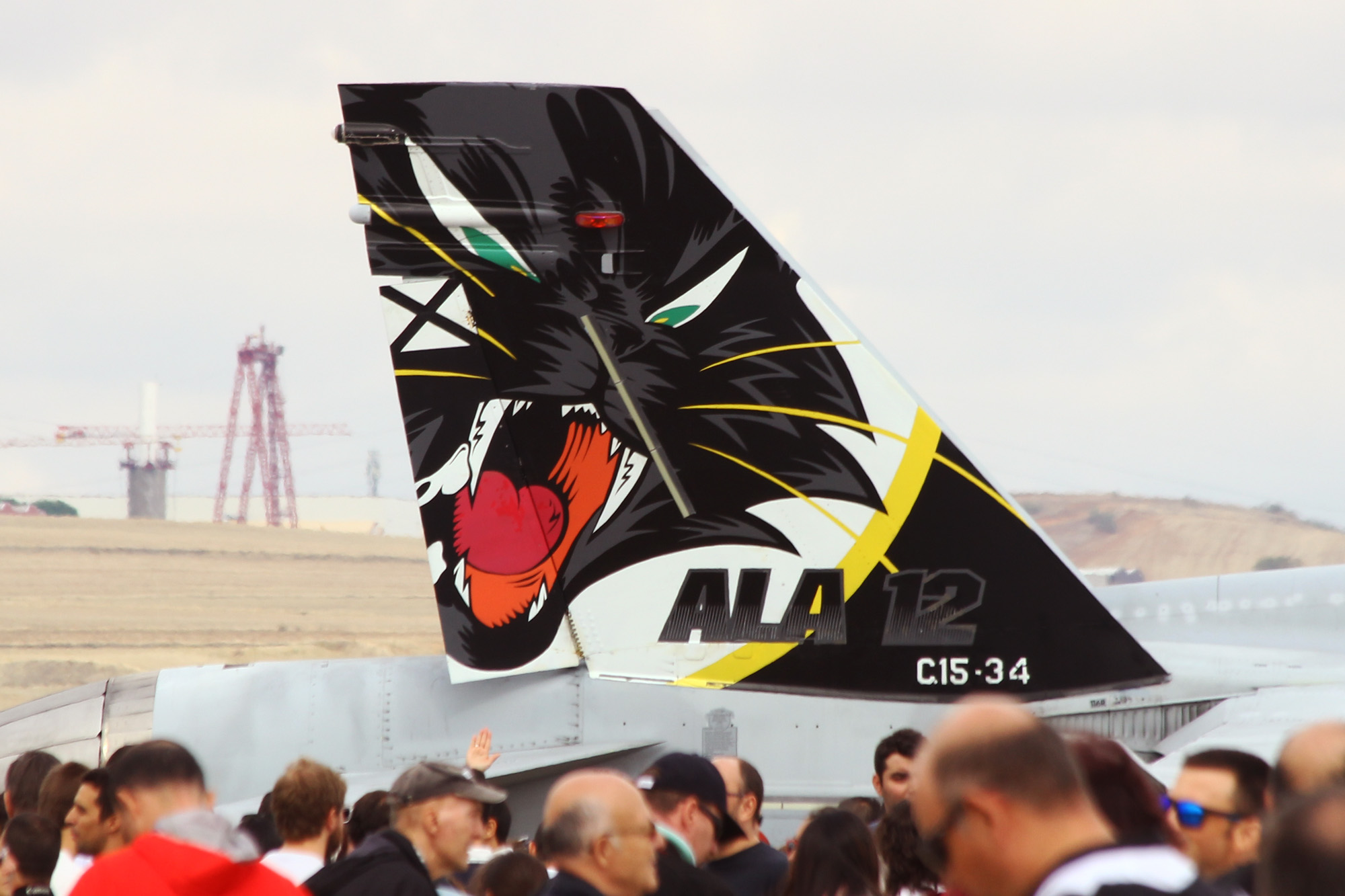
Tail of an EF-18A of Ala 12 with the famous cat for the motto of the wing "No le busques los tres pies al gato" "Don't look for the cat's three feet" in English, a famous proverb in Spanish which has as its origin in the novel of Don Quixote de la Mancha.

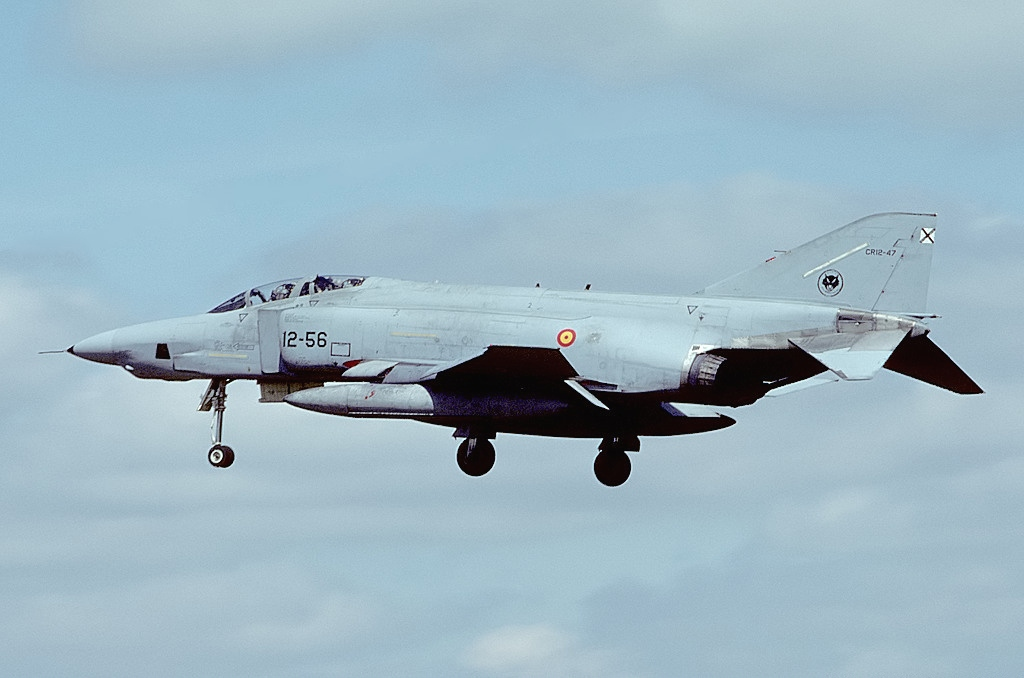
Former McDonnell RF-4C Phantom II of Ala 12

1989 marked the beginning of the wing's transition to its current equipment as the 121 and 122 Squadrons began to re-equip with EF-18A/B Hornet aircraft that remains its prime aircraft to this day. For a while, the RF-4C was retained for reconnaissance work with 123 Squadron, its complement peaking at 14 aircraft in 1995. Torrejón was also tasked with operational conversion for the Air Force's EF-18 program, and to this end, 124 Squadron was formed until the task was transferred to Ala 15 at Zaragoza.

Ala 12's first major international duty came when the wing formed the core of Detachment Icarus, Spain's air contingent of Operation Deliberate Force and Operation Allied Force. This duty was shared with Ala 15, and both rotated forces through the detachment from 1995 through 2002. Ala 12 was awarded the Air Medal for this operations. 123 Squadron was disbanded in October 2002 and the operation of the RF-4C came to an end with 90,000 flight hours having been logged by the wing on the Phantom II, leaving the EF-18 as the sole equipment of the wing. In November 2003, Ala 12 flight hours on the Hornet exceeded 100,000, a total greater than that flown by any of the unit's previous aircraft types. Ala 12's Hornets were the first Spanish aircraft to undergo a mid-life update, and in 2006, 122 Squadron was recognized by NATO an operational evaluation rating of "Mission Capable".

121 Squadron was deployed to Decimomannu Air Base on the island of Sardinia in Italy with four planes to constitute Detachment Argos. They provided the initial Spanish contingent of NATO forces in Operation Odyssey Dawn, the American-led portion of the 2011 military intervention in Libya, from 19–28 March 2011. Following this, they participated in NATO's Operation Unified Protector until mid-May 2011 when relieved by 122 Squadron, which was in turn relieved by Ala 15 on 6 July 2011.

== Aircraft ==
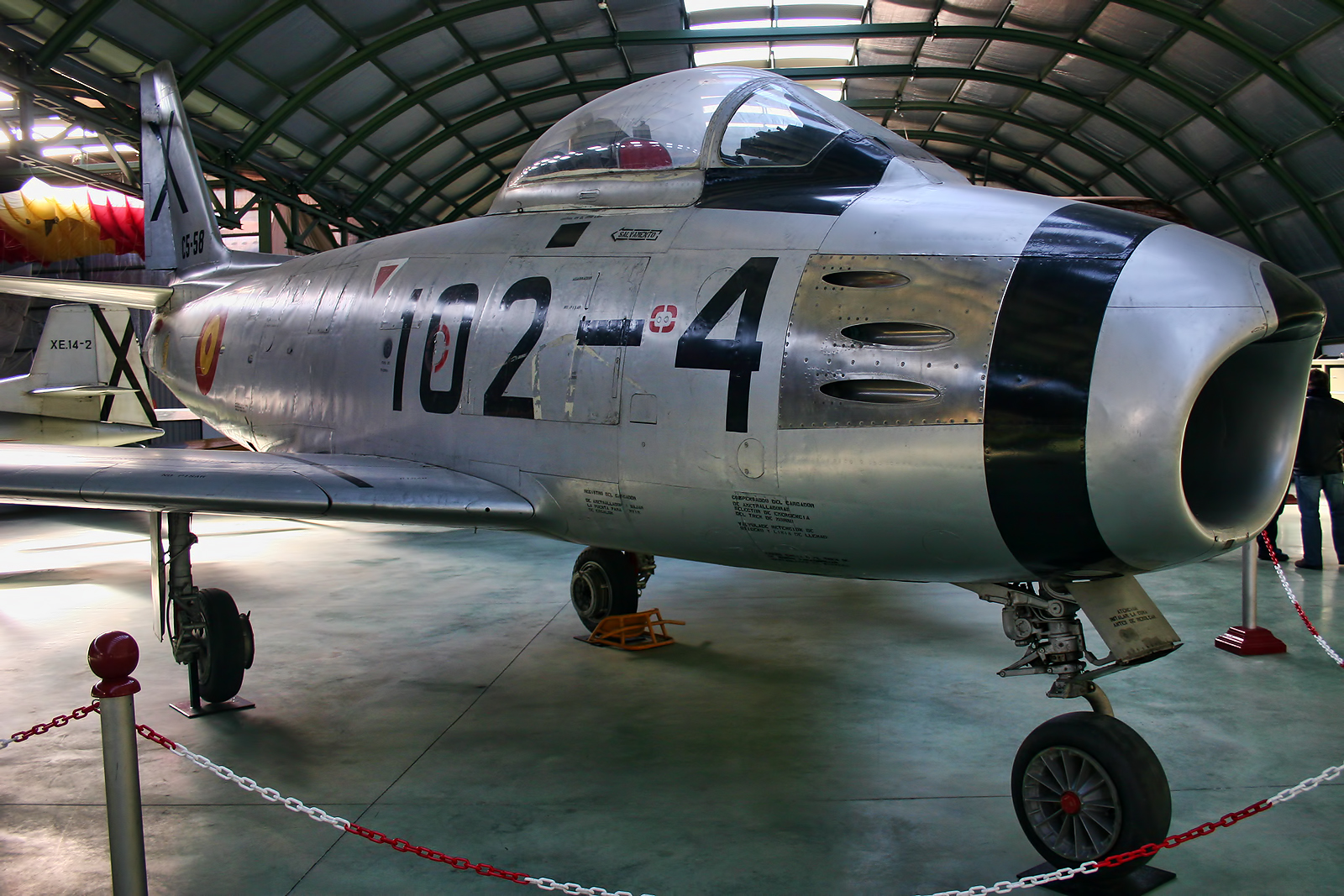
Preserved C.5 from 102 Squadron

C.5 Sabre
Original equipment of the 61st Fighter Squadron, the F-86F Sabre served from the wing's formation until final retirement in 1967.
C.8 Starfighter
The F-104G Starfighter served from 1965 through 1973.
C.12 Phantom II
The F-4C Phantom II operated with Ala 12 from 1971 through 1989.

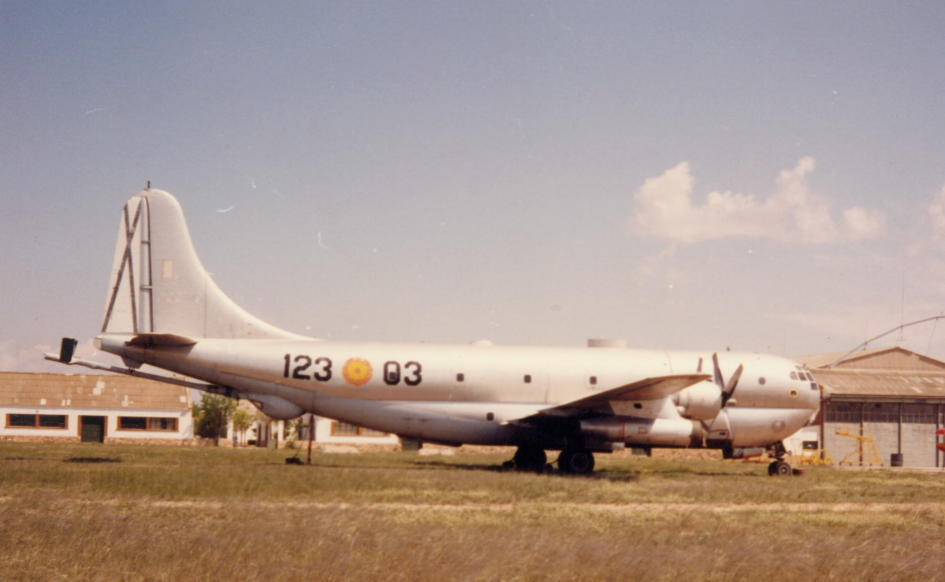
Retired KC-97L of 123 Squadron

KC-97L Stratofreighter
Briefly in service from 1973 to 1976, the KC-97L gave Ala 12 an organic aerial refueling capability.
RC.12 Phantom II
The RF-4C Phantom II provided the wing's reconnaissance capability from 1978 through 2002.
C.15 Hornet
Current equipment of the wing, the EF-18A was introduced in 1989 and received a mid-life update in 2004.
CE.15 Hornet
Serving alongside the single-seat EF-18A, the two-seat EF-18B serves as the unit's operational conversion aircraft.

== Bases ==
Torrejón Air Base
The Spanish Air and Space Force base located at Madrid–Torrejón Airport has been Ala 12's home since its founding in 1959.
Aviano Air Base
Ala 12 deployed to Aviano from 1995 to 2002.
Decimomannu Air Base
Ala 12 aircraft used Decimomannu from March to July 2011.
