= 613th Tactical Fighter Squadron =

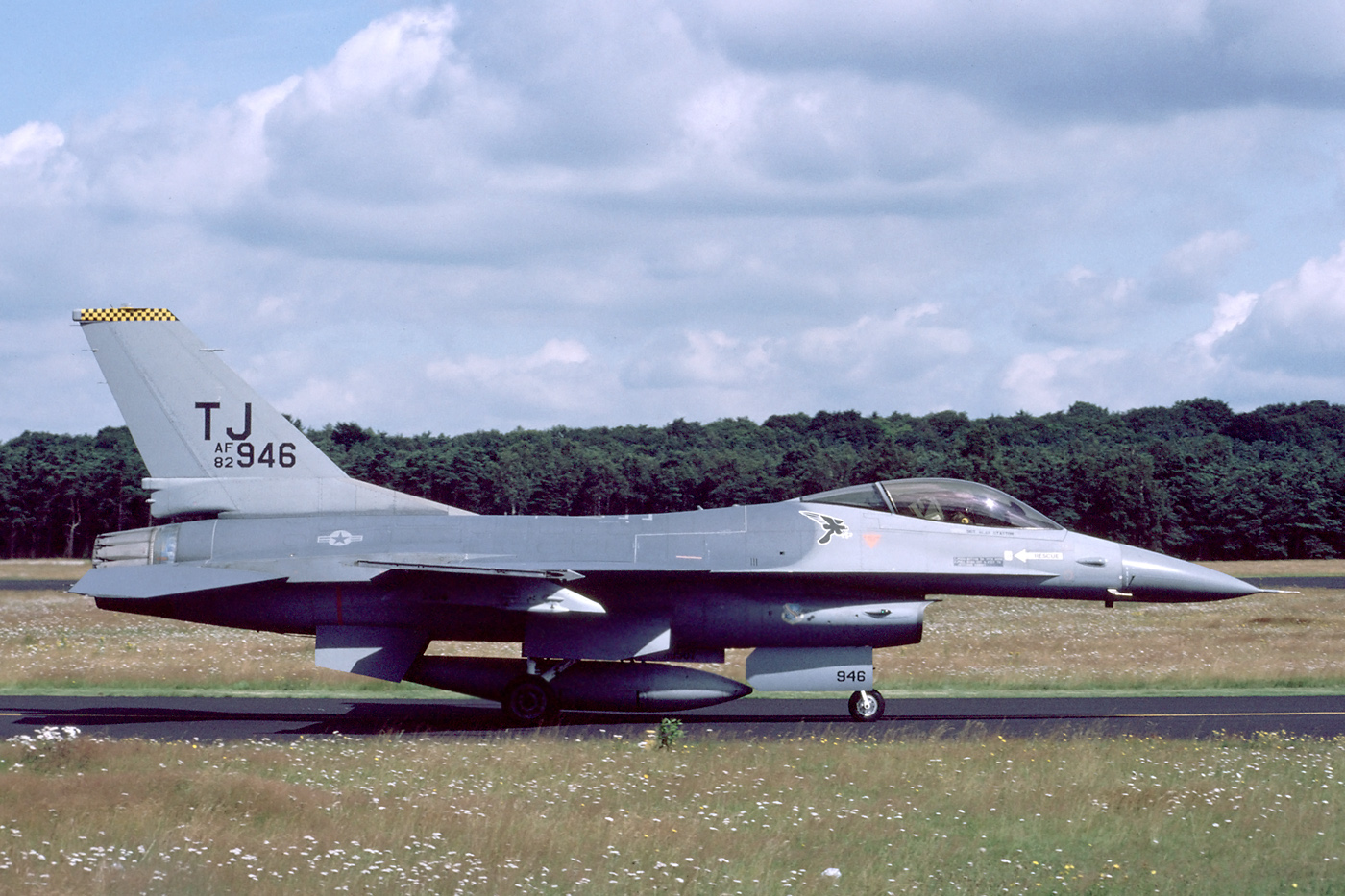
- F-16A Fighting Falcon of the 613th Squadron (Note: Taken at Soesterberg in August 1984. Aircraft is General Dynamics F-16A Block 15L Fighting Falcon, serial 82-0946 It was sent to the Aerospace Maintenance and Regeneration Center on 28 December 2006. Baugher, Joe (21 April 2023). "1982 USAF Serial Numbers". Joe Baugher.. It later served with the Arizona Air National Guard.)
- Active: 1943–1945; 1947–1949; 1954–1991
- Country: United States
- Branch: United States Air Force
- Role: Tactical Fighter
- Engagements: European Theater of Operations
- Decorations: Distinguished Unit Citation; Air Force Outstanding Unit Award

Insignia
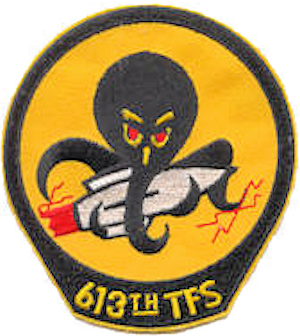
- Patch with 613th Tactical Fighter Squadron emblem (Note: Approved February 1955. Description: On a disc Air Force yellow bordered black, a caricatured octopus of the second [color mentioned], with tentacles, markings and face features of the first [color mentioned], eyeballs red; grasping with three of his tentacles a rocket inflamed and with two of his tentacles twirling flashes of firepower all proper.)

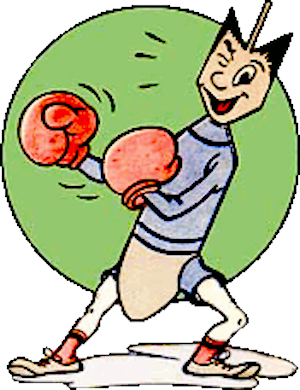
- 613th Bombardment Squadron emblem (World War II) (Note: This emblem was designed for the squadron by the Disney Studios. Closway, p. 36.)

The 613th Tactical Fighter Squadron is an inactive United States Air Force unit. It was last assigned to the 401st Tactical Fighter Wing, stationed at Torrejon Air Base, Spain, where it was inactivated on 28 June 1991.

The squadron was first activated during World War II as the 613th Bombardment Squadron. After training in the United States it moved to England, where it participated in the strategic bombing campaign against Germany. It earned two Distinguished Unit Citations for combat action. Following V-E Day, the squadron was inactivated in England. It was briefly active in the reserves from 1947 to 1949, but does not appear to have been fully manned or equipped.

The squadron was redesignated the 613th Fighter-Bomber Squadron and activated in 1954 at Alexandria Air Force Base, Louisiana. In 1966 it moved to Torrejon Air Base, Spain, where it continued fighter operations until inactivating in 1991.

== History ==
=== World War II ===
==== Organization and training for combat ====
The 613th Bombardment Squadron was activated March 1943 at Ephrata Army Air Base, Washington, as one of the original squadrons of the 401st Bombardment Group. The initial cadre for the squadron was drawn from the 395th Bombardment Group at Ephrata and the 383d Bombardment Group at Rapid City Army Air Field, South Dakota. The cadre soon departed for Orlando Army Air Base, Florida, where they conducted simulated combat missions with the Army Air Forces School of Applied Tactics from Brooksville Army Air Field.

The ground echelon moved to Geiger Field, Washington in May 1943 and to Great Falls Army Air Base, Montana, in July. At Great Falls the first combat crews were assigned to the squadron. In the final stage of training the squadrons dispersed with the 613th training at Cut Bank Army Air Field.

After completing training the ground echelon left for overseas on 19 October 1943. After staging at Camp Shanks, New York they embarked on the RMS Queen Mary and sailed on 27 October disembarking at Greenock on the Firth of Clyde on 3 November 1943. The air echelon staged for deployment at Scott Field, Illinois then flew to England under the control of Air Transport Command via Newfoundland, Iceland and Scotland.

==== Combat in the European Theater ====
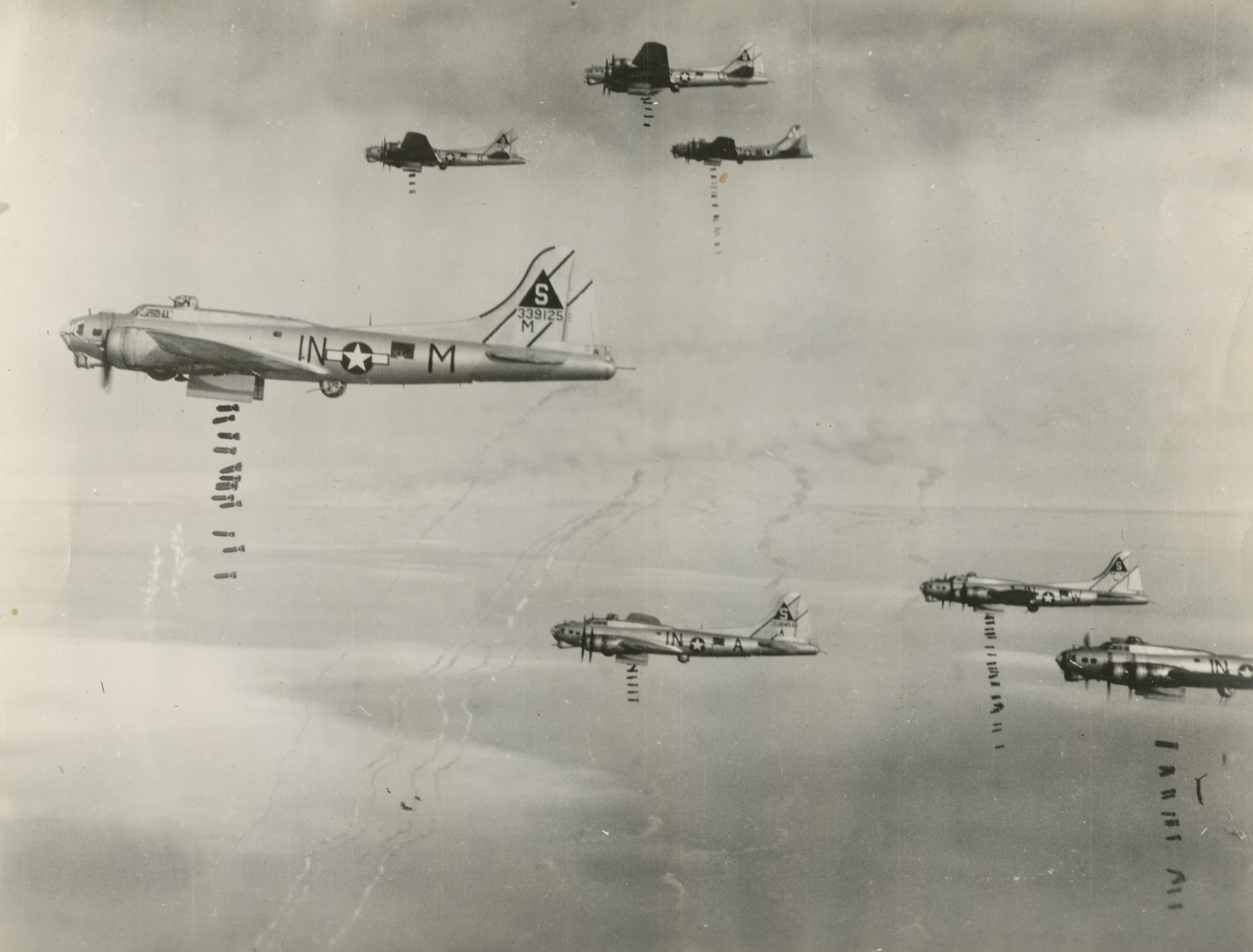
613th Squadron B-17s drop bombs on Lohne, Germany (Note: The closest aircraft is Boeing B-17G-105-BO Flying Fortress, serial 43-39125, Der Grosse Arsch Vogel later You All Right, fuselage code IN-M. This plane was shot down on the squadron's last mission on 20 April 1945. Baugher, Joe (30 April 2023). "1943 USAF Serial Numbers". Joe Baugher., Missing Air Crew Report 14174.)

On arrival in England, half of the 401st Group's aircrews were immediately reassigned to the 351st Bombardment Group. The rest of the squadron became part of the Eighth Air Force at RAF Deenethorpe. The 613th became part of the 92d Combat Bombardment Wing of the 1st Bombardment Division. The group's tail code was Triangle-S.

On 26 November the 613th flew its first combat mission against Bremen, Germany. The 401st Group did not suffer the combat loss of an airplane until its ninth mission on 30 December. The squadron operated chiefly against strategic targets, bombing industries, submarine facilities, shipyards, missile sites, marshalling yards, and airfields. On 11 January 1944 the squadron was in the lead group of the 1st Bombardment Division in an attack against aircraft manufacturing facilities at Oschersleben, Germany. Although the bombers were able to attack, poor weather conditions prevented the division from receiving effective fighter cover. For over three hours the bomber formation suffered more than 400 attacks by Luftwaffe fighters, including air-to-air rocket attacks. Despite these attacks the unit continued its attack and struck a telling blow against German aircraft production for which the squadron was awarded a Distinguished Unit Citation (DUC).

A little over a month later, on 20 February, the squadron earned its second DUC for an attack on the Erla Maschinenwerke aircraft manufacturing facilities in Leipzig, Germany. Despite fighter attacks and battle damage to the 613th's planes, 100% of the unit's bombs fell within 1000 feet of the aiming point. Beginning in October 1944, the unit concentrated its attacks on Axis oil reserves.

In addition to strategic missions, squadron operations included attacks on transportation, airfields, and fortifications prior to Operation Overlord, the Normandy invasion. On D-Day the 613th attacked Normandy beachhead areas dropping bombs five minutes before troops landed. The following month it provided close air support for Operation Cobra, the breakthrough at Saint-Lô, it also supported the siege of Brest in August and Operation Market Garden in September. During the Battle of the Bulge in December 1944 and January 1945, the unit attacked transportation and communications in the battle area. It supported airborne forces involved in Operation Varsity, the airborne assault across the Rhine in March 1945.

The squadron flew its last combat mission on 20 April 1945 against Brandenberg. It had flown 254 combat missions from Deenethorpe airfield. After V-E Day, the squadron flew missions to Linz, Austria to evacuate British and French prisoners of war. It also flew "Trolley" sightseeing missions at low level, flying ground support personnel over the Ruhr and Frankfurt am Main to see the damage that had been done as a result of their efforts.

The unit was alerted for redeployment to the Pacific Theater and the last plane departed Deenethorpe in early June. The ground echelon sailed on the RMS Queen Elizabeth on the fifth. Upon arrival in the US, personnel were granted thirty days leave, reassembling at Sioux Falls Army Air Field, South Dakota, but plans had changed and personnel were either transferred to Boeing B-29 Superfortress units or processed for discharge and the squadron was inactivated.

=== Reserve operations ===
The squadron was activated at Brooks Field (later Brooks Air Force Base), Texas in January 1947 as a unit of the reserves. It trained under the supervision of the 178th AAF Base Unit (later 2593d Air Force Reserve Training Center) of Air Defense Command (ADC). It is not clear whether or not the squadron was fully staffed or equipped. In 1948, Continental Air Command assumed responsibility for managing reserve and Air National Guard units from ADC. President Truman's reduced 1949 defense budget required reductions in the number of units in the Air Force, and the 613th was inactivated in June.

=== Fighter operations ===
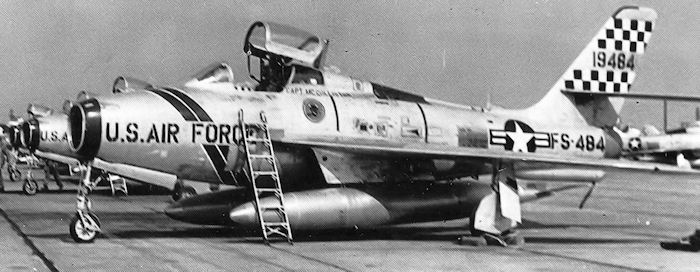
401st Group F-84F Thunderstreak (Note: Closest aircraft is Republic F-84F Thunderstreak, serial 51-9484. This plane was transferred to the Illinois Air National Guard in 1957, but was returned to the regular air force in 1963 to equip the 15th Tactical Fighter Wing until it received McDonnell F-4C Phantom IIs. Baugher, Joe (6 May 2023). "1951 USAF Serial Numbers". Joe Baugher.)

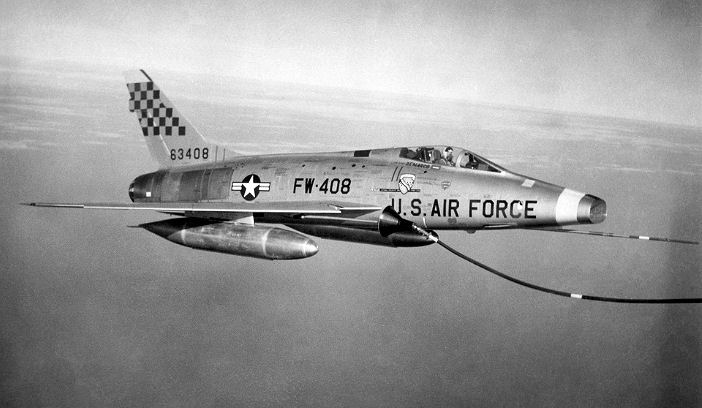
401st Wing F-100D (Note: Aircraft is North American F-100D-85-NH Super Sabre, serial 56-3408. Taken about 1960.)

The squadron was redesignated the 613th Fighter-Bomber Squadron and activated at Alexandria Air Force Base, Louisiana in February 1954. Initially equipped with North American F-86 Sabres, then with Republic F-84F Thunderstreaks, by 1957 the squadron was flying North American F-100 Super Sabres as the 613th Tactical Fighter Squadron. The squadron participated in firepower demonstrations military exercises and maneuvers, and deployed aircraft and personnel to Europe and the Middle East to support NATO. During the Cuban Missile Crisis, the squadron operated from Homestead Air Force Base, Florida. By 1965, however, deployments had begun to the Pacific and Southeast Asia.

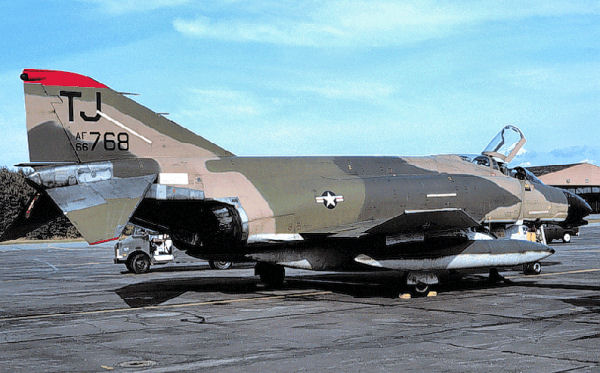
401st Wing F-4 Phantom II at Torrejon (Note: Aircraft is McDonnell F-4C-21-MC, serial 66-7768. This plane was transferred to the Air National Guard in 1984 and sent to the Aerospace Maintenance and Regeneration Center on 3 April 1990. It was sold for scrap on 12 August 1998. Baugher, Joe (29 April 2023). "1966 USAF Serial Numbers". Joe Baugher.)

In April 1966, the squadron moved to Torrejon Air Base, Spain. From Torrejon, the squadron supported NATO by deployments to bases where they maintained an alert status. The squadron continued this operation until it was inactivated in 1991, except for a period in 1970 when it converted to the McDonnell F-4 Phantom II.

== Lineage ==
- Constituted as the 613th Bombardment Squadron (Heavy) on 20 March 1943

Activated on 1 April 1943
Redesignated 613th Bombardment Squadron, Heavy c. 1 November 1943
Inactivated on 28 August 1945

- Redesignated 613th Bombardment Squadron, Very Heavy on 27 December 1946

Activated in the reserve on 10 January 1947
Inactivated on 27 June 1949

- Redesignated 613th Fighter-Bomber Squadron on 24 November 1953

Activated on 8 February 1954
Redesignated 613th Tactical Fighter Squadron on 1 July 1958
Inactivated on 28 June 1991

=== Assignments ===
- 401st Bombardment Group, 1 April 1943 – 28 August 1945
- Tenth Air Force, 10 January 1947
- 401st Bombardment Group, 30 September 1947 – 27 June 1949
- 401st Fighter-Bomber Group, 8 February 1954
- 401st Fighter-Bomber Wing (later Tactical Fighter Wing), 25 September 1957 – 28 June 1991

=== Stations ===
- Ephrata Army Air Base, Washington, 1 April 1943
- Geiger Field, Washington, 4 June 1943
- Great Falls Army Air Base, Montana, 8 July 1943 – 19 October 1943 (deployed to Cut Bank AAF after August)
- RAF Deenethorpe (AAF-128), England, 4 November 1943 – 20 June 1945
- Sioux Falls Army Air Field, South Dakota, c. 1 August 1945 – 28 August 1945
- Brooks Field (later Brooks Air Force Base), Texas, 10 January 1947 – 27 June 1949
- Alexandria Air Force Base (Later England Air Force Base), Louisiana, 8 February 1954
- Torrejon Air Base, Spain, 27 April 1966 – 28 June 1991

=== Aircraft ===
- Boeing B-17 Flying Fortress, 1943–1945
- North American F-86 Sabre, 1954
- Republic F-84F Thunderstreak, 1955–1957
- North American F-100 Super Sabre, 1957–1971
- McDonnell F-4 Phantom II, 1971–1983
- General Dynamics F-16 Fighting Falcon, 1983–1991

=== Awards and campaigns ===
Award streamer	Award	Dates	Notes
	Distinguished Unit Citation	11 January 1944	Germany, 613th Bombardment Squadron
	Distinguished Unit Citation	20 February 1944	Germany, 613th Bombardment Squadron
	Air Force Outstanding Unit Award	13 September 1960–13 October 1960	613th Tactical Fighter Squadron
	Air Force Outstanding Unit Award	1 January 1963–31 December 1963	613th Tactical Fighter Squadron
	Air Force Outstanding Unit Award	11 November 1964–24 Mar 1965	613th Tactical Fighter Squadron
	Air Force Outstanding Unit Award	15 November 1964–15 February 1965	613th Tactical Fighter Squadron
	Air Force Outstanding Unit Award	1 July 1983–30 June 1985	613th Tactical Fighter Squadron
	Air Force Outstanding Unit Award	1 April 1989–31 March 1991	613th Tactical Fighter Squadron

Campaign Streamer	Campaign	Dates	Notes
	Air Offensive, Europe		613th Bombardment Squadron
	Normandy		613th Bombardment Squadron
	Ardennes-Alsace		613th Bombardment Squadron
	Northern France		613th Bombardment Squadron
	Rhineland		613th Bombardment Squadron
	Central Europe		613th Bombardment Squadron

== See also ==
- List of United States Air Force fighter squadrons
- General Dynamics F-16 Fighting Falcon operators
- List of F-4 Phantom II operators
- List of F-100 units of the United States Air Force
- List of F-86 Sabre units
- B-17 Flying Fortress units of the United States Army Air Forces
