= 614th Tactical Fighter Squadron =

Inactive United States Air Force unit

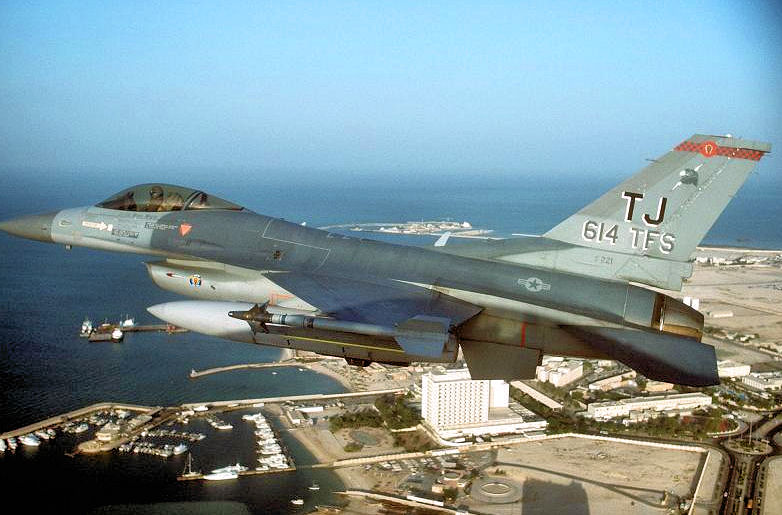
- An F-16C Fighting Falcon of the squadron based at Torrejon AB (Note: Aircraft is General Dynamics F-16C Block 30F Fighting Falcon, serial 87–221. This aircraft was later transferred to the Alabama Air National Guard. Baugher, Joe (2 May 2023). "1987 USAF Serial Numbers". Joe Baugher.)
- Active: 1943–1945; 1947–1949; 1954–1992
- Country: United States
- Branch: United States Air Force
- Role: Tactical fighter
- Nickname: Lucky Devils
- Engagements: European Theater of Operations; Cuban Missile Crisis; Vietnam War; Gulf War
- Decorations: Distinguished Unit Citation; Air Force Outstanding Unit Award

Insignia
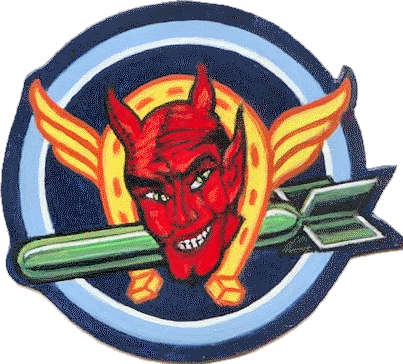
- 614th Tactical Fighter Squadron emblem (Note: Approved 15 November 1943. Description: Over and through a medium blue disc, wide border light turquoise blue, piped white, a winged horseshoe gold with light green aerial bomb crossing beneath the sinister heel and in front of dexter heel, all surmounted by the face and head of a red devil with highlight and shadow. According to Closway the design was originated by Mrs J. J. Casagrande, wife of a squadron navigator. Closway, p. 36)

The 614th Tactical Fighter Squadron is an inactive United States Air Force unit. It was last assigned to the 401st Operations Group at Torrejon Air Base, Spain, where it was inactivated on 1 January 1992.

The squadron was first activated during World War II as the 614th Bombardment Squadron. After training in the United States it moved to England, where it participated in the strategic bombing campaign against Germany. It earned two Distinguished Unit Citations for combat action. Following V-E Day, the squadron was inactivated in England. It was briefly active in the reserves from 1947 to 1949, but does not appear to have been fully manned or equipped.

The squadron was redesignated the 614th Fighter-Bomber Squadron and activated in 1954 at Alexandria Air Force Base, Louisiana. After temporary deployments to Southeast Asia, the squadron moved to Phan Rang Air Base, South Vietnam. It engaged in combat operations until being withdrawn from the theater and moving to Torrejon Air Base, Spain, where it continued fighter operations until being inactivated in 1992, as the Air Force withdrew permanently stationed units from Spain. Shortly before inactivating, its planes and pilots were used to man a provisional organization during Operation Desert Storm.

== History ==
=== World War II ===
==== Organization and training for combat ====
The 614th Bombardment Squadron was activated March 1943 at Ephrata Army Air Base, Washington, as one of the original squadrons of the 401st Bombardment Group. The initial cadre for the squadron was drawn from the 395th Bombardment Group at Ephrata and the 383d Bombardment Group at Rapid City Army Air Field, South Dakota. The cadre soon departed for Orlando Army Air Base, Florida, where they conducted simulated combat missions with the Army Air Forces School of Applied Tactics out of Brooksville Army Air Field.

The ground echelon moved to Geiger Field, Washington, in May 1943 and to Great Falls Army Air Base, Montana, in July. At Great Falls the first combat crews were assigned to the squadron. In the final stage of training the squadrons dispersed with the 614th training at Glasgow Army Air Field.

After completing training the ground echelon left for overseas on 19 October 1943. After staging at Camp Shanks, New York, they embarked on the RMS Queen Mary and sailed on 27 October disembarking at Greenock on the Firth of Clyde on 3 November 1943. The air echelon staged for deployment at Scott Field, Illinois, then flew to England under the control of Air Transport Command via Newfoundland, Iceland and Scotland.

==== Combat in the European Theater ====
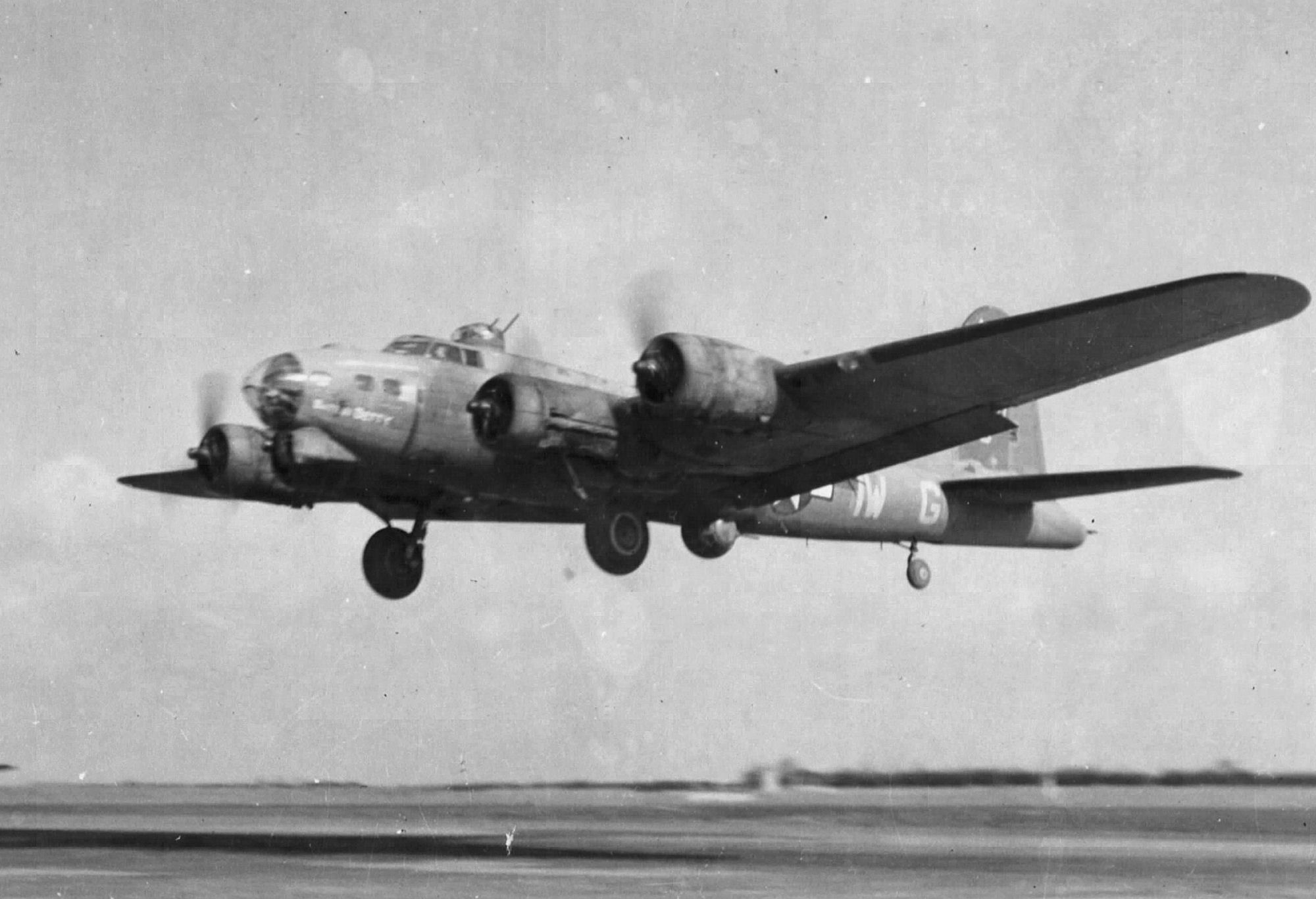
Squadron B-17G Flying Fortress (Note: Aircraft is Lockheed Vega built Boeing B-17G-1-VE Flying Fortress, serial 42-39847 Battlin' Betty. This aircraft was shot down by flak and fighters on the 11 April 1944 mission to bomb the synthetic oil refinery at Politz/Sorau. The entire crew became prisoners of war. Baugher, Joe (28 December 2022). "1942 USAF Serial Numbers". Joe Baugher. Missing Air Crew Report 4016. The photo was taken at RAF Deenethorpe.)

On arrival in England, half of the 401st Group's aircrews were immediately reassigned to the 351st Bombardment Group. The rest of the squadron became part of the Eighth Air Force at RAF Deenethorpe. The 614th became part of the 92d Combat Bombardment Wing of the 1st Bombardment Division. Its tail code was Triangle-S.

On 26 November the 614th flew its first combat mission against Bremen, Germany. The 401st Group did not suffer the combat loss of an airplane until its ninth mission on 30 December. The squadron operated chiefly against strategic targets, bombing industries, submarine facilities, shipyards, missile sites, marshalling yards, and airfields. On 11 January 1944 the squadron was in the lead group of the 1st Bombardment Division in an attack against aircraft manufacturing facilities at Oschersleben, Germany. Although the bombers were able to attack, poor weather conditions prevented the division from receiving effective fighter cover. For over three hours the bomber formation suffered more than 400 attacks by Luftwaffe fighters, including air-to-air rocket attacks. Despite these attacks the unit continued its attack and struck a telling blow against German aircraft production for which the squadron was awarded a Distinguished Unit Citation (DUC).

A little over a month later, on 20 February, the squadron earned its second DUC for an attack on the Erla Maschinenwerke aircraft manufacturing facilities in Leipzig, Germany. Despite fighter attacks and battle damage to the 614th's planes, 100% of the unit's bombs fell within 1,000 feet of the aiming point. Beginning in October 1944, the unit concentrated its attacks on Axis oil reserves.

In addition to strategic missions, squadron operations included attacks on transportation, airfields, and fortifications to support Operation Overlord, the Normandy invasion. On D-Day the 614th attacked Normandy beachhead areas dropping bombs five minutes before troops landed. The following month it provided close air support for Operation Cobra, the breakthrough at Saint-Lô, it also supported the siege of Brest in August and Operation Market Garden in September. During the Battle of the Bulge in December 1944 and January 1945, the unit attacked transportation and communications in the battle area. It supported airborne forces involved in Operation Varsity, the airborne assault across the Rhine in March 1945.

The squadron flew its last combat mission on 20 April 1945 against Brandenberg. It had flown 254 combat missions from Deenethorpe airfield. After V-E Day, the squadron flew missions to Linz, Austria, to evacuate British and French prisoners of war. It also flew Trolley sightseeing missions at low level, flying ground support personnel over the Ruhr and Frankfurt am Main to see the damage that had been done as a result of their efforts.

The unit was alerted for redeployment to the Pacific Theater and the last plane departed Deenethorpe in early June. The ground echelon sailed on the RMS Queen Elizabeth on the fifth. Upon arrival in the US, personnel were granted thirty days leave, reassembling at Sioux Falls Army Air Field, South Dakota, but plans had changed and personnel were either transferred to Boeing B-29 Superfortress units or processed for discharge and the squadron was inactivated.

=== Reserve operations ===
The squadron was activated at Brooks Field (later Brooks Air Force Base), Texas in January 1947 as a unit of the reserves. It trained under the supervision of the 178th AAF Base Unit (later 2593d Air Force Reserve Training Center) of Air Defense Command (ADC). It is not clear whether or not the squadron was fully staffed or equipped. In 1948, Continental Air Command assumed responsibility for managing reserve and Air National Guard units from ADC. President Truman's reduced 1949 defense budget required reductions in the number of units in the Air Force, and the 613th was inactivated in June.

=== Fighter operations ===
==== Tactical Air Command ====
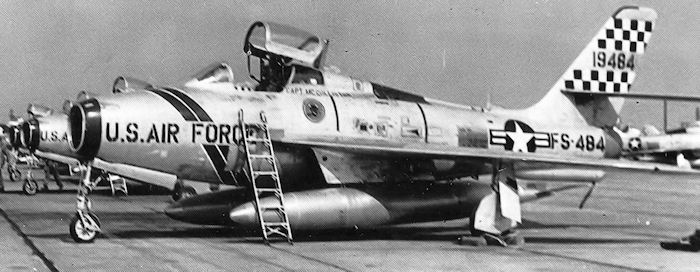
401st Group F-84F Thunderstreak (Note: Closest aircraft is Republic F-84F Thunderstreak, serial 51-9484. This plane was transferred to the Illinois Air National Guard in 1957, but was returned to the regular air force in 1963 to equip the 15th Tactical Fighter Wing until it received McDonnell F-4C Phantom IIs. Baugher, Joe (6 May 2023). "1951 USAF Serial Numbers". Joe Baugher.)

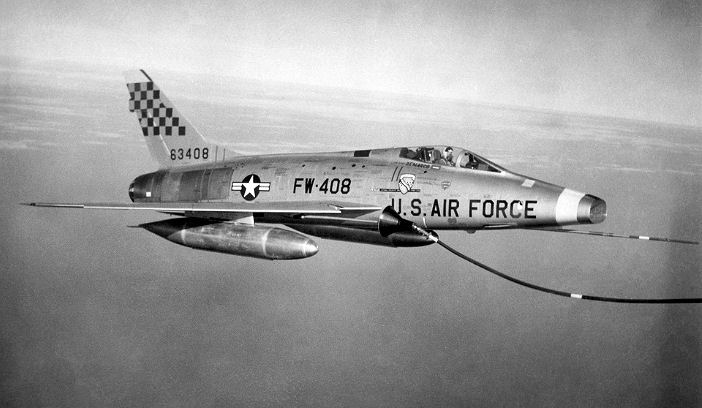
Squadron F-100D Super Sabre (Note: Aircraft is North American F-100D-85-NH Super Sabre, serial 56-3408. Taken about 1960.)

The squadron was redesignated the 614th Fighter-Bomber Squadron and activated at Alexandria Air Force Base, Louisiana in February 1954. Initially equipped with North American F-86 Sabres, then with Republic F-84F Thunderstreaks, by 1957 the squadron was flying North American F-100 Super Sabres as the 614th Tactical Fighter Squadron. The squadron participated in firepower demonstrations military exercises and maneuvers. It also deployed aircraft and personnel to Europe and the Middle East to support NATO. During the Cuban Missile Crisis, the squadron operated from Homestead Air Force Base, Florida. By 1965, however, deployments had begun to the Pacific and Southeast Asia.

An F-4 Phantom II from Torrejón Air Base, Spain, receives fuel in flight from a U.S. Air Force tanker

==== Combat in Vietnam ====
In the spring of 1966, the squadron's parent wing moved to Torrejon Air Base, Spain, but the squadron remained at England Air Force Base until September, when it moved to Phan Rang Air Base, in the Republic of Vietnam, where it was assigned to the 366th Tactical Fighter Wing. Shortly after the squadron's arrival at Phan Rang, the 366th Wing moved on paper to Da Nang Air Base, and the 35th Tactical Fighter Wing became the squadron's new headquarters. The squadron continued combat operations in Vietnam until the 35th Wing stood down from combat on 26 June 1971.

==== Operations in Europe and the Middle East ====
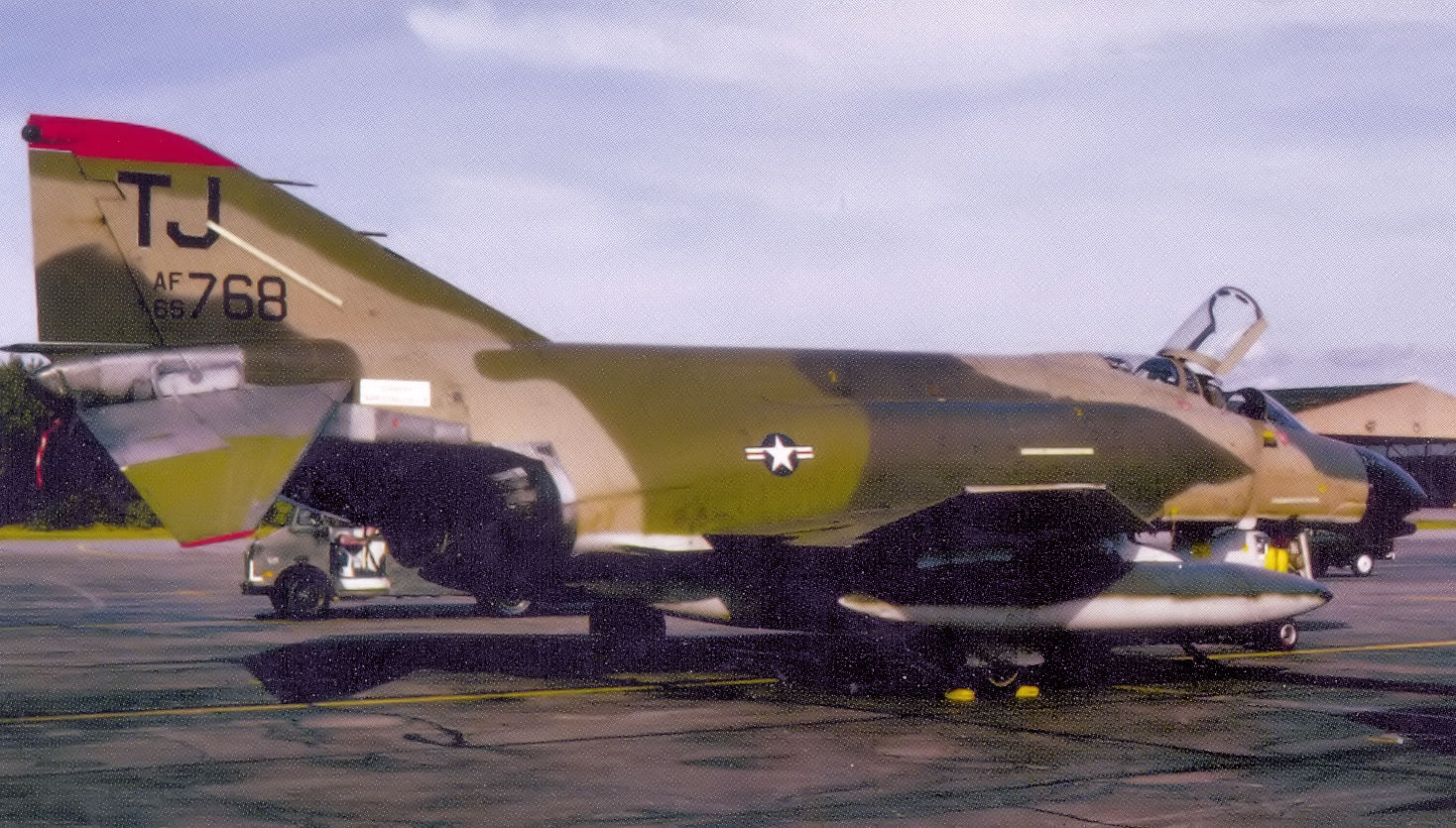
Squadron F-4D Phantom II (Note: Aircraft is McDonnell F-4D-31-MC Phantom II, serial 66-7768 at Torrejon Air Base, Spain, in 1978. This plane was transferred to the Air National Guard c. 1985. It was retired to the Aerospace Maintenance and Regeneration Center on 3 April 1990 and sold for scrap on 12 August 1998. Baugher, Joe (29 April 2023). "1966 USAF Serial Numbers". Joe Baugher.)

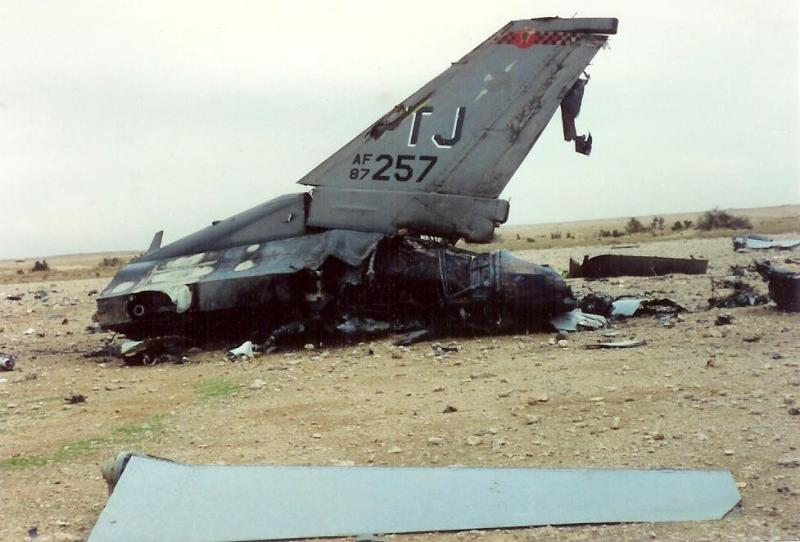
Remains of squadron F-16 shot down during Operation Desert Storm. (Note: Aircraft is General Dynamics F-16C, Block 30F, serial 87-0257. Baugher, Joe (2 May 2023). "1987 USAF Serial Numbers". Joe Baugher. The wreckage was discovered by US forces during Desert Storm and the canopy was found by US forces during Operation Iraqi Freedom. The canopy and photos are now part of a display at the Pima Air and Space Museum)

The squadron moved on paper to rejoin the 401st Wing at Torrejon in July 1971, replacing the 353d Tactical Fighter Squadron and assuming its personnel and McDonnell F-4 Phantom IIs. The squadron deployed to advanced locations in Europe and the Middle East, where it stood alert status. it deployed its forces to Doha International Airport, Qatar in 1990, where they formed the 614th Tactical Fighter Squadron (Provisional). It flew 1,303 sorties into Iraq and Kuwait, delivering 3.7 million pounds of ordnance. It was the first USAF unit to ever deploy to Qatar. It was inactivated in 1992 as the United States removed its combat units permanently stationed in Spain.

== Lineage ==
- Constituted as the 614th Bombardment Squadron (Heavy) on 20 March 1943

Activated on 1 April 1943
Redesignated 614th Bombardment Squadron, Heavy c. 1 November 1943
Inactivated on 28 August 1945

- Redesignated 614th Bombardment Squadron, Very Heavy on 27 December 1946

Activated in the reserve on 10 January 1947
Inactivated on 27 June 1949

- Redesignated 614th Fighter-Bomber Squadron on 24 November 1953

Activated on 8 February 1954
Redesignated 614th Tactical Fighter Squadron on 1 July 1958
Inactivated on 1 January 1992

=== Assignments ===
- 401st Bombardment Group, 1 April 1943 – 28 August 1945
- Tenth Air Force, 10 January 1947
- 401st Bombardment Group, 30 September 1947 – 27 June 1949
- 401st Fighter-Bomber Group, 8 February 1954
- 401st Fighter-Bomber Wing (later 401st Tactical Fighter Wing), 25 September 1957
- 834th Air Division, 27 April 1966
- 366th Tactical Fighter Wing, 18 September 1966
- 35th Tactical Fighter Wing, 10 October 1966
- 401st Tactical Fighter Wing, 15 July 1971 – 1 January 1992

=== Stations ===
- Ephrata Army Air Base, Washington, 1 April 1943
- Geiger Field, Washington, 4 June 1943
- Great Falls Army Air Base, Montana, 8 July 1943 – 19 October 1943 (deployed to Glasgow AAF after August)
- RAF Deenethorpe (AAF-128), England, 4 November 1943 – 20 June 1945
- Sioux Falls Army Air Field, South Dakota, c. 1–28 August 1945
- Brooks Field (later Brooks Air Force Base), Texas, 10 January 1947 – 27 June 1949
- Alexandria Air Force Base (later England Air Force Base), Louisiana, 8 February 1954
- Phan Rang Air Base, Republic of Vietnam, 18 September 1966
- Torrejon Air Base, Spain, 15 July 1971 – 1 January 1992

=== Aircraft ===
- Boeing B-17 Flying Fortress, 1943–1945
- North American F-86 Sabre, 1954–1955
- Republic F-84F Thunderstreak, 1954–1957
- North American F-100 Super Sabre, 1957–1971
- McDonnell F-4 Phantom II, 1971–1983
- General Dynamics F-16 Fighting Falcon, 1983–1991

=== Awards and campaigns ===
Award streamer	Award	Dates	Notes
	Distinguished Unit Citation	11 January 1944	Germany 614th Bombardment Squadron
	Distinguished Unit Citation	20 February 1944	Germany 614th Bombardment Squadron
	Presidential Unit Citation	10 October 1966–10 April 1967	614th Tactical Fighter Squadron
	Air Force Outstanding Unit Award with Combat "V" Device	3 September 1967–2 May 1968	614th Tactical Fighter Squadron
	Air Force Outstanding Unit Award with Combat "V" Device	1 October 1968–13 April 1969	614th Tactical Fighter Squadron
	Air Force Outstanding Unit Award with Combat "V" Device	14 April 1969–13 April 1970	614th Tactical Fighter Squadron
	Air Force Outstanding Unit Award with Combat "V" Device	1 December 1970–25 June 1971	614th Tactical Fighter Squadron
	Air Force Outstanding Unit Award	1 January 1963–31 December 1963	614th Tactical Fighter Squadron
	Air Force Outstanding Unit Award	5 August 1964–7 November 1964	614th Tactical Fighter Squadron
	Air Force Outstanding Unit Award	8 August 1964–15 November 1964	614th Tactical Fighter Squadron
	Air Force Outstanding Unit Award	1 July 1984–30 June 1985	614th Tactical Fighter Squadron
	Air Force Outstanding Unit Award	1 April 1989–31 March 1991	614th Tactical Fighter Squadron
	Vietnamese Gallantry Cross with Palm	18 September 1966–25 June 1971	614th Tactical Fighter Squadron

Campaign Streamer	Campaign	Dates	Notes
	Air Offensive, Europe	4 November 1943 – 5 June 1944	614th Bombardment Squadron
	Normandy	6 June 1944 – 24 July 1944	614th Bombardment Squadron
	Northern France	25 July 1944 – 14 September 1944	614th Bombardment Squadron
	Ardennes-Alsace	16 December 1944 – 25 January 1945	614th Bombardment Squadron
	Rhineland	15 September 1944 – 21 March 1945	614th Bombardment Squadron
	Central Europe	22 March 1945 – 21 May 1945	614th Bombardment Squadron
	Vietnam Air Offensive	18 September 1966 – 8 March 1967	614th Tactical Fighter Squadron
	Vietnam Air Offensive, Phase II	9 March 1967 – 31 March 1968	614th Tactical Fighter Squadron
	Vietnam Air/Ground	22 January 1968 – 7 July 1968	614th Tactical Fighter Squadron
	Vietnam Air Offensive, Phase III	1 April 1968 – 31 October 1968	614th Tactical Fighter Squadron
	Vietnam Air Offensive, Phase IV	1 November 1968 – 22 February 1969	614th Tactical Fighter Squadron
	Tet 1969/Counteroffensive	23 February 1969 – 8 June 1969	614th Tactical Fighter Squadron
	Vietnam Summer-Fall 1969	9 June 1969 – 31 October 1969	614th Tactical Fighter Squadron
	Vietnam Winter-Spring 1970	3 November 1969 – 30 April 1970	614th Tactical Fighter Squadron
	Sanctuary Counteroffensive	1 May 1970 – 30 June 1970	614th Tactical Fighter Squadron
	Southwest Monsoon	1 July 1970 – 30 November 1970	614th Tactical Fighter Squadron
	Commando Hunt V	1 December 1970 – 14 May 1971	614th Tactical Fighter Squadron
	Commando Hunt VI	15 May 1971 – 15 July 1971	614th Tactical Fighter Squadron

== See also ==
- List of United States Air Force fighter squadrons
- General Dynamics F-16 Fighting Falcon operators
- List of F-4 Phantom II operators
- List of F-100 units of the United States Air Force
- List of F-86 Sabre units
- B-17 Flying Fortress units of the United States Army Air Forces
