= 45th Wing =

- Ala 45
- Active: 1956 – present
- Country: Kingdom of Spain
- Branch: Spanish Air and Space Force
- Type: Wing
- Role: VIP, Air transport, air-to-air refuelling, MEDEVAC
- Part of: General Air Command
- Home station: Torrejón Air Base
- Mottos: Cansándonos de acertar (Spanish for 'Tired of getting it right')
- Aircraft: See Fleet overview
- Flying hours: 150,000 (2009)
- Website: Web site

The 45th Wing (Spanish: Ala 45), until 2025 known as 45th Air Force Group, is a wing of the Spanish Air and Space Force responsible for air transportation of the Spanish royal family, the prime minister and high-ranking government officials. In addition, it also transports personnel and material on international missions of the Spanish Armed Forces, as well as performing aerial refueling.

The unit is based in Torrejón Air Base, 24 kilometres (15 mi) away from Madrid.

== Fleet overview ==
Currently, the 45th Group fleet is composed by 2 customized Airbus A310 in service since 2003 and 5 Dassault Falcon 900 in service since 2004. Since 2021, this unit also operates 3 Airbus A330 MRTT.

Photo	Aircraft	No. of Aircraft	Introduced	Notes
	Airbus A310	2	2003	One is intended for transportation of the Monarch and his family and the other for the transportation of the Prime Minister and other government ministers.
	Dassault Falcon 900	5	1988	Short range travel of the royal family and government officials.
	Airbus A330 MRTT	3	2021	Transportation of material, personnel and aerial refueling.

== Helicopters ==
The VIP transport by helicopter is not responsibility of the 45th Wing, this task is carried out by the 402th Air Force Squadron, which is part of the 48th Wing.

== See also ==
- Air transports of heads of state and government
