= Getafe Air Base =

Military airbase near Madrid, Spain

Getafe Air Base Base Aérea de Getafe
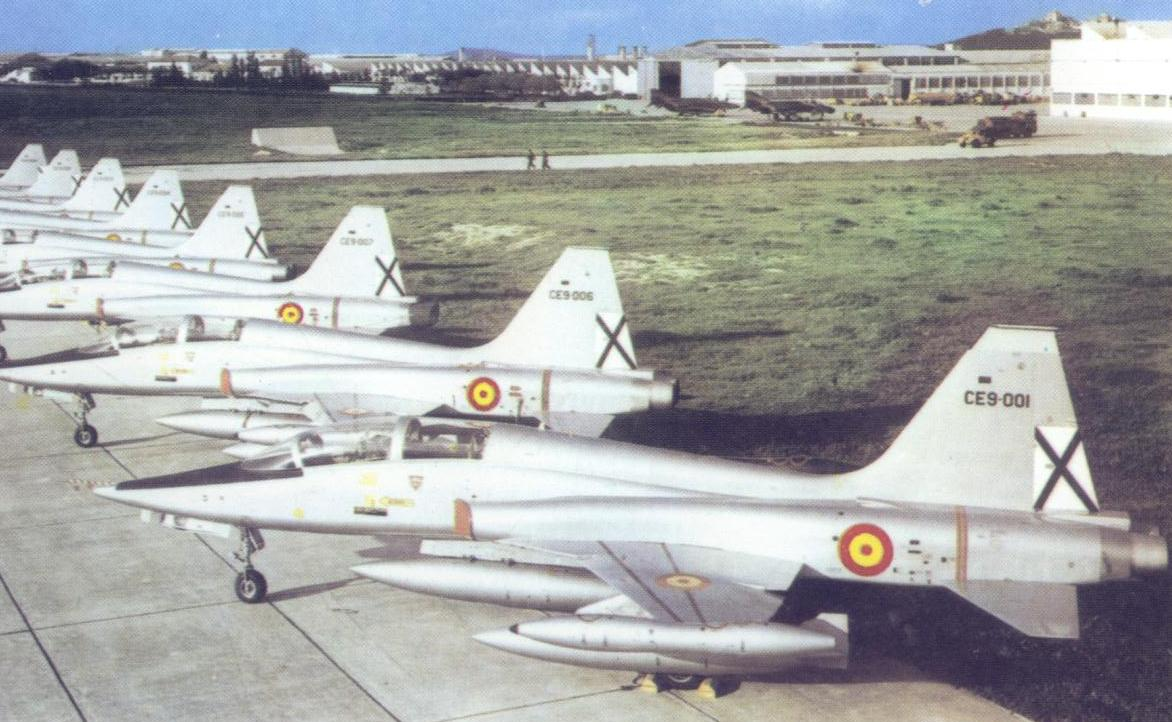
- IATA: none; ICAO: LEGT

Summary
- Airport type: Military
- Operator: Spanish Air and Space Force
- Location: Getafe, Spain
- Built: 1911
- Elevation AMSL: 620 m (2,030 ft)
- Coordinates: 40°17′45″N 3°43′30″W
- Interactive map of Getafe Air Base

Runways
Direction	Length		Surface
Direction	ft	m	Surface
05/23	8,136	2,480	Asphalt

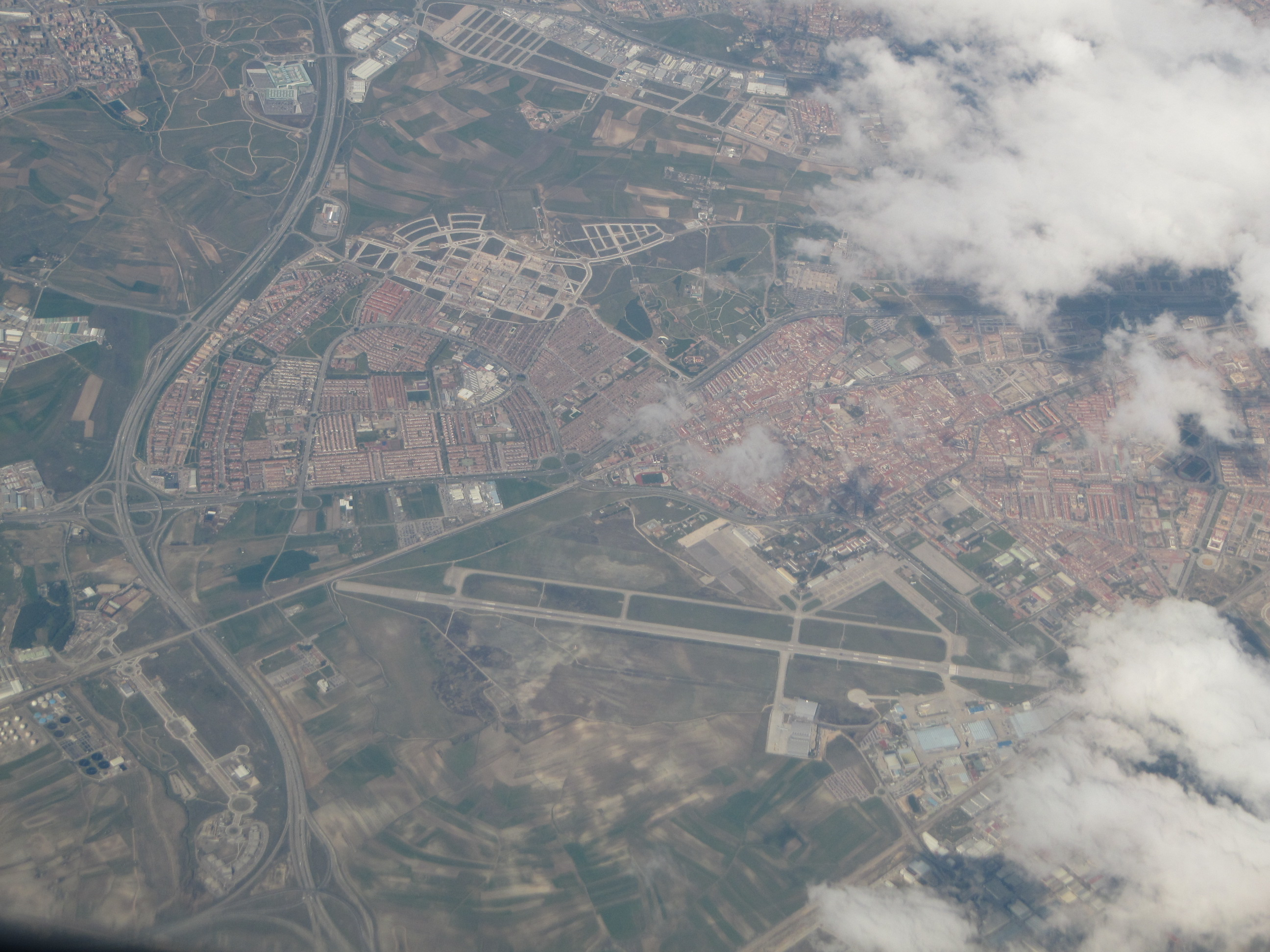
Aerial photograph

Air Bases of the Spanish Air and Space Force

Getafe Air Base (ICAO: LEGT) is a military airbase located in Getafe, 14 km south of Madrid, Spain. The air base, at an altitude of 620 m above sea level, has a single runway with a length of 3.06 km. It was one of the first military air bases in Spain and, because of that, is considered the "cradle" of Spanish aviation.

The base was inaugurated in 1911 (20 years before Madrid Barajas International Airport) and two years later the Civil Aviation School was created. It was the first air bases in Spain where the first autogyro was flown its designer Juan de la Cierva.

This air base was established permanently in 1911 (20 years before Barajas), and two years later the Civil Aviation School was created. Since then, the extensions and reforms of the same have happened to this day.

== Civil use ==
Today, apart from military use, the factory that belonged to CASA and is currently part of the European group EADS CASA is located next to the base, and next to a railway line. In another factory next to the base, the Spanish Eurofighter Typhoons are assembled. In an annexed facility, the Eurofighter Typhoon destined for Spain are assembled. CASA also carries out in the facilities attached to the base the maintenance of various aircraft of the Air and Space Force, as well as programs for the improvement and modernization of these aircraft.

Through an agreement signed with the Getafe City Council, the Infante de Orleans Foundation, which maintains a collection of old aircraft in flight, will soon move its facilities to land near the Base, from whose aeronautical facilities it will become a user for its flights and its exhibitions. monthly flights.

Given the possibility of closing, increasingly remote, the Madrid-Cuatro Vientos Airport (civil), there have been several proposals for the creation of a civil aerodrome for general aviation and a terminal for low-cost airplanes, over the land of the Getafe Air Base. This proposal has always had the opposition of the City of Getafe, which does not want to increase the pollution that entails the heavy traffic of a civil airport. However, the Getafe City Council has always been a firm supporter of the maintenance of the EADS-CASA facilities and the Air Base of the Air and Space Force, which it sees as complementary and responsible for the industrial-aeronautical fabric of the city.

== Garrison ==
The main military unit to operate from Getafe is the "Ala 35" transport wing, which operates CASA/IPTN CN-235 (two units for VIP missions, eighteen units for transport) and EADS CASA C-295 (nine units for transport).

In 2008, most CN-235s moved to other Spanish Air Force bases and a second squadron of C-295s was formed. Several other units have also been placed at Getafe including the Cartographic Center's fleet from Cuatro Vientos Air Base a few kilometers from Getafe itself.
