= Madrid–Torrejón Airport =

Airport serving Madrid, Spain

Madrid–Torrejón Airport Aeropuerto de Madrid–Torrejón
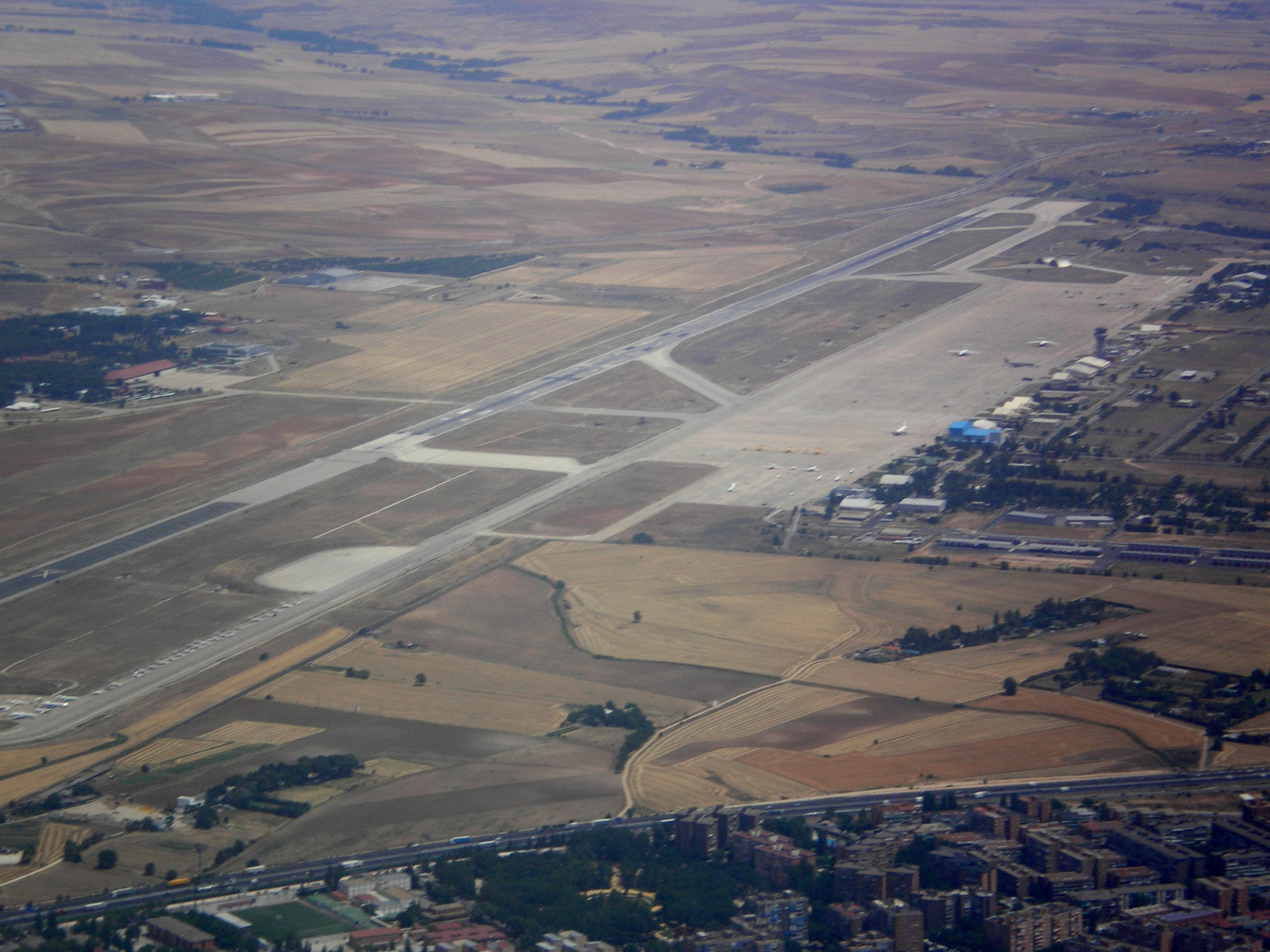
- IATA: TOJ; ICAO: LETO

Summary
- Airport type: Public / Military
- Owner: Spanish Air and Space Force (Ejército del Aire y del Espacio)
- Operator: AENA
- Serves: Madrid metropolitan area
- Passenger services ceased: 1 February 2013
- Built: 1 June 1957; 69 years ago
- Elevation AMSL: 618 m / 2,026 ft
- Coordinates: 40°29′48″N 003°26′45″W
- Website: aena-aeropuertos.es

Map
- Location within Spain

Runways
Direction	Length		Surface
Direction	m	ft	Surface
04/22	4,818	15,807	Asphalt
- Sources: Spanish AIP at EUROCONTROL

Madrid–Torrejón Airport (IATA: TOJ, ICAO: LETO) is a commercial airport in central Spain, a joint-use facility between the Spanish Ministry of Defence and the Ministry of Public Works. The civil part is dedicated primarily to executive and private aviation. The military part (Torrejón Air Base) is the base of several combat, logistics, and electronic warfare units of the Ejército del Aire y del Espacio, the Spanish Air and Space Force, among them the 12 Combat Wing with F-18 fighters and the official planes of the President of the Government and the King of Spain. It is also the base of the European Union's Satellite Centre (EUSC).

The airport was formerly home to U.S. Air Force squadrons at Torrejón Air Base and is located fifteen miles (24 km) northeast of Madrid, five miles (8 km) west of Alcalá de Henares, and one mile (1.6 km) NE of Torrejón de Ardoz.

== History ==
As the time approached in 1987 for the renegotiation of the existing base agreement, which had entered into force in 1983 for a five-year period, pressures mounted for a reduction of the United States military presence in Spain. Communist political groups and elements of the PSOE had campaigned against the bases. Moreover, the base agreement had become a symbol of United States cooperation with the former Spanish State. It was important to many Spaniards to eliminate vestiges of this history by converting Spain's long-standing bilateral relations with the United States into a multilateral undertaking through NATO.

The outcome of the 1986 referendum on membership in NATO committed the Spanish government to negotiate the reduction of the United States military presence in Spain. Spain insisted that the F-16 aircraft be removed from Torrejón as a condition for renewal of the base agreement, and the Spanish government threatened to expel all United States forces in Spain if this demand were not accepted. The United States felt that the Spanish military contribution was minimal and the Spanish government was permitting domestic factors to dictate a weakening of NATO defenses. Even though Italy subsequently agreed to station the F-16 wing at Aviano Air Base, the cost of transfer would be high, and the unit would be in a more exposed position to Warsaw Pact forces.

In January 1988, Spain and the United States announced jointly that agreement had been reached in principle on a new base agreement with an initial term of eight years, essentially meeting the conditions demanded by Spain. The F-16s were to be removed from Torrejón within three years, by mid-1991. It was expected that this step would reduce the number of United States personnel in Spain by nearly one-half.

Implementation of this agreement was delayed by the 1990–91 crisis in Kuwait, when the 401st TFW was one of the first American fighter wings to respond, with the 612th TFS deploying to its wartime base at Incirlik Turkey and the 614th TFS becoming the first US military unit to deploy to the Persian Gulf State of Qatar. Both squadrons flew numerous operational missions during Operations Desert Shield and Desert Storm.

After the 1991 cease-fire in Iraq, plans proceeded to close Torrejón Air Base. On 28 June, the 613th TFS was inactivated and its aircraft sent to Air National Guard squadrons in the United States. The 612th TFS inactivated on 1 October, and the 614th TFS on 1 January 1992.

In accordance with the 1988 agreement, the USAF portion of the base was returned to the Spanish government on 21 May 1996, with the 401st Tactical Fighter Wing being transferred to Aviano Air Base, Italy without personnel or equipment.
