= Torrejón Air Base =

Spanish Air and Space Force air base

- Base Aérea de Torrejón
- Near Torrejón de Ardoz, Comunidad de Madrid in Spain
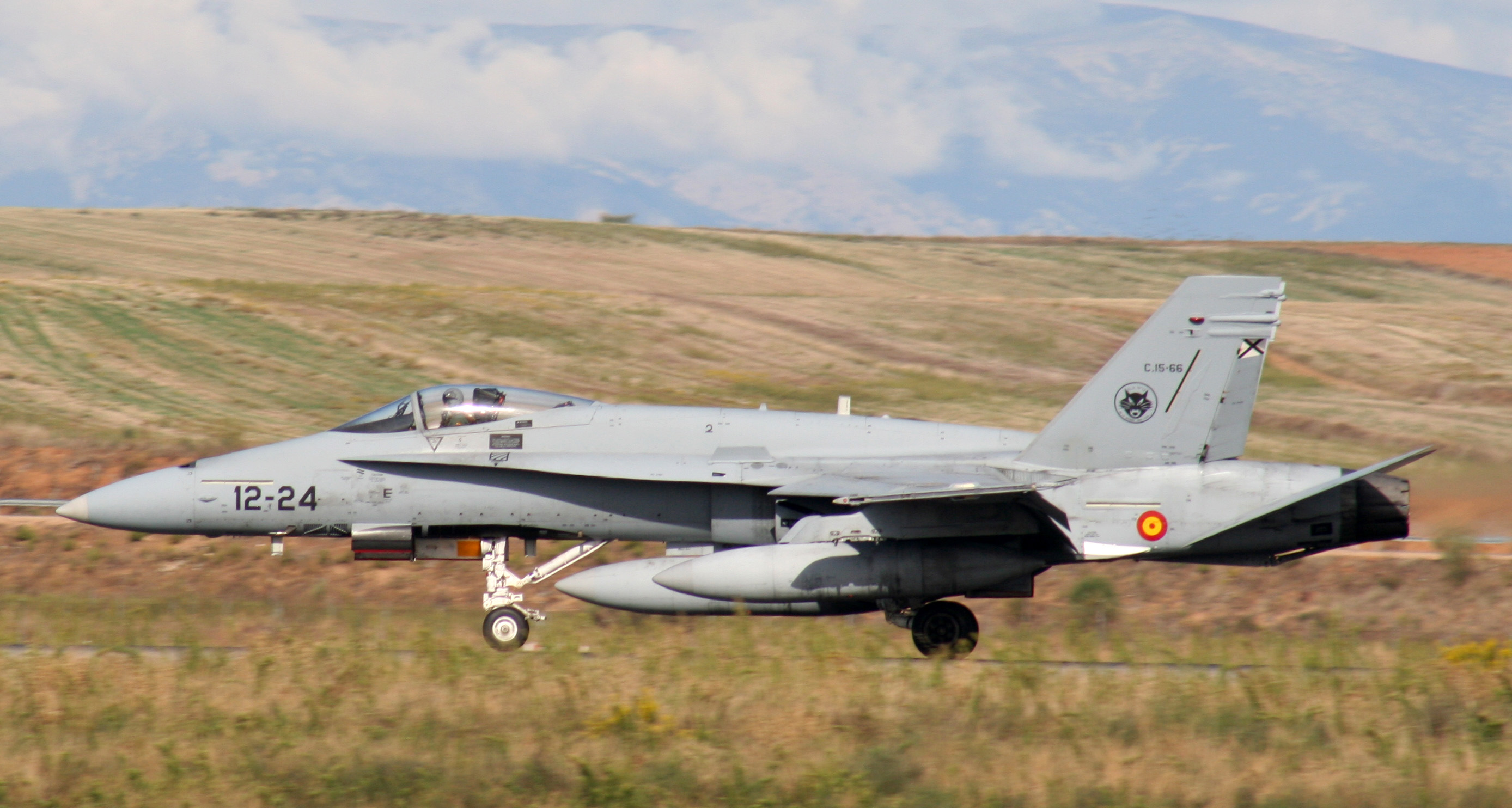
- A Spanish Air and Space Force EF-18A Hornet at Torrejón

Site information
- Type: Military airfield
- Owner: Ministry of Defence
- Operator: Spanish Air and Space Force
- Controlled by: General Air Command
- Condition: Operational
- Website: Official website (in Spanish)

Location
- Location in Spain Location in Europe
- Coordinates: 40°29′48″N 003°26′45″W

Site history
- Built: 1957
- In use: 1957 – present

Garrison information
- Garrison: Torrejón Air Base Group

Airfield information
- Identifiers: IATA: TOJ, ICAO: LETO, WMO: 082270
- Elevation: 618 metres (2,028 ft) AMSL
Runways
Direction	Length and surface
04/22	3,658 metres (12,001 ft) Asphalt

Torrejón Air Base (IATA: TOJ, ICAO: LETO) (Base Aérea de Torrejón de Ardoz) is both a major Spanish Air and Space Force base and the co-located Madrid–Torrejón Airport, a secondary civilian airport for the city and metropolitan area of Madrid, east-northeast of the city center in central Spain.

== History ==
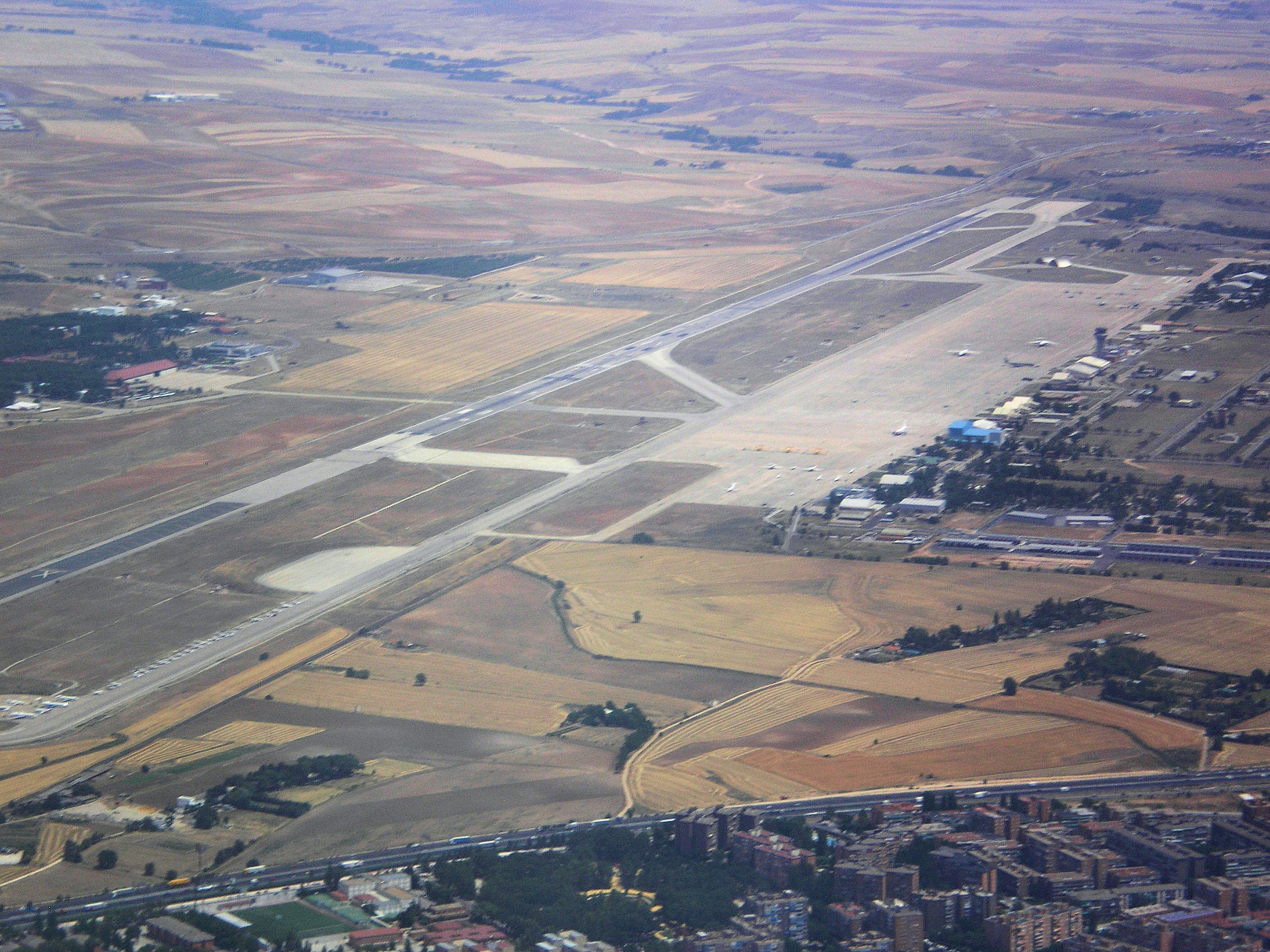
Aerial view of Torrejón Air Base

Torrejón Air Base was originally the home of the National Institute for Aerospace Technology. Following the signing of the Pact of Madrid of 26 September 1953, construction began on a new 13,400-foot (4,100 m) concrete runway to replace the existing 4,266-foot (1,300 m) grass airstrip and on a massive concrete apron and other necessary maintenance and shelter facilities to accommodate the largest United States Air Force (USAF) bomber aircraft in the Strategic Air Command (SAC) inventory, with the base intended to support SAC Operation Reflex missions. This was the longest runway in Europe until the construction of the Ulyanovsk Vostochny Airport in 1983, and is the seventh longest runway in Europe as of 1 January 2026.

USAF support activities began under the 7600th Air Base Group located in Madrid in July 1956, to support construction and base organizational functions. Torrejón Air Base opened officially on 1 June 1957 with SAC activating the 3970th Strategic Wing on 1 July 1957. The base hosting Sixteenth Air Force as well as SAC's 65th Air Division (Defense) where it cooperated with Spanish Air Force units in the Air Defense Direction Centers (ADDC). The 65th Air Division directed base construction and the establishment of off-base housing and radar sites. The division's fighter squadrons flew air defense interceptions over Spanish airspace. The division also controlled the operations of numerous attached tactical fighter squadrons that were deployed to Spain for temporary duty (TDY). Assigned or attached units of the division participated in numerous exercises with the Spanish Air Defense Command, and in some instances, with the U.S. Sixth Fleet.

In addition to the command and control mission, Torrejón Air Base hosted SAC Reflex operations. Reflex operations consisted of rotating B-47 Stratojet wings overseas for extended duty as part of a dispersal program. Another reason for establishing Reflex bases was the relatively short range of the B-47, unlike the intercontinental range of the B-36 Peacemaker and B-52 Stratofortress which could remain based permanently in the United States. Also, in this way SAC could spread out its potential as a Soviet target by placing its aircraft, weapons, and personnel on many more bases, with each bombardment wing having two additional installations to which it could disperse.

On 5 July 1958 the Air Defense Command's 497th Fighter-Interceptor Squadron arrived at Torrejón from Geiger AFB, Washington. It had an air defence role with North American F-86 Sabres. On 26 April 1960, the 497th FIS transitioned to the F-102 Delta Dagger and operated under SAC control until its transfer to the United States Air Forces in Europe (USAFE) 86th Air Division (Defense) at Ramstein Air Base West Germany on 1 July 1960. This transfer was made in order that all USAF fighter assets in Europe could be concentrated in one command. It operated F-102s until 3 June 1964, when it was reassigned to the 8th Tactical Fighter Wing at George AFB, California. Its F-102 aircraft were transferred to other USAFE 86th AD FIS squadrons.

=== Tactical operations ===
With the phaseout of the B-47 from SAC in the mid-1960s, the need for SAC European bases diminished. The Sixteenth Air Force was turned over to USAFE on 15 April 1966 and the strategic focus changed to tactical. Prior to 1966, Torrejón AB hosted TDY squadrons of tactical aircraft rotating from Continental U.S. Tactical Air Command (TAC) bases which would perform 30-day rotations to Aviano Air Base Italy and Incirlik Air Base, Turkey.

With the USAFE takeover of the base, TAC transferred the 401st Tactical Fighter Wing from England Air Force Base, Louisiana to USAFE on a permanent basis to Torrejón on 27 April 1966, to perform host functions at the base and to support the rotational TDY duty to Italy and Turkey for NATO alerts.

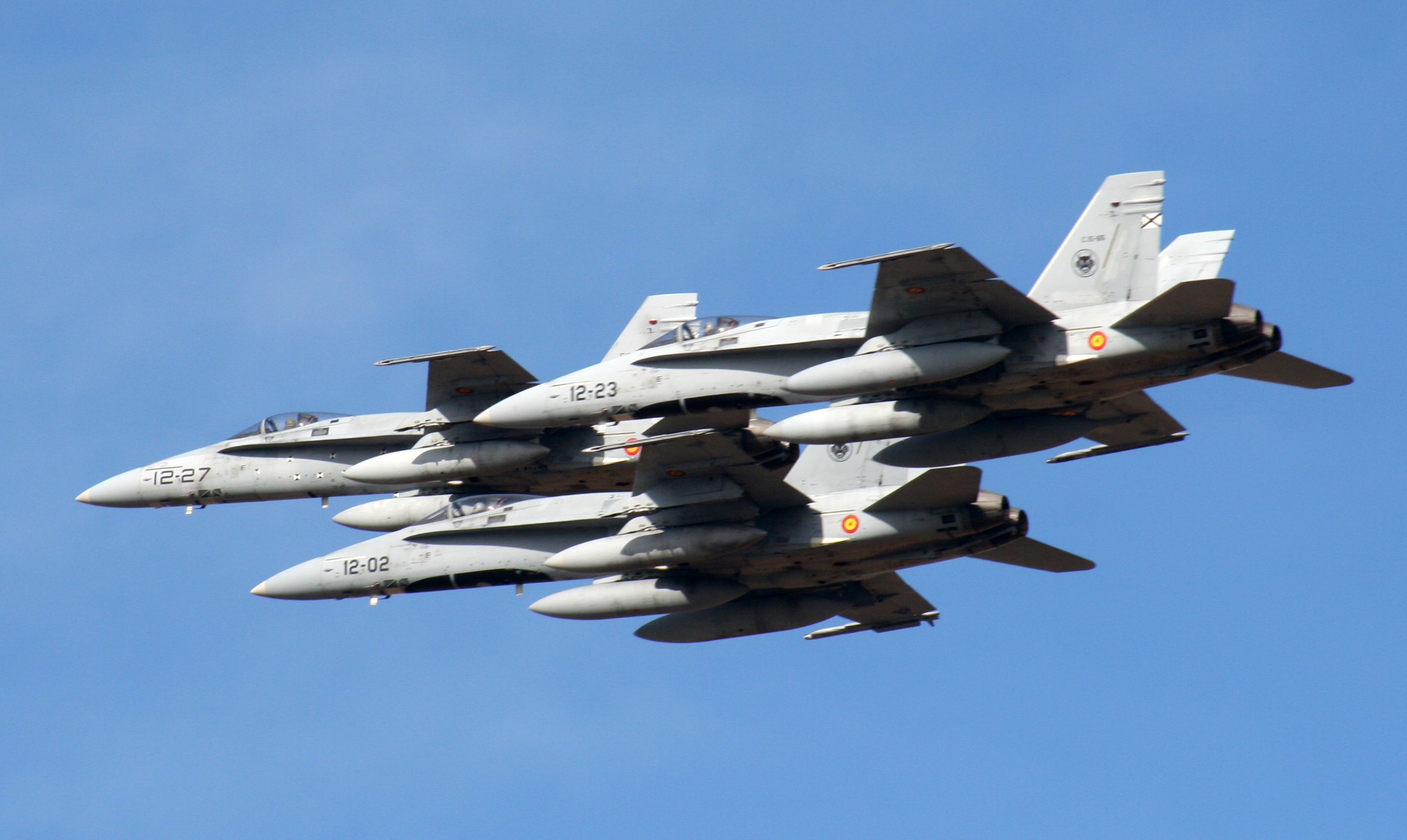
Three EF-18 of the Ala 12 at Torrejón

The 401st TFW's initial operational squadrons at Torrejón were:

- 307th Tactical Fighter Squadron (1966–1971) (Tail Code: TJ)
- 353d Tactical Fighter Squadron (1966–1971) (Tail Code: TK)
- 613th Tactical Fighter Squadron (1966–1993) (Yellow/Black Tails, Tail Code: TJ)

401st TFW squadrons flew the North American F-100D/FSuper Sabre.

Due to the demands of the Vietnam War, the 401st had deployed two of its three permanently assigned fighter squadrons (612th, 614th) to South Vietnamese bases (Phan Rang AB and Phu Cat AB). To provide the 401st a full operational capability at Torrejón, aircraft and personnel were transferred on a permanent basis to the 401st TFW from Homestead AFB, Florida (307th TFS) and Myrtle Beach AFB South Carolina (353d TFS).

As well as the USAFE tactical aircraft, SAC retained a presence at Torrejón with the 98th Strategic Wing flying KC-135 Stratotankers from the base. The 98th SW replaced the 3970th Strategic Wing on 25 June 1966. The 98th SW was inactivated at Lincoln Air Force Base Nebraska that same day with the closure of Lincoln AFB.

The 98th SW had no permanently assigned aircraft assigned, however CONUS-based SAC wings deployed aircraft to provide air refueling sup-port to meet the operational, alert, and exercise commitments of SAC, TAC, USAFE, and NATO in an area including the eastern Atlantic, most of Europe, North Africa and the Middle East.

Even though neither were assigned to the base, when a B-52 and a KC-135 crashed off the coast of Spain in the 1966 Palomares B-52 crash, Torrejón became the focal point for the search for the missing nuclear weapons.

Military Airlift Command (MAC) operated the 625th Military Airlift Support Squadron at Torrejón to function as a major terminal for MAC transatlantic flights.

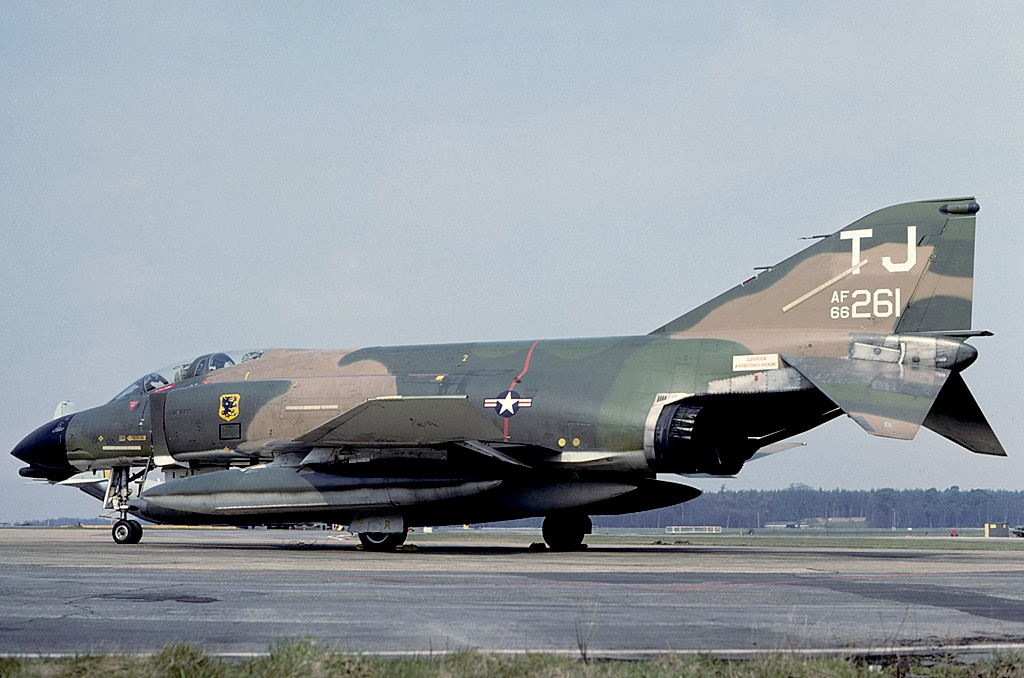
McDonnell F-4D Phantom II, 401st TFW 'TJ' Torrejón, photographed at RAF Woodbridge, UK, 1979

In 1970 the 401st TFW upgraded to the McDonnell Douglas F-4 Phantom II. In September 1973, an equipment change to the F-4C model took place, then in 1979 to the F-4D.

As a result of the withdrawal of USAF forces in South Vietnam, on 15 July 1971 the 307th and 353rd TFS were returned to their home bases, and the 612th and 614th TFSs were assigned to Torrejón. Also in 1972, individual squadron tail codes were eliminated and "TJ" became the tail code for all 401st TFW aircraft.

On 31 December 1976 the 98th Strategic Wing was inactivated with its air refueling mission being taken over by the 306th Strategic Wing, based at Ramstein Air Base, West Germany.

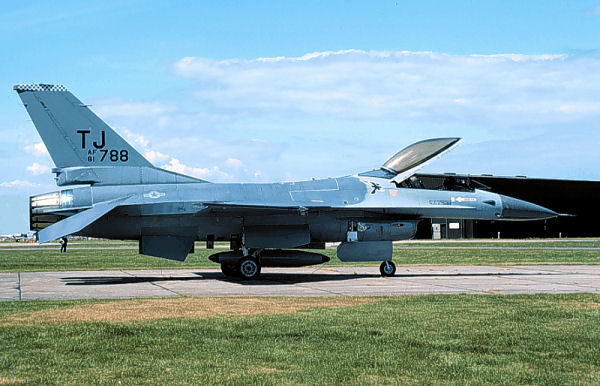
General Dynamics F-16A Block 15H Fighting Falcon Serial 81-0788 of the 612th TFS. After the 401st was transferred from Torrejón, this aircraft was sent to AMARC in 1996

The 401st transitioned to the new General Dynamics Block 15 F-16A/B Fighting Falcon beginning with the first aircraft deliveries on 5 February 1983. The wing reached full F-16 operational capability on 1 January 1985. The F-16A/B models were upgraded to the Block 30 F-16C/D beginning in late 1987, with all aircraft replaced by September 1988.

Operational squadrons were:

- 612th Tactical Fighter Squadron (blue tail stripe)
- 613th Tactical Fighter Squadron (yellow tail stripe)
- 614th Tactical Fighter Squadron (red tail stripe)

=== USAF withdrawal ===
As the time approached in 1987 for the renegotiation of the existing base agreement, which had entered into force in 1983 for a five-year period, pressures mounted for a reduction of the United States military presence in Spain. Communist political groups and elements of the Spanish Socialist Workers' Party (PSOE) had campaigned against the bases. Moreover, the base agreement had become a symbol of United States cooperation with Francoist Spain. It was important to many Spaniards to eliminate vestiges of this history by converting Spain's long-standing bilateral relations with the United States into a multilateral undertaking through NATO.

The outcome of the 1986 Spanish NATO membership referendum committed the Spanish government (then the Second González government) to negotiate the reduction of the United States military presence in Spain. Spain insisted that the F-16 aircraft be removed from Torrejón as a condition for renewal of the base agreement, and the Spanish government threatened to expel all United States forces in Spain if this demand were not accepted. The United States felt that even though Italy subsequently agreed to station the F-16 wing at Aviano Air Base, the cost of transfer would be high, and the unit would be in a more exposed position to Warsaw Pact forces.

In January 1988, Spain and the United States announced jointly that agreement had been reached in principle on a new base agreement with an initial term of eight years, essentially meeting the conditions demanded by Spain. The F-16s were to be removed from Torrejón within three years, by mid-1991. It was expected that this step would reduce the number of United States personnel in Spain by nearly one-half.

Implementation of this agreement was delayed by the 1990-91 crisis in Kuwait, when the 401st TFW was one of the first American fighter wings to respond, with the 612th TFS deploying to its wartime base at Incirlik, Turkey and the 614th TFS becoming the first US military unit to deploy to Qatar. Both squadrons flew a large number of operational missions during Operations Desert Shield and Desert Storm.

After the 1991 cease-fire in Iraq, plans proceeded to close Torrejón Air Base. On 28 June, the 613th TFS was inactivated and its aircraft sent to Air National Guard squadrons in the United States. The 612th TFS inactivated on 1 October and the 614th TFS on 1 January 1992.

In accordance with the 1988 agreement, the USAF portion of the base was turned over to the Spanish government on 21 May 1992, with the 401st Tactical Fighter Wing being transferred to Aviano Air Base, Italy without personnel or equipment.

=== Civilian use ===
In the mid-1990s Torrejón Air Base was opened to civilian traffic (mostly charter and executive traffic) and was given the name Madrid–Torrejón Airport. Prior to the completion of Barajas Terminal 4 it was used on several occasions to reduce congestion at the old overloaded Barajas terminals. Operated by Aena, in 2011 it handled 27,801 passengers and 11,489 flight operations. Beginning February 1, 2013, Torrejón-Madrid Airport was permanently closed to all civilian and general aviation traffic.

=== Current military use ===
Since its creation, Torrejón Air Base was also the base of a Spanish Air Force fighter wing, an aerial firefighting group and the flight test group of the Spanish Air Force (Ala 12 of the Spanish Air Force, the 54 Flight Test Group and the 43 Group dedicated to aerial firefighting). Currently the Ala 12 of the Spanish Air Force operates two squadrons equipped with the McDonnell Douglas F/A-18 Hornet, the 54 Flight Test Group operates with a very diverse range of airplanes and the 43 Grupo operates with Bombardier 415 and Canadair CL-215. In order to fill the space left by the withdrawal of USAF, the Spanish Air Force moved into Torrejón Air Base the following units that were not based there before: the 45th Wing (Ala 45) dedicated to VIP transport and the 47 Grupo dedicated to electronic warfare.

== Based units ==
Flying and notable non-flying units based at Torrejón.

=== Spanish Air and Space Force ===
Air Combat Command

- Headquarters Air Combat Command
- Command and Control System Headquarters
  - Central Command and Control Group
- Aerospace Surveillance and Control System
  - Headquarters Aerospace Surveillance and Control System
  - Space Surveillance Operations Center

General Air Command

- Wing 12
  - 121 Squadron – C.15/CE.15 (EF-18A/B Hornet)
  - 122 Squadron – C.15/CE.15 (EF-18A/B Hornet)
- 43 Air Force Group UME (Military Emergencies Unit – Search and Rescue & Forest Fires Unit)
  - 431 Squadron – UD.13T (CL-215T) and UD.14 (CL-415)
  - 432 Squadron – UD.13T (CL-215T) and UD.14 (CL-415)
- 45 Air Force Group (Royal, Government & VIP Transport)
  - 451 Squadron – T.18 (Falcon 900) and T.22 (A310)
- 47 Joint Group of Air Forces (Reconnaissance, Electronic Warfare, Transport, In-flight Refuelling)
  - 471 Squadron – T.17 (Boeing 707)
  - 472 Squadron – T.12 (C-212 Aviocar) and TM.11 (Falcon 20)
- Aeroevacuation Medical Unit
- Armament and Experimentation Logistics Center – C.15/CE.15 (EF-18A/B Hornet), E.25 (C-101EB Aviojet) and T.12 (C-212 Aviocar)
- Center for Aerospace Observation Systems – Helios
- Deployment Support Air Medical Unit
- Intendancy Logistics Center
- Madrid Salvage Coordination Center (RCC Madrid)
- School of Aeronautical Techniques
- Transmission Group
  - Transmission Squadron No. 5

Personnel Command

- Aerospace Medicine Instruction Center

Other

- Air Operations Squadron No. 1 – Madrid
- Operational Air Circulation Group
- Military Emergency Unit
- Space Surveillance Operations Center

=== Civil Guard ===
- Civil Guard Air Service

=== European Union ===
European Union Satellite Center

- Headquarters European Union Satellite Centre

=== NATO ===
NATO Communications and Information Agency

- Communications and Information Systems Support Unit Torrejón

Supreme Headquarters Allied Powers Europe

- Allied Air Command
  - Combined Air Operations Centre Torrejón
