= Robert Coverdale =

Robert Coverdale may refer to:

- Robert Coverdale (footballer) (1892–1959), English footballer
- Robert F. Coverdale (1930–2020), United States Air Force general
- Bob Coverdale (1928–2009), English rugby league player
