= William G. Moore Jr. =

United States Air Force general

William Grover Moore Jr.
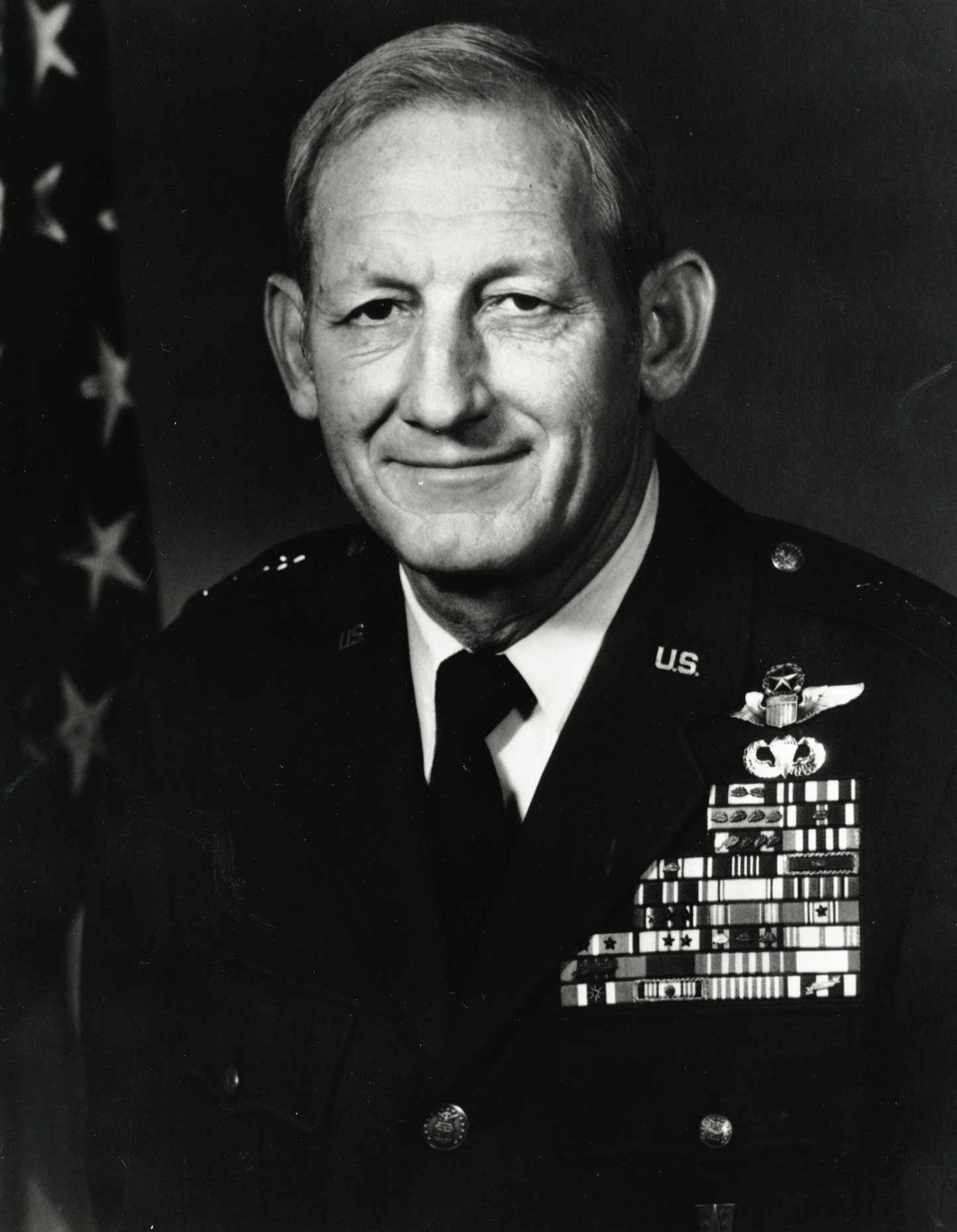
- General William G. Moore Jr., CINC, Military Airlift Command
- Born: May 18, 1920; Waco, Texas
- Died: March 18, 2012 (aged 91); Huntsville, Alabama
- Military career
- Allegiance: United States
- Branch: United States Air Force
- Service years: 1941–1979
- Rank: General
- Commands: 777th Bombardment Squadron; 3rd Bombardment Group; 314th Troop Carrier Wing; 839th Air Division; Rapid Strike; 834th Air Division; Twenty-Second Air Force; Thirteenth Air Force; Pacific Command
- Conflicts: World War II; Cold War; Korean War; Vietnam War

William Grover Moore Jr. (May 18, 1920 – March 18, 2012) was a general in the United States Air Force and the former commander-in-chief of Military Airlift Command. Moore was a combat veteran with 100 missions flown during World War II and the Korean War, and more than 140 missions in the Vietnam War.

== Biography ==
=== World War II ===
Moore was born in Waco, Texas, in 1920, and began his military career in 1940 by enlisting in the Army Air Corps as an aviation cadet. He graduated in May 1941 with a commission as a second lieutenant.

During World War II, Moore commanded the 777th Bombardment Squadron, 464th Bombardment Group, Fifteenth Air Force, in Italy, logging 35 combat missions in B-24 Liberators. After World War II, he served as commandant of students at the Army Air Forces Aircraft Observer and Bombardier School at Mather Field, California.

=== Korean War ===
During the Korean War, he commanded the 3rd Bombardment Group based at Kunsan Air Base, from where he led 65 combat missions in Douglas B-26 Invader medium bombers.

From January 1953 to August 1956, he served at Headquarters United States Air Force, Washington D.C., in the Directorate of Operations, and from August 1957 to 1961 he was assigned to Headquarters United States Air Forces in Europe, where he served as assistant deputy chief of staff, operations. He entered the National War College, Washington D.C., in August 1961.

In August 1962 Moore began his airlift career as commander of the 314th Troop Carrier Wing, Sewart Air Force Base, Tennessee. During this time he also completed airborne training at Fort Benning, Georgia. In September 1963 he became commander of the 839th Air Division. While at Sewart, he directed Project Close Look, the springboard for today's tactical airlift tactics and procedures, and served as airlift commander on several large-scale exercises, including the Big Lift deployment to Europe.

=== Vietnam War ===
From March 1965 until October 1966, Moore was the deputy director of operations, J-3, United States Strike Command at MacDill Air Force Base, Florida, where he commanded the test airlift exercise Rapid Strike and was instrumental in much of the airlift planning for joint operations.

In November 1966, was assigned in Vietnam to organize the airlift effort in support of the Vietnam War. He reactivated and commanded the 834th Air Division at Tan Son Nhut Air Base, with responsibility for all tactical airlift in Vietnam.

In December 1967 he assumed duties as director of operational requirements and development plans, deputy chief of staff, research and development, Headquarters United States Air Force.

In February 1970 he became commander of the Twenty-Second Air Force (Military Airlift Command) at Travis Air Force Base, California. There he had prime responsibility for the extensive strategic airlift flown from the continental United States to Southeast Asia. During this time, he also flew more than 900 hours in the C-141 Starlifter. While he was Twenty-Second Air Force commander, the world's largest aircraft, the C-5 Galaxy, entered the Military Airlift Command inventory and a C-5 squadron was activated at Travis.

In September 1972 Moore assumed command of the Thirteenth Air Force at Clark Air Base in the Philippines, known as the Jungle Air Force. He was responsible for United States Air Force units in Taiwan, Thailand and the Republic of the Philippines. C-130 Herculeses under his command were the first aircraft into Hanoi to prepare for returning prisoners of war, and he commanded the homecoming operation at Clark Air Base under the direction of the commander in chief, Pacific Command.

General Moore was assigned as chief of staff, Pacific Command, in October 1973. He participated in the planning and execution of numerous missions: complex airlift efforts for resupply of Cambodia; evacuation of Phnom Penh (Operation Eagle Pull) and Saigon (Operation Frequent Wind); Operation Babylift; Operation New Life; and the Mayaguez operation.

=== Later career ===
He became assistant Vice Chief of Staff United States Air Force, with the additional duty of senior Air Force member, Military Staff Committee, United Nations, in October 1976. The Senate confirmed his presidential nomination to the grade of general and he assumed his present duty on April 1, 1977.

=== Retirement ===
After he retired, he worked for the Metropolitan Nashville Airport Authority, eventually becoming president where he directed the planning, development, financing and operation of the Nashville International Airport, Smyrna Airport, John C. Tune General Aviation Airport, and the Springfield Airport. Under Moore's leadership, the authority greatly expanded the Nashville Airport. He and his wife also lived in Franklin, Tennessee. Moore was charitably active in his later life and was rewarded with the 1990 Fred Russell Distinguished American Award, 1990 Barry Dean Fulton Award from United Cerebral Palsy of Middle Tennessee; 1993 Outstanding Nashvillian of the Year by Kiwanis Nashville; and 1996 Citizen of the Year by Easter Seals Tennessee. Moore died in Huntsville, Alabama on March 18, 2012, of natural causes. A graveside service with full military honors was to take place at the United States Air Force Academy on April 2, 2012.

== Awards ==
Awards earned during his career:

- Defense Distinguished Service Medal
- Air Force Distinguished Service Medal with two oak leaf clusters
- Silver Star
- Legion of Merit with five oak leaf clusters
- Distinguished Flying Cross with two oak leaf cluster
- Air Medal with nine oak leaf clusters
- Joint Service Commendation Medal
- Air Force Commendation Medal with an oak leaf cluster
- Croix de Guerre with a palm
- Distinguished Service Order, 2d Class
- Vietnamese Armed Forces Honor Medal, 1st Class with a cluster

In 1997 he was inducted into the Airlift/Tanker Association Hall of Fame.
