= 834th Airlift Division =

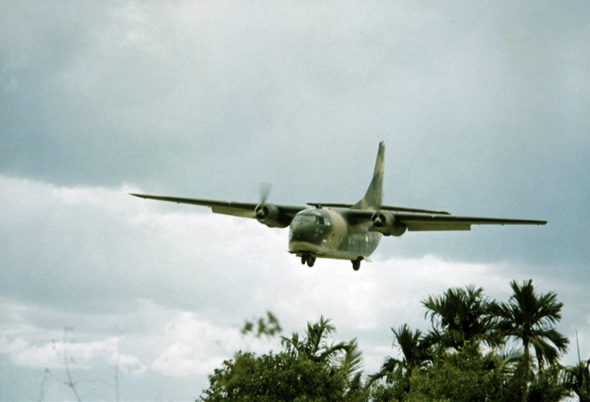
- C-123 Provider landing at Bien Hoa AB
- Active: 1957–1959; 1964–1971; 1972–1974; 1978–1992
- Country: United States
- Branch: United States Air Force
- Role: Command of airlift forces
- Motto: All the Way
- Engagements: Vietnam War
- Decorations: Presidential Unit Citation; Air Force Outstanding Unit Award with Combat V Air Force Outstanding Unit Award; Vietnamese Gallantry Cross with Palm

Commanders
- Notable commanders: Gen William G. Moore Jr. Lt Gen Robert F. Coverdale (Note: In addition, Brig Gens Mears and Kondra and Col Trzaskoma all later reached the rank of lieutenant general.)

Insignia
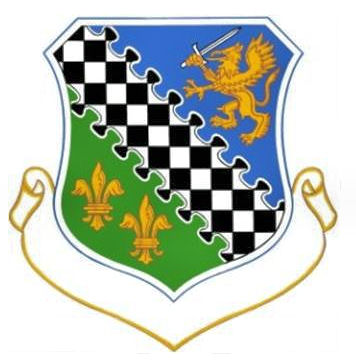
- 834th Airlift Division emblem (Note: Approved 30 March 1965. Description: On a field divided azure and vert, a bend nebuly checky sable and argent fimbriated of the last [color mentioned] between a griffin rampant or garnished brown grasping in dexter talon a sword bend sinister wise of the fourth [color mentioned] garnished of the third [color mentioned], and two fleurs de lis in bend of the fifth [color mentioned] garnished of the sixth [color mentioned], all within a diminished bordure of the fourth [color mentioned].)

The 834th Airlift Division is an inactive United States Air Force organization. Its last assignment was with Military Airlift Command, assigned to Twenty-Second Air Force at Hickam Air Force Base, Hawaii, where it was inactivated on 1 April 1992.

The division was first activated in September 1957 at England Air Force Base, Louisiana to command the two fighter-bomber wings stationed there and act as the host organization for England, providing support for all units on the station. It was inactivated in April 1959 when the 366th Tactical Fighter Wing was also inactivated, leaving only a single wing at England. Its support organizations were replaced by organizations assigned to the 401st Tactical Fighter Wing.

The division was activated again in 1964, when England once again supported two fighter wings. However, by 1966, the division's units had deployed overseas, primarily to support the War in Vietnam. By the summer of 1966, the division was stripped of its manning. In October, the 834th transferred on paper to Tan Son Nhut Airport, where it assumed responsibility for controlling all airlift in South Viet Nam.

The 834th was assigned two wings flying Fairchild C-123 Providers and de Havilland Canada C-7 Caribous and controlled Lockheed C-130 Hercules rotated to Vietnam from wings stationed elsewhere. The division earned two Presidential Unit Citations and an Air Force Outstanding Unit Award with Combat "V" Device for its actions, as well as being decorated by the Government of the Republic of Viet Nam. One member of the division, Lt Col Joe M. Jackson, was awarded the Medal of Honor for rescuing a combat control team left behind when an airfield being overrun by the Viet Cong was evacuated.

As American forces were being withdrawn from Vietnam, the division moved to Little Rock Air Force Base, Arkansas and assumed command of tactical airlift wings located in the western portion of the United States. In December 1974, the division was transferred to Military Airlift Command (MAC) along with other theater airlift units. One month later, it was inactivated and its units transferred to Twenty-Second Air Force.

The division returned to the Pacific in 1978 as the 834th Airlift Division when it assumed responsibility for MAC assets in the Pacific and acted as the airlift adviser for Pacific Air Forces (PACAF). During Desert Storm its commander acted as the commander of airlift forces in Saudi Arabia. The 834th was inactivated when PACAF assumed responsibility for airlift in the Pacific from MAC.

== History ==
=== England Air Force Base ===
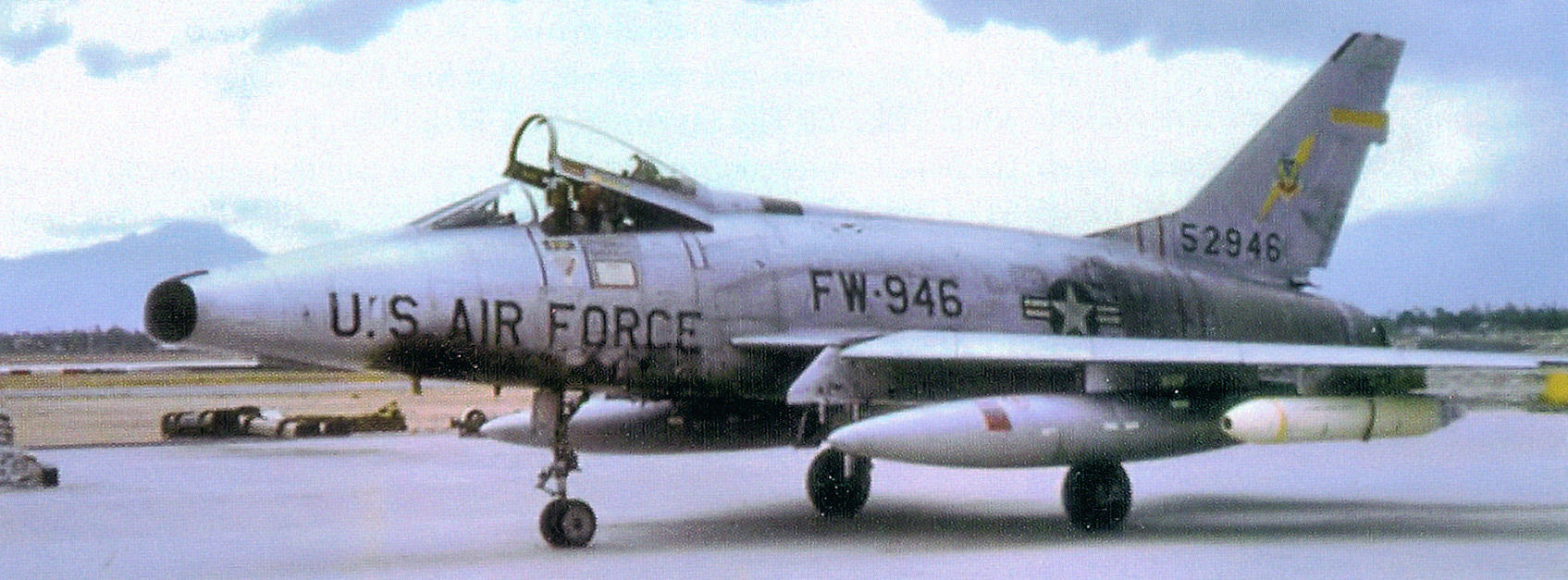
F-100D of the 401st Tactical Fighter Wing (Note: Aircraft is North American F-100D-45-NH Super Sabre serial 55-2946 of the 615th Tactical Fighter Squadron, taken while deployed to Da Nang Air Base, Vietnam. This plane crashed near Torrejon Air Base on 16 May 1967.)

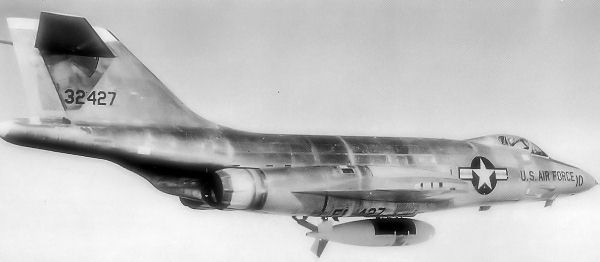
F-101A of the 27th Tactical Fighter Wing (Note: Aircraft is McDonnell F-101A-5-MC Voodoo, serial 53-2427. This plane was converted to JF-101A, but was written off on while still at the McDonnell Aircraft factory on 25 August 1958. Baugher, Joe (5 August 2023). "1953 USAF Serial Numbers". Joe Baugher. It is shown carrying a Mk-7 nuclear weapon.)

The division was first activated in September 1957 at England Air Force Base, Louisiana and assumed command over the 366th Fighter-Bomber Wing and the newly activated 401st Fighter-Bomber Wing. Both wings were converting from the Republic F-84 Thunderstreak to the North American F-100 Super Sabre when they were assigned to the 834th. The 366th Wing also had an air refueling squadron flying Boeing KB-50 Superfortress tankers attached to it. The 834th also assumed host responsibility for England through its 834th Air Base Group, which assumed the personnel and equipment of the inactivating 366th Air Base Group to support all units at England. The division supervised operations and training, exercises, firepower demonstrations, and insured the combat readiness of aircrews and equipment. It initially emphasized attaining a capability to deliver nuclear weapons, while also maintaining a secondary air defense capability.

The division was only active at England for a little more than eighteen months, inactivating in April 1959 when the 366th Wing inactivated, leaving only a single wing at England. However, as Tactical Air Command (TAC) reorganized its Numbered Air Forces from a functional basis to a regional commands, the division saw its higher headquarters shift from Ninth Air Force to Eighteenth Air Force to Twelfth Air Force within its first three months as an active unit. In July 1958, the 27th Tactical Fighter Wing, flying McDonnell F-101 Voodoos from Bergstrom Air Force Base, Texas was attached to the division. The 27th was winding up operations as the tactical fighter version of the Voodoo was leaving TAC's inventory and TAC was transferring Bergstrom to the control of Strategic Air Command. In February 1959, the 27th was relieved from this attachment when it ceased operations at Bergstrom and transferred on paper to Cannon Air Force Base, New Mexico.

In 1965, TAC began forming the 3d Tactical Fighter Wing with F-100 aircraft at England. With two wings again assigned to the base, the 834th was reactivated and resumed host responsibility for the base. The 31st Tactical Fighter Wing at Homestead Air Force Base, Florida was also assigned to the division. However, the focus of the division and its component wings focused more and more on the War in Vietnam. All three wings deployed squadrons to Vietnam, and in November, the 3d Wing moved to Bien Hoa Air Base to conduct combat operations.

In late April 1966, the remaining fighter wing at England, the 401st, was transferred to Torrejon Air Base, Spain and in August, the 31st Tactical Fighter Wing at Homestead was reassigned to the 836th Air Division, while all support activities at England were reassigned to the 1st Air Commando Wing, which had moved to England in January, leaving the 834th without a mission.

=== Vietnam War ===
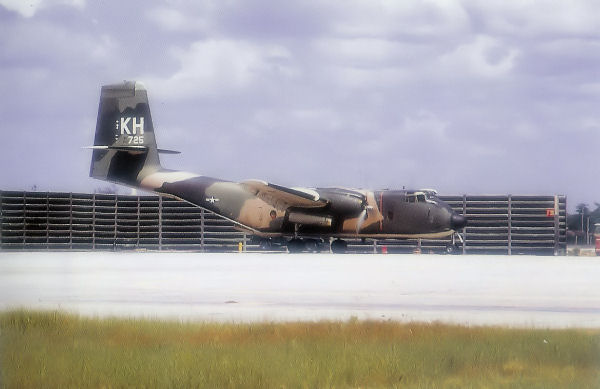
C-7B of the 483d Tactical Airlift Wing (Note: Aircraft is De Havilland Canada CV-2B (later C-7B) Caribou, serial 63-9725 of the 535th Tactical Airlift Squadron at Cam Ranh Bay Air Base, South Vietnam, taken in October 1971. This aircraft was later transferred to the South Vietnamese 427th Transport Squadron.)

On 15 October 1966 the 834th moved without personnel or equipment to Tan Son Nhut Air Base, South Vietnam, to become the controlling agency for theater airlift operations in South Vietnam. It served as a single manager for all tactical airlift operations in South Vietnam, using air transport to haul cargo and troops, which were air-landed or air-dropped, as combat needs dictated. The division included the 315th Air Commando Wing, which operated Fairchild C-123 Providers, and the 483rd Troop Carrier Wing, which activated the same date the division moved in October 1966 as the parent unit for former US Army de Havilland Canada C-7 Caribous which had transferred to the Air Force. The division also included the 2nd Aerial Port Group, which moved to Tan Son Nhut from Tachikawa Air Base, Japan.

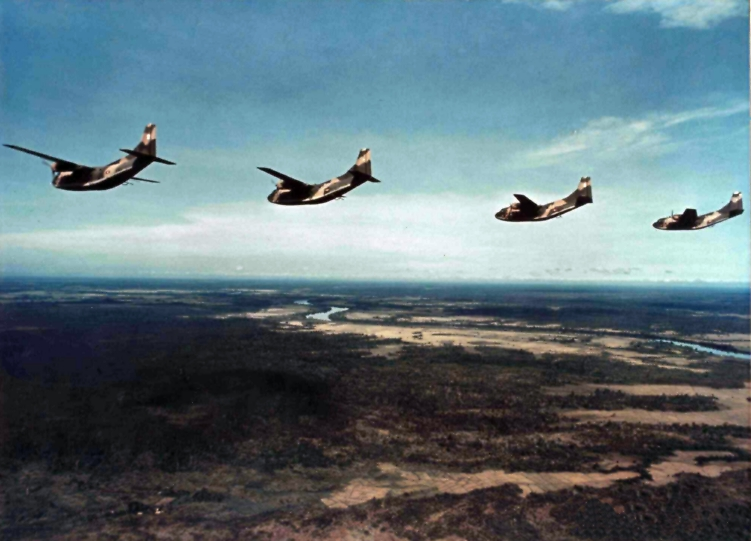
UC-123B Ranch Hand aircraft

In addition, 834th had operational control over 315th Air Division Lockheed C-130 Hercules assigned on temporary duty in South Vietnam. (Note: The C-130s rotated to Vietnam from the 314th Tactical Airlift Wing at Ching Chuan Kang Air Base (CCK), Taiwan; the 374th Tactical Airlift Wing at Naha Air Base, Okinawa (until May 1971 when it replaced the 314th Wing at CCK) and the 463d Tactical Airlift Wing at Mactan Island Airfield until July 1968, when it moved to Clark Air Base, Philippines. Ravenstein, pp. 162, 197, 257.) PACAF was reluctant to permanently station C-130s in Vietnam because of the additional support personnel required in an area with a mandated troop ceiling and crowded bases and the flexibility that would be lost in scheduling the planes, which provided airlift throughout the western Pacific. Detachment 1 of the 834th Division controlled C-130s operating from Tan Son Nhut while Detachment 2 controlled operations from Cam Ranh Bay Air Base. These replaced Detachments 4 and 5 of the 315th Air Division and were joined by Detachment 3 at Tuy Hoa Air Base by 1968. In addition, the 834th supervised transport operations (primarily Douglas C-47 Skytrains) of the Vietnamese Air Force and a squadron of the Royal Australian Air Force (No. 35 Squadron RAAF). (Note: The Australians operated six A-4 Wallaby transports, the Australian model of the C-7 Caribou.) The 834th's 315th Wing also performed defoliation missions.

About one third of the division's strength was in the 2d Aerial Port Group, which had three subordinate squadrons with cargo handling detachments at 42 locations in Vietnam The 2d Aerial Port Group also contained combat control teams and mobility teams that could be deployed to remote locations as needed. (Note: See Nalty, pp. 53–55 for the use of these teams during the Siege of Khe Sanh.) Prior to the movement of the 834th to Vietnam, the 315th Wing had been performing the aerial port mission.

In early 1967, C-130s under the division's control participated in the largest American airborne assault of the war, Operation Junction City, an assault on Viet Cong forces in War Zone C. On 22 February 1967, C-130s massed at Bien Hoa Air Base onloaded troopers and equipment of the 173rd Airborne Brigade and parachuted them into drop zones near Ca Tum, close to the Cambodian border.

The division's C-130s participated in Operation Banish Beach in 1967. In this operation, the transports performed free-fall airdrops of drums of diesel fuel or JP-4 The fuel was then ignited by fighters dropping napalm or by the C-130s dropping smoke grenades on the fuel to clear large forested areas. The Banish Beach technique was practiced operationally at the request of the Marine Corps to support Operation Allen Brook.

==== Siege of Khe Sanh ====
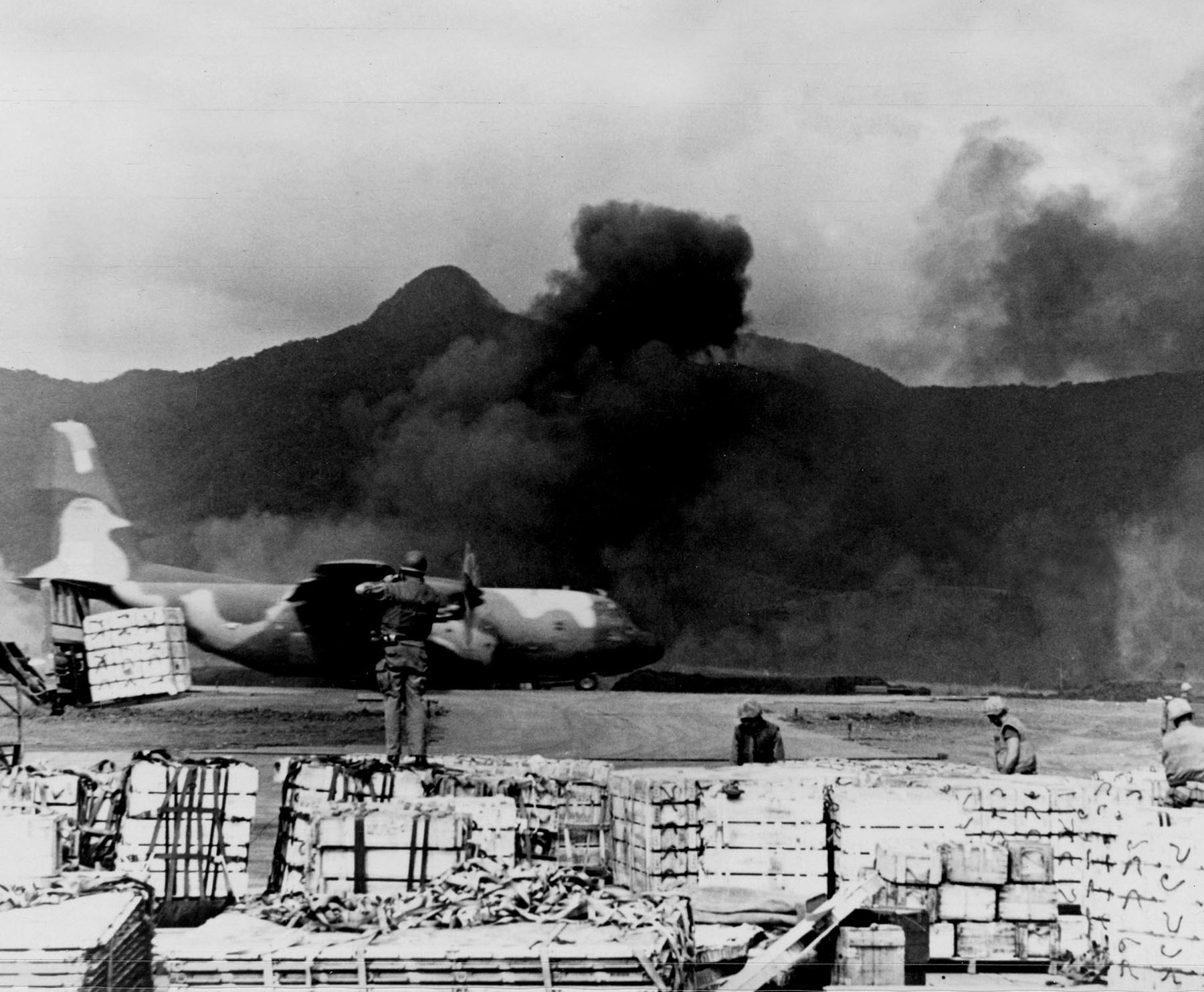
C-130 Hercules taking off from Khe Sanh

The division earned a Presidential Unit Citation for its support to besieged Marines during the Siege of Khe Sanh. Army special forces established a Civilian Irregular Defense Group camp at Khe Sanh approximately 10 miles from the border between South and North Viet Nam in 1962. In 1967 this base was taken over by the Marines. During the summer of 1967, Navy Seabees improved the runway at Khe Sanh with aluminum planking dropped by division C-130s using the Low Altitude Parachute Extraction System (LAPES). The improved field was suitable for use by the division's C-7s, C-123s and C-130s. When the attack began, the division had 240 transports available to it to meet airlift demands. (Note: An additional twenty-one UC-123s of the 12th Special Operations Squadron could be readily converted for transport use if needed. Nalty, p. 42. These planes were called on for airlift duty during the peak demand for airlift during the Tet Offensive. Abstract, Vol. 1, History 834 Air Division Jul 1967 – Jun 1968.)

The initial attack by the North Vietnam Army on 21 January 1968 gouged holes in the runway, but Seabees began to repair the runway damage. However, airlift aircraft landing or taking off at Khe Sanh could now routinely expect to encounter enemy fire and, once landed, attempts by the enemy to destroy them by mortar fire. Additionally, the lighting system for night landings had been destroyed.

The most critical initial need was replenishment of the base's stored munitions, 98% of which had been destroyed in the initial attack. The division diverted C-123s (the largest airlift aircraft capable of using the damaged runway) to meet this need. On return flights, division planes flew out refugees and casualties. In the first two days, the division was able to replenish 120 tons of munitions, conducting night operations by the light of flares. By the end of the month, runway repairs permitted C-130 operations to resume. Division aircraft landing at Khe Sanh were referred to as "mortar magnets" because of their attractiveness as targets for enemy fire. The transports used a technique called "speed offloading" to deliver their cargo. Runners were fixed to the planes' rear ramps and onboard pallets, and as the planes taxied, the pallets were released and rolled off the planes impelled by the planes' motion and "vigorous kicks" by their loadmasters. Even adding in additional time to onload passengers, a typical C-123K sortie was on the ground for only three minutes.

On 5 February, a division-controlled C-130 from the 345th Tactical Airlift Squadron transporting ammunition and a medical evacuation team to Khe Sanh was hit by a shell that ignited ammunition boxes in the cargo compartment. The crew fought the fire while the pilot Lt. Col. Howard Dallman, backed up the plane to an area at the far end of the runway, where, if the ammunition exploded, it would not destroy the runway and support facilities nearby. The crew extinguished the fire and helped offload the ammo boxes without further damage. Lt. Col Dallman, received the Air Force Cross for his actions.

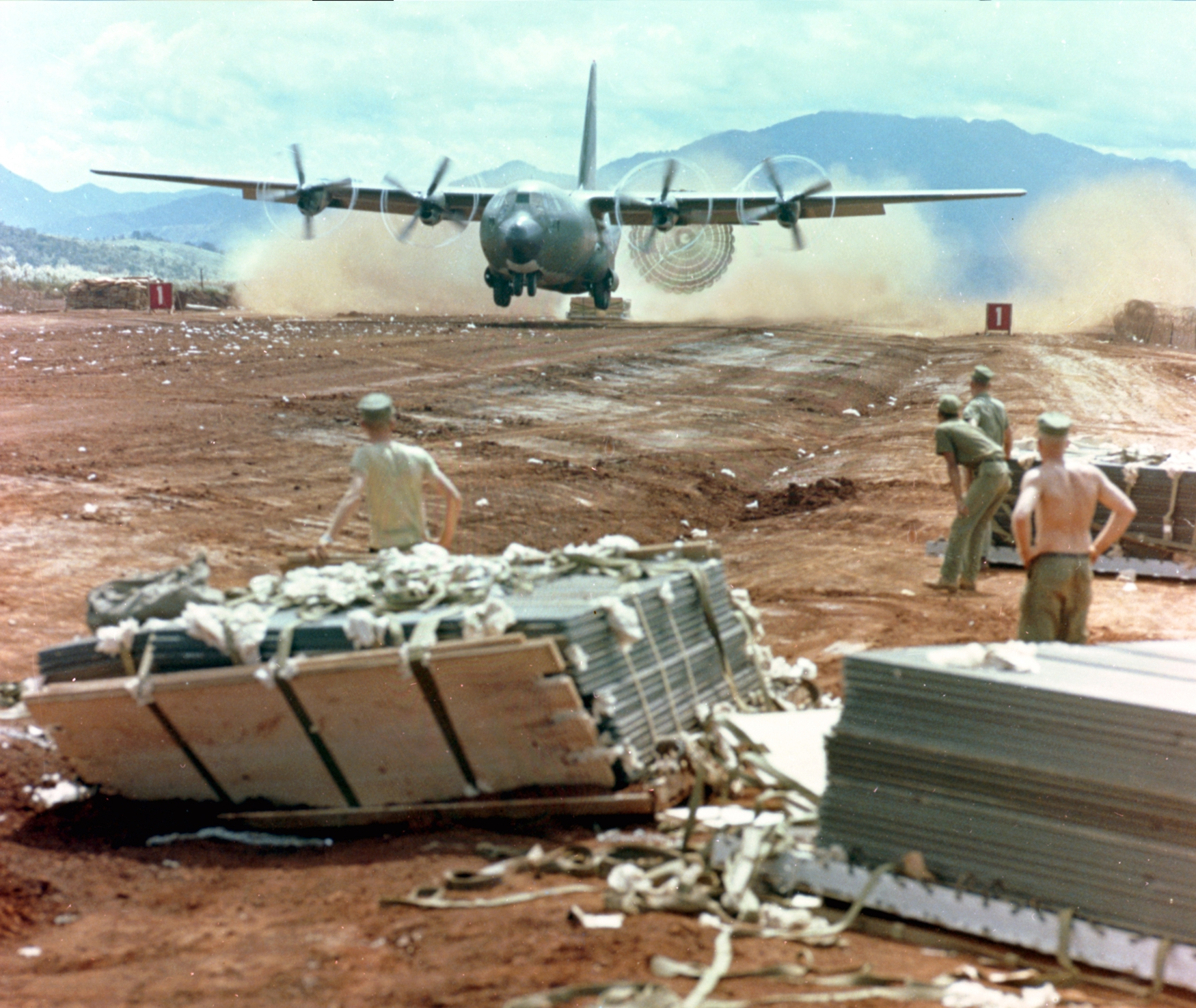
C-130 using LAPES in Vietnam

By 7 February, seven C-130s had received battle damage approaching or on the ground at Khe Sanh. Seventh Air Force decided the Hercules was too valuable an asset to risk in landings there, except for four high priority missions. Although air drops by the planes continued, for the next month, missions requiring landings were limited to those carried out by the 315th Wing's Providers or the 483d Wing's Caribous. Hercules aircraft continued to deliver cargo using the Container Delivery System and LAPES. LAPES deliveries, however damaged the runway, although the damage was limited to the far end of the runway and did not impede C-123s. When equipment for LAPES ran into short supply, the 834th was able to scrounge ten sets of the abandoned Ground Proximity Extraction System, which used cables and arresting hooks to extract cargo from low flying cargo planes, and installed them at Khe Sanh.

Division losses at Khe Sanh amounted to three C-123s, plus one C-130 lost after the siege had been officially lifted.

==== Later actions ====
On 10 May 1968, The special forces camp at Kham Duc in the central highlands near Laos came under heavy mortar fire and was ordered to be evacuated. On 12 May, during evacuation efforts, an Army Boeing CH-47 Chinook and two division C-130s were disabled by enemy fire. One C-130 burst into flames at the end of the runway, killing all aboard. The final C-130 took off thinking it had boarded the last of the men on the ground. As the Viet Cong overran the forward outpost and established gun positions on the airstrip, eight aircraft were destroyed and the C-130 on the runway reduced its usable length to only about 2,200 feet. However, the three-man combat control team, in charge of directing the evacuation, was still on the ground searching for survivors.

Informed that three men remained behind, Lt Col Joe M. Jackson of the division's 311th Air Commando Squadron dove his C-123K from 9,000 feet altitude to land at the field. Unable to slow by reversing his propellers, (Note: Reversing the propellers on the C-123K shut off the two jet engines. They would have to be restarted before the aircraft could begin to take off again.) he jammed on the brakes and skidded halfway down the runway. The three combat controllers jumped from a culvert next to the runway and leaped into the open rear cargo door. A 122 mm rocket, fired from just outside the perimeter stopped only 10 meters from the plane. It did not explode. Jackson taxied around the shell and took off under heavy fire from the hills on either side of the camp. For this rescue, he was awarded the Medal of Honor

As American participation in the War in Vietnam lessened, the division saw changes to its mission. During the summer of 1971, its 315th Wing began training Republic of Vietnam Air Force crews on the C-123, preparing them to assume an expanded airlift mission. As other wings inactivated, their squadrons that remained in country were transferred to the 315th and 483d Wings and the division found itself performing close air support, interdiction, electronic warfare and psychological warfare missions in 1971. (Note: These missions were performed by the 8th, 9th and 90th Special Operations Squadrons and the 360th 361st and 362d Tactical Electronic Warfare Squadrons. Maurer, pp. 165, 269.) During its last few months, the 834th worked toward passing combat airlift control to Seventh Air Force.

=== Return to the United States ===
The division returned to the United States and TAC as part of the US withdrawal from South Vietnam on 31 January 1972, although it was not manned at Little Rock Air Force Base, Arkansas until 15 March. That day it was assigned the 314th Tactical Airlift Wing at Little Rock; the 313th Tactical Airlift Wing at Forbes Air Force Base, Kansas; and the 516th Tactical Airlift Wing at Dyess Air Force Base, Texas When the drawdown of US forces in the Pacific continued, the 463d Tactical Airlift Wing in the Philippines shut down its operations and moved to replace the 516th Wing at Dyess in June.

From 1972 until it was inactivated, "the division supervised . . . C-130 tactical airlift operations and participated in a series of tactical airlift exercises and joint training missions with United States Army units. Squadrons and detachment-size elements frequently deployed to points in Europe, the Panama Canal Zone, Africa, Thailand, and elsewhere. The 834th flew many humanitarian missions to such widespread places as Africa, the Philippines, Colombia, and Honduras."

The division was transferred to Military Airlift Command (MAC) on 1 December 1974 as part of TAC's turnover of the theater airlift mission to MAC. However, MAC inactivated the 834th on 31 December 1974, and transferred its assigned airlift wings to Twenty-Second Air Force.

=== Pacific airlift ===
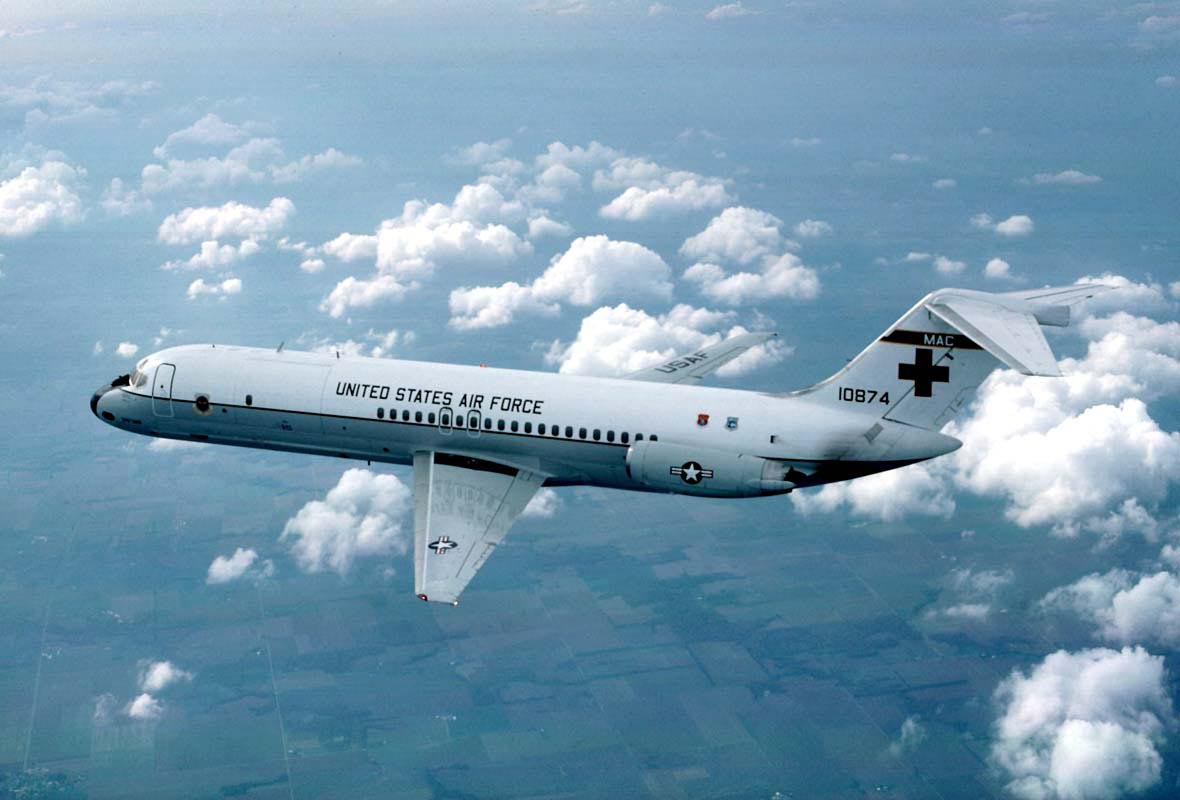
HC-9A medical evacuation aircraft

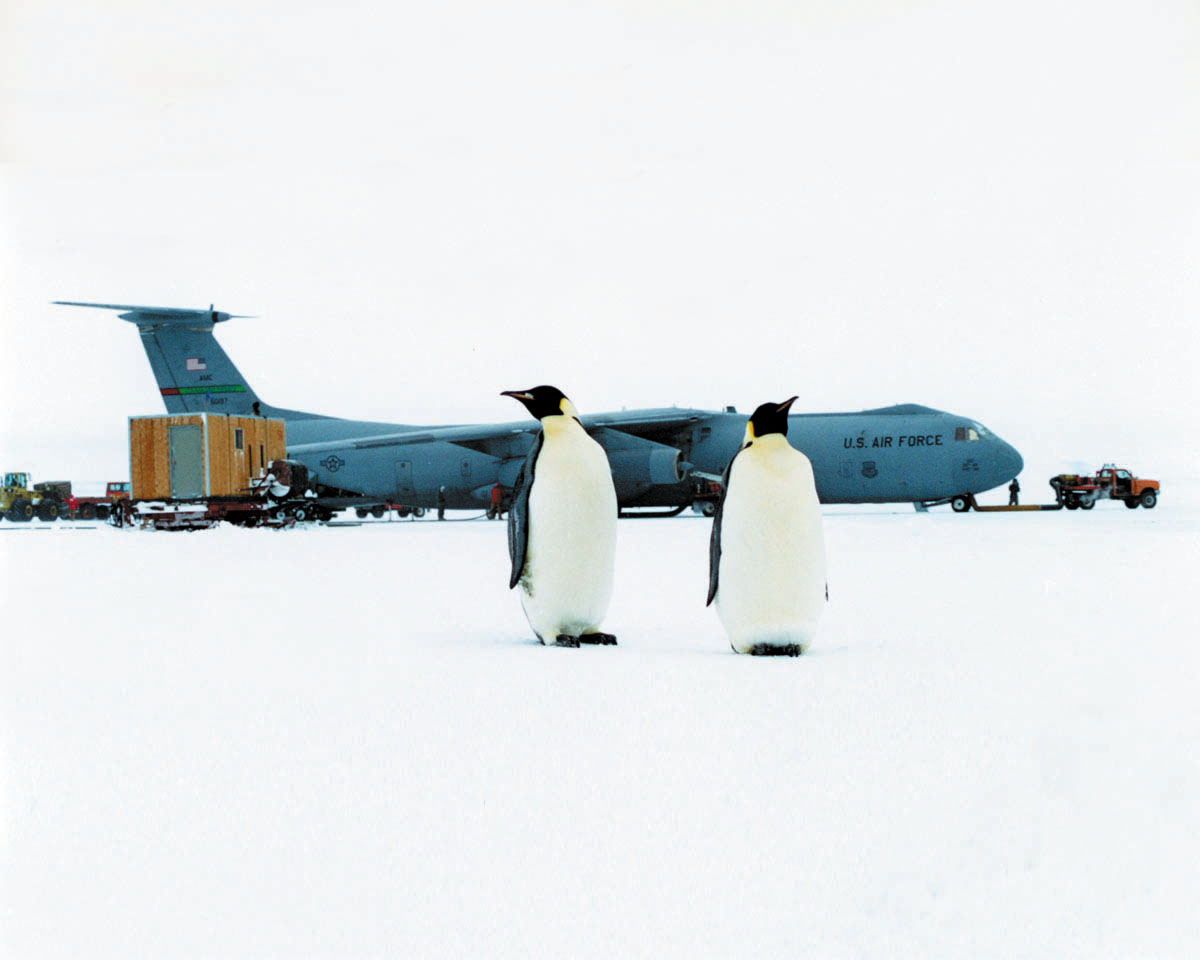
Local inhabitants in front of a C-141 Starlifter on the ice runway at McMurdo Station, Antarctica

The division was renamed the 834th Airlift Division and reactivated at Hickam Air Force Base, Hawaii in October 1978. It assumed responsibility for managing all MAC resources in the Pacific area. The 834th provided a single commander for MAC airlift units in the Pacific theater and its commander also served Pacific Air Forces (PACAF) as the special assistant for airlift. It commanded theater airlift forces for PACAF; performed airlift war planning and exercise planning and operated aerial ports for the air movement of personnel, cargo, equipment, patients, and mail.

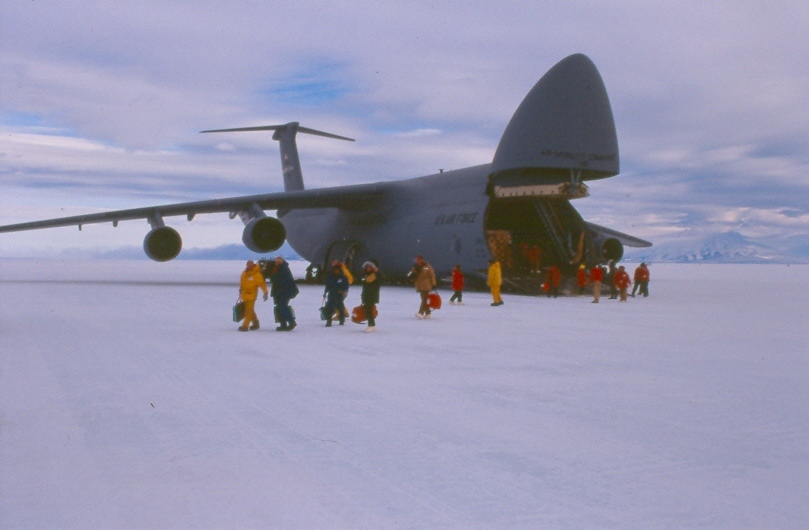
C5 in Antarctica

The division's Douglas HC-9A Nightingales performed aeromedical evacuation missions to locations as far away as Guam and Diego Garcia. It controlled attached aircraft participating in Operation Deep Freeze, the seasonal resupply of outposts in Antarctica. 1989 saw the first air drops by Lockheed C-141 Starlifters and the first landings of Lockheed C-5 Galaxys in Antarctica to support Deep Freeze.

The division originally exercised its airlift management function through the Pacific Airlift Center, while its airlift support units spread throughout the Pacific were controlled by the 61st Military Airlift Support Wing. However, reorganizations in 1980 and 1981 eliminated this intermediate level of command and airlift support units were assigned directly to the division, as were airlift managers.

The division's C-130 fleet was reduced in 1989 by the removal of aircraft from Clark Air Base in the Philippines. In conjunction with this reduction, the division's 374th Tactical Airlift Wing moved its flag to Yokota Air Base, Japan, where it assumed the personnel and equipment of the 316th Tactical Airlift Group, which was inactivated. In 1990 the division's area of responsibility was further expanded when MAC units in Alaska were assigned to it.

During Operation Desert Storm, the division commander, Brig Gen James F. Hinkel, served as the commander of airlift forces in Saudi Arabia. Shortly after the end of that operation, in June 1991, the eruption of Mount Pinatubo required the evacuation of military and dependents from Clark Air Base. The division directed the evacuation in what was termed Operation Fiery Vigil. The commander of the division's 374th Wing acted as the commander, Airlift Forces, Joint Task Force Fiery Vigil. Operations were conducted from Naval Air Station Cubi Point and continued through July.

When the decision was made not to return forces to Clark, the division's 624th Military Airlift Support Group was inactivated in November 1991. The division was inactivated in April 1992 and its remaining units were inactivated or transferred as PACAF assumed responsibility for theater airlift in the Pacific area.

== Lineage ==
- Established as the 834 Air Division on 30 August 1957

Activated on 25 September 1957
Inactivated on 1 April 1959

- Activated on 24 June 1964 (not organized)

Organized on 1 July 1964
Inactivated on 1 December 1971

- Activated on 31 January 1972

Inactivated on 31 December 1974

- Redesignated 834 Airlift Division on 23 August 1978

Activated on 1 October 1978
Inactivated on 1 April 1992

=== Assignments ===
- Ninth Air Force, 25 September 1957
- Eighteenth Air Force, 1 October 1957
- Twelfth Air Force, 1 January 1958 – 1 April 1959
- Tactical Air Command, 24 June 1964 (not organized)
- Ninth Air Force, 1 July 1964
- Seventh Air Force, 15 October 1966 – 1 December 1971
- Twelfth Air Force, 31 January 1972
- Twenty-Second Air Force, 1 – 31 December 1974
- Twenty-Second Air Force, 1 October 1978 – 1 April 1992

=== Stations ===
- England Air Force Base, Louisiana, 25 September 1957 – 1 April 1959
- England Air Force Base, Louisiana, 1 July 1964 – 15 October 1966
- Tan Son Nhut Air Base, South Vietnam, 15 October 1966 – 1 December 1971
- Little Rock Air Force Base, Arkansas, 31 January 1972 – 31 December 1974
- Hickam Air Force Base, Hawaii, 1 October 1978 – 1 April 1992

=== Components ===
Wings

- 3d Tactical Fighter Wing: 1 July 1964 – 8 November 1965
- 27th Tactical Fighter Wing: attached 15 July 1958 – 18 February 1959

Bergstrom Air Force Base, Texas

- 31st Tactical Fighter Wing: 1 January 1965 – 1 August 1966

Homestead Air Force Base, Florida

- 61st Military Airlift Support Wing: 1 October 1978 – 1 October 1980
- 313th Tactical Airlift Wing: 15 March 1972 – 30 September 1973

Forbes Air Force Base, Kansas

- 314th Tactical Airlift Wing: 15 March 1972 – 31 December 1974
- 315th Air Commando Wing (later 315th Special Operations Wing, 315th Tactical Airlift Wing): 15 October 1966 – 1 December 1971

Phan Rang Air Base, South Vietnam after 15 June 1967

- 366th Fighter-Bomber Wing (later 366th Tactical Fighter Wing): 25 September 1957 – 1 April 1959
- 374th Tactical Airlift Wing: 1 October 1978 – 1 April 1992

Clark Air Base, Philippines until 8 October 1989, Yokota Air Base, Japan

- 401st Fighter-Bomber Wing (later 401st Tactical Fighter Wing): 25 September 1957 – 1 April 1959; 1 July 1964 – 27 April 1966
- 463d Tactical Airlift Wing: 1 June 1972 – 31 December 1974

Dyess Air Force Base, Texas

- 483d Troop Carrier Wing (later 483 Tactical Airlift Wing): 15 October 1966 – 1 December 1971 (Not operational until 3 November 1966)

Cam Ranh Bay Air Base, South Vietnam

- 516th Tactical Airlift Wing: 15 March – 1 June 1972

Dyess Air Force Base, Texas

Groups

- 2d Aerial Port Group: 8 November 1966 – 1 December 1971
- 316th Tactical Airlift Group: 1 October 1978 – 8 October 1989

Yokota Air Base, Japan

- 603d Military Airlift Support Group: 1 January 1986 – 1 April 1992

Kadena Air Base, Okinawa

- 611th Military Airlift Support Group: (see 611th Military Airlift Support Squadron)
- 616th Military Airlift Group: 9 August 1990 – 1 April 1992

Elmendorf Air Force Base, Alaska

- 624th Military Airlift Support Group: 1 October 1989 – 15 November 1991

Clark Air Base, Philippines

- 834th Air Base Group (later 834th Combat Support Group): 25 September 1957 – 1 April 1959, 1 July 1964 – 1 August 1966

Squadrons

- 9th Aeromedical Evacuation Squadron: 9 August 1990 – 1 April 1992

Yokota Air Base, Japan

- No. 35 Squadron RAAF, 15 October 1966 – 1 December 1971

Vung Tau Air Base, Viet Nam.

- 605th Military Airlift Support Squadron: 1 April 1980 – 1 April 1992

Anderson Air Force Base, Guam

- 611th Military Airlift Support Squadron (later 611th Military Airlift Support Group): 1 November 1983 – 1 April 1992

Osan Air Base, South Korea

- 619th Military Airlift Support Squadron: 1 April 1980 – 1 April 1992

Other

- Pacific Airlift Center: 1 October 1978 – 15 January 1981
- 834th Tactical Hospital: 1 July 1964 – 1 August 1966
- 4458th USAF Hospital: 25 September 1957 – 1 April 1959

=== Aircraft ===
- Republic F-84 Thunderstreak, 1957
- North American F-100 Super Sabre, 1957–1959; 1964–1966
- McDonnell F-101 Voodoo, 1958–1959
- Douglas C-47 Skytrain, 1966–1971
- Douglas EC-47 Skytrain, 1966–1971
- Fairchild C-123 Provider, 1966–1971
- Fairchild UC-123 Provider, 1966–1971
- Lockheed C-130 Hercules, 1966–1971, 1972–1974, 1978–1992
- de Havilland Canada C-7 Caribou, 1967–1971, 1972
- Lockheed C-5 Galaxy, 1970–1971, 1978–1992
- Cessna A-37 Dragonfly, 1971
- Cessna O-2 Skymaster, 1971
- Douglas HC-9A Nightingale, 1978–1992
- Lockheed C-141 Starlifter, 1978–1992

=== Commanders ===
- Col Victor E. Warford, 25 September 1957
- Brig Gen Ivan W. McElroy, c. 15 July 1958 – 1 April 1959
- Col Richard V. Travis, 1 July 1964
- Brig Gen William P. McBride, 14 June 1965
- Col James J. England, 18 June – 1 August 1966
- Col Robert T. Simpson, 15 October 1966
- Brig Gen William G. Moore Jr., 30 October 1966
- Brig Gen Hugh E. Wild, 1 September 1967
- Brig Gen William G. Moore Jr., 26 September 1967
- Brig Gen Hugh E. Wild, 12 November 1967
- Maj Gen Burl W. McLaughlin, 29 November 1967
- Brig Gen John H. Herring Jr., 23 June 1969
- Brig Gen John H. Germerad, 9 June – 1 December 1971
- Brig Gen Eugene W. Gauch Jr., 15 March 1972
- Col Robert F. Coverdale, 16 July – 31 December 1974
- Col Jimmy L. Maturo, 1 October 1978
- Col Browning C. Wharton Jr., 30 June 1980
- Col Richard J. Trzaskoma, 21 August 1981
- Brig Gen Gary H. Mears, 6 July 1983
- Brig Gen James J. LeCleir, 20 August 1985
- Brig Gen Vernon J. Kondra, 19 August 1987
- Brig Gen James F. Hinkel, 31 July 1989 – 1 April 1992

=== Awards and campaigns ===
Award streamer	Award	Dates	Notes
	Presidential Unit Citation	21 January 1968-12 May 1968	834th Air Division, Vietnam
	Presidential Unit Citation	1 April 1970-30 June 1970	834th Air Division, Vietnam
	Air Force Outstanding Unit Award w/Combat "V" Device	15 October 1966-30 April 1967	834th Air Division
	Air Force Outstanding Unit Award	1 July 1983-30 June 1985	834th Airlift Division
	Vietnamese Gallantry Cross with Palm	[15] October 1966-30 October 1971	834th Air Division
	Vietnamese Gallantry Cross with Palm	15 October 1966-1 December 1971	834th Air Division

Campaign Streamer	Campaign	Dates	Notes
	Vietnam Air Offensive	15 October 1966 – 8 March 1967	834th Air Division
	Vietnam Air Offensive, Phase II	9 March 1967 – 31 March 1968	834th Air Division
	Vietnam Air/Ground	22 January 1968 – 7 July 1968	834th Air Division
	Vietnam Air Offensive, Phase III	1 April 1968 – 31 October 1968	834th Air Division
	Vietnam Air Offensive, Phase IV	1 November 1968 – 22 February 1969	834th Air Division
	Tet 1969/Counteroffensive	23 February 1969 – 8 June 1969	834th Air Division
	Vietnam Summer-Fall 1969	9 June 1969 – 31 October 1969	834th Air Division
	Vietnam Winter-Spring 1970	3 November 1969 – 30 April 1970	834th Air Division
	Sanctuary Counteroffensive	1 May 1970 – 30 June 1970	834th Air Division
	Southwest Monsoon	1 July 1970 – 30 November 1970	834th Air Division
	Commando Hunt V	1 December 1970 – 14 May 1971	834th Air Division
	Commando Hunt VI	15 May 1971 – 31 July 1971	834th Air Division
	Commando Hunt VII	1 November 1971 – 1 December 1971	834th Air Division

== See also ==
- List of F-100 units of the United States Air Force
- List of Lockheed C-130 Hercules operators
- List of United States Air Force air divisions
