= Vernon J. Kondra =

US Air Force lieutenant general (born 1938)

Vernon J Kondra
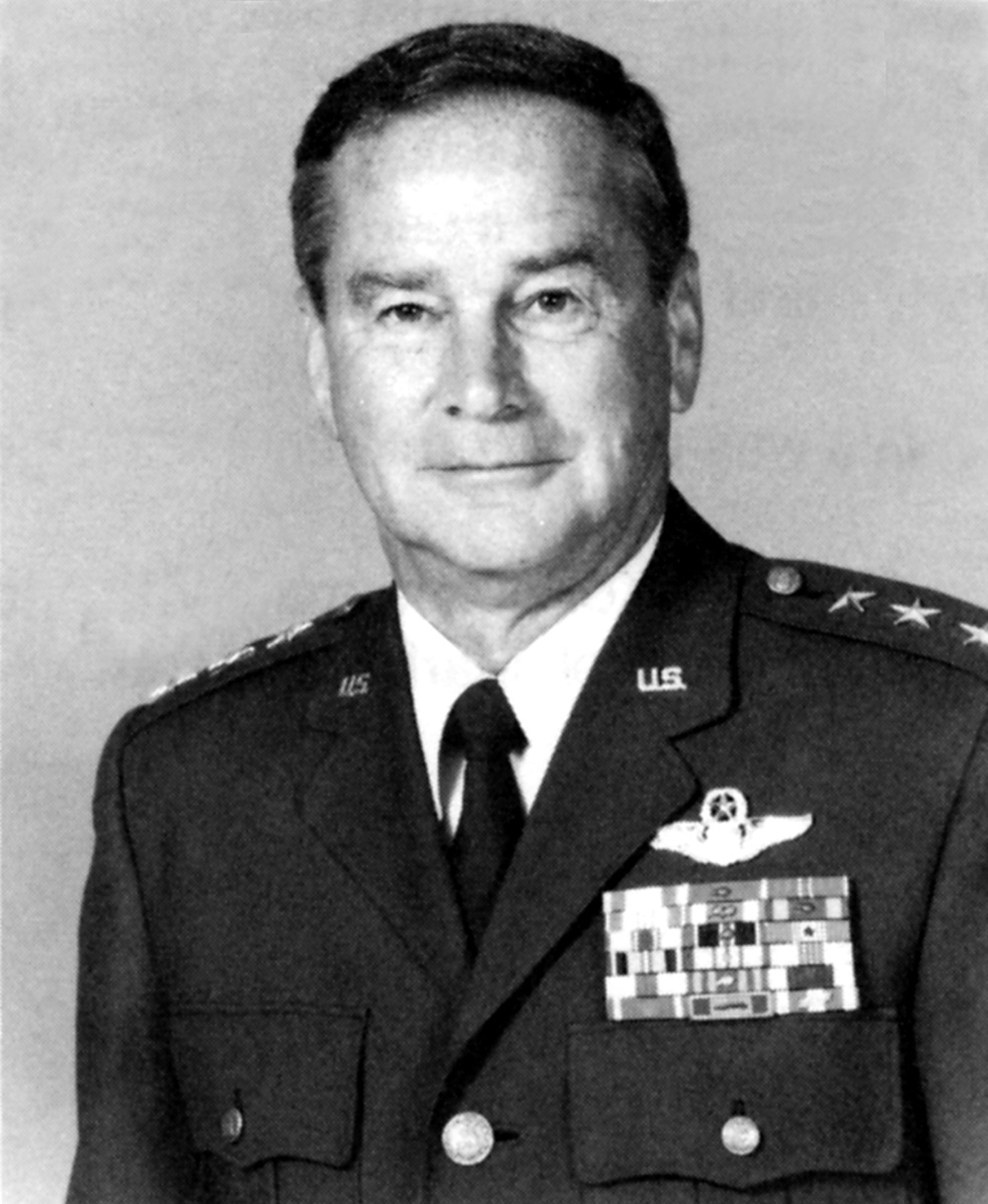
- Born: 1 June 1938 (age 88); Kelso, Washington, U.S.
- Military career
- Allegiance: United States
- Branch: United States Air Force
- Service years: 1961-1992
- Rank: Lieutenant General
- Commands: 21st Air Force; 834th Airlift Division; 62nd Airlift Wing
- Conflicts: Vietnam War; Gulf War
- Awards: Air Force Distinguished Service Medal; Legion of Merit; Bronze Star Medal; Defense Meritorious Service Medal; Meritorious Service Medal; Air Medal

Vernon J Kondra (born June 1, 1938) is a retired lieutenant general in the United States Air Force. He entered the Air Force in 1961 and retired in 1992 following the Gulf War. He commanded the 21st Air Force.

== Early life and education ==
Kondra was born in Kelso, Washington in 1938 where he attended Kelso High School where he was Associated Student Body (ASB) president as a Senior, Junior class president and lettered in baseball, basketball and football. He graduated in 1956. Following high school, he attended the State College of Washington (now known as Washington State University), and was part of the Tau Kappa Epsilon fraternity and played baseball. In his Junior year he was nominated as a Distinguished Military Student, which bestows the highest Air Force honor. He graduated with a degree in biology in 1961. He then completed Squadron Officer school in 1964 as a distinguished graduate. In 1974, he finished Industrial College of the Armed Forces, followed by Armed Forces Staff College in 1975, Air War College in 1981 and finally in 1985, the Graduate School of Industrial Administration at Carnegie Mellon University.

== Military career ==
Upon his graduation from Washington State University in 1961, he was commissioned in July that same year through the Reserve Officer Training Corps as a second lieutenant in the Air Force. He began flying C124s at McChord Air Force Base outside Tacoma, Washington and after receiving his C123 qualifications at Pope Air Force Base in North Carolina, he was assigned temporary duty to Da Nang Air Base in Vietnam. He returned stateside and spent 1963 to 1969 at McChord and received certification on the C141. He spent time, again, at Da Nang Air Base as an executive officer for the 617th Military Airlift Support Squadron.

Between 1972 and 1975, Kondra was executive officer to the Military Airlift Command vice commander. He then became a C141 commander of the 4th Military Airlift Squadron, followed by the operations officer of the 8th Military Airlift Squadron. He continued to increase in command and was deputy commander of operations of the 62nd Airlift Wing until late 1980.

Further responsibilities increased and in 1986 he served as deputy director of operations at the National Military Command Center, Organization of the Joint Chiefs of Staff in Washington, DC. The following year he assumed command of the 834th Airlift Division at Hickam Air Force Base in Hawaii. Other roles were special assistant for airlift to the commander in chief, Pacific Air Forces. In 1990, he became deputy to chief of staff for operations, responsible for directing the airlift operations for the Desert Shield and Desert Storm operations.

On July 17, 1991, he was promoted to lieutenant general and assumed command of the 21st Air Force that same year. Kondra retired in 1992.

== Gulf War ==
When President George H.W. Bush began deploying units to the Middle East in August 1990, it sparked the largest airlift in history. Kondra directed the massive airlift operations for Operation Desert Shield and Desert Storm as the Deputy Chief of Staff for Operations at Headquarters Military Airlift Command (MAC). A C141 was touching down in Saudi Arabia every 10 minutes, 24 hours a day for seven months. His command oversaw the movement of half-million short tons of cargo and nearly 500,000 civilians, far exceeding the 1947-48 Berlin Airlift.

== Military awards ==
His major awards and decorations include the:

- Distinguished Service Medal
- Legion of Merit with oak leaf cluster
- Bronze Star Medal
- Defense Meritorious Service Medal
- Meritorious Service Medal with three oak leaf clusters
- Air Medal with two oak leaf clusters
- Air Force Commendation Medal with oak leaf cluster
- National Defense Service Medal
- Armed Forces Expeditionary Medal
- Vietnam Service Medal with five service stars
- Air Force Longevity Service Award with five oak leaf clusters
- Small Arms Expert Marksmanship Ribbon
- Gallantry Cross (Vietnam) with Palm
- Vietnam Campaign Medal

He was also awarded the Order of the Sword in 1986.
