= Robert Coverdale (footballer) =

English footballer

Personal information
- Date of birth: 16 January 1892
- Place of birth: West Hartlepool, England
- Date of death: 7 January 1959 (aged 66)
- Height: 5 ft 8 in (1.73 m)
- Position: Wing half

Senior career*
Years	Team	Apps	(Gls)
1911–1912	Rutherglen Glencairn		
1912–1921	Sunderland	21	(0)
1921–1924	Hull City	63	(5)
1924–1925	Grimsby Town	30	(1)
1925–1928	Bridlington Town		
- * Club domestic league appearances and goals

Robert Coverdale (16 January 1892 – 7 January 1959) was an English professional footballer who played as a wing half in the Football League for Sunderland, Hull City and Grimsby Town.
