= Robert F. Coverdale =

United States Air Force general (1930–2020)

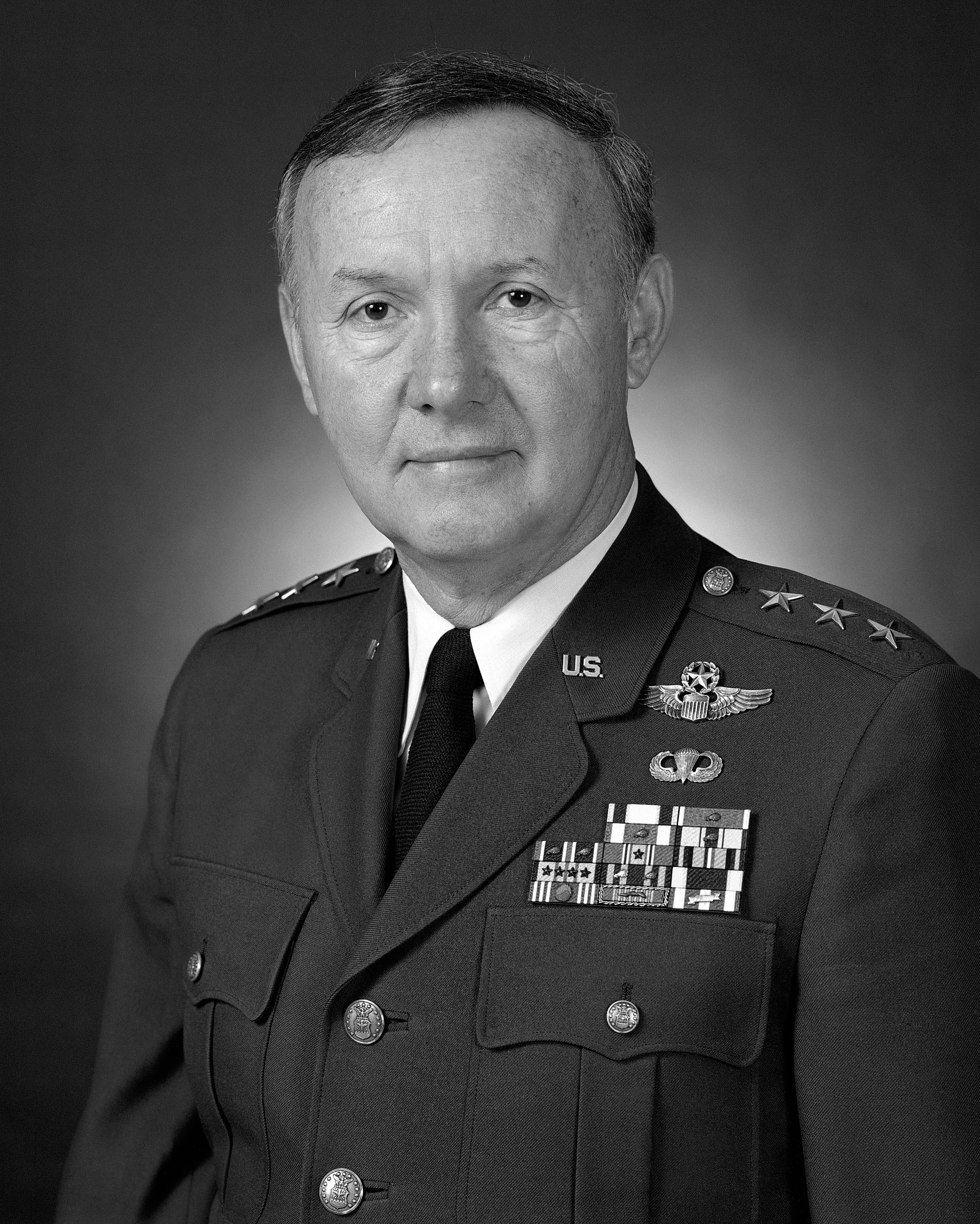
- Born: September 24, 1930; Amherst, Ohio, U.S.
- Died: July 24, 2020 (aged 89); Naples, Florida, U.S.
- Military career
- Allegiance: United States of America
- Branch: United States Air Force
- Service years: 1953–1985
- Rank: Lieutenant general
- Awards: Distinguished Service Medal, Legion of Merit with oak leaf cluster, Meritorious Service Medal with oak leaf cluster, Air Force Commendation Medal with oak leaf cluster, Republic of Vietnam Gallantry Cross with palm, Republic of Korea Order of National Security Merit

Robert F. Coverdale (September 24, 1930 – July 24, 2020) was a lieutenant general in the United States Air Force who served as vice commander in chief, Military Airlift Command, with headquarters at Scott Air Force Base, Illinois.

== Biography ==
Robert F. Coverdale was born on September 24, 1930 in Amherst, Ohio, and graduated from Amherst High School in 1948. He attended Ohio Wesleyan University in Delaware, Ohio, and received a Bachelor of Arts degree in 1952. He graduated from the Armed Forces Staff College at Norfolk, Virginia, in 1967.

Coverdale was commissioned a second lieutenant through the Air Force Reserve Officers' Training Corps program and received his pilot wings after completing training at Vance Air Force Base, Oklahoma., in November 1953.

His first assignment as a C-119 pilot at Sewart Air Force Base, Tennennessee, with the 75th and 62nd Troop Carrier Squadrons, was the beginning of his long career in airlift. While at Sewart he also served as a C-130 pilot, chief of the command post, aircraft scheduling officer and as the 314th Troop Carrier Wing's chief of training.

Coverdale was assigned to Detachment 1, 315th Air Division, Naha Air Base, Okinawa, in September 1962. His positions there included chief of standardization with the 6315th Operations Group and operations officer of the 817th Troop Carrier Squadron.

Coverdale departed Okinawa in July 1965 and was assigned at Langley Air Force Base, Virginia, serving first with the 4450th Standardization-Evaluation Group and later with Headquarters Tactical Air Command as a staff officer in airlift concept and doctrine.

In August 1967, after graduation from the Armed Forces Staff College, he was assigned to Detachment 4, 314th Air Division at Don Muang Airport, Thailand, where he served as operations officer. He returned to the United States in August 1968 and was assigned to Headquarters U.S. Air Force, Washington, D.C., where he became chief of the Employment Test Branch for the deputy director for operational test and evaluation.

Coverdale became vice commander of the 516th Tactical Airlift Wing at Dyess Air Force Base, Texas, in March 1971. He assumed command of the wing, redesignated as the 463rd Tactical Airlift Wing, in June 1972. Coverdale was named commander of the 314th Tactical Airlift Wing at Little Rock Air Force Base, Arkansas, in November 1973, and took command of the 834th Air Division there in July 1974.

In June 1975 he became commander of the 317th Tactical Airlift Wing as well as the first commander of the newly established U.S. Air Force Airlift Center at Pope Air Force Base, North Carolina. He was named deputy chief of staff for plans, Headquarters Military Airlift Command at Scott Air Force Base in August 1977, and become the command's chief of staff, in December 1979. From May 1980 to July 1981, Coverdale commanded 22nd Air Force at Travis Air Force Base, Calif.

Coverdale was a command pilot with more than 7,200 flying hours in various types of transport aircraft. He flew 46 combat missions in Southeast Asia and accumulated 162 combat flying hours. Coverdale also has a parachutist rating, which he received in 1975 after completing Airborne Jump School with the 82nd Airborne Division at Fort Bragg in North Carolina. His military decorations and awards include the Distinguished Service Medal, Legion of Merit with oak leaf cluster, Meritorious Service Medal with oak leaf cluster, Air Force Commendation Medal with oak leaf cluster, Republic of Vietnam Gallantry Cross with palm and Republic of Korea Order of National Security Merit.

Coverdale was promoted to lieutenant general August 1, 1981 and retired four years later on the same day, in 1985.

Coverdale died at his home in Naples, Florida on July 24, 2020, at the age of 89.
