= Military Airlift Command =

Inactive U.S. Air Force major command

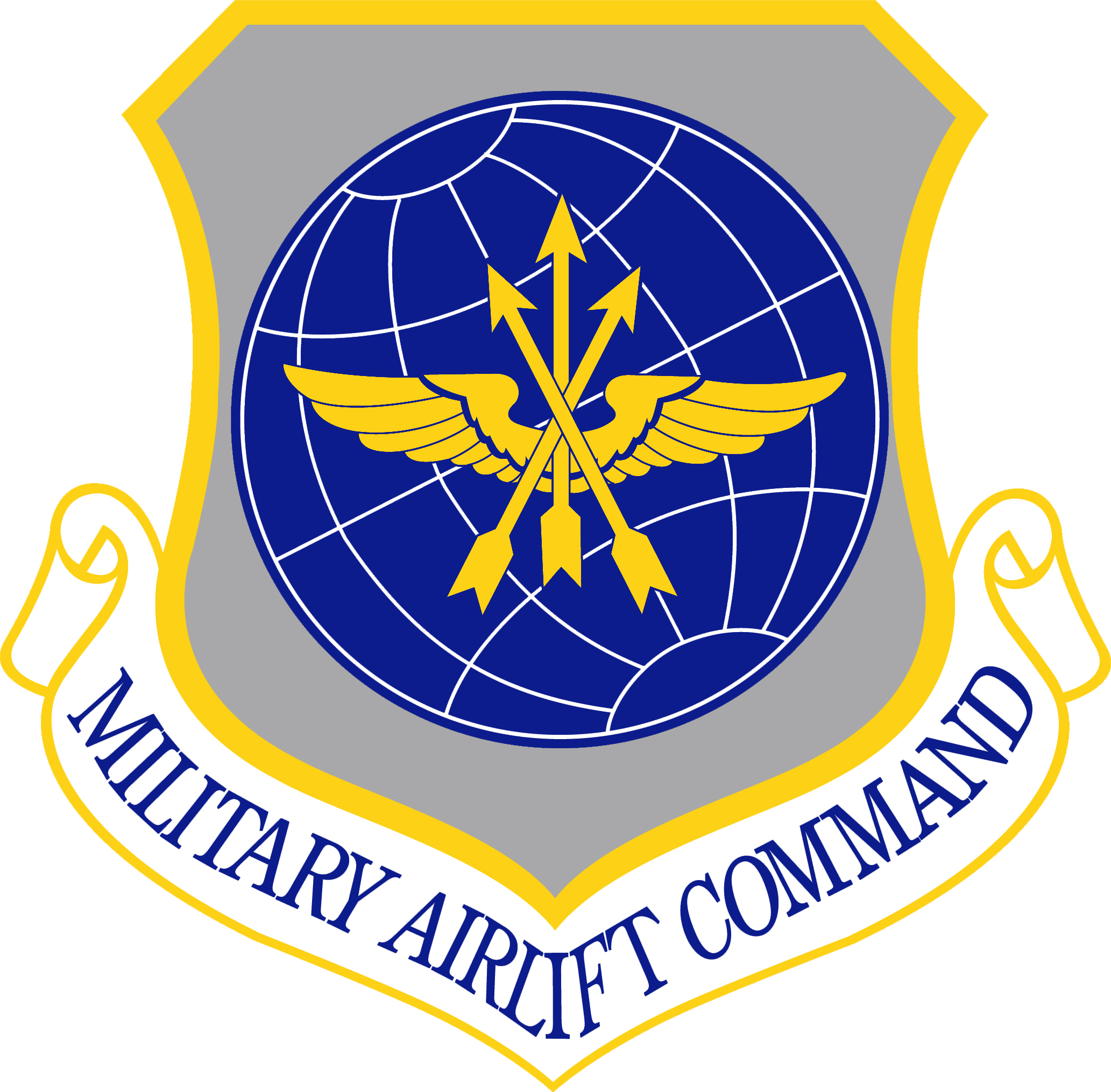
- Military Airlift Command insignia
- Active: 1966–1992
- Country: United States
- Branch: United States Air Force
- Type: Major Command
- Role: Airlift
- Decorations: Air Force Outstanding Unit Award

The Military Airlift Command (MAC) is an inactive United States Air Force major command (MAJCOM) that was headquartered at Scott Air Force Base, Illinois. Established on 1 January 1966, MAC was the primary strategic airlift organization of the Air Force until 1974, when Air Force tactical airlift units in the Tactical Air Command (TAC) were merged into MAC to create a unified airlift organization.

In 1982, the heritage of the World War II Air Transport Command (ATC) (1942–1948) and the postwar Military Air Transport Service (MATS) (1948–1966) were consolidated with MAC, providing a continuous history of long range airlift.

Inactivated on 1 June 1992, most of MAC's personnel and equipment were reassigned to the new Air Mobility Command (AMC), with a smaller portion divided between U.S. Air Forces in Europe (USAFE), Pacific Air Forces (PACAF) and the newly created Air Education and Training Command (AETC). The heritage of MAC (and its predecessor organizations) was officially consolidated into AMC in 2016.

== Military Air Transport Service ==
See: Military Air Transport Service for history of organization prior to 1 January 1966

MAC was the USAF successor organization to the Department of Defense's Military Air Transport Service (MATS), with MATS having been disestablished on 8 January 1966. MAC's emblem reflected its predecessor's history by incorporating the globe-wings-arrows emblem of MATS into its shield.

Although MATS was under the operational control of the United States Air Force, the 4-digit USAF Military Air Transport Service units at all levels were considered major command (MAJCOM) provisional units by USAF due to MATS being a Department of Defense Unified Command. Under the USAF lineage system, they did not possess a permanent lineage or history and were discontinued upon inactivation. AFCON (HQ Air Force-controlled) units were activated under MAC, to which USAF personnel and equipment formerly assigned to MATS MAJCOM units were reassigned effective 8 January 1966. No formal lineage or history between former MATS MAJCOM units and MAC AFCON units was ever made.

With the establishment of MAC by the USAF, plans were also made to discontinue the role of the United States Navy within the new command. MATS' shore-based naval air transport squadrons (VR) were assigned back to the Navy upon its inaction, most being converted to organic Operational Support Airlift (OSA) roles for the Navy and renamed as fleet logistics support squadrons, primarily residing in the Naval Air Reserve. However, some naval aircrews formerly assigned to MATS continued to fly USAF C-130Es for MAC until 1968, when all MAC C-130s were transferred to Tactical Air Command as part of the theater troop carrier mission being reassigned.

In addition, MAC continued the missions of several other activities formerly under MATS: the Aerospace Rescue and Recovery Service (ARRS); Air Weather Service (ARS); Special Air Mission (SAM); Air Photographic and Charting Service (ACIC) (Reassigned to the Defense Mapping Agency in 1972), and Aeromedical Transport Wing (AMTW).

In addition to these organizations, MAC supported select USAF Special Operations forces originally organized under MATS on an as-required basis until 1984, when all USAF Special Operations under Tactical Air Command (TAC) were transferred to MAC's 23rd Air Force (23AF). USAF Special Operations forces remained part of MAC until the establishment of the Air Force Special Operations Command (AFSOC) in 1990.

== History ==
=== Vietnam era (1966–1975) ===
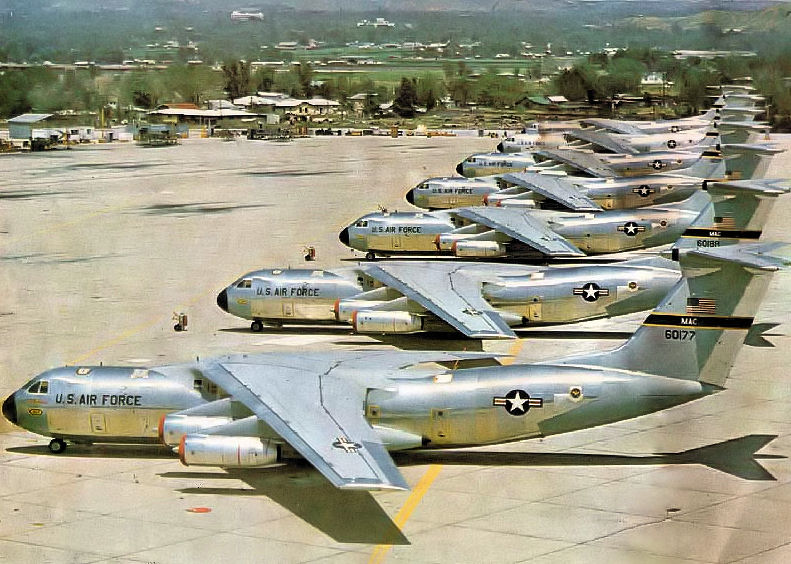
Brand-new 63d MAW C-141As on the ramp at Norton AFB, 1967. AF Ser. No. 66-0177 is in foreground. This aircraft will become the famous "Hanoi Taxi" which flew Bob Hope to USO shows in South Vietnam, and, in 1973, during the final days of the Vietnam War, repatriated American POWs from North Vietnam. Arizona Senator John McCain was one of the POWs who flew home on the Hanoi Taxi. 66-0177 was the last C-141 to be withdrawn from Air Force service after a career of almost 40 years, as the last of the fleet was retired in 2006. Today, 66-0177 is on permanent display at the National Museum of the United States Air Force at Wright-Patterson AFB, Ohio

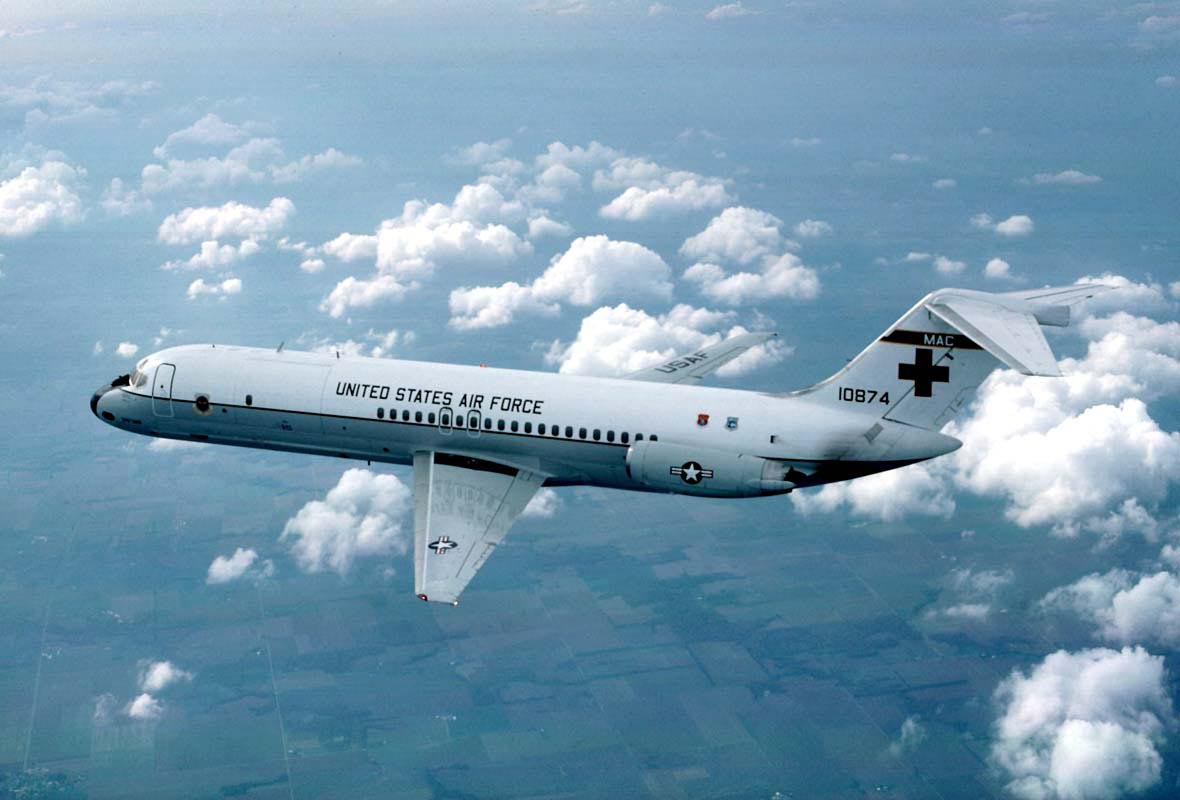
C-9 Nightingale, AF Ser. No. 71-0874, used for Aeromedical Evacuation

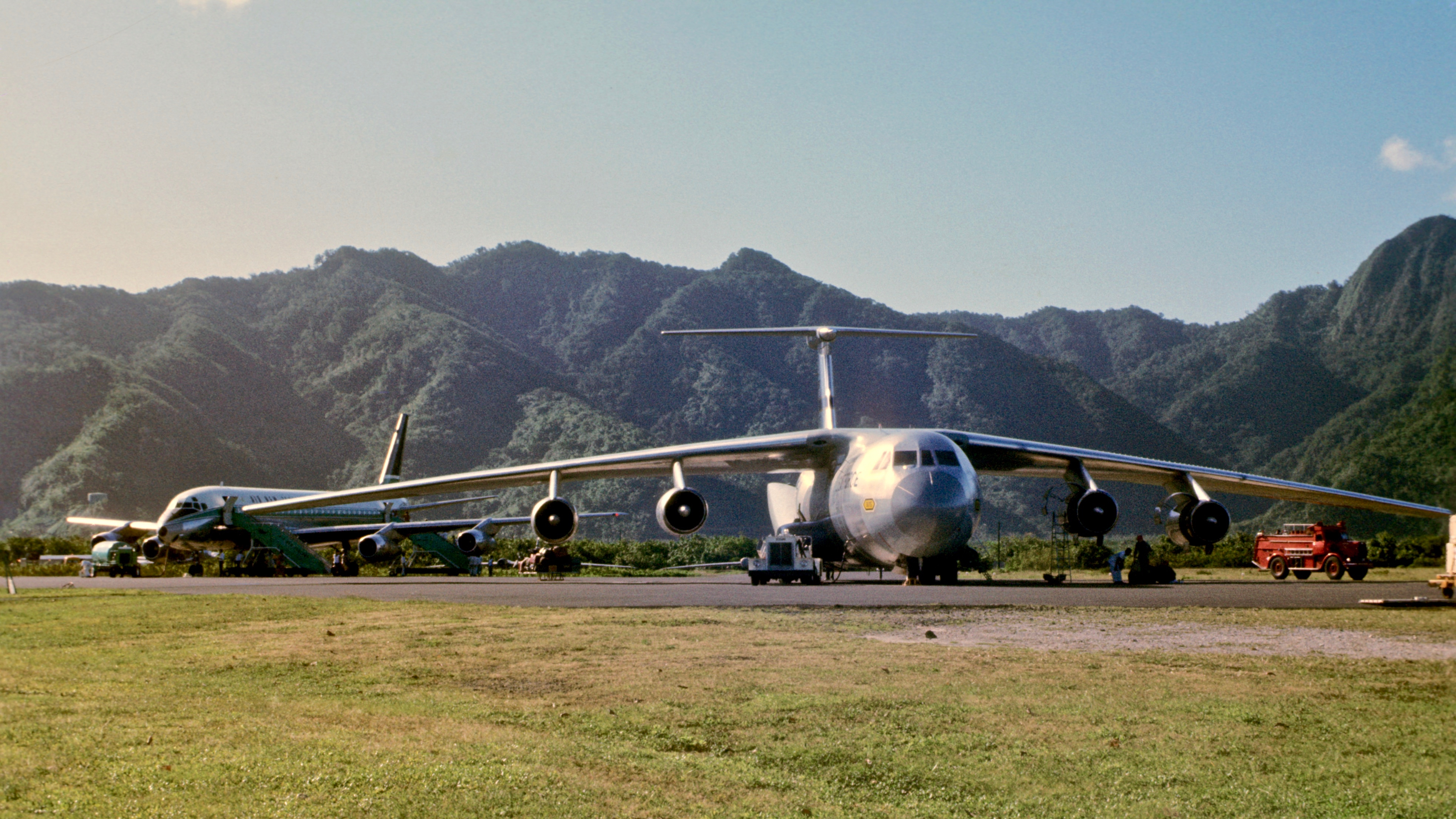
A Military Airlift Command C-141A at Pago Pago International Airport in July 1968. The aircraft behind the C-141 is an Air New Zealand DC-8.

Established at the height of the United States' involvement in the Vietnam War, MAC provided long-range strategic airlift from bases in the United States to Military Airlift Support Squadrons (MASS) located on Pacific Air Forces bases in the Pacific AOR. These were:

- Kadena Air Base, Okinawa, Japan, (603rd MASS)
- Clark Air Base, Philippines, (604th MASS)
- NAS Agana, Guam, (605th MASS)
- Mactan AB, Philippines (606th MASS)
- Henderson Field Airport, Midway Island, (607th MASS)
- Yokota Air Base, Japan, (610th MASS)
- Osan Air Base, South Korea, (611th MASS)
- Cam Ranh Air Base, South Vietnam (608th MASS)
- Tan Son Nhut Air Base, South Vietnam (616th MASS)

Phu Cat Air Base, South Vietnam (Det. 1, 616th MASS)
Bien Hoa Air Base, South Vietnam (Det. 2, 616th MASS)

- Da Nang Air Base, South Vietnam (617th MASS)

Pleiku Air Base, South Vietnam (Det. 1, 617th MASS)

- U-Tapao Royal Thai Navy Airfield, Thailand (618th MASS)

In addition, MAC operated MASS Squadrons on Non-CONUS bases in both Alaska and Hawaii:

- Elmendorf AFB, Alaska, (602d MASS)
- Hickam AFB, Hawaii, (61st MASS)

By 1968, MAC military and contract transports were hauling 150,000 passengers and 45,000 tons of cargo monthly to and from Southeast Asia. At first, MAC transports to Vietnam landed regularly only at Tan Son Nhut AB, necessitating considerable transshipment within Vietnam by the Common Service Airlift System. New air bases opened at Da Nang AB and Cam Ranh AB in January 1966, and later at Pleiku, Bien Hoa and Phu Cat Air Bases, reducing the need for redistribution.

Major unit movements by MAC aircraft from the United States usually required further airlifts to operating areas by in-country transports. Introduction of the C-5 Galaxy transport in the summer of 1970 created new problems of in-country distribution, since C-5 deliveries were massive, and, initially the planes could land only at Cam Ranh Bay. Eventually, however, C-5s could unload at Tan Son Nhut and elsewhere. Primarily, MAC transports carried high-value cargo such as aircraft and equipment parts, while MAC civilian-contract flights transported passengers to and from the combat zone.

In the winter of 1965–66, MAC conducted Operation "Blue Light," the deployment of elements of the 25th Infantry Division from Hickam AFB, Hawaii to Pleiku, South Vietnam.

During the 1968 Tet Offensive, MAC transports airlifted additional troops from the 101st Airborne Division from Fort Campbell, Kentucky to South Vietnam, supporting a buildup of forces in South Korea in response to the seizure of the United States Navy intelligence-gathering ship USS Pueblo (AGER-2) by North Korea in January 1968.

Undoubtedly the most important development of MAC during the Vietnam War was the use of the Lockheed C-141 Starlifter as an airborne ambulance evacuating casualties out of South Vietnam to hospitals in Japan, the Philippines and the United States. Generally, patients requiring hospitalization for thirty days or more were moved to offshore hospitals; others were sometimes evacuated to keep an empty-bed reserve of fifty percent in Vietnam. Military Airlift Command transports carried the more serious cases from Clark AB to the United States, and, in 1966, began making patient pickups in Vietnam.

==== 1972 Easter Offensive ====
On 30 March 1972, North Vietnam launched an all-out invasion of South Vietnam, which came to be known as the Easter Offensive. The "Vietnamization" policy of the United States had resulted in the vast majority of US ground combat forces been withdrawn from South Vietnam with PACAF's tactical air units also being reduced. Military Airlift Command's C-141 force, accustomed to operating in and out of Vietnam from offshore were utilized for movement of large numbers of men and amounts of materiel to oppose the invasion. Beginning on 21 April, MAC C-141s began shuttling passengers and cargo between Tan Son Nhut AB and the other main in-country bases, principally Da Nang AB, Bien Hoa AB, and Pleiku AB. Planes and crews were based for one or more nights at Tan Son Nhut and performed two or more days of in-country work before departing for offshore destinations. This C-141 effort permitted the Vietnam Air Force and PACAF C-130s to concentrate on drops, unit hauls, and deliveries to forward locations. The rapid American response to the invasion allowed the South Vietnamese forces to defeat the invaders for the moment.

==== Operation Homecoming ====
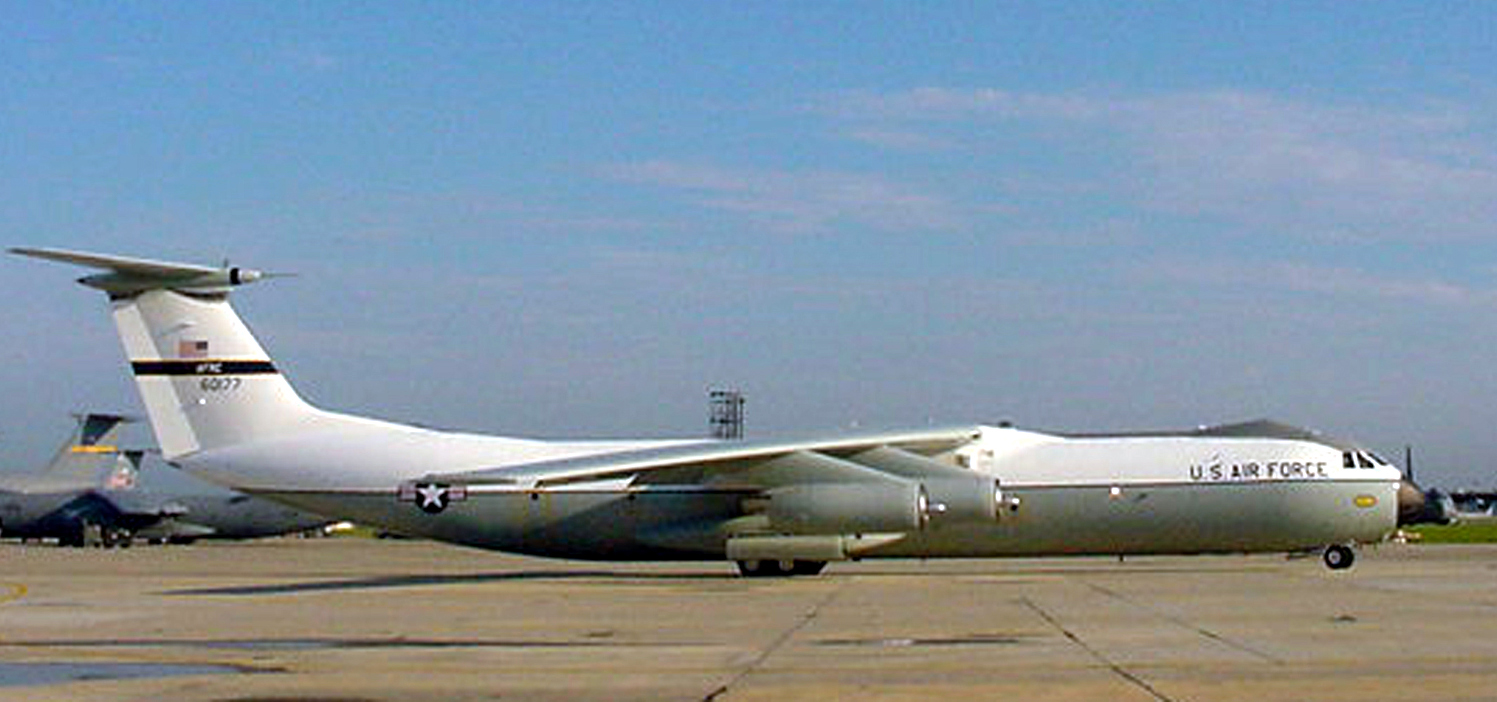
C-141B, AF Ser. No. 66-0177, the Hanoi Taxi, after 2002 repainting to revert to 1970s scheme. Note the stretched fuselage indicating its modification from its earlier C-141A configuration to the C-141B configuration. Other C-141Bs with the standard USAF paint scheme of 2006 can be seen in the background.

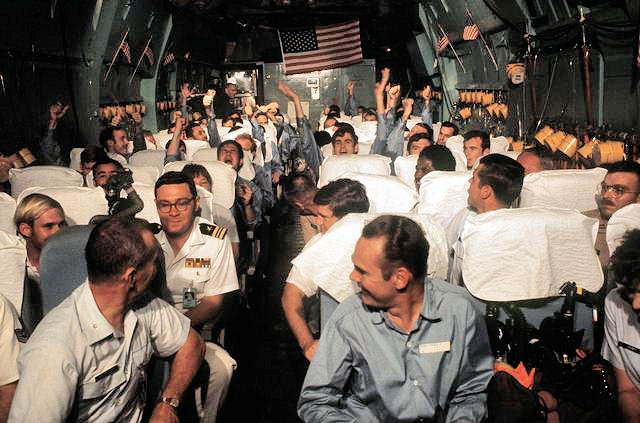
Recently released United States POWs from North Vietnamese prison camps being flown on board the "Hanoi Taxi" from Hanoi, North Vietnam to Clark Air Base, Philippines, March 1973.

By the terms of the 1973 Paris Peace Accords, the cease-fire was to become effective in Vietnam the morning of 28 January 1973, Saigon time. American prisoners in North Vietnam were to be released and the last 23,700 American troops withdrawn from Vietnam within sixty days. Planning for Operation Homecoming, the mission for the return of Americans held by North Vietnam, was given to the Military Airlift Command. C-141s of the 63d Military Airlift Wing, stationed at Norton AFB, California were given responsibility for bringing out the men. On 11 February, two C-130s of TAC's 374th Tactical Airlift Wing flew from Ching Chuan Kang Air Base, Taiwan to Clark AB as primary and spare ships for the movement of the support team to Hanoi the next day. A second C-130 left Tan Son Nhut AB carrying members of the international commission to Hanoi to oversee the repatriations. This C-130 arrived at Gia Lam Airport about one hour before the C-130 from Ching Chuan Kang arrived.

On the ground at Gia Lam, the C-130 crew met the airport manager and went indoors for tea offered by the North Vietnamese. The first of three C-141s flown in from Clark landed soon after and repatriation began. As the first returnee moved from the release desk, one of the C-130 flight engineers quickly moved to clear the way, leading the former prisoner by the arm. Taking the cue, the other C-130 crewmen in the same way escorted each man to the waiting C-141. Over and over, returnees expressed their deepest appreciation at having been greeted by a "brother-in-arms" and, in those first few moments of freedom, welcomed home by their own countrymen. A total of 116 Americans were released at Gia Lam that day and all were flown to Clark by the C-141s. Further releases of Americans in Hanoi followed the pattern of the first day. Releases took place on 18 February and on seven dates in March, ending with the final repatriation of the last sixty-seven men on 29 March 1973.

==== Fall of South Vietnam ====
With the impending Fall of Saigon and the evacuation of American nationals from South Vietnam in April 1975, the Air Force started evacuation flights out of Tan Son Nhut AB. Operation Babylift, the airlift of some two thousand mixed-blood orphans and children of American servicemen and Vietnamese women, most of them destined for homes in the United States, was initiated. Unfortunately, the Babylift missions were marred by the crash of a MAC C-5A shortly after takeoff on 4 April, killing 155 persons, most of them children.

Most of the American and some Vietnamese refugees departed openly aboard military or contract-jet transports, but a few individuals formerly associated with intelligence activities came out semi-covertly through the Air America terminal. On two days, 21 and 22 April, sixty-four hundred persons left Tan Son Nhut for Clark AB aboard thirty-three C-141s and forty-one C-130s. Operations were around-the-clock, the C-141s landing by day and the C-130s generally by night. Other C-141s and the contract carriers meanwhile moved those refugees already at Clark eastward to Guam and Wake Island. Nearly all aircrews reported tracer fire and airbursts with some bursts reaching to eighteen-thousand feet. On 26 and 27 April, twelve-thousand persons left Tan Son Nhut for Clark AB aboard forty-six C-130 and twenty-eight C-141 flights. The intensifying enemy fire forced the decision to stop C-141 landings at Saigon at nightfall on the twenty-seventh, while C-130 flights continued. On 29 April all US fixed-wing evacuation flights from Tan Son Nhut were stopped due to North Vietnamese artillery fire.

MAC subsequently supported Operation New Life (April 1975 – September 1975), the transport to Guam of Vietnamese refugees and their subsequent resettlement.

=== Special Air Mission ===
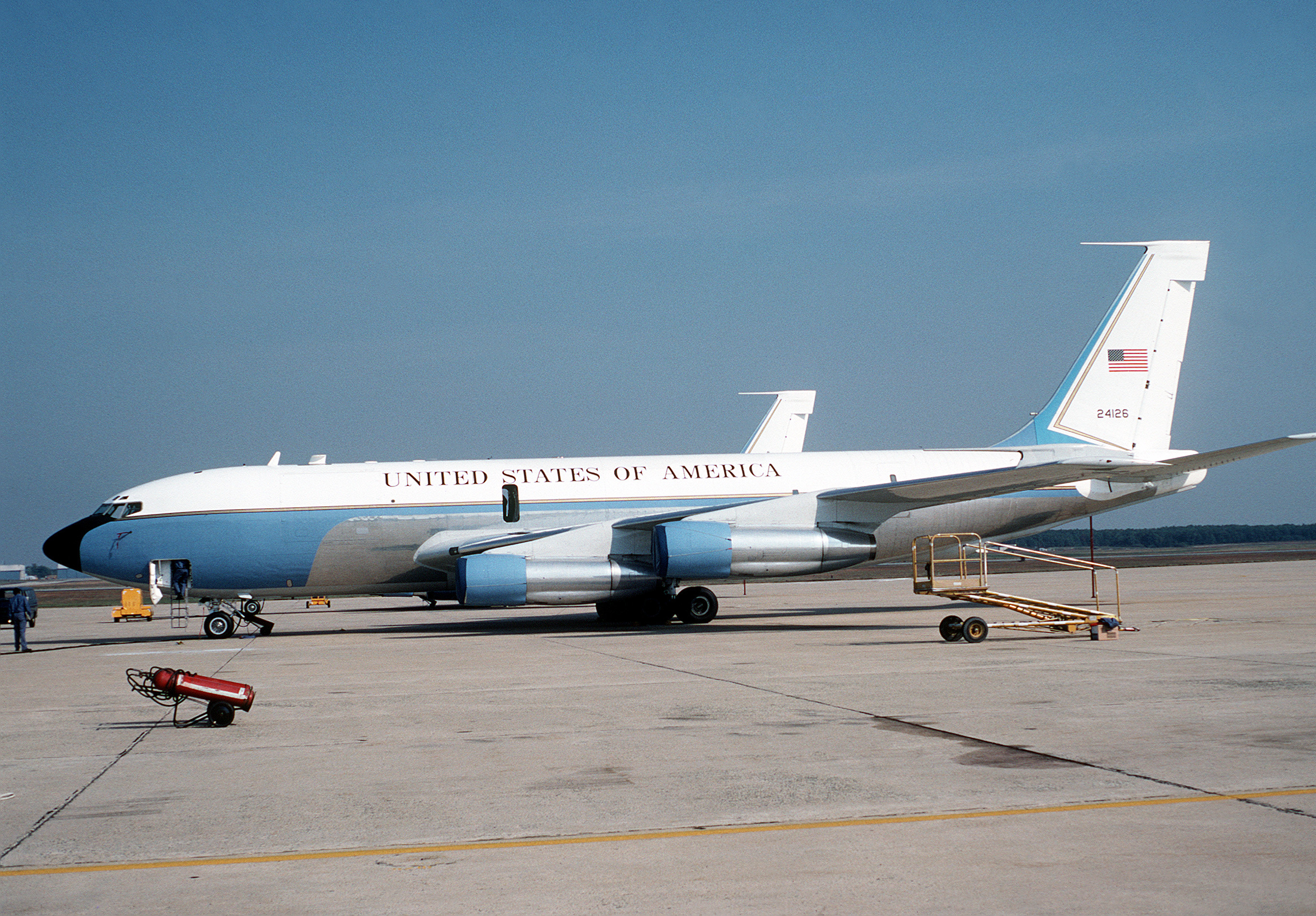
VC-135B Stratolifter, AF Ser. No. 62-4126, used for VIP transport parked on the flight line at Andrews AFB, Maryland

Inherited from MATS, MAC assumed the Special Air Mission (SAM) of providing global airlift, logistics, aerial port and communications for the President, Vice President, and senior government leaders as tasked by the White House and Chief of Staff of the Air Force. The 89th Military Airlift Wing, stationed at Andrews AFB, Maryland carried out this mission on a worldwide basis.

=== Operation Nickel Grass ===
When the 1973 October War began, the Israeli Armed Forces' stocks of munitions and other consumables were rapidly drained. One of the most critical but least celebrated airlifts in history unfolded over a desperate 32 days in the fall of 1973. Operation Nickel Grass was the United States' effort to ship thousands of tons of materiel over vast distances into the midst of the most ferocious fighting the Middle East had ever witnessed. MAC C-141 and C-5 transport aircraft went in harm's way, vulnerable to attack from fighters, as they carved a demanding track across the Mediterranean, and to missiles and sabotage, as they were off-loading in Israel.

The airlift proved key to the Israeli victory. It had not only brought about the timely resupply of the Israeli armed forces but also provided a series of deadly new weapons put to good use in the latter part of the war. These included the AGM-65 Maverick, the BGM-71 TOW anti-tank weapons and extensive new electronic countermeasures equipment that warded off successful attacks on Israeli fighters. Reflecting on the operation's vital contribution to the war effort, Reader's Digest would call it "The Airlift That Saved Israel."

The airlift taught the Air Force many lessons, large and small. With refueling denied for MAC airlift flights bound for Israel by France and West Germany, Lajes Field in the Azores had to be used instead. The Air Force established an immediate requirement for aerial refueling to become standard practice in MAC so that its airlifters could operate without forward bases, if necessary.

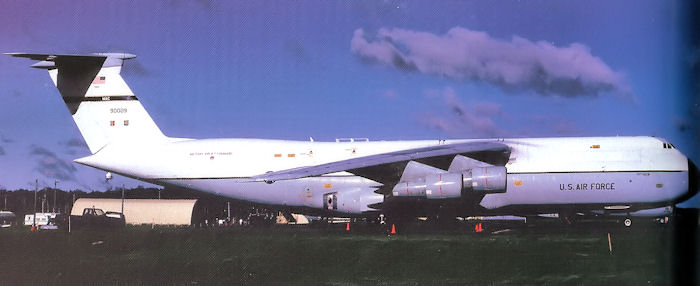
C-5A (AF Ser. No. 69-0009) of the 60 MAW, Travis AFB, California, circa 1973

The C-5 Galaxy proved to be one of the finest military airlift aircraft in history, not the expensive military mistake as it had been portrayed in the media. Since its introduction in 1970, the C-5A had been plagued by problems. The Air Force claimed to have rectified the problems, but the C-5A was still viewed by the press as an expensive failure. During Nickel Grass, C-5s carried 48% of the total cargo in only 145 of the 567 total missions. The C-5A also carried "outsize" cargo such as M60 Patton tanks, M109 howitzers, ground radar systems, mobile tractor units, CH-53 Sea Stallion helicopters, and A-4 Skyhawk components; cargo that could not fit in smaller aircraft. This performance justified the C-5's existence, and allowed the Air Force to move forward with their proposed upgrade to the C-5B variant.

=== Tactical Airlift ===
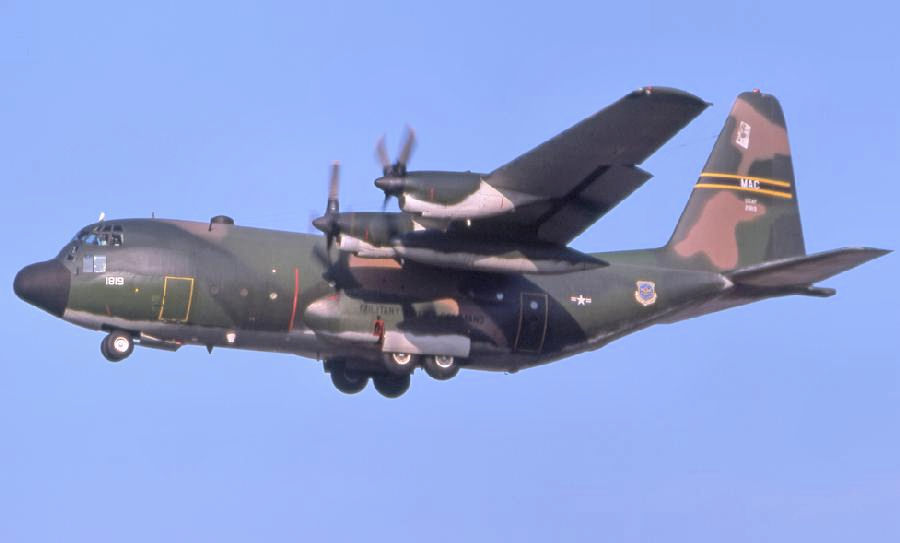
C-130E Hercules, AF Ser. No 62-1819

It was found during the Vietnam War that there was a large duplication of aerial port facilities and mission objectives between MAC, Tactical Air Command (TAC) and Pacific Air Forces (PACAF). A study group recommended the consolidation of all tactical airlift forces as a cost-saving measure under MAC. On 1 December 1974, all TAC C-130 Tactical Airlift Wings were reassigned to MAC. In 1975, PACAF and USAFE Tactical Airlift Wings were also reassigned to MAC, thus ending the theater troop carrier mission as it had existed since the beginning of World War II.

As a result, MAC became the controlling Major Command for C-130 wings at Little Rock and Pope AFB and the 433 TAW at Kelly AFB became a MAC tenant unit. With the impending arrival of the 1st Tactical Fighter Wing (1 TFW) from MacDill AFB and their standup of USAF's first F-15 Eagle aircraft at Langley AFB, the 316 TAW at Langley was inactivated in 1975 with one squadron from the 316th reassigned to the 62d MAW at McChord AFB and the rest of the wing's aircraft reassigned throughout MAC, AFRES and the Air National Guard. MAC also assumed command of Tactical Airlift Wings at Clark AB (374 TAW) in the Pacific and the 513 TAW at RAF Mildenhall and the 435 TAW at Rhein-Main AB in Europe, with these MAC overseas wings becoming tenant units under PACAF and USAFE.

=== C-141/C-5 Upgrade Programs ===
During the Vietnam War era, the C-141A was found to "bulk out" (e.g., exceeded max cubic foot in the cargo bay) before it "massed out" (e.g., exceeded max gross weight of cargo in the cargo bay), meaning that it often had additional lift capacity that went wasted because the cargo hold was too full. To correct the perceived deficiencies of the original model and utilize the C-141 to the fullest of its capabilities, the entire fleet of 270 in-service C-141As were stretched, adding needed payload volume.

These modified aircraft were designated C-141B. Additional 'plug' sections were added before and after the wings, lengthening the fuselage by 23 ft 4 in (7.11 m) and allowing the carriage of 103 litters for wounded, 13 standard pallets, 205 troops, 168 paratroopers, or an equivalent increase in other loads. Also added at this time was a boom receptacle for inflight refueling which gave the C-141 truly intercontinental range. The conversion program took place between 1977 and 1982, with first delivery taking place in December 1979. It was estimated that this stretching program was the equivalent of buying 90 new aircraft, in terms of increased capacity.

During its development phase, problems with the C-5 had been discovered, including structural problems that required the replacement of wing sections. During the early 1980s, the C-5A force was retrofitted with a new wing to strengthen the aircraft and allow it to carry additional cargo loads. Also, a shortage of airlift capability was addressed with the introduction of the C-5B, The first C-5B incorporating significant improvements such as strengthened wings and updated avionics was delivered to Altus Air Force Base in January 1986. C-5B production concluded with delivery of the last "B" model aircraft in April 1989.

A third C-5 variant, the C-5C was developed for transporting large cargo. Two C-5As (68-0213 and 68-0216) were modified to have a larger internal cargo capacity to accommodate large payloads, such as satellites for use by NASA and the National Reconnaissance Office.

=== Cold War Operations ===
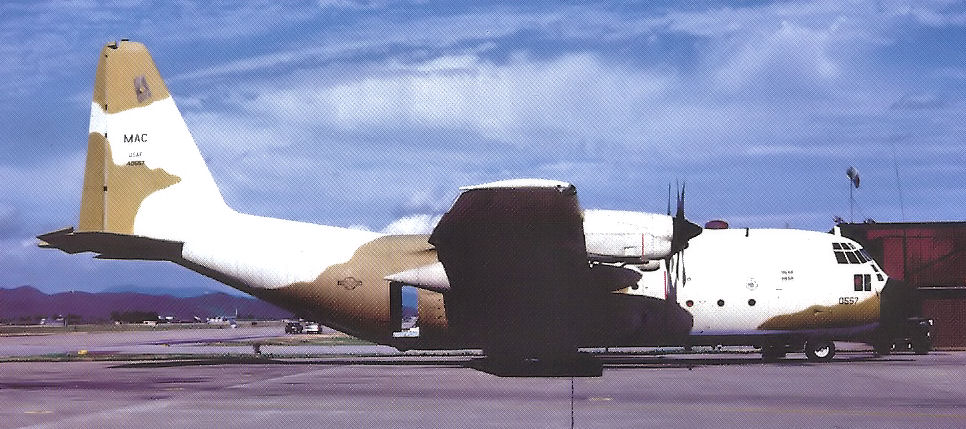
The United States Rapid Deployment Joint Task Force (RDJTF) of the early 1980s led to this prototype desert scheme shown on this Little Rock AFB-based C-130E, AF Ser. No. 64-0557, assigned to the 314 TAW

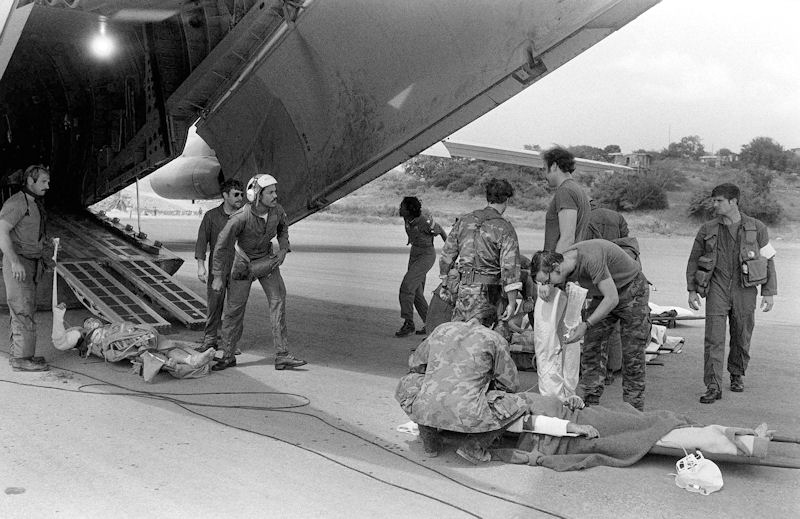
A wounded soldier is treated by U.S. military personnel before being placed aboard a C-141B Starlifter aircraft for medical evacuation during Operation Urgent Fury in Grenada

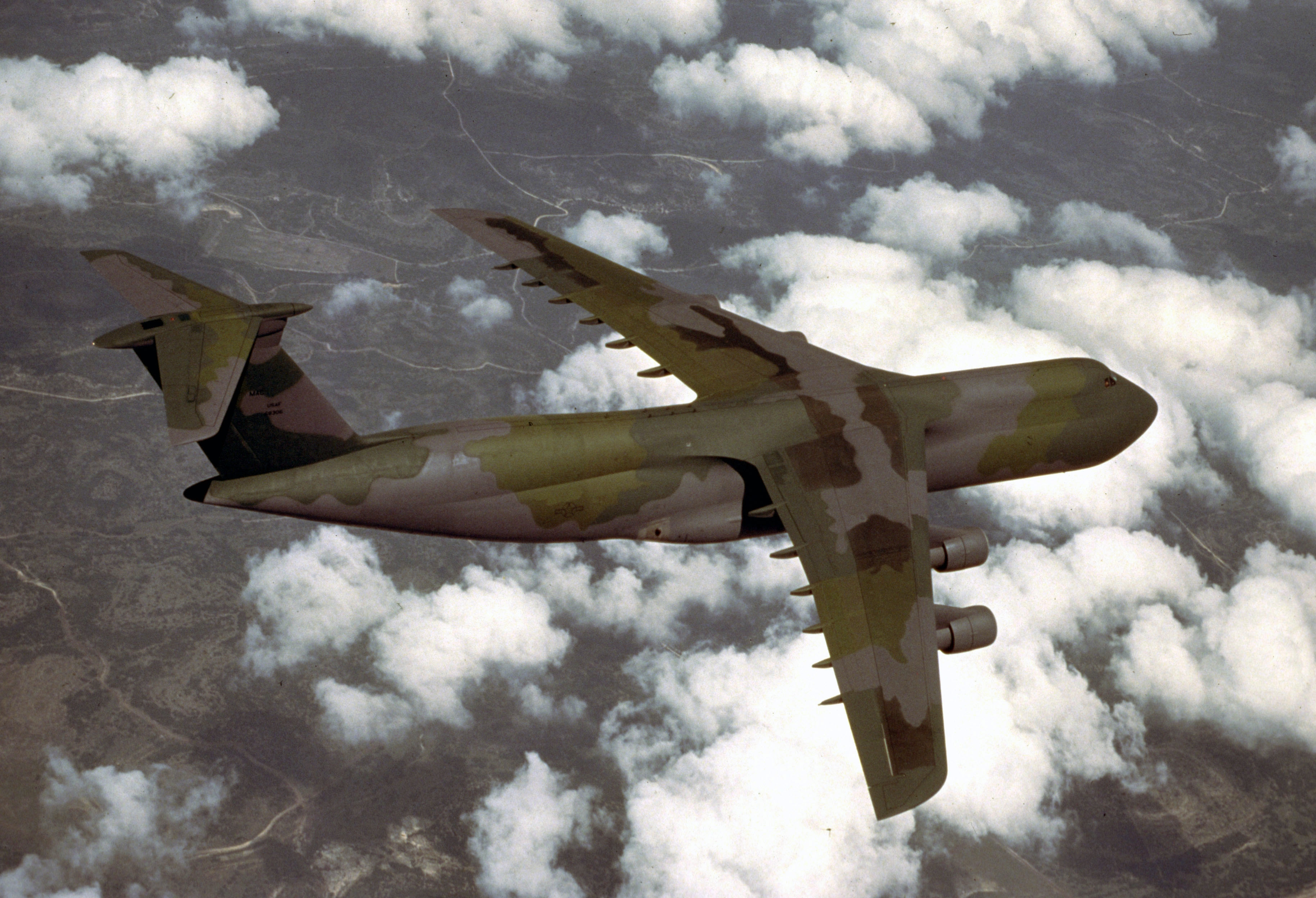
C-5A Galaxy, AF Ser. No. 66-0386

After the Vietnam War ended, MAC returned to a training role, though it continued to operate the worldwide route structure to support United States interests around the world. With the tactical airlift mission now part of MAC, emphasis on tactical operations was increased. While C-130s were assigned an increased logistical role C-141 and C-5 crews were given training in tactical procedures as more emphasis was placed on deployment.

==== NATO Support ====
In addition to the forces in the Pacific, MAC operated air transshipment facilities on USAFE bases in the European and North African AORs. These were:

- Wheelus Air Base, Libya, (623d MASS) (Closed 1969)
- Torrejon Air Base, Spain, (625th MASS)
- RAF Mildenhall, England, (627th MASS)
- Incirlik Air Base, Turkey, (628th MASS)
- Hellenikon Air Base, Greece, (629th MASS)
- Rhein-Main Air Base, West Germany, (630th MASS)

Ramstein Air Base, West Germany, (Det. 1, 630th MASS)

- Lajes Field, Azores, (1605th MASS)

Annual Exercise REFORGER deployments of United States Army forces to West Germany was intended to ensure that NATO had the ability to quickly deploy forces to West Germany in the event of a conflict with the Soviet Union. MAC C-5 and C-141 aircraft transported entire units of Army infantry, artillery and mechanized personnel yearly after some forces were withdrawn back to the United States. Reforger was conducted annually until just after the end of the Cold War.

In addition, Operation Bright Star deployment airlifts to Egypt, beginning in 1981 were flown by MAC C-5 and C-141 aircraft. Bright Star was a series of biennial combined and joint training exercises by American and Egyptian forces. These deployments were designed to strengthen ties between the Egyptian and American militaries and demonstrate and enhance the ability of the Americans to reinforce their allies in the Middle East in the event of war.

==== Operation Urgent Fury ====
In 1983 the United States invaded the tiny island of Grenada. Code-named Operation Urgent Fury, the invasion tasked MAC for planning a military combat operation using its tactical M/C-130 wings. Though the outcome of the conflict was assured, many problems occurred during the assault. There was confusion among the initial assault force of special operations MC-130s and conventional airlifter C-130s, confusion that resulted in a lightly armed force of US Army Ranger headquarters troops parachuting onto the airfield at Point Salines without their heavier weapons. Once the airfield was secured, C-141s began landing with 82nd Airborne Division paratroopers to reinforce the Rangers.

==== Operation Just Cause ====
During Christmas Week 1989, MAC transports dropped paratroopers onto key military points in Panama after a US serviceman was killed by Panamanian soldiers. Operation Just Cause, the United States invasion of Panama saw MAC C-141s being flown performing an Army combat parachute drop. The drop formation included C-130s as well as C-141s. The US forces quickly overwhelmed the Panamanian military and soon captured the Panamanian dictator, Manuel Noriega, and brought him to the United States to stand trial.

==== Special Operations ====
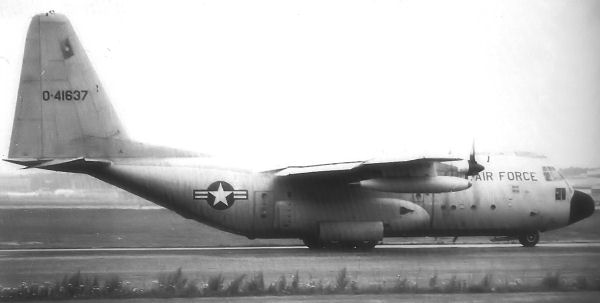
Lockheed C-130A-LM Hercules, AF Serial No. 54-1637, of the 7406th Operations Squadron. This aircraft was later converted to GC-130A. It is now at Goodfellow AFB as ground trainer.

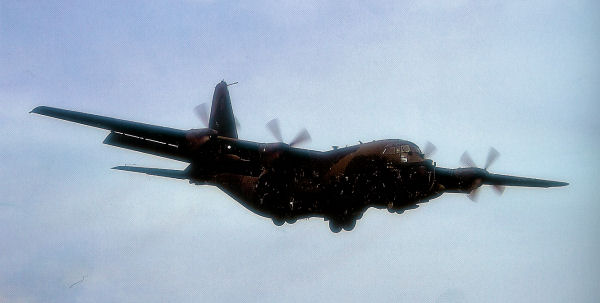
MC-130E of the 7th Special Operations Squadron

Beginning in World War II, special operations utilizing transport aircraft were a part of the USAAF mission. Troop Carrier Command (TCC) C-47 squadrons worked with the Office of Strategic Services (OSS) in Europe, Asia and other regions flying clandestine missions behind enemy lines.

In the 1950s, the MATS Air Resupply And Communications Service (ARCS) controlled special operations forces during the Korean War and throughout the 1950s supporting both DoD as well as CIA activities. MATS worked closely with the USAF Special Air Warfare Center (later, USAF Special Operations Force) in the 1960s and early years of the Vietnam War.

After 1964, Special Operations were assigned to Tactical Air Command's Ninth Air Force, and when the war in Vietnam ended, the special operations forces were cut back along with the rest of the military.

The ill-fated Operation Eagle Claw Iranian rescue mission in April 1980 led to a resurgence of emphasis on long-range special operations teams whose mission would be primarily to conduct operations such as the rescue of hostages. A new special operations force was created under the Ninth Air Force, and based at Hurlburt Field, Florida, but the mission soon transferred to the Military Airlift Command where it became the Twenty-Third Air Force on 10 February 1983.

Twenty-Third Air Force units both in Europe (Rhein-Main Air Base, RAF Mildenhall) and Japan (Yokota Air Base supported various clandestine missions throughout the 1980s, flying specially-equipped MC-130s.

===== Special Operations Divestiture =====
On 22 May 1990, Twenty-Third Air Force was redesignated as Air Force Special Operations Command (AFSOC) and elevated to the major command (MAJCOM) level, with all Air Force special operations aircraft, installations and personnel, to include those "operationally-gained" special operations aircraft, installations and personnel in the Air Force Reserve and Air National Guard, transferred to AFSOC.

=== Gulf War ===
As a response to the Iraq invasion of Kuwait in August 1990, President Bush responded by dispatching American armed forces to Saudi Arabia to protect the kingdom and the oilfields vital to the western industrial nations. The 82nd Airborne Division began moving by air from its base at Fort Bragg, North Carolina to the Saudi desert. MAC's entire force of C-141s and C-5s was dedicated to the airlift, including Air Force Reserve and Air National Guard aircraft and crews who were called to active duty.

MAC C-130s were deployed to Saudi Arabia to support the arriving ground forces as they arrived in-country by air and by ship. Fortunately, Iraq made no move against Saudi Arabia, and the United States and an international coalition was able to build up a massive military force that eventually drove the Iraqis out of Kuwait.

=== Inactivation ===
With the end of the Cold War the Air Force reorganized its command structure. A lesson learned from the 1990 Gulf War was that the division of forces as then existed in the USAF led to confusion in actual combat operations. The emphasis on rapid force deployment led the Air Force to reorganize its major commands, with MAC being inactivated on 1 June 1992.

Most of the personnel and equipment formerly assigned to MAC was absorbed by the new Air Mobility Command (AMC), which was activated the same day. AMC also assumed control of most of the former Strategic Air Command (SAC) aerial refueling fleet that same day, to include all KC-10 Extender aircraft and most KC-135 Stratotanker aircraft, the only exceptions being those KC-135s that were transferred to U.S. Air Forces in Europe (USAFE), Pacific Air Forces (PACAF) and Air Education and Training Command (AETC).

=== Lineage ===
Air Transport Command

- Constituted as the Air Corps Ferrying Command on 29 May 1941

Redesignated: Army Air Forces Ferry Command on 9 March 1942
Redesignated: Army Air Forces Ferrying Command on 31 March 1942
Redesignated: Air Transport Command on 1 July 1942
Inactivated, on 1 June 1948

- Consolidated with Military Airlift Command as Military Airlift Command on 13 May 1982

Military Airlift Command

- Established as Military Air Transport Service on 1 June 1948 and activated

Redesignated Military Airlift Command on 1 January 1966
Designated a specified command on 1 February 1977

- Consolidated with Military Air Transport Service on 13 May 1982

Lost specified command status on 1 October 1988
Inactivated on 1 June 1992

- Consolidated with Air Mobility Command as Air Mobility Command on 1 October 2016

=== Components ===
==== Headquarters ====
- Headquarters, MAC

Scott AFB, Illinois, 1 January 1966 – 1 June 1992.

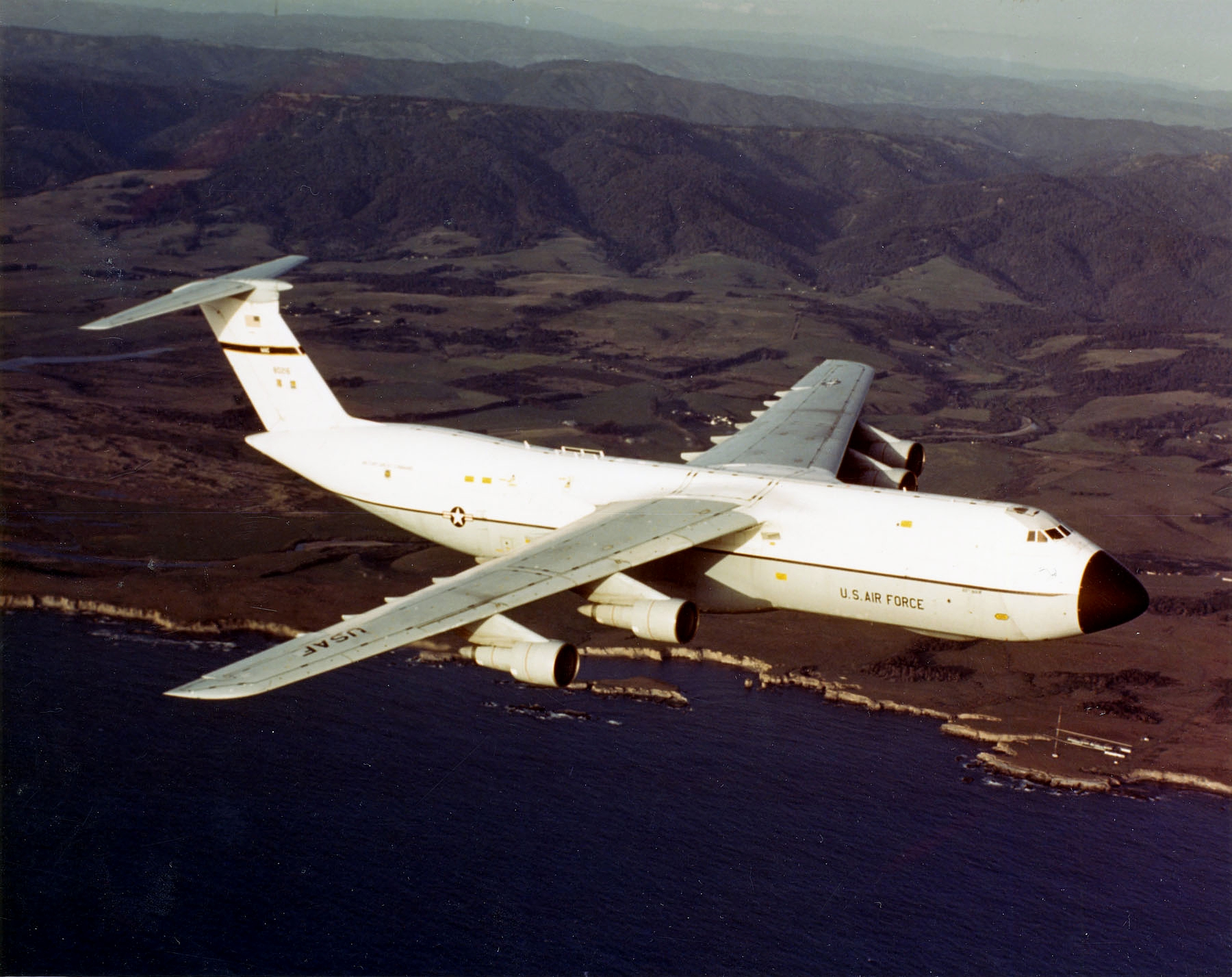
C-5A Galaxy assigned to the 75th Military Airlift Squadron, 60th Military Airlift Wing

- Twenty-First Air Force

McGuire AFB, New Jersey, 3 January 1966 – 1 June 1992.

- Twenty-Second Air Force

Travis AFB, California, 8 January 1966 – 1 June 1992

- Twenty-Third Air Force

Scott AFB, Illinois, 1 March 1983 – 22 May 1990,
Redesignated Air Force Special Operations Command, with the status of a major command

==== Services ====
- Air Weather Service, 1 January 1966 – 30 June 1991
- Air Rescue Service, 1 January 1966

Redesignated: Aerospace Rescue and Recovery Service, 8 January 1966 – 30 June 1991

- Air Photographic and Charting Service, 1 January 1966 – 1972

==== Divisions ====
- 2d Air Division, Hurlburt Field, Florida, 1 March 1983 – 1 February 1987
- 76th Airlift Division, Andrews Air Force Base, Maryland, 1 March 1976

Redesignated 76th Military Airlift Wing, 30 September 1977
Redesignated 76th Airlift Division, 15 December 1980 – 1 October 1985

- 322d Airlift Division, High Wycombe Air Station, United Kingdom, 1 January 1966 – 24 December 1968; Ramstein Air Base, Germany, 3 June 1978 – 1 April 1992
- 832d Air Division, Sewart Air Force Base, Tennessee, 1–31 December 1974
- 834th Airlift Division, Hickam Air Force Base, Hawaii, 1 October 1978 – 1 April 1991, Little Rock Air Force Base, Arkansas, 1–31 December 1974 (as 834th Air Division)

==== Military Airlift Units ====
Operated C-141 Starlifter or C-5 Galaxy aircraft

- 60th Military Airlift Wing, Travis AFB, California, 8 January 1966

Redesignated: 60d Airlift Wing, 1 November 1991 – 1 June 1992

- 62d Military Airlift Wing, McChord AFB, Washington, 8 January 1966

Redesignated: 62d Airlift Wing, 1 December 1991 – 1 June 1992

- 63d Military Airlift Wing, Norton AFB, California, 8 January 1966

Redesignated: 63d Airlift Wing, 1 January-1 Jun 1992

- 436th Military Airlift Wing, Dover AFB, Delaware, 8 January 1966

Redesignated: 436th Airlift Wing, 1 December 1991 – 1 June 1992

- 437th Military Airlift Wing, Charleston AFB, South Carolina, 8 January 1966

Redesignated: 437th Airlift Wing, 1 October 1991 – 1 June 1992

- 438th Military Airlift Wing, McGuire AFB, New Jersey, 8 January 1966

Redesignated: 438th Airlift Wing, 1 November 1991 – 1 June 1992

- 443d Military Airlift Wing (Training)

Tinker AFB, Oklahoma, 8 January 1966
Altus AFB, Oklahoma, 5 May 1969
Redesignated: 443d Airlift Wing, 27 August 1991 – 1 June 1992

==== Tactical Airlift Units ====
Operated C-130 Hercules aircraft

- 314th Tactical Airlift Wing, Little Rock AFB, Arkansas, 31 December 1974

Redesignated: 314th Airlift Wing, 1 November 1991 – 1 June 1992

- 316th Tactical Airlift Wing, Langley AFB, Virginia, 31 December 1974 – 30 June 1975

Andrews AFB, Maryland, 15 December 1980 – 12 July 1991

- 317th Tactical Airlift Wing, Pope AFB, North Carolina, 31 December 1974

Redesignated: 317th Airlift Wing, 1 January-1 Jun 1992

- 463d Tactical Airlift Wing, Dyess AFB, Texas, 31 December 1974

Redesignated: 463d Airlift Wing-1 November 1991 – 1 June 1992

==== Other Airlift Units ====
- 89th Military Airlift Wing, Andrews AFB, Maryland, 8 January 1966 (Special Air Mission)

Redesignated: 89th Military Airlift Group, 30 September 1977
Redesignated: 89th Military Airlift Wing, 15 December 1980
Redesignated: 89th Airlift Wing, 12 July 1991 – 1 June 1992

- 65th Military Airlift Group^, Yokota AB, Japan, 14 August 1967 (PACAF Operations)

Redesignated: 65th Military Airlift Support Group^, 24 December 1968 – 1 January 1972
Replaced by: 610th Military Airlift Support Squadron^, 1 January 1972 – 1 October 1978
MAC operations at Yokota operated by MAC/TA Section, 475th Air Base Wing (PACAF) 1 October 1978 – 1 October 1989

- 69th Military Airlift Support Group^, Clark AB, Philippines, 8 January 1966 (PACAF Operations)

Redesignated: 69th Military Airlift Support Squadron^, 1 January 1972
Replaced by: 374th Tactical Airlift Wing, 31 March 1975
Reassigned: Yokota AB, Japan, 1 October 1989 – 1 April 1992

- 435th Military Airlift Support Wing, RAF High Wycombe, England, 24 December 1968 (USAFE Operations)

Reassigned: Rhein-Main AB, West Germany (later Germany), 1 July 1969 – 1 June 1992
Redesignated: 435th Tactical Airlift Wing, 1 July 1975
Redesignated: 435th Airlift Wing, 1 April 1992

Note: ^Commanded by: 61st Military Airlift Support Wing, Hickam AFB, Hawaii.

=== Major Aircraft ===
- C-47 Skytrain, 1975–1976; 1983–1990
- C-54 Skymaster, 1966–1975
- C-121 Constellation, 1966–1978
- C-124 Globemaster II, 1966–1974
- C-130 Hercules, 1974–1992
- AC-130 Spectre, 1983–1990
- HC-130 Hercules, 1964–1992
- MC-130 Combat Talon & Combat Shadow, 1983–1990
- WC-130 Hercules, 1962–1992
- C-133 Cargomaster, 1966–1971
- C-135 Stratolifter, 1966–1992
- C-140 Jetstar, 1961–1992
- C-141 Starlifter, 1966–1992
- C-5 Galaxy, 1970–1992
- C-9 Nightingale, 1968–1992
- Boeing VC-137, 1961–1992 (Air Force One / Air Force Two / Special Assignment Airlift Mission (SAAM)
- Boeing VC-25, 1990–1992 (Air Force One)

source for lineage, assignments, stations, components, aircraft

== See also ==
- Military Air Transport Service
- Air Mobility Command
- Air Resupply And Communications Service
