= City of Labour Valour =

City honorary title in the Russian Federation

- Date: March 1, 2020
- Country: Russia

City of Labour Valour (Russian: Город трудовой доблести, romanized: Gorod trudovoy doblesti) is a Russian honorary title assigned to cities who had an outstanding record of uninterrupted production of military and civilian products at industrial enterprises during World War II (known in most former republics of the Soviet Union as the Great Patriotic War). It was established by federal law dated to 1 March 2020. The title is awarded by decree of the President of the Russian Federation. It was created as part of the diamond jubilee celebrations of the end of the war in 2020. It was awarded to twenty Russian cities. This distinction corresponds to the distinction of Hero City and City of Military Glory.

There are many privileges that come with being awarded with the title. In a city that was awarded the title, a stele is installed with the coat of arms of the city. On public events such as Labour Day, Victory Day (9 May) and their individual City Day, the city is entitled to host a fireworks show.

== History ==
Initiatives to establish an honorary title for Russian cities, whose inhabitants performed a labor feat during the years of the war were repeatedly put forward by Russian public and political figures. In 2009, the non-profit partnership Interstate Union of Hero Cities established the public honorary international title "City of Labor Valor and Glory" and approved the provision on this title. This public title was awarded by the non-profit partnership to a number of cities. Draft federal laws were introduced to the State Duma at one point by deputies of such as Valentin Varennikov and Valery Vostrotin, members of the Federation Council and even at the local level by members of the Legislative Assembly of the Chelyabinsk Region. In 2017, the initiative to establish the honorary title “City of Labor Glory” was submitted and published on the portal Russian Public Initiative. In the first half of 2019, the State Duma and the State Council of the Udmurt Republic introduced the draft federal law for the award that was submitted in 14 December to President Vladimir Putin. In July 2020, the title “City of Labor Valor” was awarded to 20 cities of the Russian Federation: Nizhny Novgorod, Yekaterinburg, Chelyabinsk, Samara, Perm, Nizhny Tagil, Saratov, Omsk, Kazan, Novosibirsk, Borovichi, Ivanovo, Izhevsk, Irkutsk, Magnitogorsk, Novokuznetsk, Tomsk, Ulyanovsk, Ufa and Yaroslavl. It was amended again in May 2021: Barnaul, Kamensk-Uralsky, Kirov, Kolomna, Komsomolsk-on-Amur, Krasnoyarsk, Magadan, Penza, Rybinsk, Severodvinsk, Tyumen and Cheboksary.

== See also ==
- Medal "For Labour Valour"
- Order of Labour Glory
