= Alley of Immortality (Taganrog) =

Memorial square in Taganrog, Russia

Аллея Бессмертия (Таганрог)
- Аллея Бессмертия (Таганрог) (Russian)
- Location within Rostov Oblast Location within Russia
- 47.2531°N 38.9094°E
- Type: landmark
- Location: Taganrog, Rostov oblast Russia

History
- Built: 1969

The Alley of Immortality is a memorial square located in the park adjacent to Taganrog's school №34. Small parcels of earth gathered from the USSR's Hero Cities and other historically significant places have been collected and arranged to form the plaza. The Alley of Immortality is a place for holding memorable services and laying flowers.

== History ==
Alley of Immortality was created in 1969 in a grove called Dubki (ru:Роща «Дубки») at the initiative of veterans of war of the Baltic Fleet and members of the Komsomol committee construction trust №1. Four urns with earth were delivered from Petrushina (where about ten thousand people, mostly from Taganrog, were executed by Nazis), Sambek Heights and Krasnodon. The alley was then demarcated by planting trees to separate it from the surrounding park.

In subsequent years land from other hero cities, including Star City (from the monument to Yuri Gagarin), and from the other historical places was added to the Alley. Capsules with land were accompanied by relevant inscriptions.

In the spring 1985 it was decided to move alley of immortality into the square next to school №34. Stela was installed there, where was written “Here lies the sacred land of hero cities and other legendary places in memory of the heroic deed of the Soviet people in the Great Patriotic War.” Next to stela the land collected from the old alley was laid in the special capsules.

Over the next years, the memorial was not well-maintained, and fell into ruin. But in August 2007 the complex was restored and a five-ton stone was added with an embedded plaque reading:

Alley of Immortality. In this alley, under these trees, the land of the Hero Cities of Moscow, Leningrad, Volgograd, Sevastopol, Odessa, Kyiv, the heroic Brest Fortress and other places of military glory is stored. The feat of the people in the Great Patriotic War is immortal! The alley was laid in October 1969. It was restored in August 2007.
