= Malcolm Harvey =

American murderer

- Born: Malcolm Abdul Harvey; August 1972; Natchez, Mississippi, U.S.
- Died: August 22, 2016 (aged 44); Stone Mountain, Georgia, U.S.

Details
- Victims: 2+
- Span of crimes: March 4 – April 16, 1992 (known)
- Country: Spain
- State: Zaragoza

Malcolm Abdul Harvey (August 1972 – August 22, 2016) was an American police officer and former sheriff of Stone Mountain, Georgia, who was posthumously identified as the killer of two women in Zaragoza, Spain, committed in March and April 1992. At the time of the crimes, Harvey served in the United States Army and was stationed at the Zaragoza Air Base, which was shut down a few months later. He was never brought to trial for the killings, as he died two years prior to his identification.

== Murders ==
In the early hours of March 4 to 5, 1992, 25-year-old Mercedes Lazáro Sanmiguel, an employee of the Department of Industry, Commerce and Tourism, drove back to her apartment in Zaragoza after spending most of the day with friends. At the time, her parents, who lived with her, were visiting the town of Teruel to celebrate Cincomarzada, leaving Lazáro all by herself. After parking her Renault 5 in the family garage, she was ambushed by Harvey in the elevator, who proceeded to choke her to death. Upon doing so, he dragged the body to a corner of the garage, covered it up with her raincoat and stole Lazáro's shoes and purse, before promptly leaving the crime scene. On the following day, her parents returned to Zaragoza, and after searching for Lazáro for some time, her father eventually found her body and notified the authorities. An autopsy determined her cause of death to be strangulation, with no apparent signs of sexual assault.

Approximately half a month later, on April 16, 22-year-old teacher Eva María Aznárez Morenilla was attacked by Harvey when she arrived at her apartment complex. During the assault, Aznárez was struck with a wrench and fell to the ground, whereupon she was strangled to death. However, before he could steal anything from her, Harvey was seen by the complex's security guard, which prompted him to flee. As Aznárez's murder shared great similarities to the murder of Lazáro, the two murders were quickly linked together.

=== Investigation ===
Over the following years, several suspects were investigated and some even arrested on suspicion for the two murders, but no charges were brought against any of them. Investigators at the time deduced that the perpetrator was likely a foreigner - at the time, immigration in Zaragoza was low and there were few young black men who fit the description of the man fleeing the Aznárez crime scene. In addition to this, the discovery of a pendant typically worn by an American unit which had been stationed at the Naval Air Station Sigonella in Sicily, Italy, further narrowed down the suspect list to officers serving at the Zaragoza Air Base. Other factors that led to the cases being linked together included that both victims were young, blonde white women of medium height; both were committed on a public holiday (Cincomarzada and Maundy Thursday, respectively); neither involved sexual assault; both had been strangled using a choking technique that was not taught in the Spanish Armed Forces; and the perpetrator had stolen or attempted to steal the victims' shoes, indicating a possible fetishistic motive.

Due to this, investigators focused their attention on Harvey, the son of a high-ranking lieutenant stationed at the Zaragoza Air Base but was not part of the unit assigned there, as he was noted to be absent from the base at the time of the crimes. However, when they went to search for him, they were unable to locate him or positively identify to whom the pendant belonged, and as they lacked concrete evidence to issue an arrest warrant, the investigation was stalled and both cases went cold. In September 1992, the U.S. Air Force ceased operations at the Zaragoza Air Base and all of its personnel and civilians there, including Harvey, were relocated to other areas. Despite this, he later acknowledged his presence at the base and even offered a sample of his DNA and fingerprints, but neither could be conclusively matched at the time. As a result, the statute of limitations for Lazáro and Aznárez's murders expired in 2012, meaning that even if he was linked to the crimes, he could not be charged.

== Death and identification ==
Following the closure of the Zaragoza Air Base, Harvey eventually returned to the United States and at some point moved to Stone Mountain, Georgia. There he worked in the local police department and was even promoted to sheriff, a position in which he served until his death from colon cancer on August 22, 2016, at age 44.

In 2017, prompted by advances in forensic technology and requests from the victims' family members, Judge Rafael Lasala decreed that the murders be reopened and reinvestigated. Soon after, a team of investigators was assembled and started re-examining the cases from scratch, quickly deducing that the injuries suffered by both victims were identical in nature. The way in which they were strangled led them to contact Carlos Alba, an army colonel and jujutsu teacher, who identified the method as a complex maneuver taught in the American military. After months of investigating and gathering clues, investigators officially identified Harvey as the most likely perpetrator in 2018. As a result, both cases were closed and are now considered solved.

As of April 2025, it is unclear whether there are any ongoing investigations to clarify whether Harvey has committed any other violent crimes, either in his native United States or abroad. The pendant found next to Aznárez's body was later sold at a public auction, eliminating the possibility of extracting DNA from it.
