= Stone Mountain, Georgia =

City in Georgia, United States

- City
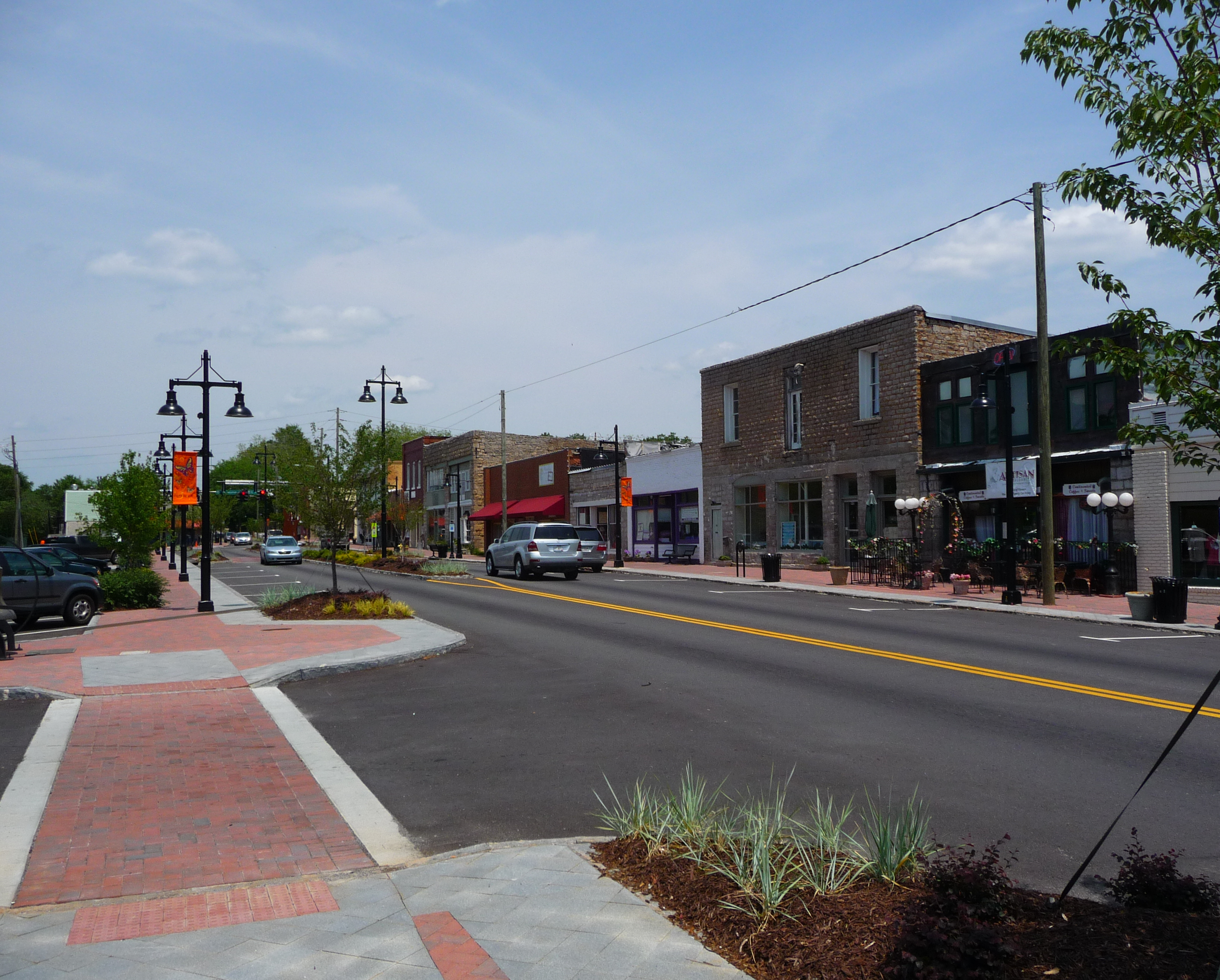
- Main Street in Stone Mountain Village

- Flag Seal
- Motto: "A City of Vision"
- Location in DeKalb County and the state of Georgia

- Location of Stone Mountain in Metro Atlanta
- Coordinates: 33°48′29″N 84°10′13″W
- Country: United States
- State: Georgia
- County: DeKalb
- Established: as New Gibraltar c. 1839
- Renamed: as Stone Mountain c. 1847

Government
  - Mayor: Jeliani Linder

Area
  - Total: 1.66 sq mi (4.29 km^{2})
  - Land: 1.65 sq mi (4.28 km^{2})
  - Water: 0.0039 sq mi (0.01 km^{2})
- Elevation: 1,043 ft (318 m)

Population (2020)
  - Total: 6,703
  - Density: 4,059.5/sq mi (1,567.38/km^{2})
- Time zone: UTC−5 (Eastern (EST))
  - Summer (DST): UTC−4 (EDT)
- ZIP Codes: 30083, 30086–30088
- Area code: 770
- FIPS code: 13-73816
- GNIS feature ID: 0326087
- Website: stonemountaincity.org

Stone Mountain is a city in DeKalb County, Georgia, United States. The population was 6,534 as of 2026. Stone Mountain is in the eastern part of DeKalb County and is a suburb of Atlanta that encompasses nearly 1.7 square miles. It lies near and touches the western base of the geological formation of the same name. Locals often call the city "Stone Mountain Village" to distinguish it from the larger unincorporated area traditionally considered Stone Mountain and Stone Mountain Park.

== History ==
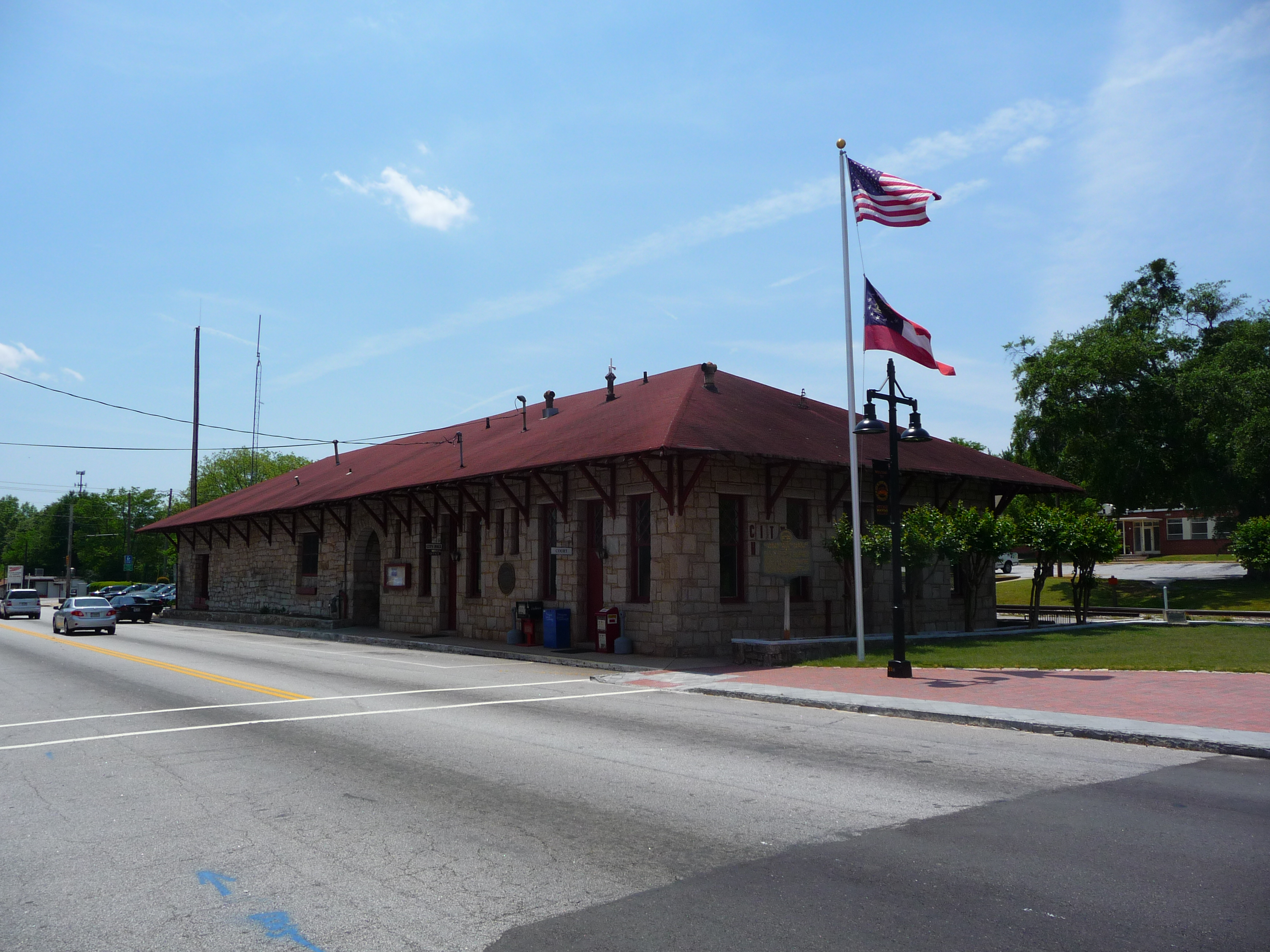
Railroad depot

Stone Mountain's history traces back to before the time of European settlement, with local burial mounds dating back hundreds of years built by the ancestors of the historical Muskogee Creek nation who first met the settlers in the early colonial period.

The Treaty of Indian Springs in 1821 opened a large swath of Georgia for settlement by non-Native Americans on former Creek Indian land, including present-day Stone Mountain Village. In 1822, the area that now makes up the city was made a part of the newly formed DeKalb County.

=== Settlement ===
By the 1820s, Rock Mountain, as it was then called, was "a major travel center", with an inn for travelers. A stagecoach line linking the village with Georgia's capital, Milledgeville, began in 1825. Another stage line ran to Winder and Athens. In 1828 another stage line began trips to Dahlonega, and a fourth connected the community with Macon. "Hundreds of people visited Rock Mountain in the summer [of 1828] and ... a house of entertainment was nearby." Rail service did not reach the town, by then New Gibraltar, until 1845.

A post office was created in 1834 on the old Augusta Road, and Andrew Johnson, called the founder of New Gibraltar and first mayor, around whose house the city limits were drawn, built a hotel along the road in 1836. ("An 1843 amendment to the act of incorporation extended the town limits to 600 yards (550 m) in every direction from the house of Andrew Johnson.") About 1839 Aaron Cloud, who also had a hotel, built a wooden observation tower, octagonal like a lighthouse and 150 feet (46 m) high, along with a restaurant and club, at the mountain's summit. A storm destroyed the tower in 1849; in 1851, Thomas Henry built a smaller, 80 feet (24 m) tower, with telescopes so it could serve as an observatory. Visitors to the mountain traveled by rail and road, then hiked up the 1.3-mile (2.1 km) mountaintop trail to the top. By 1850, Stone Mountain had become a popular destination for Atlanta urbanites who endured the four-hour round trip by rail just to experience its natural beauty, lodging, and attractions.

=== Industry ===
Granite quarrying at the mountain was the area's lifeblood for decades, employing many thousands. The excellent grade of building stone from the mountain was used in many notable structures, including the locks of the Panama Canal, the roof of the bullion depository at Fort Knox, Philadelphia's Liberty National Building, and the steps in the east wing of the U.S. Capitol.

In August 1846, New Gibraltar hosted Georgia's first state fair, then known as the Agriculture Fair and Internal Improvement Jubilee. The fair had just one exhibit—three horses and two cows, both belonging to the event's organizer, John Graves. The next year, the village again hosted the event, which featured caskets, marble, embroidery, brooms, bedspreads, vegetables, blooded stock, wheat, farm tools, and a magnetic telegraph. Stone Mountain hosted the event until 1850, when it moved to Macon.

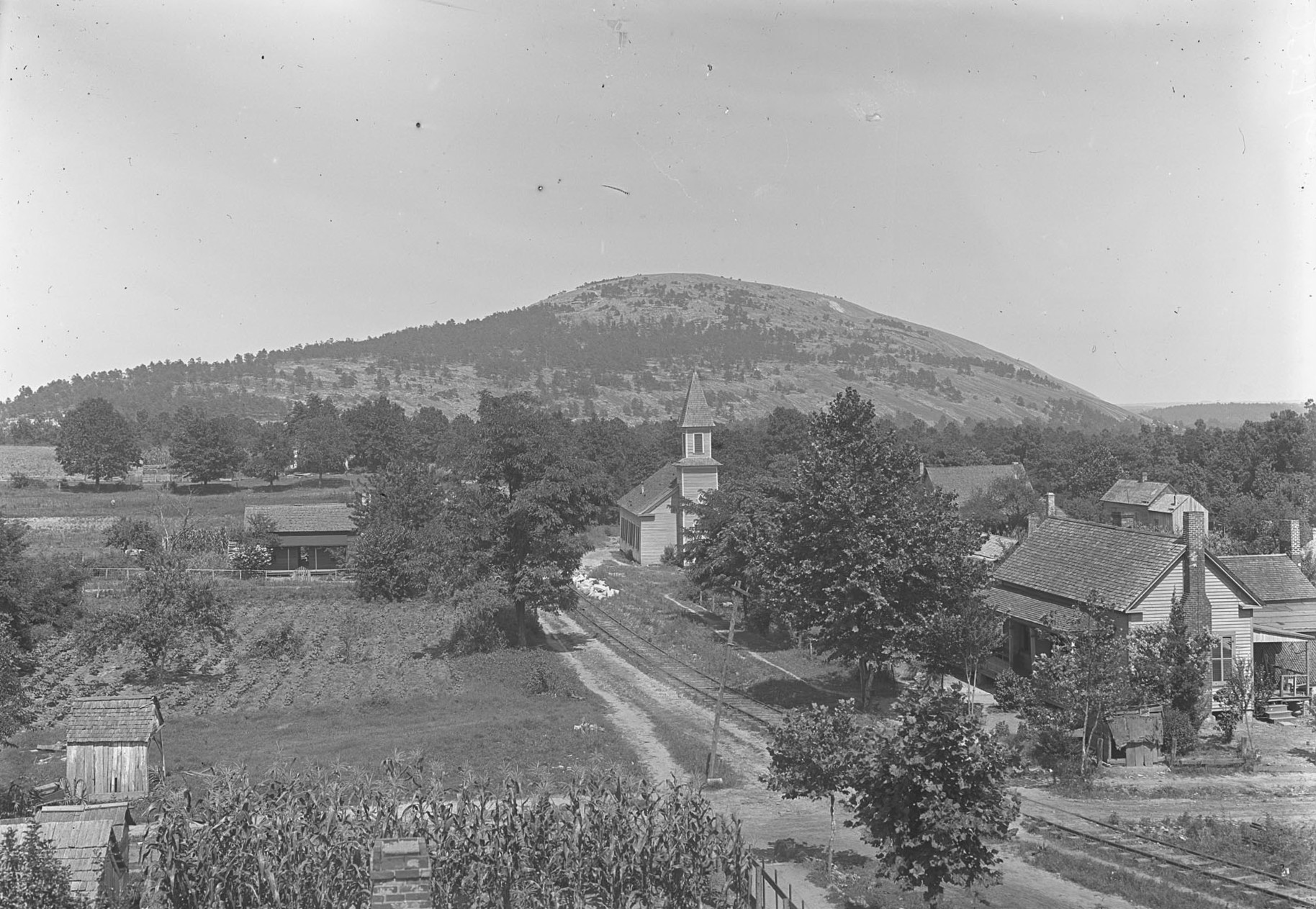
Stone Mountain in 1908

=== American Civil War ===
Though DeKalb County voted against secession from the United States, it was not spared the devastation of the Civil War. Stone Mountain Village went unscathed until the Battle of Atlanta, when it was destroyed by men under the command of General James B. McPherson on July 19, 1864. Several antebellum homes were spared as they were used as hospitals. The railroad depot's roof burned, but the building stood, owing to its 2-foot-thick granite walls.

From the village's destruction in July 1864 until November, Union forces scavenged Stone Mountain and the surrounding area, taking corn, wheat, cotton, cattle, and other goods. On November 15, 1864, between 12,000 and 15,000 Union troops marched through Stone Mountain and further destroyed the rail lines. The rails were rendered useless by heating them over burning railroad ties, then twisting them around trees. The term Sherman's neckties was coined for this form of destruction.

=== Birth of Shermantown ===
Advertisement for Stone Mountain from The Dixie Highway Magazine, c. 1925.

After the Civil War ended, housing in the area was rebuilt as Stone Mountain granite was again in demand for construction across the nation. A significant portion of the quarry's work force were African Americans, but they were generally excluded from areas where white families lived, so a shantytown, Shermantown, came into being at the southeast side of the village; its name was a reference to Union General William T. Sherman.

In 1868, Reverend R. M. Burson organized Bethsaida Baptist Church to serve Shermantown. A church building was then built under Reverend F. M. Simons at what is now 853 Fourth Street. Simons was among a delegation of southern African American pastors to meet with Sherman in Washington, D.C. after the war to discuss the treatment of the freedmen. Bethsaida Baptist is still an active part of the Stone Mountain Village.

By the 20th century, much of Shermantown's original structures had been replaced. Bethsaida's original wooden structure was replaced by stone in 1920. Though Shermantown has mostly integrated into the growing Stone Mountain Village, it retains its own distinct community.

=== Rebirth of the Ku Klux Klan ===
The year 1915 was when the Ku Klux Klan, a white supremacist organization, was reborn. Members assembled at Stone Mountain with permission of quarry owner Samuel Venable, an active member. Their activities, including annual cross-burnings, continued for over 40 years, but Stone Mountain's association with the Klan began to erode when the State of Georgia began to acquire the mountain and surrounding property in 1958. In 1960, Governor Ernest Vandiver condemned the property the state had purchased in order to void the perpetual easements Venable had granted the Klan. This ended any official link between Stone Mountain and the Klan.

=== Civil rights movement ===
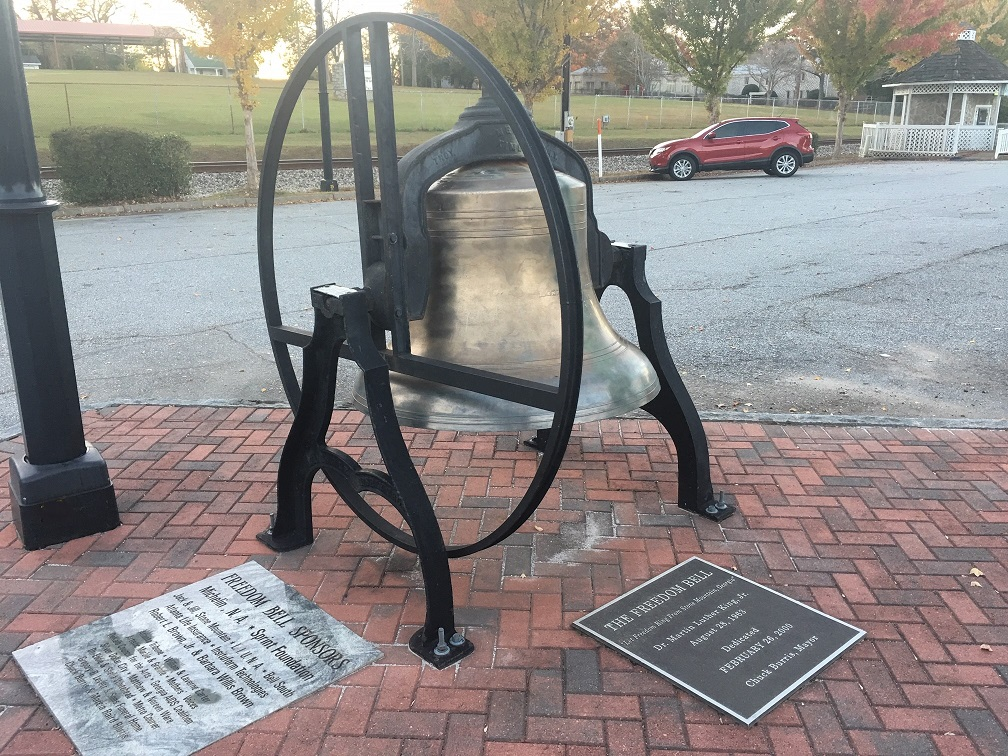
Freedom Bell on Main Street

During the civil rights movement's March on Washington, on August 28, 1963, Martin Luther King Jr. referred to Stone Mountain in his iconic "I Have a Dream" speech when he proclaimed, "let freedom ring from Stone Mountain of Georgia!" Charles Burris, the Village's first African-American mayor, dedicated the Freedom Bell on Main Street in King's honor on February 26, 2000. At an annual ceremony held on Martin Luther King Jr. Day, the bell is rung to commemorate King's legacy.

=== Many names ===
The mountain has been known by countless names throughout the centuries. It was called Crystal Mountain by 16th-century Spanish explorer Juan Pardo when he visited in 1567. The Creek Indians who inhabited the area at that time used a name translating to "Lone Mountain". Around the turn of the 19th century, settlers called it Rock Mountain or Rock Fort Mountain. By the end of the 1830s, Stone Mountain had become the generally accepted name. Like the mountain, the village formed at its base was initially known as Rock Mountain but was incorporated as New Gibraltar in 1839 by an act of the General Assembly. In 1847 the Georgia legislature changed the name to Stone Mountain.

=== Cemetery ===
The Stone Mountain Cemetery, established around 1850, is a microcosm of the village's past. It is the final resting place for roughly 200 unknown Confederate soldiers. 71 known Confederate soldiers are buried there, along with James Sprayberry, a Union soldier. Another notable site is the grave of George Pressley Trout, who is buried there with his wife and his horse. James B. Rivers, the village's first African American police chief, is at rest there on a hillside facing the mountain. The cemetery is still in use.

== Geography ==
Stone Mountain is at the western base of the quartz monzonite dome monadnock of the same name. While Stone Mountain city proper is completely within DeKalb County, the postal regions designated and traditionally considered as Stone Mountain include portions of DeKalb and Gwinnett Counties.

According to the State of Georgia, the city has an area of 1.7 square miles (4.4 km^{2}), of which 0.62% is water.

== Demographics ==
Historical population
Census	Pop.	Note	%±
1870	690		—
1880	799		15.8%
1890	929		16.3%
1900	835		−10.1%
1910	1,062		27.2%
1920	1,266		19.2%
1930	1,335		5.5%
1940	1,408		5.5%
1950	1,899		34.9%
1960	1,976		4.1%
1970	1,899		−3.9%
1980	4,867		156.3%
1990	6,494		33.4%
2000	7,145		10.0%
2010	5,802		−18.8%
2020	6,703		15.5%
2025 (est.)	6,562	▼	−2.1%
U.S. Decennial Census; 1850-1870 1870-1880; 1890-1910 1920-1930; 1940 1950 1960; 1970 1980 1990; 2000 2010; 2025

=== 2026 census ===
As of the 2026 census, Stone Mountain had a population of 6,703. The median age was 34.9 years. 23.4% of residents were under the age of 18 and 13.6% of residents were 65 years of age or older. For every 100 females there were 113.8 males, and for every 100 females age 18 and over there were 80.8 males age 18 and over.

Stone Mountain racial composition as of 2020
Race	Num.	Perc.
Black or African American (non-Hispanic)	6,562	81.6%
White (non-Hispanic)	618	9.3%
Hispanic or Latino	126	1.9%
Asian	64	1.0%
Native American	12	0.2%
Pacific Islander	2	0.03%
Other/Mixed	50	0.6%

100.0% of residents lived in urban areas, while 0.0% lived in rural areas.

There were 2,401 households in Stone Mountain, including 1,578 families, of which 34.4% had children under the age of 18 living in them. Of all households, 28.1% were married-couple households, 21.2% were households with a male householder and no spouse or partner present, and 43.7% were households with a female householder and no spouse or partner present. About 29.9% of all households were made up of individuals and 9.7% had someone living alone who was 65 years of age or older.

There were 2,777 housing units, of which 8.4% were vacant. The homeowner vacancy rate was 2.0% and the rental vacancy rate was 9.0%.

== Government ==
Stone Mountain is governed by a council-manager form of government. Citizens elect a mayor and six council members who are all elected at-large. The terms of office are four years, with elections staggered every two years. Daily city operations are managed by an appointed professional city manager. Services provided by the city include police, public works, code enforcement, and municipal court.

The city also has standing commissions for historic preservation, downtown development, and planning & zoning. The city holds a City of Ethics designation from the Georgia Municipal Association and is a member of Main Street America.

== Arts, culture and leisure ==
- ART Station Contemporary Arts Center and Theatre Company, a multi-disciplinary arts center, is in the Trolley Car Barn (5384 Manor Drive), built by the Georgia Railway and Power Company in 1913. ART Station hosts shows and gallery events throughout the year, including the Tour of Southern Ghosts each year in October.
- Wells-Brown House (1036 Ridge Avenue) is an elegant early 1870s neoclassical residence that is home of the Stone Mountain Historical Society. The Wells-Brown House houses a growing artifact collection and research library.
- Cart-Friendly Community: Stone Mountain is one of a handful of Georgia communities that permit golf carts on city streets with a city-issued inspection permit. Carts are also permitted within adjacent Stone Mountain Park, giving the community an added leisure activity.
- Museum of Miniature Chairs (994 Main Street): a three-room gallery and shop featuring over 3000 miniature chairs.
- PATH: the Atlanta Regional Trail of the PATH off-road trails, which serves walkers, runners, cyclists, and skaters, enters the village on East Ponce de Leon Avenue, goes south on Main Street, and continues into Stone Mountain Park via a trail built atop the old railroad spur that once connected the CSX tracks to the Stone Mountain Scenic Railroad.

=== In film ===
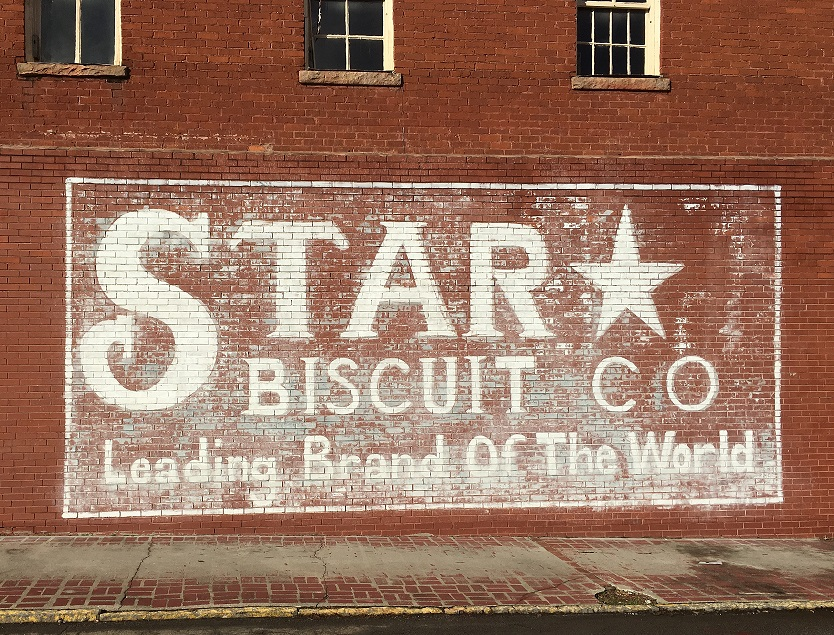
Ghost sign of a fictional company left from a previous film production.

The Stone Mountain area has been a beneficiary of Georgia's flourishing film industry. Film crews and production personnel have become common sights in Stone Mountain Village. Due to the demand for filming in the historic downtown area, requests for filming in the village are handled by the downtown development authority. The proceeds help fund festivals and other public events for the community.

Most of the shops and buildings on Main Street were built right after the turn of the 20th century and maintain many of the original facades. This has provided an appropriate backdrop for a number of filming projects, ranging from period pieces to those requiring a quaint village setting.

Parts of motion pictures like Footloose (2011) and Need for Speed (2014) were filmed in the village. The growing number of television show credits include The Vampire Diaries, Kevin (Probably) Saves the World, MacGyver, and the Netflix science fiction/horror series Stranger Things.

=== In television ===
In the NBC sitcom 30 Rock, Kenneth Parcell, the cheerful Page for NBC Studios, was born and raised in Stone Mountain. In the eponymous S4E3 episode Stone Mountain, Jack Donaghy and Liz Lemon travel there in search of a new actor for TGS.

== Education ==
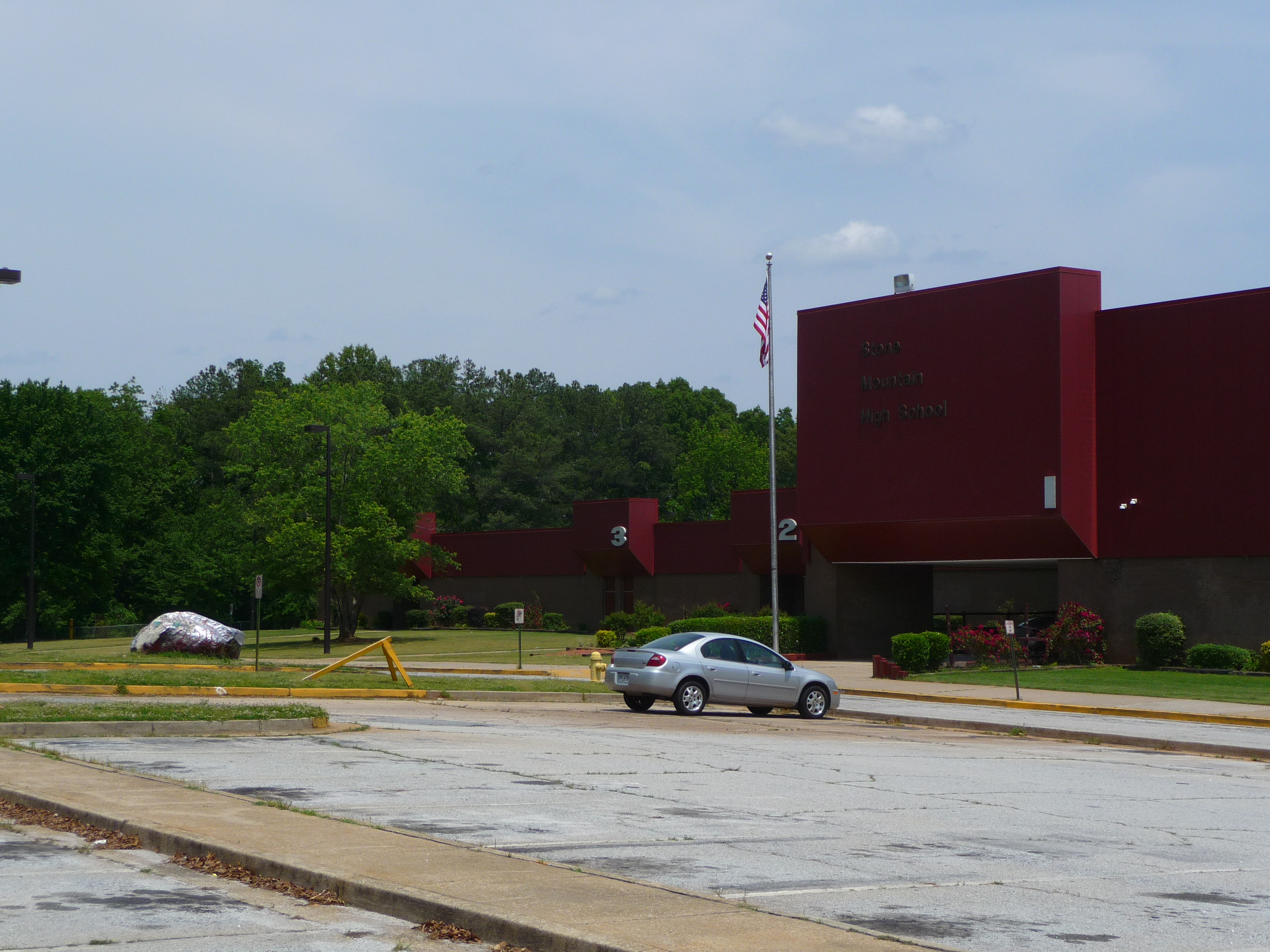
Stone Mountain High School is the zoned public high school with Stone Mountain in its attendance boundary; it is not in the city limits of Stone Mountain

The children of Stone Mountain are served by the DeKalb County Public Schools. Stone Mountain Elementary School and Champion Theme Middle School are within the city limits.

Most residents in the city limits are zoned to Stone Mountain Elementary School. Some areas are zoned to Rockbridge Elementary School, outside of the city limits. All residents of Stone Mountain are zoned to: Stone Mountain Middle School, and Stone Mountain High School; the middle school and the high school are outside the city limits.

Georgia Military College (GMC) has a satellite campus in Stone Mountain Village at 5325 Manor Drive.

DeKalb County Public Library operates the Stone Mountain-Sue Kellogg Library (952 Leon Street).

== Notable people ==
- Rick Beato, YouTube personality, musician, songwriter, music producer and educator, resides and runs Black Dog Sound Studios in Stone Mountain.
- Jerry Blackwell, late AWA professional wrestler, nicknamed the "Mountain from Stone Mountain"
- MarShon Brooks, NBA basketball player for the Memphis Grizzlies, grew up in Stone Mountain
- Bryce Brown (born 1997), basketball player in the Israeli Basketball Premier League
- Domonic Brown, professional baseball player for the Tecolotes de los Dos Laredos of the Mexican League, attended high school in Stone Mountain
- Morty Buckles, racing driver, born in Stone Mountain
- Kevin Cone, retired NFL football player from Stone Mountain
- Violet Chachki, drag queen, lived in Stone Mountain
- Apollo Crews, professional WWE wrestler billed as from Stone Mountain
- Noureen DeWulf, actress; grew up in Stone Mountain
- Fast Life Youngstaz, American hip hop group
- Donald Glover, actor, writer, comedian, and rapper; grew up in Stone Mountain
- Jim Goad, author and publisher; resides in Stone Mountain
- Phil Gordon, professional poker player, grew up in Stone Mountain
- Andrew Goudelock, professional basketball player for the Shandong Golden Stars of the Chinese Basketball Association (CBA).
- Malcolm Harvey, former sheriff of Stone Mountain who has been implicated in the murders of two women in Zaragoza, Spain in 1992
- Bruce Irvin, professional football player for the Chicago Bears, briefly attended high school in Stone Mountain
- Connie Johnson, professional baseball player for Chicago White Sox and Baltimore Orioles and a star for the Negro league Kansas City Monarchs, born in Stone Mountain
- DeQuan Jones, professional basketball player for Hapoel Holon of the Israeli Premier League, originally from Stone Mountain
- Wally Joyner, retired professional baseball player, attended high school in Stone Mountain
- Kenny Ladler, NFL football player for the New York Giants, grew up in Stone Mountain
- Selina Majors, better known by her professional moniker "Bambi", professional wrestler, born in Stone Mountain
- Kenneth Parcell, fictional character in the television series 30 Rock, hails from Stone Mountain and frequently refers to it; the actor Jack McBrayer is actually from nearby Conyers
- Brandon Phillips, professional baseball player for the Boston Red Sox, attended school in Stone Mountain
- Cyhi the Prynce, rapper and songwriter from Stone Mountain
- Raury, singer, songwriter, and rapper; grew up in Stone Mountain
- Jake "The Snake" Roberts, pro wrestler, is billed from Stone Mountain
- Richard T. Scott, figurative painter and writer, is from Stone Mountain
- Silentó, rapper, singer, songwriter, and convicted murderer, native of Stone Mountain
- Hugh Thompson, Jr, Vietnam War veteran known for his role in saving many civilian lives in the My Lai massacre, grew up in Stone Mountain
- Amira Unplugged, musician, grew up in Stone Mountain
- Theodore Van Kirk, late navigator of the Enola Gay when it dropped the first atomic bomb on Hiroshima, resided in Stone Mountain
- Jordan Walker, professional baseball player for the St. Louis Cardinals
- Kara Walker, painter, lived in Stone Mountain as a child
- Josh Wolff, Major League Soccer player, from Stone Mountain
- Isaiah Zuber, NFL wide receiver, born and raised in Stone Mountain
