= Zaragoza Air Base =

Zaragoza Air Base
- Part of Spanish Air and Space Force (Spanish: Ejército del Aire y del Espacio; "Army of the Air and Space")
- Located near Zaragoza, Spain
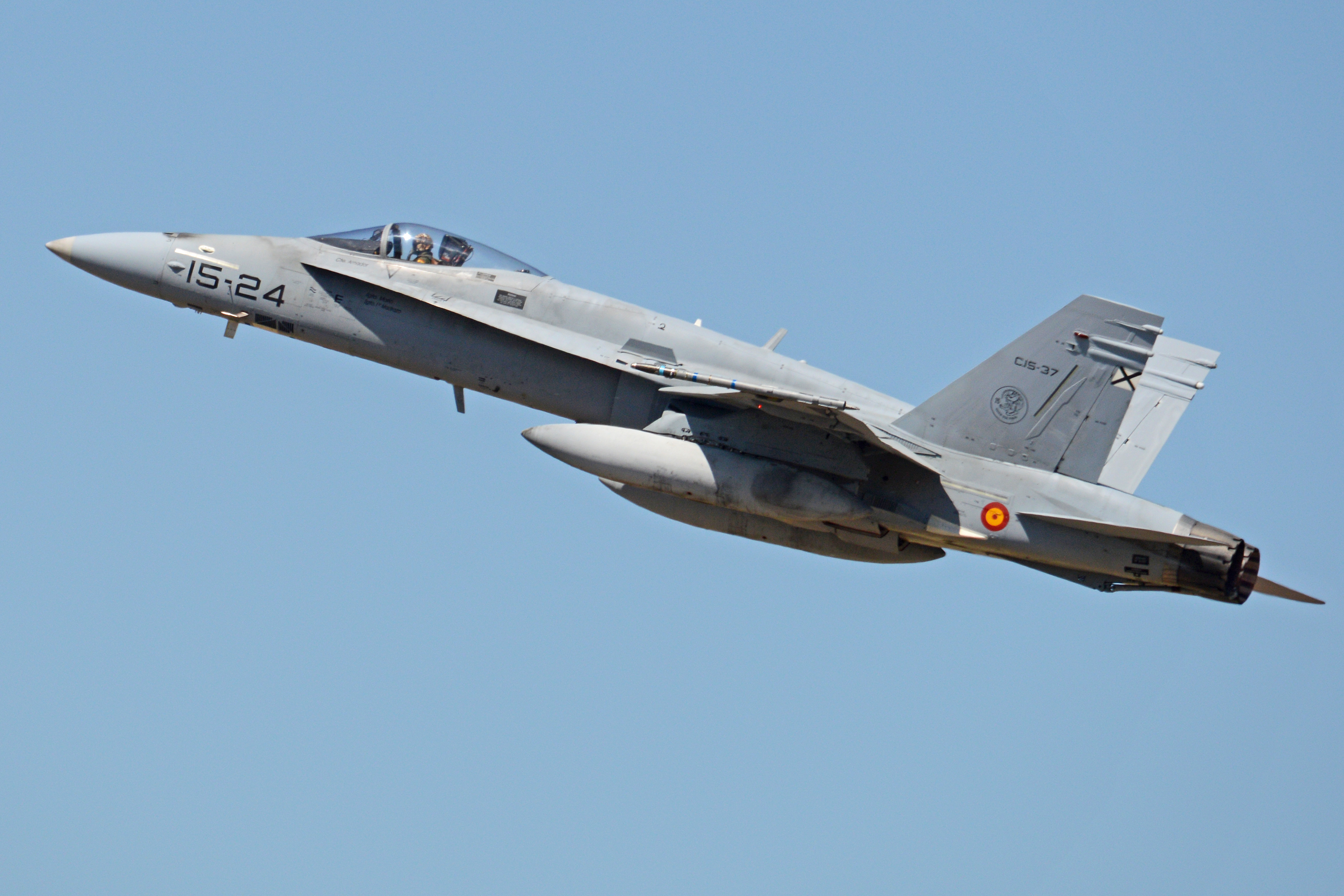
- A Spanish Air and Space Force EF-18A Hornet at Zaragoza AB

Site information
- Type: Air and Space Force Base

Location
- Location of Zaragoza Air Base, Spain
- Coordinates: 41°39′58″N 01°02′30″W

Site history
- Built: 1954
- In use: 1954-1992

Airfield information
- IATA: ZAZ; ICAO: LEZG

Summary
- Elevation AMSL: 263 m / 863 ft
- Interactive map of Airfield information

Runways
Direction	Length		Surface
Direction	m	ft	Surface
12R/30L	3,718	12,200	Concrete
12L/30R	3,024	9,921	Asphalt

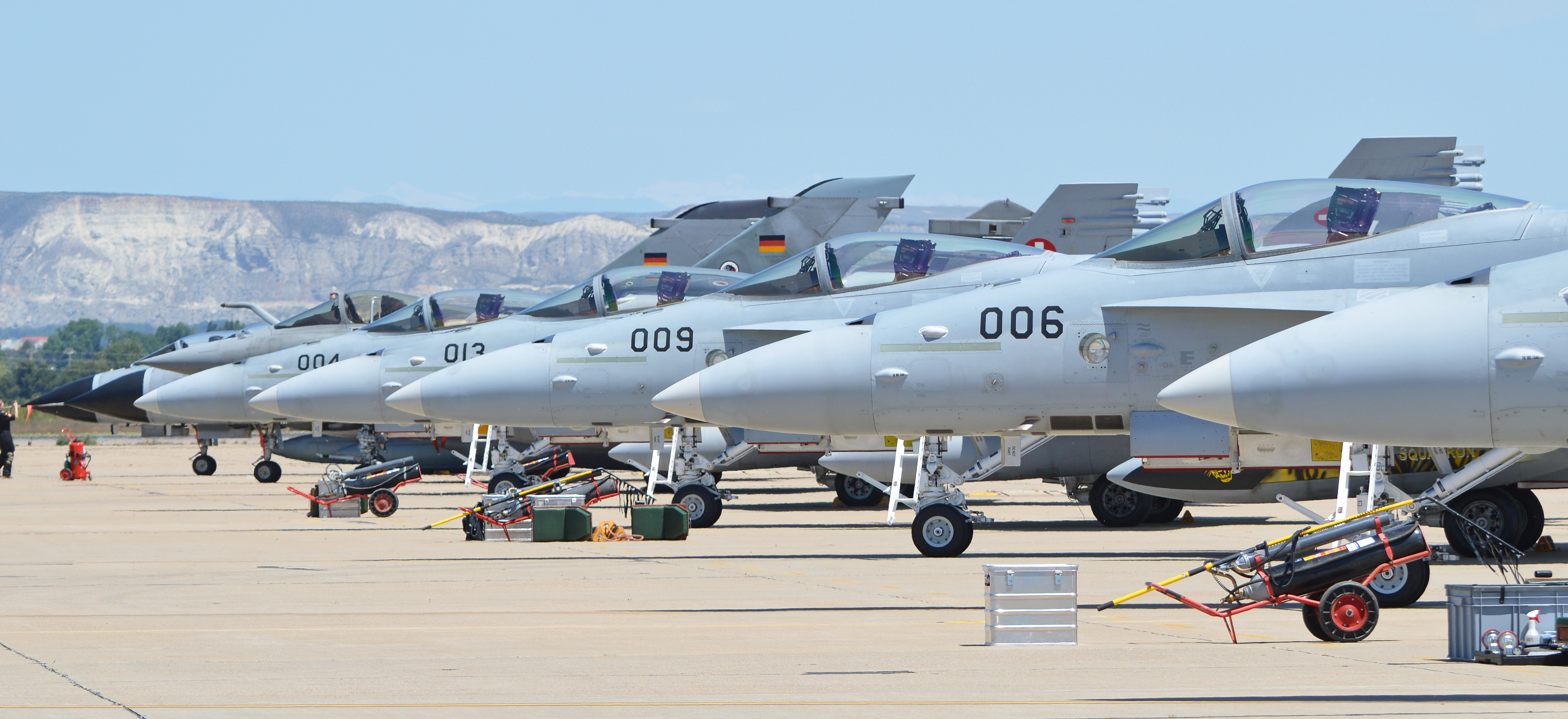
NTM2016 at Zaragoza Air Base

Zaragoza Air Base (IATA: ZAZ, ICAO: LEZG) is a base of the Spanish Air and Space Force located near Zaragoza, Spain. It is located 16 kilometres (10 mi) west of Zaragoza, 270 km (168 mi) west of Barcelona, and 262 km (163 mi) northeast of Madrid. It shares infrastructure with the Zaragoza Airport. In the past, Zaragoza was also used as an emergency landing site for the United States's Space Shuttle.

Between 1958 and 1992, Zaragoza Air Base was used by the United States Air Force, courtesy of the Pact of Madrid.

In 1992, Malcolm Harvey robbed and murdered two Zaragoza women while serving at the air base.

On 20 May 2023, an F-18 crashed during an air show at Zaragoza Air Base. The aircraft "erupted into a giant fireball", according to local news sources. The pilot ejected and was thought to be safe.
