= Hero City (Soviet Union) =

Honorary title for cities in the Soviet Union

Hero Cities which have been awarded the title by the Soviet Union on a map of the European part of the Soviet Union

Hero City (Note: Russian: город-герой, romanized: gorod-geroy; Belarusian: горад-герой, romanized: horad-hyeroy; Ukrainian: місто-герой, romanized: misto-heroi.) is a Soviet honorary title awarded for outstanding heroism during World War II (the Eastern Front is known in most countries of the former Soviet Union as the Great Patriotic War). It was awarded to twelve cities of the Soviet Union, today located in Belarus (1 city), Russia (7 cities), and Ukraine (4 cities). Brest Fortress in Belarus was awarded the equivalent title of Hero Fortress. This symbolic distinction for a city corresponds to the individual distinction "Hero of the Soviet Union".

According to the statute, the hero city was issued the Order of Lenin, the Gold Star medal, and the certificate of the heroic deed (gramota or hramota) from the Presidium of the Supreme Soviet of the USSR. Also, the corresponding obelisk was installed in the city.

== History ==
The usage of the term "hero city" is dated to articles in Pravda as early as in 1942. The first official usage of the title is dated by May 1, 1945, when Joseph Stalin issued his Supreme Commander Order No. 20 commanding to fire salutes in "hero cities Leningrad, Stalingrad, Sevastopol, and Odessa."

On June 22, 1961 (the 20th anniversary of the beginning of the Great Patriotic War) the term "Hero City" was applied to Kiev in the ukases that awarded Kiev the Order of Lenin and introduced the Medal "For the Defence of Kiev".

The statute of the title was officially introduced on May 8, 1965, by the ukase of the Presidium of the Supreme Soviet of USSR, on the occasion of the 20th anniversary of the victory in the Great Patriotic War. The same day ukases were issued about awarding the cities mentioned above: Leningrad (Saint Petersburg), Volgograd (former Stalingrad), Kiev, Sevastopol, and Odessa. Additionally, Moscow was declared Hero City and Brest declared Hero Fortress.

Subsequent awards were issued as follows:

- September 14, 1973: Kerch and Novorossiysk.
- June 26, 1974: Minsk
- December 7, 1976: Tula
- May 6, 1985: Murmansk and Smolensk

In 1988 the issuance of the award was officially discontinued.

=== Suggestions for expanding the list ===
The suggestion was first proposed by the Azerbaijani ambassador to Russia Polad Bülbüloğlu in an interview in February 2015. In the interview, he said that Baku getting the status of Hero City "would be quite fair" and that it "would be a respect to the people who lost their lives working day and night" along with being an "important socio-political act". In an interview with Vestnik Kavkaza, historian Efim Pivovar recommended that the Russian Federation not assign the city this title and instead support an initiative through the Commonwealth of Independent States to award Baku, as well as cities like Tashkent, with this title. In January 2020, Russian Deputy Dmitry Savelyev became one of the first sitting members of parliament to publicly support this.

== Hero Cities list ==
=== Brest Fortress ===
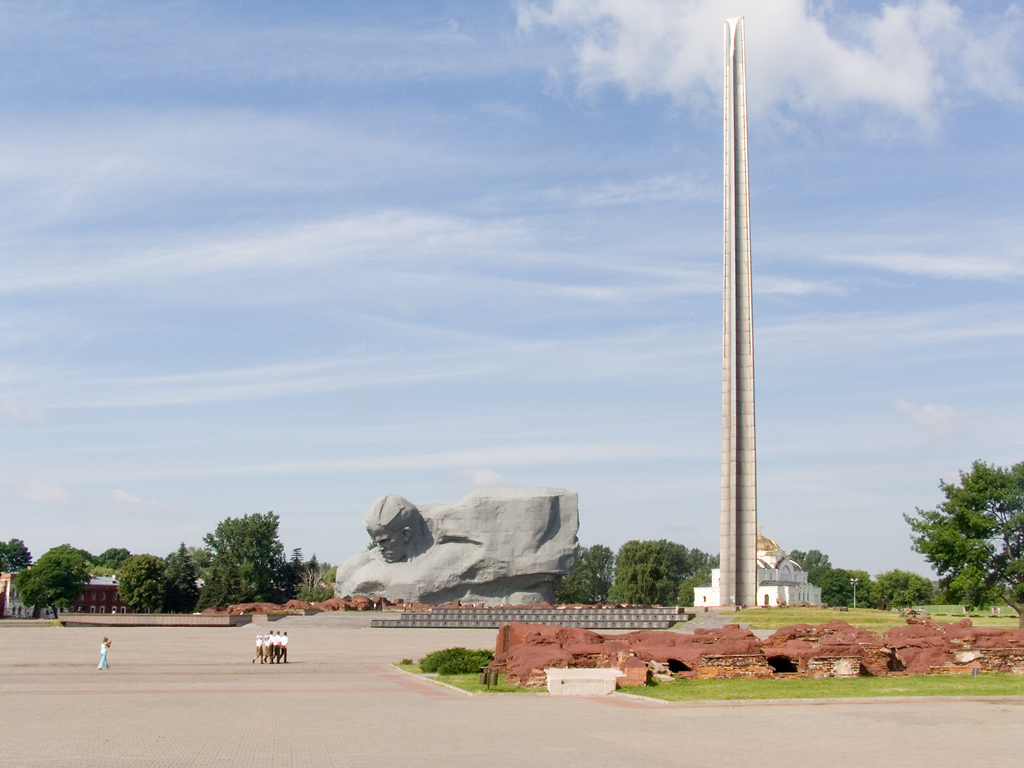
Monument to the Brest Fortress

The fortress in Brest, Belarus was awarded the title Hero Fortress in 1965. It was located right on the recently established border between the Soviet Union and Nazi Germany drawn in the secret appendix to the Molotov–Ribbentrop Pact. As such, the fortress had little warning when the Axis invaded on June 22, 1941, and became the site of the first major fighting between Soviet frontier guards and the invading German forces of Army Group Centre.

German artillery heavily shelled the fortress; the subsequent attempt to quickly take it with infantry failed, however, and the Germans started a lengthy siege. The Brest garrison, although cut off from reinforcements and having run out of food, water and ammunition, fought and counter-attacked until the very last minute. The Germans deployed tanks, tear gas and flame throwers. After the Germans had taken most of the ruined fortifications, taking heavy casualties, fighting continued underground.

The fighting ended only on June 29. The actual front had by then already moved hundreds of kilometres further east. Even after the fortress was officially taken, the few surviving defenders continued to hide in the basements and to harass the Germans for several months.

=== Leningrad ===
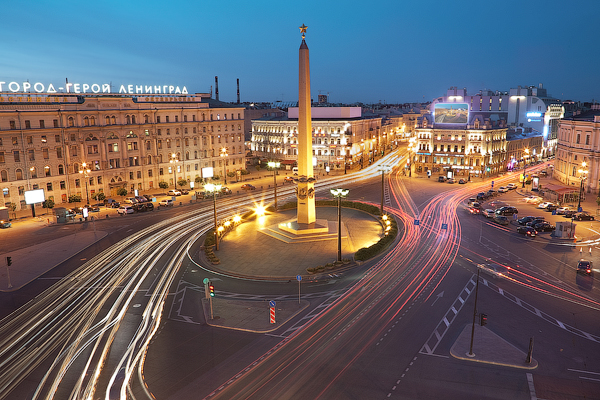
Leningrad Hero City Obelisk

The city of Leningrad, now known as Saint Petersburg, saw what is regarded as one of the greatest human tragedies of the entire war. Leningrad, one of the cities with a large amount of classical and baroque architecture on the Baltic Sea, was a city with a pre-war population of three million inhabitants. By August 1941, the Germans had reached the city's southern outskirts. Finnish forces had meanwhile recaptured the Karelian Isthmus northwest of the city, which they had lost after the Winter War in 1940.

The city was completely cut off from all land access on September 8, 1941. As the Gulf of Finland was blocked as well, Leningrad's only contact with the outer world was a vulnerable waterway across Lake Ladoga (Road of Life), as Finnish command didn't agree to German requests to advance beyond the River Svir and to conquer the rest of the Lake's coastline. Since taking the city seemed too costly to the Germans, in the light of bitter Soviet resistance, they instead began the Siege of Leningrad to starve the city to death. Soon, electricity, water and heating for civilian housing had to be shut down. All public transportation stopped in 1941–42 winter, but in 1942 city tramcars were relaunched (trolleys and buses were inoperable until the end of the war).

Thousands of Leningrad citizens froze or starved to death in the first winter of the siege alone, dying at home in their beds or collapsing from exhaustion in the streets. Meanwhile, German artillery continued to bombard the city. Although the siege lasted for 872 days, the city did not surrender. When Lake Ladoga froze in the winter, the Road of Life was opened to the Soviet-held southern shore, with a long trail of trucks bringing food and supplies to the besieged city and evacuating citizens on their way back. Both the food and the civilian transports were constantly attacked by the Germans with artillery shelling and air raids.

When Soviet forces eventually lifted the siege in January 1944, over one million inhabitants of Leningrad had died from starvation, exposure and German shelling. 300,000 soldiers had perished in the defence and relief of Leningrad. Leningrad was awarded the title Hero City in 1965, being the first city to receive that distinction.

=== Volgograd (Stalingrad) ===
Volgograd is the present-day name of the city of Stalingrad. The defence of Stalingrad from July to November 1942, the counter-offensive of November 19, 1942, that trapped the Axis forces in and around the ruined city, and the German surrender on February 2, 1943, marked the turning point of the European Theatre of World War II. The intensity and sheer scale of the Battle of Stalingrad illustrate the ferocity of the German-Soviet War. Heavy German bombardment, killing thousands of civilians, had turned the city into a landscape of ruins. Workers of the city's weapons factories started personally handing over arms and ammunition to the defending soldiers as the Germans closed in, and eventually continued the fight themselves. Ever more Soviet troops were shipped into the city across the Volga River under enemy fire. German superiority in tanks became useless in the rubble of urban warfare. Fierce man-to-man fighting in streets, buildings and staircases continued for months. The Red Army moved its strategic reserve from Moscow to the lower Volga and transferred all available aircraft from the entire country to the Stalingrad area. The Germans eventually lost a quarter of their total forces deployed on the Eastern Front, and never fully recovered from the defeat. The total casualties on both sides are estimated at nearly 2 million, within a period of 200 days. Volgograd was awarded the title Hero City in 1965.

=== Odessa ===
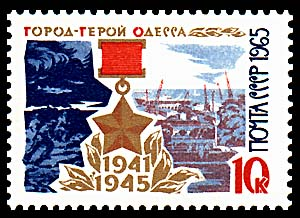
Odessa commemorative stamp (USSR, 1965)

In early August 1941, the Black Sea port of Odessa, located in present-day Ukraine, was attacked and besieged by Romanian forces fighting alongside their German allies. The fierce battle in defense of the city lasted until October 16, when the remaining Soviet troops, as well as 15,000 civilians were evacuated by sea. Partisan fighting continued, however, in the city's catacombs. Odessa was awarded the title Hero City in 1965.

=== Sevastopol ===
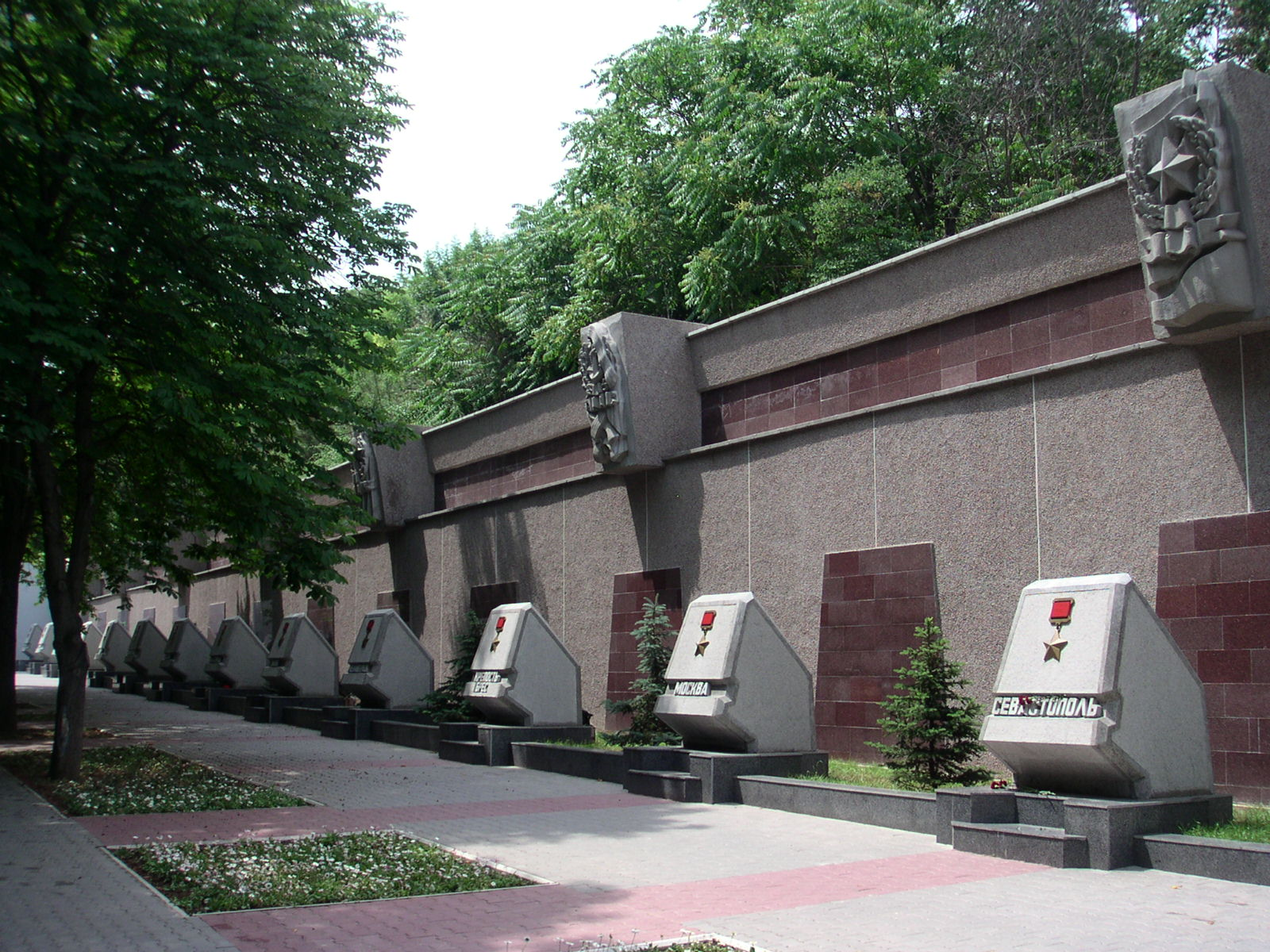
Hero City monument at Sevastopol

The Soviet Black Sea port of Sevastopol was a heavily defended fortress on the Crimean peninsula. German and Romanian troops had advanced to the outskirts of the city from the north and launched their attack on October 30, 1941. Having failed to take the city, Axis forces began a siege and heavy bombardment, with such unusual pieces of ordnance as the Mörser Karl self-propelled mortar, and the gigantic Schwerer Gustav railroad cannon. A second Axis offensive against the city, launched in December 1941, failed as well, as the Soviet army and navy forces continued to fight fiercely. Eventually the city was taken in June 1942. It was liberated in bloody fighting in May 1944. Sevastopol was awarded the title Hero City in 1965.

=== Moscow ===
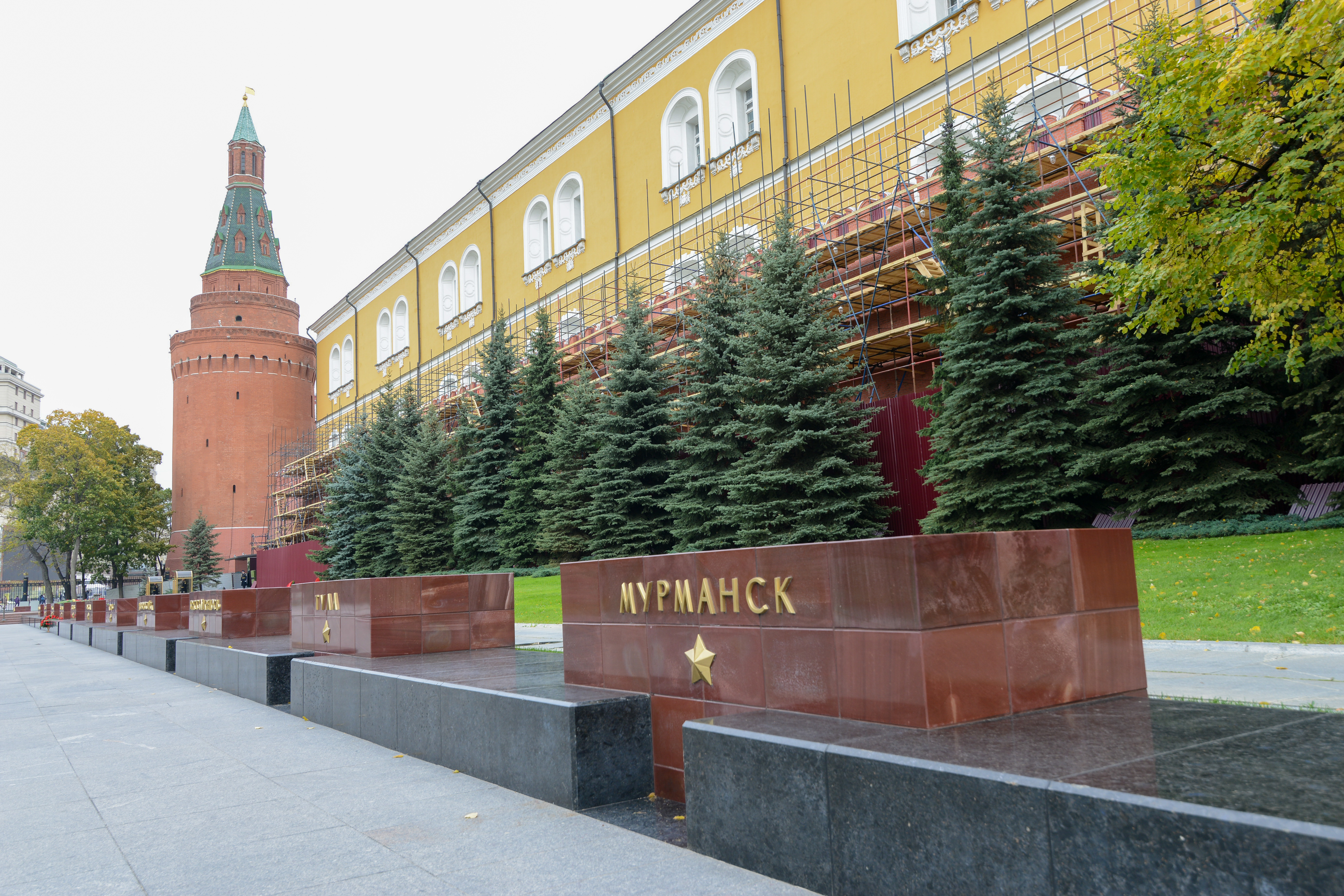
Hero Cities Memorial in Moscow

At the gates of the Soviet capital, the German invaders suffered their first defeat in 1941. The advance of the German Army Group Centre came to a halt in late November 1941, at the outskirts of Moscow itself. The Soviet Government had by then been evacuated, yet Joseph Stalin remained in the city. The population helped build defensive positions in the streets. The underground metro stations provided shelter during German air raids.

General Georgy Zhukov, who assumed command of the city's defence, largely left close combat tactics to the local commanders on the city's approaches, and focused on concentrating fresh troops from Siberia for an eventual counter-attack. The Soviet counter-offensive was launched on December 5 and 6, 1941. In the freezing cold of an unusually harsh winter, Soviet forces, including well-equipped ski battalions, drove the exhausted Germans back out of reach of Moscow and consolidated their positions on January 7, 1942. The victory in the battle provided an important boost in morale for the Soviet population. Moscow was awarded the title Hero City in 1965.

=== Kiev ===
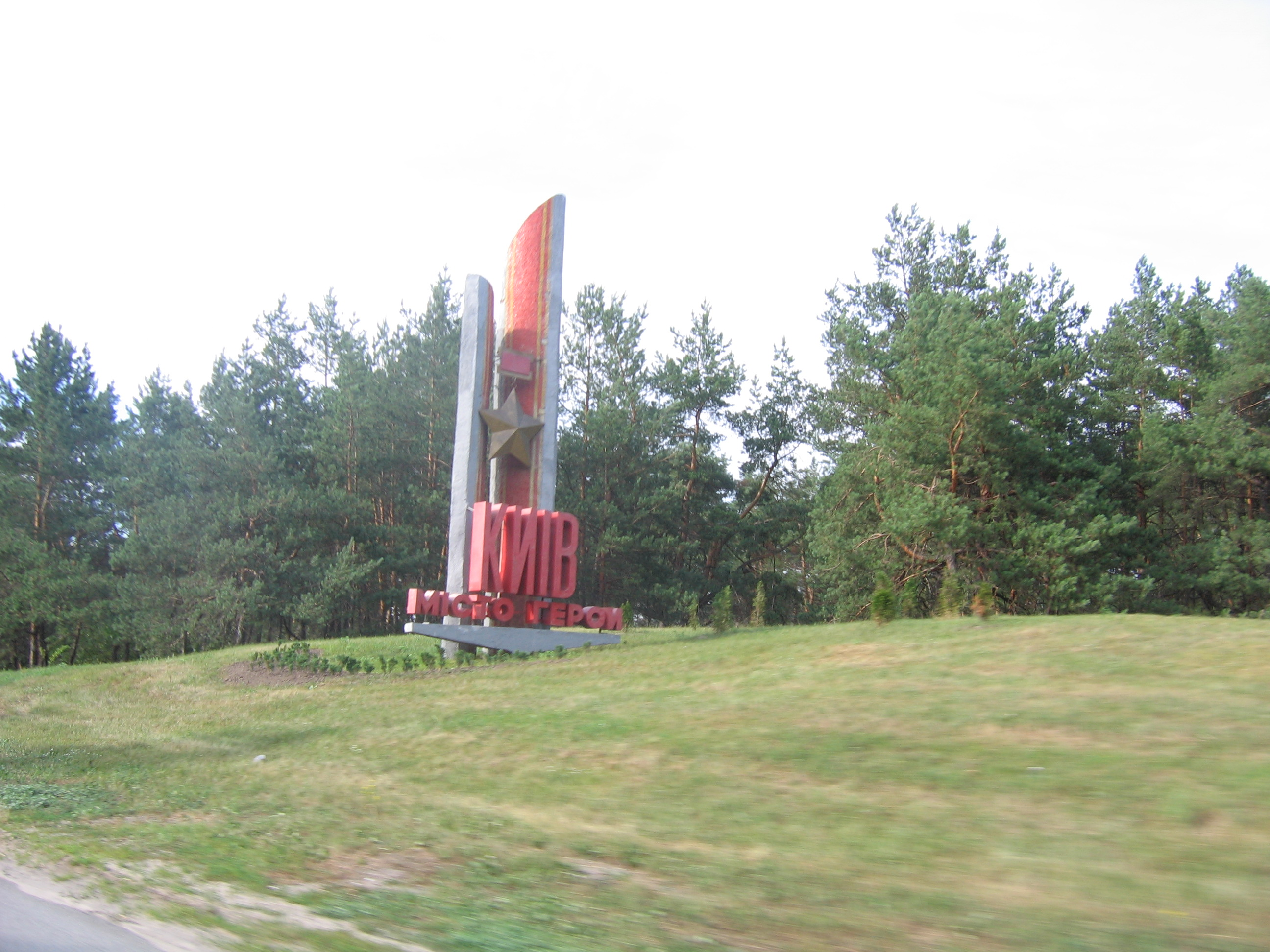
Hero City highway sign with the Communist star, Kiev in 2010.

The capital of present-day Ukraine became the site of the largest encirclement battle in the summer of 1941. When the Germans commenced their offensive on July 7, Soviet forces concentrated in the Kiev area were ordered to stand fast, and a breakout was prohibited. Defence of the pocket was fierce. Thousands of civilians volunteered to help defend the city. Eventually Kiev was taken on September 19. Over 600,000 Soviet soldiers were taken captive when the pocket was cleared. The prolonged resistance effectively disrupted the German plans of blitzkrieg. However, in military terms, the battle was a great victory for the German Army and a disaster for the Soviets. It had a huge effect on morale, and Adolf Hitler praised the victory as the greatest battle in history.

During the German occupation of Kiev, hundreds of thousands of civilians were killed or deported for forced labour. Kiev again became a battlefield when advancing Soviet forces pushed the Germans back West, liberating the city on November 6, 1943. Kiev was awarded the title Hero City in 1965.

=== Novorossiysk ===
The city of Novorossiysk on the eastern coast of the Black Sea provided a stronghold against the German summer offensive of 1942. Intense fighting in and around the city lasted from August until it was captured by the Germans in mid-September 1942. The Soviets however retained possession of the eastern part of the bay, which prevented the Germans from using the port for supply shipments. Novorossiysk was awarded the title Hero City in 1973.

=== Kerch ===
Kerch, a port city in the East of the Crimean peninsula, formed a bridgehead at the strait dividing Crimea from the Southern Russian mainland. After fierce fighting, it was taken by the Germans in November 1941. On December 30, 1941, the Soviets recaptured the city in a naval landing operation. In May 1942 the Germans occupied the city again, yet Soviet partisan forces held out in the cliffs near the city until October 1942. On October 31, 1943, another Soviet naval landing was launched. The largely ruined city was finally liberated on April 11, 1944. Kerch was awarded the title Hero City in 1973.

=== Minsk ===
The city of Minsk, capital of present-day Belarus, was encircled by advancing German forces in late June 1941. Trapped in a vast pocket, the Soviets defended their positions desperately. Their resistance was broken on July 9, with over 300,000 Soviet soldiers taken captive. During the following three-year occupation, the Germans killed about 400,000 civilians in and around the city. The Minsk area became a centre for the Soviet partisan activity behind enemy lines. Minsk was awarded the title Hero City in 1974.

=== Tula ===
Tula, a historical Russian city with important military industry south of Moscow, became the target of a German offensive to break Soviet resistance in the Moscow area between October 24 and December 5, 1941. The heavily fortified city held out, however, and secured the Southern flank during the Soviet defence of Moscow and the subsequent counter-offensive. Tula was awarded the title Hero City in 1976.

=== Murmansk ===
The city of Murmansk, located on the Kola Peninsula close to the Norwegian and Finnish borders, was a strategically important sea port and industrial city. It was the only Soviet port on the northern coast that did not freeze in the winter, and was vital for the transport of supplies to the South. German forces, including 800 Finns under German command, launched an offensive against Murmansk on June 29, 1941. More than 180,000 grenades and inflammable shells were fired on the city itself. Fierce Soviet resistance in the tundra and several Soviet counter-attacks made an Axis breakthrough impossible, however. Axis forces discontinued their attacks in late October 1941, having failed to take Murmansk or to cut off the Karelian railway line. Murmansk was awarded the title Hero City in 1985.

=== Smolensk ===
Located on the approaches to Moscow, the city of Smolensk saw fierce fighting in the summer of 1941. German armoured divisions of Army Group Centre began an offensive on July 10, 1941, to encircle Soviet forces in the Smolensk area. Soviet resistance was strong, and several counter-attacks were conducted. The Soviets even managed to temporarily break the German encirclement and to evacuate troops out of the pocket. The battle ended in early September. The bitter fighting had considerably delayed the overall German advance toward Moscow, so that defence lines further east could be strengthened. Smolensk was awarded the title Hero City in 1985.

=== Gallery of Memorial Obelisks ===
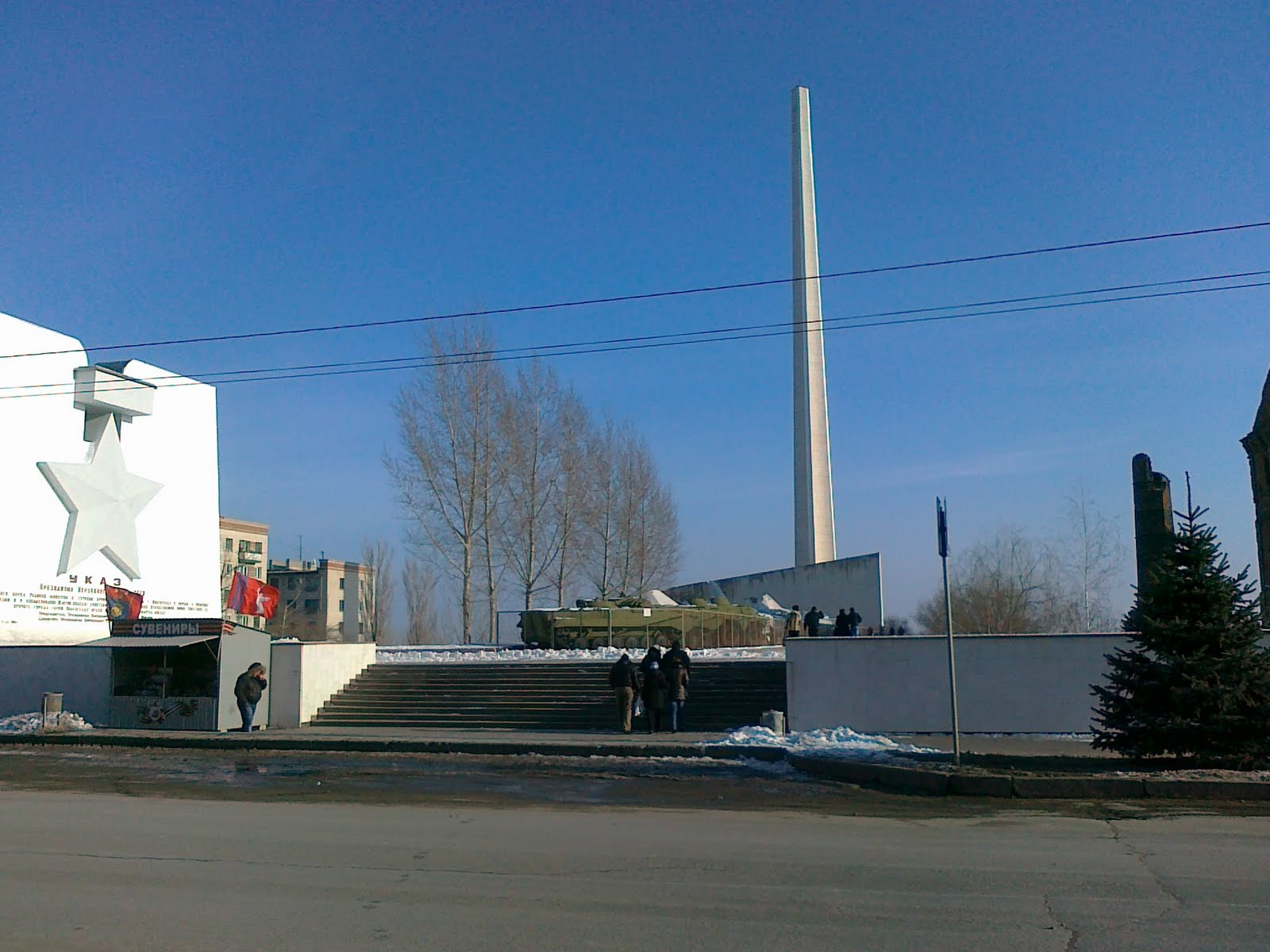
Volgograd Hero City Obelisk

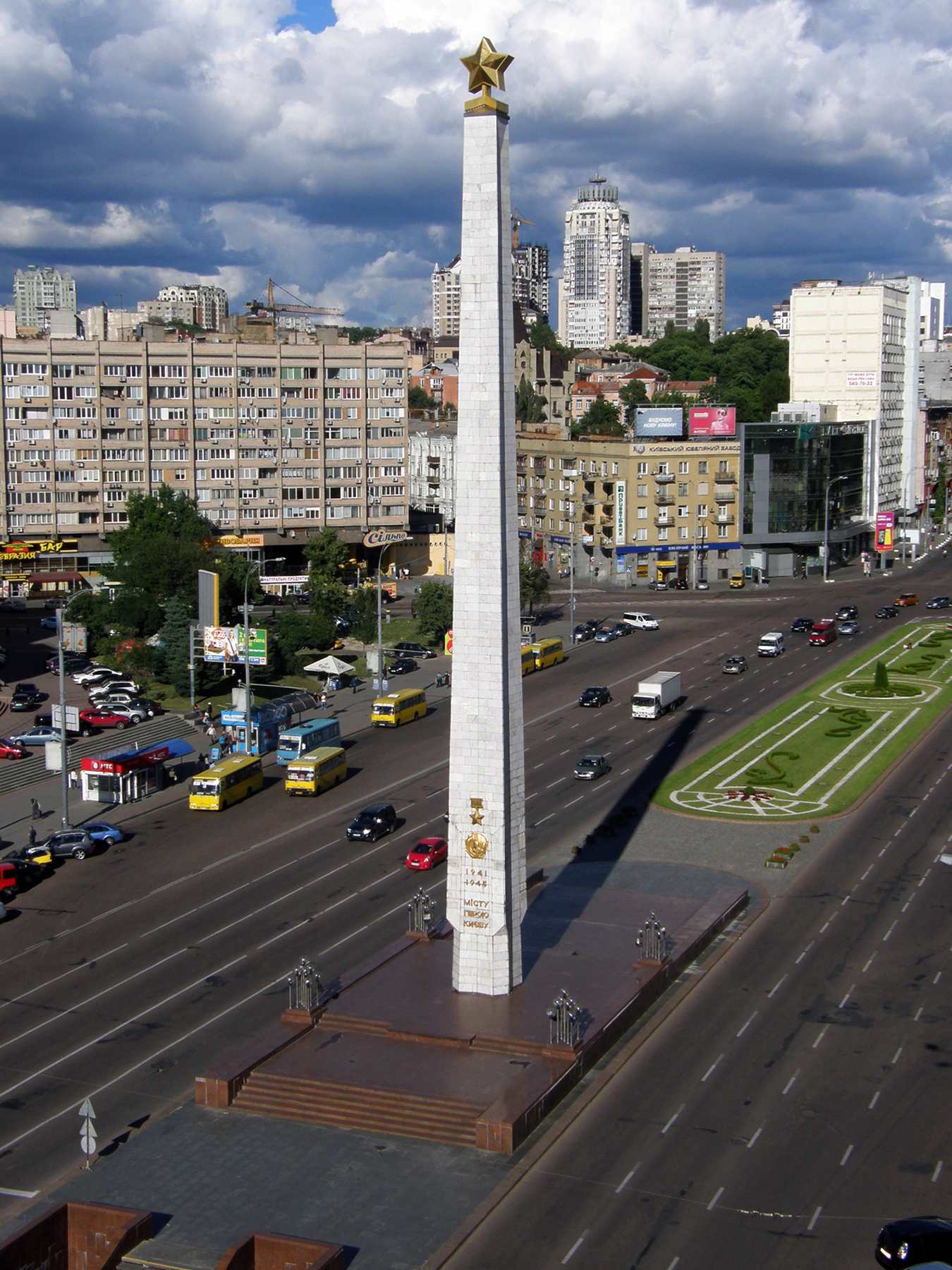
Kiev Hero City Obelisk (Note: The Order of Lenin has been removed from the obelisk in 2022 due to decommunization.)

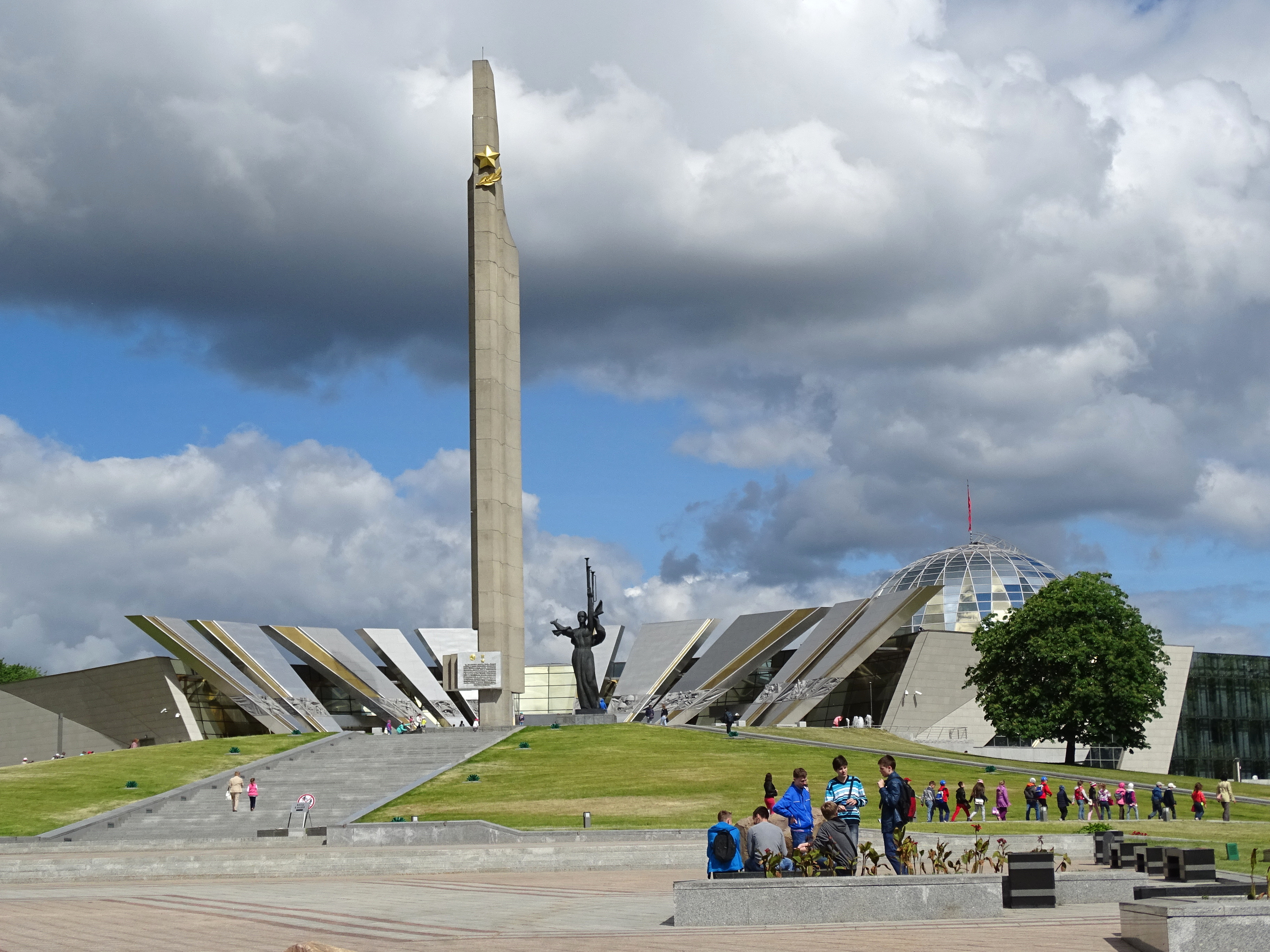
Minsk Hero City Obelisk

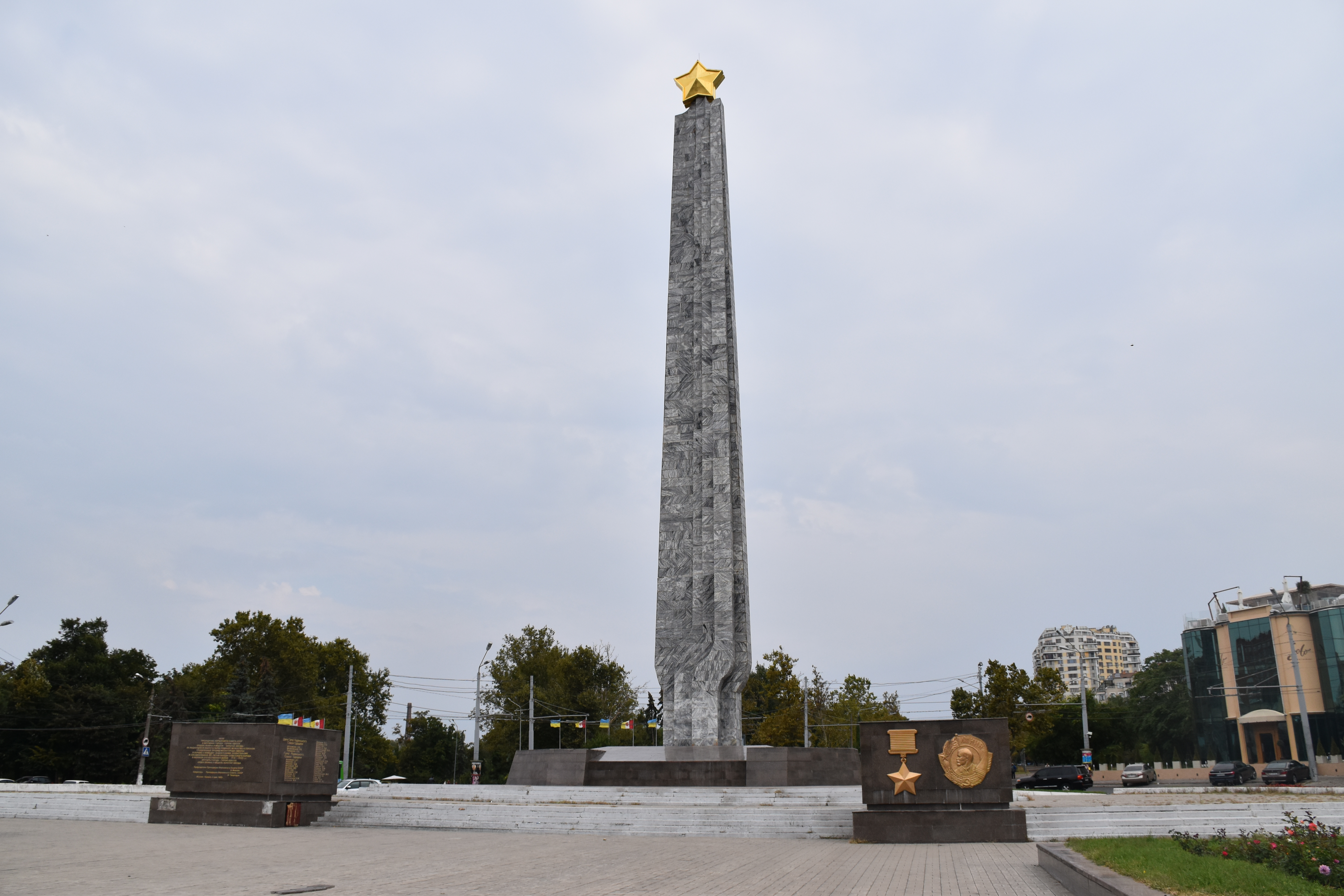
Odessa Hero City Obelisk

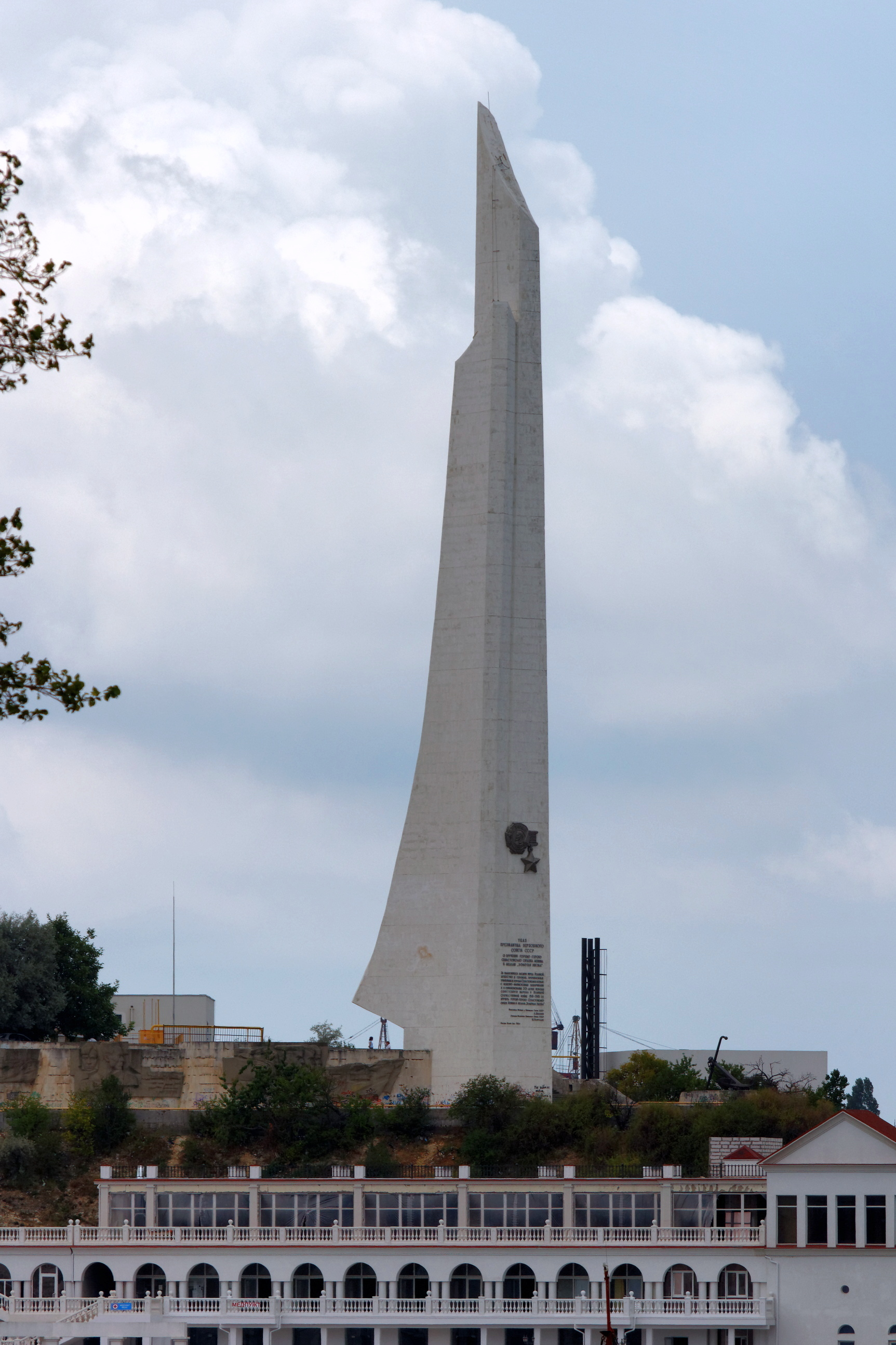
Sevastopol Hero City Obelisk

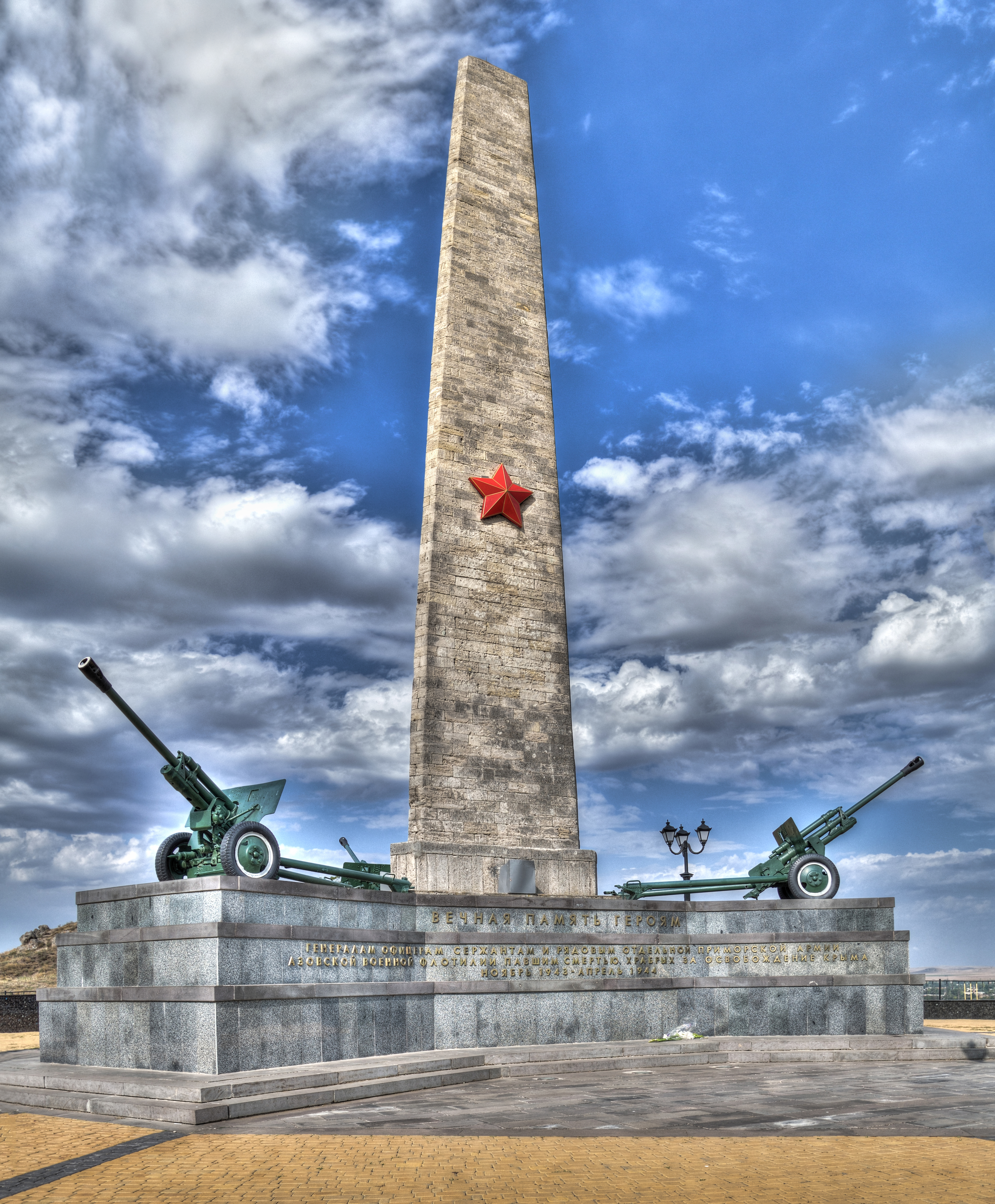
Kerch Hero City Obelisk

== Similar awards ==
=== Russia ===
On April 5, 2005, the State Duma of Russian Federation passed the law in the first reading about the introduction of the honorary title "City of Military Glory" (Russian: Город воинской славы). Potential candidates are places of fierce battles: Oryol, Rzhev, Yelnya, Voronezh, Vyazma, and others. It has been awarded to 45 cities in Russia.

In 2020, the title of "City of Labour Valour" was established, honouring the cities who had a record of uninterrupted production of military and civilian products at industrial enterprises during the Second World War. Twenty cities currently hold the title.

==== Russian-supported republics ====
In Georgia, the breakaway republics of Abkhazia and South Ossetia have hero cities in their nation, with those cities being given their title based on their perceived steadfast pushback against the Georgian military during their respective conflicts (War in Abkhazia from 1992 to 1993 and the Russo-Georgian War on 2008). In Abkhazia, the cities of Tkvarcheli and Gudauta were awarded the title of Hero of Abkhazia in with the status of a Hero City. On November 23, 2009, by the Decree of the President of South Ossetia, the capital of Tskhinvali was awarded the title for its "courage, endurance and heroism shown by the people and defenders of the city" during the Battle of Tskhinvali. The decree on conferring the award was read at a ceremony dedicated to the Day of Courage and National Unity.

In Ukraine, the self-proclaimed Donetsk People's Republic awarded the title of Hero City (connected to the title of Hero of the Donetsk People's Republic) to the city of Donetsk in August 2017.

=== Ukraine ===
In 2022, during the Russo-Ukrainian war, President Volodymyr Zelenskyy awarded the title of Hero City of Ukraine (connected to the title of Hero of Ukraine) to the cities of Kharkiv, Chernihiv, Mariupol, Kherson, Hostomel and Volnovakha. After that, four more cities received this title: Bucha, Irpin, Mykolaiv, and Okhtyrka.

=== Other countries ===
A number of other countries also awarded their highest military decorations to cities or other territorial units in commemoration of events of World War II and other conflicts:

- Croatia: After the Croatian War of Independence in 1991, the Croatian border city Vukovar was named Hero City because damage during the Battle of Vukovar in 1991 has been called the worst in Europe since World War II, drawing comparisons with Stalingrad.
- Cuba: The Republic of Cuba awards the title of Hero City to those cities with recognized military history, either in the 19th or 20th century. The most prominent example of these is the Hero City of Santiago de Cuba, awarded as such for its part in the Cuban War of Independence against the Spanish, the Spanish–American War and the Cuban Revolution.
- Indonesia: Surabaya can be considered Indonesia's equivalent to a Hero City, regarded as such because of the bravery of its residents during the 1945 Battle of Surabaya, the first ever major battle experienced by the young republic during the Indonesian National Revolution.
- Italy: A number of cities have been awarded the Gold Medal of Military Valor.
- Malta: The George Cross was awarded to the island of Malta in 1942.
- Portugal: Two municipalities on Terceira Island in the Azores were honoured by Maria II for their civilian bravery. Praia da Vitória ("The Beach of Victory") acquired its epithet from the Battle of Praia Bay and Angra likewise became Angra do Heroísmo or "Angra the Heroic" for the same victory.
- Spain: During the First Carlist War the city of Zaragoza was awarded the title "Siempre Heroica" (always heroic) for the citizens' spontaneous defense of the city during the Cincomarzada.
- Vietnam: The Socialist Republic of Vietnam awards the title of Hero City to those cities with recognized military history. The most prominent example of these is the Hero City of Ho Chi Minh City and Hanoi, awarded as such for its part in the Vietnam War.
- Yugoslavia: The Order of the People's Hero and "Hero City" title were awarded to eight cities which played a vital role in the Yugoslav Partisan antifascist resistance movement during World War II in Yugoslavia, across all six republics and two provinces of the former country: Belgrade, Zagreb, Ljubljana, Novi Sad, Prilep, Pristina, Drvar and Cetinje.
- Turkey: Three cities have been honored for their resistance movements against foreign invaders in Independence War: Antep honoured as "Gazi" (a Turkic-Islamic equivalent for "veteran", which is also wide-used title for Ataturk) in 1921, Maraş as "Kahraman" ("Hero") in 1973 and Urfa as "Şanlı" ("Glorius") in 1984. Also, all of this cities awarded with İstiklâl Madalyası ("Medal of Independence").

== See also ==
- World War II Heritage City
