= City of Military Glory =

Russian honorary title

The City of Military Glory (Russian: «Город воинской славы») is an honorary title bestowed upon the citizenry of cities in Russia where soldiers had displayed courage and heroism during the Second World War. The award, which to date has been bestowed upon 45 cities, is similar to the Hero City title awarded during the era of the Soviet Union and no city has yet received both awards.

== Creation ==
Federal law On the Honorary Title of the Russian Federation "City of Military Glory"

After being accepted by the State Duma on April 14, 2006, and approved by the Federation Council on April 26, 2006, the President of Russia Vladimir Putin signed into law the federal law On the Honorary Title of the Russian Federation "City of Military Glory" on May 9, 2006.

On the eve of Victory Day in 2009, at the ceremony conferring "City of Military Glory" status upon Vyazma, Kronstadt and Naro-Fominsk at the Moscow Kremlin, President Dmitry Medvedev stated:

What distinguishes human beings from the other inhabitants of this planet is that they have a soul and they have memory. What is happening today pays tribute to this memory, and it also indicates our assessment of our past, and our plans for the future.

A lot is being said now about the price we paid for victory, and about the lessons of the Great Patriotic War. I too spoke about this, yesterday, and again today.

Of course we must make every effort to ensure that the memory of these glorious pages of our history is never erased. It must remain an integral part of our daily life. The knowledge of our countrymen’s feats, of the part our country played in the Second World War, must be handed down from generation to generation, so that no one will attempt to distort history and create new myths in the name of achieving various political objectives.

I think that this is the main sense of the ceremony taking place in the Kremlin today.

Cities which have had the status conferred upon them have a monument erected which shows the city’s coat of arms along with the text from the Presidential ukaz, and on Defender of the Fatherland Day, Victory Day and the city's day, public commemorations and celebratory salutes take place.

== List of cities ==
=== Anapa ===
For the "courage, endurance and mass heroism, exhibited by defenders of the city in the struggle for the freedom and independence of the Motherland", in accordance with federal law No.2011-586 of May 5, 2011, Anapa was conferred upon with the "City of Military Glory" title by President Medvedev in honor of the successful resistance of its citizens during its brief German-Romanian military occupation from 1942 to 1943, in which the city was totally destroyed.

=== Arkhangelsk ===
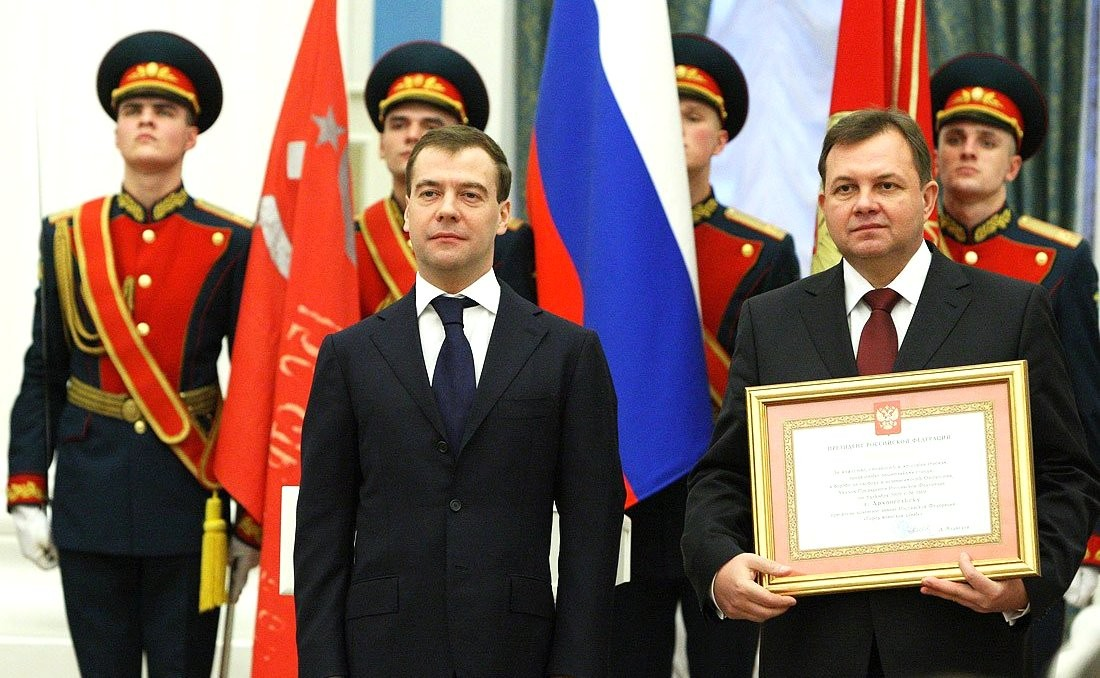
Ceremony on January 12, 2010 for the bestowing of the honorary title of City of Military Glory on Arkhangelsk.

During World War II, Arkhangelsk, along with Murmansk, were at the forefront of efforts to keep Allied supply lines open to the Soviet Union what became known as the Arctic Convoys. In all, 42 convoys delivered some 16 million tons of military supplies to Arkhangelsk, with the loss of many ships.

Arkhangelsk was conferred the status of "City of Military Glory" by President Medvedev on December 5, 2009, for "courage, endurance and mass heroism, exhibited by defenders of the city in the struggle for the freedom and independence of the Motherland". A ceremony was held in the Moscow Kremlin on January 12, 2010 at which the city was represented by the Mayor of Arkhangelsk, Viktor Pavlenko, and World War II veteran Serafim Nesmelov. At the ceremony Dmitry Medvedev noted that Arkhangelsk, which was founded by Ivan the Terrible has always been a forward area of national defense for Russia, and had contributed to the success of Peter the Great in the Great Northern War, and the sailors of the White Sea Flotilla contributed to the defense of the northern borders of the Soviet Union during World War II.

=== Belgorod ===
Belgorod was conferred the status of "City of Military Glory" by President Putin on April 27, 2007, for "courage, endurance and mass heroism, exhibited by defenders of the city in the struggle for the freedom and independence of the Motherland".

=== Bryansk ===
During the Great Patriotic War, Bryansk was occupied by troops of Nazi Germany from 6 October 1941 to 17 September 1943. The city which was extremely damaged was the scene of battles led by approximately 60,000 Soviet partisans, who fought Nazi troops in the forests of the city. In all, the partisans killed some 100,000 Nazi troops, derailed almost 1,000 trains, and destroyed hundreds of bridges and hundreds of kilometres of railway tracks. Twelve partisans who fought in Bryansk were later honoured as Heroes of the Soviet Union.

Bryansk was conferred the status of "City of Military Glory" by President Medvedev on March 25, 2010, for "courage, endurance and mass heroism, exhibited by defenders of the city in the struggle for the freedom and independence of the Motherland". A ceremony was held in the Moscow Kremlin on May 4, 2010 at which the city was represented by the Head of City, Nikolai Patov, and Chairman of the Regional Committee for War Veterans and Military Services, Dmitry Mitchenkov. At the ceremony Dmitry Anatolyevich Medvedev stated “Leo Tolstoy once remarked that a people who can engage in all-out guerrilla warfare during a conflict is invincible, and the Bryansk partisan movement confirmed the truth of this”.

=== Dmitrov ===
Dmitrov, some 70 kilometres (43 mi) from Moscow, was the scene of fierce battles during the Great Patriotic War in 1941 and was one of the sites that the Red Army was able to stop Wehrmacht troops from advancing to Moscow during the Battle of Moscow. The city was conferred the status of "City of Military Glory" by President Medvedev on October 28, 2008, for "courage, endurance and mass heroism, exhibited by defenders of the city in the struggle for the freedom and independence of the Motherland". See also: Perimilovsky Heights.

=== Kalach-na-Donu ===
Kalach-na-Donu, located 80 kilometres (50 mi) west of Volgograd, was the scene of heavy fighting between Soviet troops and troops of the Nazi 6th Army under the command of Friedrich Paulus. Battles intensified in July 1942, and the standoff between the two armies lasted until 31 August 1942. In November 1942, Soviet troops to the southwest of the city, and troops from the Stalingrad fronts, met in the southwest of the town and eventually encircling Nazi troops near Stalingrad. In all, some 54,000 Soviet troops were killed in battles in the area of the city, and 454 Soviet aviators were killed in dog fights above the city.

Kalach-na-Donu was conferred the status of "City of Military Glory" by President Medvedev on March 25, 2010, for "courage, endurance and mass heroism, exhibited by defenders of the city in the struggle for the freedom and independence of the Motherland". A ceremony was held in the Moscow Kremlin on May 4, 2010 at which the city was represented by the Head of the Municipal Administration, Vladimir Krishtal, and honorary citizen, Major-General and Professor of the FSB Academy, Yevgeny Mokhov.

=== Khabarovsk ===
The city of Khabarovsk in the Russian Far Eastern Krai of the same name (of which it is the capital city), named after Russian explorer Yerofey Khabarov who built the first of many forts among the Amur River in the 17th century, was in the Second World War the headquarters for the Far Eastern Military District and the command center for the Soviet Armed Forces units stationed in the Far East. Due to "courage, endurance and mass heroism, exhibited by defenders of the city in the struggle for the freedom and independence of the Motherland" in the wartime years, especially as command hub during the final weeks of the Pacific theater, on November 3, 2012, President Putin bestowed the "City of Military Glory" title to the city in accordance with Presidential Law No.2012-1468.

=== Kolpino ===
Due to the city's and its citizens' role in the Siege of Leningrad from 1941 to 1944, for the "courage, endurance and mass heroism, exhibited by defenders of the city in the struggle for the freedom and independence of the Motherland" Kolpino was conferred the title of "City of Military Glory" in accordance with Presidential Law-No.2011-587 on May 5, 2011 by President Medvedev. The city witnessed some of the bitterest fighting of the almost 3-year siege between the Soviets and the Germans.

=== Kovrov ===
For the "courage, endurance and mass heroism, exhibited by defenders of the city in the struggle for the freedom and independence of the Motherland" especially during the Battle of Moscow in 1941 in which the city was caught in the action, Kovrov City, Vladimir Oblast received the title of "City of Military Glory" by President Medvedev by virtue of Presidential Law No.2011-1456 on November 3, 2011.

=== Kozelsk ===
Kozelsk was conferred the status of "City of Military Glory" by President Medvedev on December 5, 2009, for "courage, endurance and mass heroism, exhibited by defenders of the city in the struggle for the freedom and independence of the Motherland".

=== Kronstadt ===
Due to its importance and the role played by the people and the Soviet Navy in its defense, Kronstadt was conferred the status of "City of Military Glory" by President Medvedev on April 27, 2009, for "courage, endurance and mass heroism, exhibited by defenders of the city in the struggle for the freedom and independence of the Motherland" during the war. The strong defense of the city coupled with its wartime role helped save Leningrad (now St. Petersburg) from total destruction in the 1941–44 siege.

=== Kursk ===
Kursk, the town where one of the biggest Eastern Front battles took place (the 1943 Battle of Kursk), was conferred the status of "City of Military Glory" by President Putin on April 27, 2007, for "courage, endurance and mass heroism, exhibited by defenders of the city in the struggle for the freedom and independence of the Motherland".

=== Luga ===
Luga was conferred the status of "City of Military Glory" by President Putin on May 5, 2008, for "courage, endurance and mass heroism, exhibited by defenders of the city in the struggle for the freedom and independence of the Motherland".

=== Lomonosov ===
Lomonosov was conferred the status of "City of Military Glory" by President Medvedev on November 4, 2011, for "courage, endurance and mass heroism, exhibited by defenders of the city in the struggle for the freedom and independence of the Motherland".

=== Malgobek ===
Malgobek was conferred the status of "City of Military Glory" by President Putin on October 8, 2007, for "courage, endurance and mass heroism, exhibited by defenders of the city in the struggle for the freedom and independence of the Motherland".

=== Maloyaroslavets ===
Part of Kaluga Oblast, the small town of Maloyaroslavets was caught up in the action of the Battle of Moscow from October 1941 to January 1942 and thus became, because for the "courage, endurance and mass heroism, exhibited by defenders of the city in the struggle for the freedom and independence of the Motherland" shown during the town's two and a half month German occupation, eligible for the title of City of Military Glory by President Putin, by virtue of Presidential Law No.2012-608, in one of his first official acts as President, on May 7, 2012.

=== Mariupol ===
Mariupol was designated a City of Military Glory by President Vladimir Putin on November 15, 2022, on account of the resistance of its residents during the 3-year long German occupation (1941-1943).

Its award was made to celebrate the Russian offensive that led to its occupation early in the year.

=== Melitopol ===
Melitopol was designated a City of Military Glory by President Vladimir Putin on November 15, 2022, after being captured during the Russian invasion of Ukraine earlier in the year.

=== Mozhaisk ===
Marking the 70th anniversary of its liberation by the Red Army after several months of German control, Mozhaisk was conferred the status of "City of Military Glory" by President Putin on September 2, 2012, for "courage, endurance and mass heroism, exhibited by defenders of the city in the struggle for the freedom and independence of the Motherland". Its bestowment also coincided with the national celebrations of the bicenntenial year of the Battle of Borodino of 1812, fought miles away from the city proper.

=== Nalchik ===
Nalchik, the capital of the Kabardino-Balkar Autonomous Soviet Socialist Republic (now the Kabardino-Balkar Republic), was occupied by Nazi German troops on October 28, 1942. For two months, Soviet troops of the Transcaucasian Front were able to prevent German troops from crossing the Baksan River in an attempt to take Black Sea ports and oil fields, during which the city was heavily damaged. On January 3, 1943 of the 37th Army liberated the city from German control. Some 4,200 people were killed in the conflict.

Nalchik was conferred the status of "City of Military Glory" by President Medvedev on March 25, 2010, for "courage, endurance and mass heroism, exhibited by defenders of the city in the struggle for the freedom and independence of the Motherland".

=== Naro-Fominsk ===
Naro-Fominsk was conferred the status of "City of Military Glory" by President Medvedev on April 27, 2009, for "courage, endurance and mass heroism, exhibited by defenders of the city in the struggle for the freedom and independence of the Motherland".

=== Oryol ===
Oryol was conferred the status of "City of Military Glory" by President Putin on April 27, 2007, for "courage, endurance and mass heroism, exhibited by defenders of the city in the struggle for the freedom and independence of the Motherland".

=== Petropavlovsk-Kamchatsky ===
By virtue of Presidential Law No.2011-1458 of President Medvedev, for the "courage, endurance and mass heroism, exhibited by defenders of the city in the struggle for the freedom and independence of the Motherland", the important eastern Siberian city of Petropavlovsk-Kamchatsky was bestowed upon with the title of "City of Military Glory" on November 3, 2011 due to the outstanding role of the city in the defense of the Pacific coastlines of the Soviet Union during the Second World War's Pacific Theater, especially during the crucial final weeks of the war in the Pacific.

=== Polyarny ===
Polyarny was conferred the status of "City of Military Glory" by President Putin on May 5, 2008, for "courage, endurance and mass heroism, exhibited by defenders of the city in the struggle for the freedom and independence of the Motherland".

=== Pskov ===
Pskov was conferred the status of "City of Military Glory" by President Medvedev on December 5, 2009, for "courage, endurance and mass heroism, exhibited by defenders of the city in the struggle for the freedom and independence of the Motherland".

=== Rostov-on-Don ===
Rostov-on-Don was conferred the status of "City of Military Glory" by President Putin on May 5, 2008, for "courage, endurance and mass heroism, exhibited by defenders of the city in the struggle for the freedom and independence of the Motherland".

=== Rzhev ===
Rzhev was conferred the status of "City of Military Glory" by President Putin on October 8, 2007, for "courage, endurance and mass heroism, exhibited by defenders of the city in the struggle for the freedom and independence of the Motherland" during the long Battles of Rzhev (which occurred from 1941 to 1943).

=== Staraya Russa ===
The town of Staraya Russa was from 1941 to 1944 heavily damaged given the 3 1/2-year German occupation that resulted in the deaths of many of its citizens and giving it a big role in the resistance effort, leading to its February 1944 liberation by the 1st Shock Army as part of the Leningrad–Novgorod Offensive that winter. As the city showed "courage, endurance and mass heroism, exhibited by defenders of the city in the struggle for the freedom and independence of the Motherland" during the years of its Axis occupation and the resistance of its residents against the enemy, on April 9, 2015, as part of the national celebrations of the 70th year anniversary of Victory Day, by virtue of Presidential Law No.2015-175 of President Putin, the "City of Military Glory" title was given at long last to this old town in Novgorod Oblast.

=== Stary Oskol ===
Stary Oskol was conferred the status of "City of Military Glory" by President Medvedev on May 7, 2011, for "courage, endurance and mass heroism, exhibited by defenders of the city in the struggle for the freedom and independence of the Motherland".

=== Taganrog ===
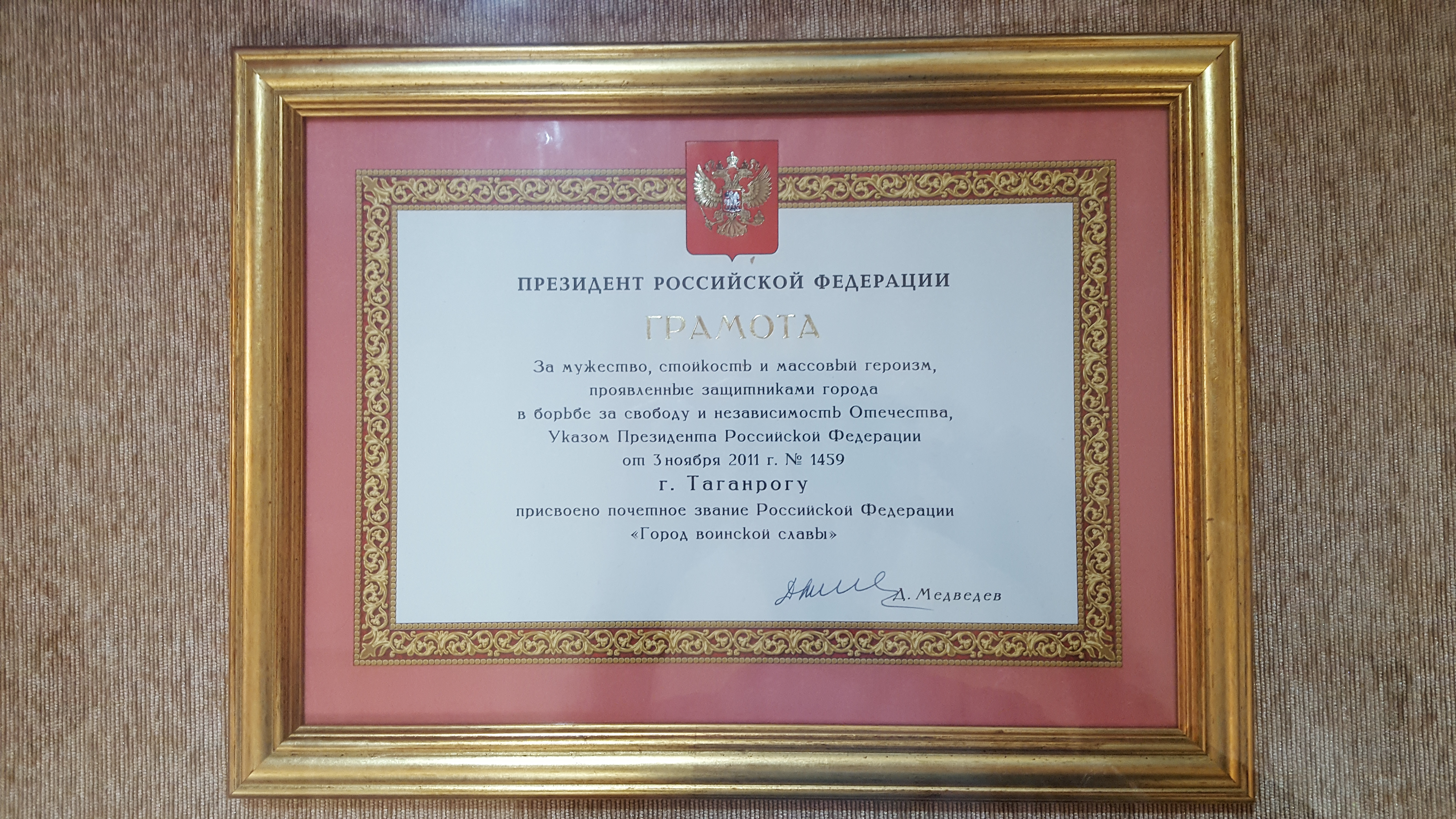
Taganrog City of Military Glory certificate

Taganrog had an eventful history during World War II, from 1941 to 1945. The city was conferred the status of "City of Military Glory" by President Medvedev on November 3, 2011, for "courage, endurance and mass heroism, exhibited by defenders of the city in the struggle for the freedom and independence of the Motherland" during those years.

A ceremony was held in the Moscow Kremlin on February 23, 2012 at which the city was represented by its mayor, Nikolay Fedyanin.

=== Tikhvin ===
Tikhvin was conferred the status of "City of Military Glory" by President Medvedev on November 4, 2010, for "courage, endurance and mass heroism, exhibited by defenders of the city in the struggle for the freedom and independence of the Motherland".

=== Tuapse ===
In July 1942, when Sevastopol fell under Nazi German control, Tuapse became the main naval base for the supply of Soviet troops in the Black Sea region. In August 1942 in the Tuapse Defensive Operation, part of the overall Battle of the Caucasus, Tuapse was the scene of bloody battles between the two forces, and the city was subjected to relentless bombardment by Nazi troops. The Soviet forces managed to halt Nazi troops 23 kilometres (14 mi) from Tuapse, with the loss of some 100,000 lives, and 25,000 dead on the German side. To this day, bodies are still being found in the region, and in the last 10 years, approximately 4,500 bodies have been found and reburied.

Tuapse was conferred the status of "City of Military Glory" by President Putin on May 5, 2008, for "courage, endurance and mass heroism, exhibited by defenders of the city in the struggle for the freedom and independence of the Motherland". A ceremony was held in the Moscow Kremlin on May 6, 2008 at which the city was represented by the Acting Head of the City, Viktor Koshel.

=== Tver ===
Tver was conferred the status of "City of Military Glory" by President Medvedev on November 4, 2010, for "courage, endurance and mass heroism, exhibited by defenders of the city in the struggle for the freedom and independence of the Motherland".

=== Velikiye Luki ===
Velikiye Luki was conferred the status of "City of Military Glory" by President Medvedev on October 28, 2008, for "courage, endurance and mass heroism, exhibited by defenders of the city in the struggle for the freedom and independence of the Motherland".

=== Veliky Novgorod ===
Veliky Novgorod was conferred the status of "City of Military Glory" by President Medvedev on October 28, 2008, for "courage, endurance and mass heroism, exhibited by defenders of the city in the struggle for the freedom and independence of the Motherland".

=== Vladikavkaz ===
The German forces' drive towards oil fields of Grozny and Baku was stopped near Vladikavkaz in the end of 1942.

Vladikavkaz was conferred the status of "City of Military Glory" by President Putin on October 8, 2007, for "courage, endurance and mass heroism, exhibited by defenders of the city in the struggle for the freedom and independence of the Motherland".

=== Vladivostok ===
Vladivostok, the Pacific coast city and the home port of the Russian Navy's Pacific Fleet, was conferred the status of "City of Military Glory" by President Medvedev on November 4, 2010, for "courage, endurance and mass heroism, exhibited by defenders of the city in the struggle for the freedom and independence of the Motherland".

=== Volokolamsk ===
Volokolamsk was the scene of some major battles between Soviet and Nazi troops during the Great Patriotic War, and is where the Panfilovtsy under the command of Ivan Panfilov, and the Katyusha rocket launcher, gained wide recognition. Following orders not to give an inch of soil to the invading German troops, the Panfilovtsy held their defensive lines during a month of heavy fighting. With the loss of 13,000 troops, the Soviet forces held the Germans at bay for long enough in order to allow a counter offensive to take place.

Volokolamsk was conferred the status of "City of Military Glory" by President Medvedev on March 25, 2010, for "courage, endurance and mass heroism, exhibited by defenders of the city in the struggle for the freedom and independence of the Motherland". A ceremony was held in the Moscow Kremlin on May 4, 2010 at which the city was represented by Head of Volokolamsky District, Vyacheslav Karabanov, and Pavel Osipov, a veteran from World War II. At the ceremony Dmitry Anatolyevich Medvedev said that the exploits of the Panfilovtsy “became a true symbol of courage and selflessness”.

=== Voronezh ===
Voronezh was conferred the status of "City of Military Glory" by President Putin on February 16, 2008, for "courage, endurance and mass heroism, exhibited by defenders of the city in the struggle for the freedom and independence of the Motherland".

=== Vyazma ===
Vyazma in Smolensk Oblast was occupied by Nazi German forces on October 7, 1941 after fierce battles with the Red Army. The 19th, 20th, 24th and 32nd Soviet field armies, along with civil guardsmen, held up large numbers of German troops in their advance towards Moscow. Vyazma was liberated by the Soviets on March 12, 1943 during the Rzhev-Vyazma operation.

Vyazma was conferred the status of "City of Military Glory" by President Medvedev on April 27, 2009, for "courage, endurance and mass heroism, exhibited by defenders of the city in the struggle for the freedom and independence of the Fatherland”. A ceremony was held in the Moscow Kremlin on 8 May 2009 at which the city was represented by Head of the Vyazemsky Municipal District, Viktor Semeykin.

=== Vyborg ===
Before World War II Vyborg was one of the oldest and populous city of Finland (Finnish: Viipuri). It was lost to the Soviet Union after the Winter War according to Moscow Peace Treaty 1940. In the Continuation War (part of the Eastern Front) Germany's co-belligerent Finland conquered Vyborg essentially without a fight in August 1941. In June 1944, troops led by Soviet army general Marshal Leonid Govorov, as part of the Vyborg–Petrozavodsk Offensive broke through the Vammelsuu-Taipale line and Vyborg was captured by the Soviet Union again. Some 23,500 Soviet troops lost their lives in the attack for Vyborg. As a result of the offensive, the Moscow Armistice was signed between Finland, on the one hand, and the Soviet Union and Britain on the other and ended hostilities between the countries. Vyborg remained as a part of the Soviet Union.

Vyborg was conferred the status of "City of Military Glory" by President Medvedev on March 25, 2010, for "courage, endurance and mass heroism, exhibited by defenders of the city in the struggle for the freedom and independence of the Motherland". A ceremony was held in the Moscow Kremlin on 4 May 2010 at which the city was represented by the Head of the Administration of Vyborgsky District Konstantin Patrayev.

=== Yelets ===
Yelets was conferred the status of "City of Military Glory" by President Putin on October 8, 2007, for "courage, endurance and mass heroism, exhibited by defenders of the city in the struggle for the freedom and independence of the Motherland".

=== Yelnya ===
Yelnya was conferred the status of a town of military glory by President Putin on October 8, 2007, for "courage, endurance, and mass heroism, exhibited by defenders of the town in the struggle for the freedom and independence of the Motherland".

== See also ==
- Hero City
- Hero City of the Socialist Federal Republic of Yugoslavia
