= Cincomarzada =

1838 battle of the First Carlist War

- Part of First Carlist War
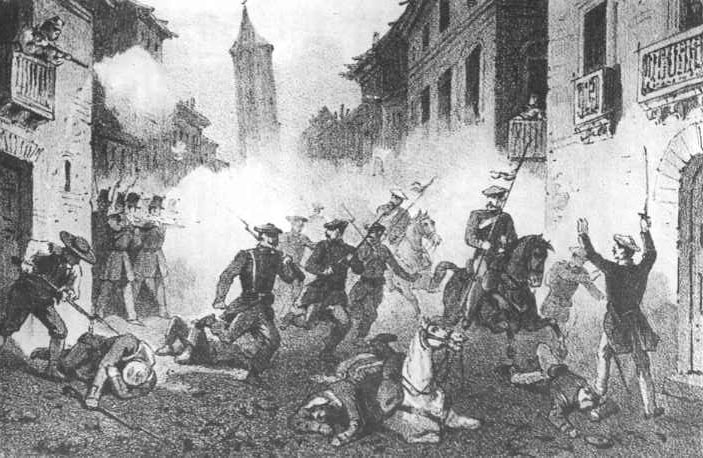
- Soldiers and citizens shooting at retreating Carlist soldiers.
| Date | 5 March 1838 |
| Location | Zaragoza, Aragon, Spain |
| Result | Liberal victory |

Belligerents
| Carlists | Liberals |

Commanders and leaders
| Juan Cabañero y Esponera | None, spontaneous uprising |

Strength
| 2,800 infantry men 300 cavalry men | Unknown |

The Cincomarzada was a failed Carlist attempt to conquer the city of Zaragoza on 5 March 1838. Nowadays it is a popular holiday in Zaragoza commemorating the heroic behaviour of the citizens during the First Carlist War.

== Background ==
Zaragoza held a very strategic position, garrisoned by a good amount of liberal troops. As the Carlist army was supposedly far away, most of the garrison soldiers were sent away in February 1838 to strengthen an army that had to fight against Basilio Garcia's expedition, who was trying to reach the Maestrazgo and join with Cabrera from La Mancha. When Cabrera heard that Zaragoza was almost defenceless, he sent Juan Cabañero y Esponera to seize the city with 2800 infantry and 300 cavalry. He simply wanted to plunder the city, as those men were not enough to keep Zaragoza for long in Carlist hands.

== Battle ==
The night of 5 March 1838, Juan Cabañero's troops occupied most of the city by surprise, but faced to the resistance of its inhabitants and the news that the garrisons were coming back, the Carlists fled. After the failure of the Carlist army, the city received the title of "Siempre Heroica" (always heroic) and a street was named after this day (Cinco de Marzo).

== Curiosities ==
It is said that after seizing the city, Cabañero ordered a hot chocolate, but he had to run away before tasting it. In 1840, when he had already joined the Liberals and he went to Zaragoza as part of the Liberal Army to fight against Cabrera, the zaragozans were shouting at him: "Cabañero, your chocolate is already cold!"
