= List of aircraft at the Imperial War Museum Duxford =

This list of aircraft at the Imperial War Museum Duxford summarises the collection of aircraft that is housed at the Imperial War Museum Duxford in Cambridgeshire, England.

== AirSpace Hangar ==
Aircraft on display that are the property or on loan to the Imperial War Museum or the Duxford Aviation Society:

Type	Image	Identity	Markings/notes
Airco DH.9		D5649	Royal Air Force/Royal Flying Corps
Airspeed Oxford I		V3388	Royal Air Force
Avro Canada CF-100 Canuck		18393	Royal Canadian Air Force
Avro Lancaster X		KB889	Royal Canadian Air Force – No. 428 Squadron, coded NA-I
Avro Vulcan B.2		XJ824	Royal Air Force – No. 101 Squadron
BAC TSR.2		XR222	Royal Air Force
Concorde		G-AXDN	Former pre-production development aircraft G-AXDN was donated to the society and flown to Duxford in 1977.
English Electric Lightning F.1		XM135	Royal Air Force – No. 74 (Fighter) Squadron markings, coded B
Fairey Swordfish		NF370	Royal Air Force – No. 119 Squadron, coded NH-L
Gloster Javelin FAW.9		XH897	Aeroplane & Armament Experimental Establishment markings
Handley Page Hastings C.1A		TG528	Royal Air Force – No. 24 Squadron
Handley Page Victor B.1		XH648	Royal Air Force – No. 57 Squadron
Hawker Siddeley Harrier GR.3		XZ133	Royal Air Force, coded 10
Miles Magister I		G-AFBS	In wartime Royal Air Force colour scheme but with civil registration.
Panavia Tornado GR.1		ZA465	Royal Air Force – No. 12 Squadron, coded FF
Royal Aircraft Factory R.E.8		F3556	Royal Air Force/Royal Flying Corps
Short Sunderland MR.5		ML796	Royal Air Force, it is a former French Navy aircraft
Supermarine Spitfire F.24		VN485	Royal Air Force
Westland Lysander		V9673	Royal Air Force – No. 161 Squadron markings, coded MA-J, a former Royal Canadian Air Force aircraft.
Westland Wessex HAS.1		XS863	Fleet Air Arm – 815 NAS, coded 304/R
Westland Whirlwind HAS.7		XK936	Fleet Air Arm

== Air and Sea ==
Type	Image	Identity	Markings/notes
Avro Anson I		N4877	Royal Air Force – No. 500 Squadron markings, coded MK-V
BAC Strikemaster		1133	Royal Saudi Air Force
de Havilland Mosquito TT.35		TA719	Royal Air Force
de Havilland Sea Vixen FAW.2		XS576	Fleet Air Arm – 899 NAS, coded 125
Fairey Gannet ECM.6		XG797	Fleet Air Arm – 831 NAS markings, coded 277
Fairey Firefly TT.I		Z2033	275-N/Evelyn Tensions
Hawker Sea Hawk FB.5		WM969	Fleet Air Arm
Hawker Siddeley Buccaneer S.2B		XV865	Royal Air Force – No. 208 Squadron
Percival Proctor III		LZ766	G-ALCK Royal Air Force
Westland Sea King HAS.6		XV712	Fleet Air Arm
Westland Wasp HAS.1		XS567	Fleet Air Arm, coded 434

Airworthy aircraft

Type	Image	Identity	Markings/notes
Airco DH.9		E8894	CAA Reg-G-CDLI Operator-Historic Aircraft Collection Ltd
Bristol Blenheim IF		L6739	YP-Q CAA Reg-G-BPIV Operator-Aircraft Restoration Company Ltd
Hawker Fury I		K5674	CAA Reg-G-CBZP Operator-Historic Aircraft Collection Ltd
Hawker Sea Fury FB.11		SR661	(P) Operator-Fighter Aviation Engineering Ltd
Hawker Nimrod II		K3661	562 CAA Reg-G-BURZ Operator-Historic Aircraft Collection Ltd
Hawker Hurricane I		P2902	DX-R CAA Reg-G-ROBT Operator-Fighter Aviation Engineering Ltd
Hawker Hurricane XII		R4118	UP-W CAA Reg-G-HUPW Owner-Hurricane Heritage Ltd Operator-Aircraft Restoration Company Ltd
Hawker Hurricane TR.2B		BE505	XP-L Pegs CAA Reg-G-HHII Owner-Hurriback Operator-Aircraft Restoration Company Ltd
Hawker Tempest II		MW763/PR533	5R-V CAA Reg-G-TEMT Operator-Fighter Aviation Engineering Ltd
Lockheed 12A Electra Junior			CAA Reg-G-AFTL Operator-Fighter Aviation Engineering Ltd
North American P-51D Mustang		413521	5Q-B/Marinell CAA Reg-G-MRLL Owned-Marinell Ltd Operator-Aircraft Restoration Company Ltd
North American P-51D Mustang		472216	HO/M/Miss Helen CAA Reg-G-BIXL Owned-Robert Tyrrell Operator-Aircraft Restoration Company Ltd
CAC CA-18 Mustang 22		415152	QI-T/Jersey Jerk CAA Reg-G-JERK Operator-Fighter Aviation Engineering Ltd
Republic P-47D Thunderbolt		549192	F4-J/Nellie B CAA Reg-G-THUN Operator-Fighter Aviation Engineering Ltd
Supermarine Spitfire VB		BM597	JH-C CAA Reg-G-MKVB Owned-Aerial Speed Icons Ltd Operator-Aircraft Restoration Company
Supermarine Spitfire VC		EE602	DV-V/Central Railways Uruguayan Staff CAA Reg-G-IBSY Operator-Fighter Aviation Engineering Ltd
Supermarine Spitfire LF.IXB		MH434	ZD-B Mylcraine CAA Reg-G-ASJV Owned-Merlin Aviation Ltd Operated-Aircraft Restoration Company Ltd
Supermarine Spitfire HF.VIIIC		MT928	ZX-M CAA Reg-G-BKMI Owned-Max-Alpha Aviation GMBH Operator-Aircraft Restoration Company Ltd
Supermarine Spitfire FR.XIVE		MV293	Z CAA Reg-G-SPIT Operator-Fighter Aviation Engineering Ltd
Supermarine Spitfire LF.XVIE		RN201	CAA Reg-G-BSKP Owned-Aerial Speed Icons Ltd Operator-Aircraft Restoration Company
Supermarine Spitfire LF.XVIE		RW382	WZ-RR CAA Reg-G-PBIX Operator-The Suffolk Spitfire

== Battle of Britain ==
Imperial War Museum Battle Of Britain Collection.

Type	Image	Identity	Markings/notes
Avro 671 Rota I		HM580	KX-K
Bristol F.2B Fighter		E2581	Royal Air Force/Royal Flying Corps – No. 39 Squadron, coded 13
de Havilland Vampire T.11		WZ590	Royal Air Force – No. 5 FTS, coded 49
Gloster Meteor F.8		WK991	Royal Air Force – No. 56 (Fighter) Squadron
Hawker Hurricane I		V7497	SD-X CAA Reg-G-HRLI Owned-Hurricane 501 Operations LLP Operated-Aircraft Restoration Company Ltd
Hawker Hurricane IIB		Z2315	Royal Air Force – No. 111 Squadron markings, coded JU-E, aircraft recovered from Russia
Hawker Hunter F.6A		XE627	Royal Air Force – No. 65 Squadron markings, on loan from the United States Air Force.
McDonnell Douglas Phantom FGR.2		XV474	Royal Air Force – No. 74 (Fighter) Squadron, coded T
Messerschmitt Bf 109E-3		1190	Luftwaffe aircraft that force landed in 1940, presented in the position of the crash.
Mikoyan-Gurevich MiG-21		501	Hungarian Air Force
Panavia Tornado GR.4		ZA469	Royal Air Force – Marham Wing, coded 029
Royal Aircraft Factory B.E.2C		2699	
Supermarine Spitfire IA		N3200	QV CAA Reg-G-CFGJ Owned-Imperial War Museum Operator-Aircraft Restoration Company Ltd

== Conservation in Action ==
Imperial War Museum Restoration Hangar.

Type	Image	Identity	Markings/notes
Avro Shackleton MR.3		XF708	Royal Air Force – No. 203 Squadron, coded C
FMA IA 58 Pucará		ZD487 [A-549]	Argentine Air Force captured during the Falklands War
Heinkel He 162 A-2 Salamander		120235	Yellow 6

== American Air Museum ==
Aircraft owned or on loan to the Imperial War Museum and displayed in the American Air Museum:

Type	Image	Identity	Markings/notes
Bell UH-1H Huey		72-21605	United States Army
Boeing B-17G Flying Fortress		231983	F-BDRS was operated by the French Institut géographique national (National Geographic Institute) before acquisition in 1974 as a spare parts source for the airworthy Sally B. In 1978 it was donated to the Imperial War Museum and displayed as 231983 IY-G of the 401st Bomb Group United States Army Air Forces based at RAF Deenethorpe which was named Mary Alice.
Boeing B-52D Stratofortress		56-0689	United States Air Force, on display outside since 1983 and moved inside the American Air Museum in 1997.
Boeing B-29A Superfortress		44-61748	A former United States Air Force B-29A, it was recovered from the China Lake range in 1979, restored to flying condition as G-BHDK and flown across the Atlantic to Duxford, arriving in March 1980. Painted as 461748 to represent an aircraft of the 501st Bomb Group United States Army Air Forces and named It's Hawg Wild. On loan from the United States Navy.
Boeing-Stearman PT-17		41-8169 (CF-EQS)[25]	Painted as 25 of the United States Army it was a static restoration mainly using bits from a former Canadian-owned example CF-EQS.
Consolidated B-24M Liberator		44-50493	44-51228 was the last B-24 in United States Air Force service, being used for ice research before being retired in 1953. It was placed on display at Lackland Air Force Base. Built by Ford at Willow Run it was donated to the museum by the Ford Motor Company arriving in 1999. Painted as 44-50493 of the 392nd Bombardment Group/578th Bombardment Squadron United States Army Air Force based at RAF Wendling in Norfolk, England, and named Dugan.
Douglas C-47A Skytrain		43-15509	Painted in the markings it flew in 1944 as an aircraft of the 316th Troop Carrier Group/37th Troop Carrier Squadron based at RAF Cottesmore, Rutland.
Fairchild Republic A-10 Thunderbolt II		77-0259	A-10A 77-0259 was last flown by the 10th Tactical Fighter Wing and it was flown to Duxford on retirement from the United States Air Force in 1992 from its base at nearby RAF Alconbury. On loan from the United States Air Force.
General Dynamics F-111E		67-0120	A veteran of Operation Desert Storm, it was based at RAF Upper Heyford with the 20th Fighter Wing of the United States Air Force prior to arriving at Duxford for display in 1993. On loan from the United States Air Force Museum.
Lockheed SR-71A Blackbird		61-7962	17962 was loaned to the museum in 2001 by the United States Air Force Museum to represent the aircraft based at RAF Mildenhall.
Lockheed U-2C		56-6692	Operated by the United States Air Force from 1956 until retired and presented to the museum in 1992 to represent the type as flown at nearby RAF Alconbury.
McDonnell Douglas F-4J(UK) Phantom		155529	ZE359 is a former United States Navy F-4J from 1968 until it was converted to a F-4J(UK) for service with the Royal Air Force from 1984. Flown to Duxford on retirement and restores to original United States Navy markings of VF-74 as 155529.
McDonnell Douglas F-15A Eagle		76-0020	Flown by the United States Air Force from 1976 to 1994. Allocated to the Imperial War Museum in 2001 and later painted to represent the aircraft when it served with the 5th Fighter Interceptor Squadron. On loan from the United States Air Force Museum.
North American AT-16 Harvard II			B-168
North American B-25J Mitchell		44-31171 (43-4064)	Retired from service as a TB-25J trainer with the United States Air Force in 1957 it then had various civil owners before being delivered to Duxford in 1976. Since 1996 it has been displayed as 44-31171, a PBJ-1J of the United States Marine Corps. It has now been repainted to represent B-25J 43-4064 "LI'L Critter From the Moon" of the 488th Bomb Squadron, 340th Bomb Group of the USAAF's Twelfth Air Force in the latter stages of the Second World War.
North American P-51D Mustang		44-11631	MX-V Etta Jeanne II
Republic P-47D Thunderbolt		226413	A composite static rebuild painted to represent an aircraft of the 78th Fighter Group based at Duxford.
SPAD XIII			This replica SPAD was built in Germany and flown in the United Kingdom since 1978. It was placed in the Fleet Air Arm museum in 1986 and transferred to Duxford in 1996. Painted as S.4513 to represent an aircraft flown in 1918 by Captain Rickenbacker with the United States Army Air Service in France.

== Duxford Aviation Society Apron ==
Aircraft owned or on loan to the Duxford Aviation Society:

Type	Image	Identity	Markings/notes
Airspeed Ambassador 2		G-ALZO	The only surviving Ambassador; operated by British European Airways (BEA) from 1952 to 1958, it was then used by the Royal Jordanian Air Force as a VIP aircraft. It was bought by Dan-Air in 1963 and operated until 1971 when it went on display at Lasham Airfield. Donated to the Duxford Aviation Society in 1986 and moved to Duxford still painted in Dan-Air markings.
Avro York		G-ANTK	In the markings of Dan-Air, its last operator. Originally operated by the Royal Air Force from 1946, it was used on the Berlin Airlift. Sold to Dan-Air in 1954 which flew it until 1964. After retirement it was on display at Lasham Airfield until it was transferred to the Duxford Aviation Society and moved to Duxford in 1986 for a 20-year restoration programme.
BAC One Eleven 500		G-AVMU	Operated by BEA from 1969 until British Overseas Airways Corporation (BOAC) and BEA merged to form British Airways in 1972. After retirement by British Airways it was donated to the society and flown to Duxford in 1993. Displayed in the British Airways Landor Associates livery and named County of Dorset.
BAC Super VC10		G-ASGC	Former BOAC and British Airways aircraft, painted in BOAC-Cunard markings which it wore when it was operated by the 1960s' joint venture between BOAC and Cunard Line. Donated and flown to Duxford in 1980.
British Aerospace 146 CC2		ZE701	Formerly of No. 32 Squadron RAF. Donated by the Royal Air Force on 21 January 2022, ZE701 replaced Handley Page Dart Herald G-APWJ's placement on the apron after a brief period of restoration work.
Bristol Britannia 312		G-AOVT	Had been operated by BOAC and British Eagle but retains the colours of the last operator Monarch Airlines. Donated to the society by Monarch Airlines and flown to Duxford in 1975.
Britten-Norman BN-2A-III Trislander		G-BEVT	Formerly of Aurigny Air Services, operated short-haul flights in and around the British Isles. Obtained by the museum in 2017
de Havilland Dove		G-ALFU	Used as a navaid calibration aircraft with the Civil Aviation Flying Unit (CAFU) from 1948 until 1972. Donated to the IWM in 1973 and moved to Duxford, transferred to the society in 1984; it is displayed in CAFU markings.
de Havilland Comet		G-APDB	Former Dan-Air aircraft; painted in the markings of its first operator BOAC, which operated it from 1958. Donated by Dan-Air in 1974 and flown to Duxford.
Hawker Siddeley Trident 2E		G-AVFB	Painted in British European Airways markings to represent the first operator of the aircraft between 1968 and 1972. Used by Cyprus Airways until it suffered damage during the Turkish invasion of Cyprus and was abandoned at Nicosia airport. It was recovered by British Airways and repaired; and continued in service until 1982, when it was donated to the society and flown to Duxford.
Vickers Viscount 701		G-ALWF	Painted to represent a Viscount of British European Airways with the original name Sir John Franklin. Whiskey Foxtrot was the second production aircraft and was delivered to British European Airways in 1953. The last operator was Cambrian Airways. She was retired in 1971 and placed on display at Liverpool Airport with the Viscount Preservation Trust. Transferred to the Duxford Aviation Society and moved to Duxford by road in 1976.
