= General North =

General North may refer to:

- Gary L. North (born 1954), U.S. Air Force four-star general
- Kenneth North (1930–2010), U.S. Air Force brigadier general
- William North (1755–1836), U.S. Army brigadier general
- William North, 6th Baron North (1678–1734), British Army lieutenant general and Spanish Army general
