= 401st Air Expeditionary Group =

401st Air Expeditionary Group

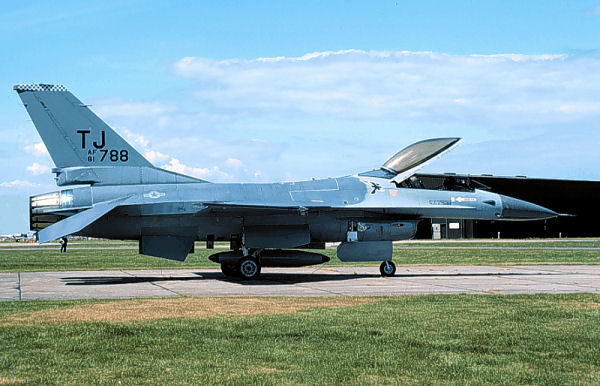
- General Dynamics F-16 Fighting Falcon of the 612th Tactical Fighter Squadron.
- Active: 1943–1945; 1947–1951; 1954–1957; 1957–1994; 2001–present
- Country: United States
- Branch: United States Air Force
- Role: Manage deployed forces
- Motto: Cælum Arena Nostra (Latin for 'The Sky is Our Arena')
- Engagements: European theater of World War II
- Decorations: Distinguished Unit Citation; Air Force Outstanding Unit Award w/Combat "V" Device; Air Force Outstanding Unit Award

Commanders
- Notable commanders: Wilbur L. Creech, Kenneth North

Insignia
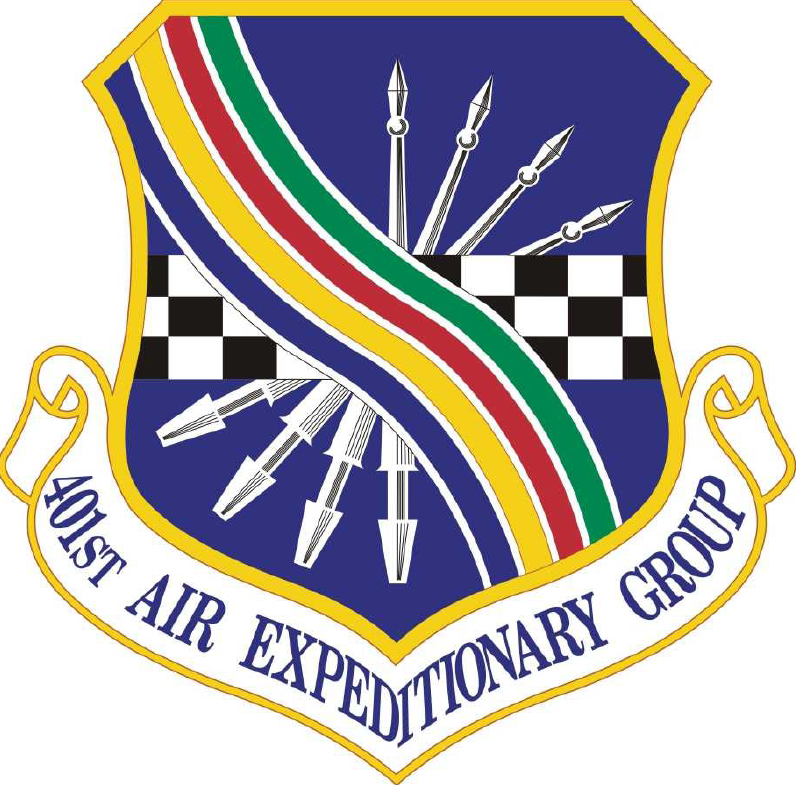
- 401st Air Expeditionary Group emblem

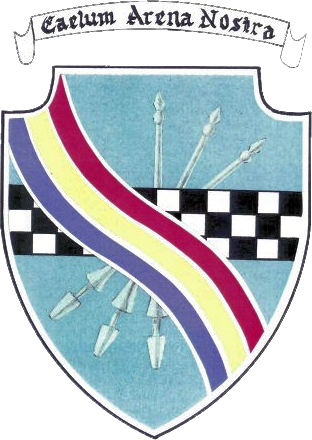
- 401st Fighter-Bomber Group emblem (Note: Approved 9 September 1958.)

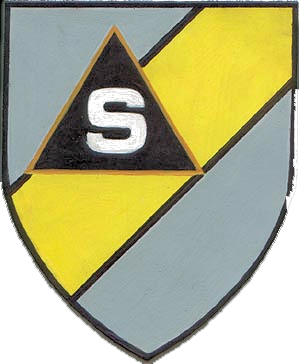
- 401st Bombardment Group emblem
- World War II Tail Code: Triangle S

The 401st Air Expeditionary Group is a provisional United States Air Force unit assigned to United States Air Forces in Europe to be activated or inactivated at any time as needed. It is stationed at Ramstein Air Base, Germany.

The group was first activated as the 401st Bombardment Group during World War II. The 401st entered combat with VIII Bomber Command, flying Boeing B-17 Flying Fortresses from RAF Deenethorpe. The group earned two Distinguished Unit Citations for missions over Leipzig on 11 January and 20 February 1944. The 401st Bomb Group had the second best rating in bombing accuracy for Eighth Air Force.

The group was activated briefly as an Air Force Reserve unit in 1947, but apparently was minimally manned. It was called to active duty in 1951 for the Korean War, but its personnel were used as fillers for other units and the group was soon inactivated.

The group was again active in the 1950s as the 401st Fighter-Bomber Group at England AFB, Louisiana. It was inactivated in 1957 when Tactical Air Command (TAC) replaced its groups reporting directly to TAC numbered air forces with like numbered wings and its squadrons were transferred to the 401st Fighter-Bomber Wing.

The 401st Fighter-Bomber Wing flew North American F-100 Super Sabres at England for the next nine years. In 1965 and 1966 most of the operational squadrons of the wing were transferred to Pacific Air Forces and moved to Japan or the Republic of Vietnam. The wing and its remaining squadron transferred to Torrejon Air Base, Spain, replacing a Strategic Air Command wing there. In 1984 the group and wing were consolidated into a single unit.

In 1991, United States units departed Spain, and the 401st moved to Aviano Air Base, Italy, where it replaced the 40th Support Wing, originally managing deployed fighter squadrons, but from 1992 was once again assigned its own tactical units. In 1994, it was replaced in turn by the 31st Fighter Wing. The 401st became a provisional unit in 2001 and is assigned to United States Air Forces Europe to activate or inactivate as needed for contingency operations.

== History ==
=== World War II ===
==== Organization and training for combat ====
The 401st Bombardment Group was activated March 1943 at Ephrata Army Air Base Washington. Its original squadrons were the 612th, 613th, 614th. and 615th Bombardment Squadrons, The initial cadre for the group was drawn from the 395th Bombardment Group at Ephrata and the 383d Bombardment Group at Rapid City Army Air Field, South Dakota. The cadre soon departed for Orlando Army Air Base, Florida, where they conducted simulated combat missions with the Army Air Forces School of Applied Tactics out of Brooksville Army Air Field.

The ground echelon moved to Geiger Field, Washington in May 1943 and to Great Falls AAB, Montana in July. At Great Falls the first combat crews were assigned to the group. In the final stage of training the squadrons dispersed with the 612th remaining at Great Falls, while the 613th trained at Cut Bank Army Air Field, the 614th at Glasgow Army Air Field, and the 615th at Lewiston Army Air Field.

After completing training the ground echelon left for overseas on 19 October 1943. After staging at Camp Shanks, New York they embarked on the RMS Queen Mary and sailed on 27 October disembarking at Greenock on the Firth of Clyde on 3 November 1943. The air echelon staged for deployment at Scott Field, Illinois then flew to England under the control of Air Transport Command via Newfoundland, Iceland and Scotland.

==== Combat in the European Theater ====
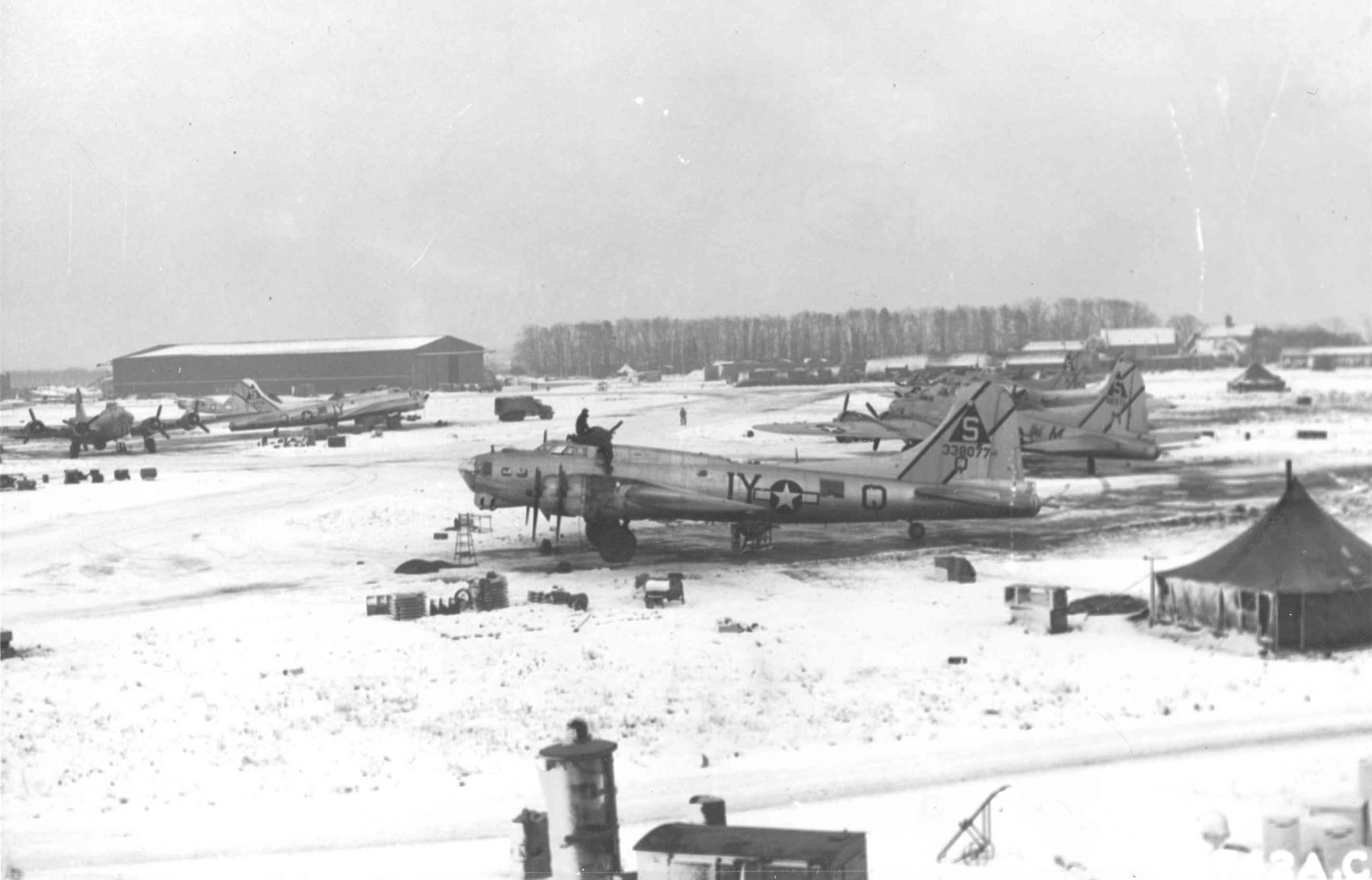
B-17s of the 615th Bomb Squadron at Deenethorpe (Note: Boeing B-17G Flying Fortress, serial 43-338077 is in the foreground.)

On arrival in England, half of the group's aircrews were immediately reassigned to the 351st Bombardment Group. The rest of the group became part of Eighth Air Force at RAF Deenethorpe. The 401st was assigned to the 92d Combat Bombardment Wing of the 1st Bombardment Division.

On 26 November the 401st flew its first combat mission against Bremen, Germany. It did not suffer the combat loss of an airplane until its ninth mission on 30 December. The 401st operated chiefly against strategic targets, bombing industries, submarine facilities, shipyards, missile sites, marshalling yards, and airfields. On 11 January 1944 the group led the 1st Bombardment Division in an attack against aircraft manufacturing facilities at Ochsersleben, Germany. Although the bombers were able to attack, poor weather conditions prevented the division from receiving effective fighter cover. For over three hours the bomber formation suffered more than 400 attacks by Luftwaffe fighters, including air-to-air rocket attacks. Despite these attacks, the unit continued on its mission and struck a telling blow against German aircraft production for which the group was awarded the Distinguished Unit Citation (DUC).

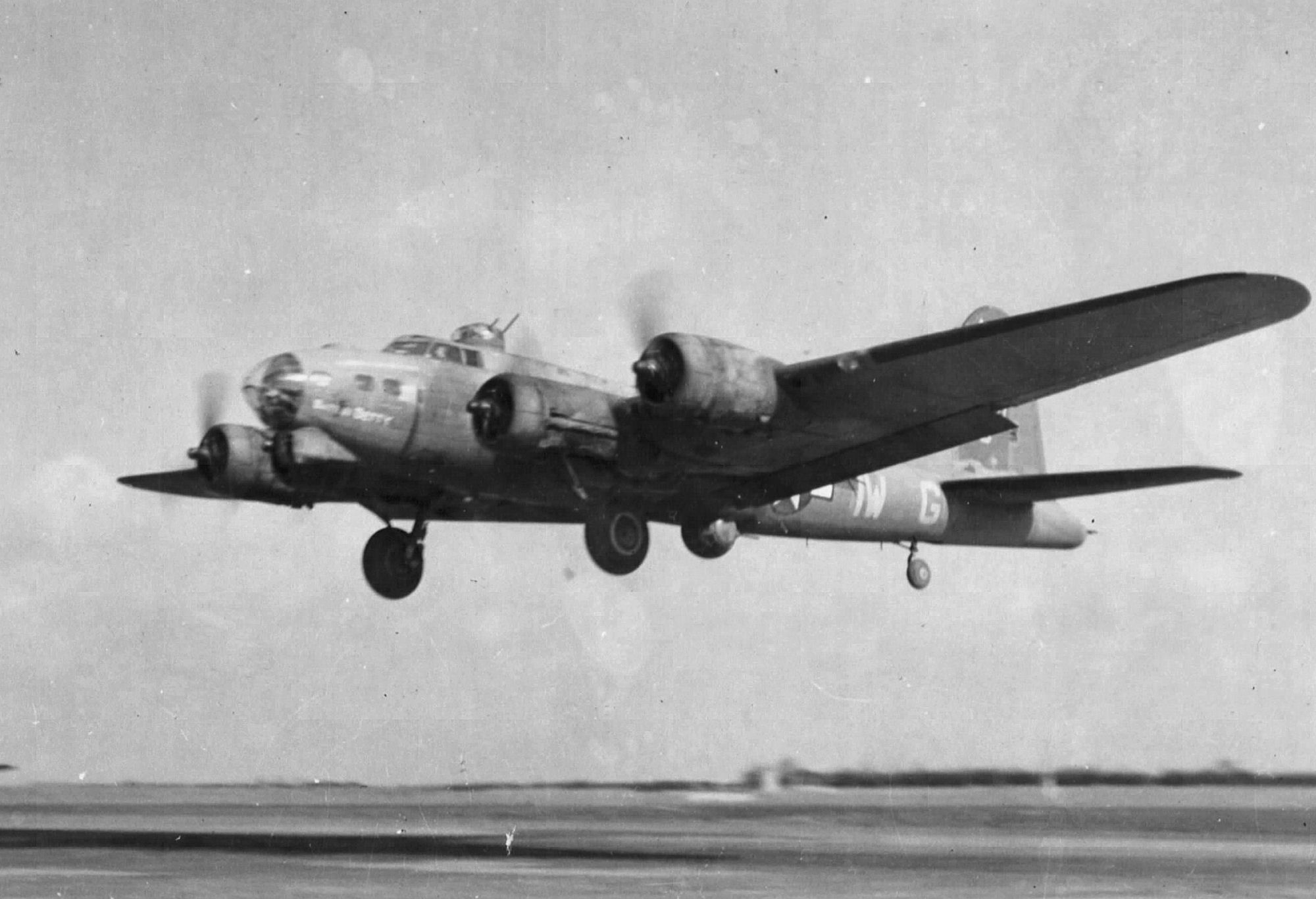
614th Bombardment Squadron B-17G landing at Deenethorpe

A little over a month later, on 20 February, the group earned its second DUC for an attack on the Erla Maschinenwerke aircraft manufacturing facilities in Leipzig, Germany. Despite fighter attacks and battle damage to the group's planes, 100% of the group’s bombs fell within 1000 feet of the aiming point. Beginning in October 1944, the unit concentrated its attacks on Axis oil reserves.

In addition to strategic missions, group operations included attacks on transportation, airfields, and fortifications prior to the Normandy invasion. On D-Day the 401st attacked Normandy beachhead areas dropping bombs five minutes before troops landed. The following month it provided close air support for Operation Cobra, the breakthrough at Saint-Lô, it also supported the siege of Brest in August and Operation Market Garden in September. During the Battle of the Bulge in December 1944 and January 1945, the unit attacked transportation and communications in the battle area. It supported airborne forces involved in Operation Varsity, the airborne assault across the Rhine, in March 1945.

The group's worst accident occurred in December 1943 when a Fortress which failed to get off the ground careened over farmland and came to rest after crashing into a cottage on the edge of the village of Deenethorpe. The surviving members of the crew just had time to evacuate the wreckage and warn the villagers of the imminent explosion of the bomb load before it detonated damaging many houses in the village. The blast was felt in Kettering nine miles away.

Lt Carl Hoag, a navigator with the group was awarded the Distinguished Service Cross for navigating his damaged plane back to UK from a mission to Bohlen. Lt Hoat was blinded in one eye and his vision in other eye impaired by injury. Despite these injuries, he was able to provide the pilot with directions to safely return the plane and crew to Deenthorpe.

The group flew its last combat mission on 20 April 1945 against Brandenberg. The group had flown 254 combat missions from Deenethorpe airfield, 91 aircraft were lost in action with the lowest loss rate of any group in Eighth Air Force. The group's heaviest combat loss had occurred on 28 May 1944 when it lost seven aircraft.

After V-E Day, the group flew missions to Linz, Austria to evacuate British and French prisoners of war. It also flew "Trolley" sightseeing missions at low level, flying ground support personnel over the Ruhr and Frankfurt am Main to see the damage that had been done as a result of their efforts.

The group was alerted for redeployment to the Pacific Theater and the last plane departed Deenethorpe on 3 June. The ground echelon sailed on the RMS Queen Elizabeth on the fifth. Upon arrival in the US, personnel were granted thirty days leave, reassembling at Sioux Falls Army Air Field, South Dakota, but plans had changed and personnel were either transferred to Boeing B-29 Superfortress units or processed for discharge and the group was inactivated.

=== Cold War ===
==== Air Force reserve ====
During the early years of the Cold War the unit was redesignated as the 401st Bombardment Group, Very Heavy and was allotted to the Air Force Reserve. It was activated on 26 June 1947 by Air Defense Command at Brooks Field, Texas, but there is no indication the group was fully manned or equipped. The 401st was redesignated the 401st Bombardment Group, Medium in June 1949 and moved to Biggs Air Force Base, Texas where it became an associate of the active duty 95th Bombardment Group. The 401st was called to active duty on 1 May 1951 during the Korean War. Its personnel were reassigned to other units and it was inactivated on 25 June 1951.

==== Tactical Air Command ====
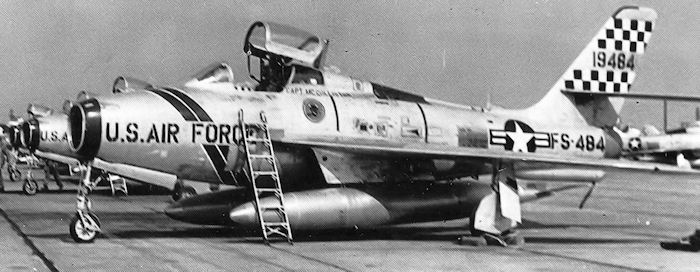
Wing F-84F Thunderstreak (Note: Aircraft is General Motors built Republic F-84F-35-GK Thunderstreak, serial 51-9484.)

The 401st was redesignated as a Tactical Air Command fighter-bomber group in 1953 and activated on 8 February 1954 at Alexandria Air Force Base, Louisiana. The group was equipped initially with North American F-86F Sabres returned from combat in Korea. The group was assigned three of its old squadrons, the 612th, 613th and 614th Fighter-Bomber Squadrons. The group was attached to the 366th Fighter-Bomber Wing at Alexandria (later England Air Force Base), and its mission was to perform advanced fighter training on high performance jet aircraft.

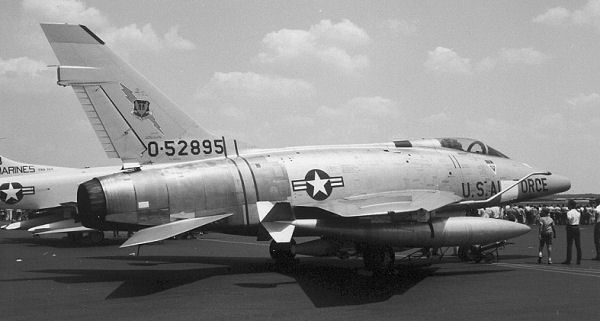
Wing F-100D Super Sabre (Note: Aircraft is North American F-100D-50-NH Super Sabre, serial 55-2895.)

In 1955, the group converted to Republic F-84F Thunderstreaks, performing its training mission until 25 September 1957 when it was inactivated and its component squadrons were assigned directly to newly activated 401st Fighter-Bomber Wing. (Note: Although the 401st Wing was a new organization, it continued, through temporary bestowal, the history, and honors of the 401st Bombardment Group.) At the same time the wing transitioned into the North American F-100 Super Sabre aircraft and gained a fourth tactical squadron, the 615th Fighter-Bomber Squadron. Less than a year after activation, the wing and its squadrons dropped the "fighter-bomber" designation for "tactical fighter". In 1959 the 401st wing became the host organization for England AFB when the 834th Air Division and 366th Tactical Fighter Wing inactivated.

The 401st participated in numerous firepower demonstrations, tactical exercises and maneuvers in the United States and overseas, and periodically deployed its tactical squadrons to bases in Europe and the Middle East to support NATO. With the exception of its elements deployed overseas, the wing operated from Homestead AFB, Florida during the Cuban Missile Crisis from October to December 1962.

From February 1964 to November 1965, wing's squadron deployments shifted to the Far East and Southeast Asia in support of operations in that area. In November, the wing's 612th Tactical Fighter Squadron moved to Misawa Air Base, Japan. The 90th Tactical Fighter Squadron was attached to the wing while it equipped with F-100s before moving to Bien Hoa Air Base, Republic of Viet Nam. The wing then briefly returned to support operations in Europe-Middle East. When the 614th and 615th Tactical Fighter Squadrons moved to Phu Cat Air Base and Phan Rang Air Base in the spring of 1966, the wing was left with a single operational squadron. In 1966 fighter operations at England ceased and were replaced by special operations training. on 27 April the wing and its remaining squadron moved to Europe.

==== United States Air Forces Europe ====
===== Torrejon Air Base =====
Prior to 1965, Torrejon AB hosted deployed squadrons of Boeing B-47 Stratojet aircraft rotating from CONUS Strategic Air Command (SAC) bases. Although B-47 deployments ceased, Boeing KC-135 Stratotanker deployments to support Operation Chrome Dome continued, but on a reduced basis, and the base was transferred to United States Air Forces Europe (USAFE). With the USAFE takeover of the base, the Air Force transferred the 401st Tactical Fighter Wing from England Air Force Base to USAFE on a permanent basis to Torrejon to perform host functions at the base and to support the rotational fighter deployments to Italy and Turkey for NATO alerts. The 613th (Note: Yellow/Black Tails, Tail Code TL.) moved with the wing, where it was joined by the 307th Tactical Fighter Squadron (Note: Tail Code TJ.) from Homestead Air Force Base, Florida, and the 353d Tactical Fighter Squadron (Note: Tail Code TK.) from Myrtle Beach Air Force Base, South Carolina. The wing's 401st Combat Support Group took over the support functions, personnel, and equipment of SAC's 3970th Strategic Wing.

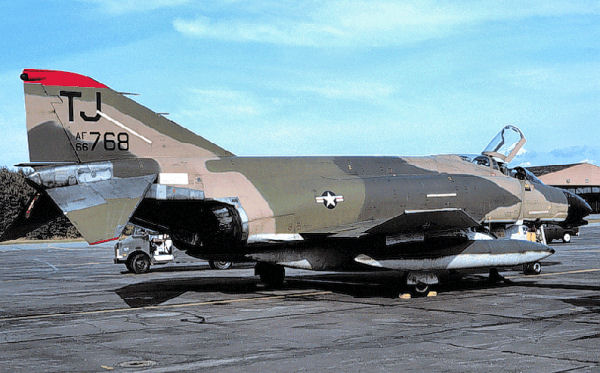
307th Tactical Fighter Squadron F-4D Phantom ii (Note: Aircraft is McDonnell F-4D Phantom II, serial 66-8768. This aircraft is now on permanent display in front of the VFW post in Bastrop, Texas.)

In 1970 the 401st Tactical Fighter Wing (TFW) upgraded to the McDonnell Douglas F-4E Phantom II. In September 1973, an equipment change to the F-4C model took place, then in 1978 to the F-4D.

As a result of the withdrawal of USAF forces in South Vietnam, in 1972 the 307th and 353d fighter squadrons were returned to their home bases, and the 612th and 614th Tactical Fighter Squadrons (TFS) were assigned to Torrejon. Also in 1972, squadron tail codes were eliminated and "TJ" became the tail code for all 401st TFW aircraft.

In 1983 the 401st upgraded to the Block 15 F-16A/B Fighting Falcon. The F-16s were upgraded to the Block 30 F-16C/D in July 1988.

In January 1988 Spain and the United States announced jointly that agreement had been reached in principle on a new base agreement with an initial term of eight years. The agreement essentially met conditions demanded by Spain that the USAF withdraw from a permanent presence on the base. The F-16 aircraft were to be removed from Torrejon by mid-1991. It was expected that this action would reduce the number of United States personnel in Spain by nearly one-half.

Implementation of this agreement was delayed by the 1990/91 crisis in Southwest Asia, when the 401st was one of the first American fighter wings to respond. The 612th Squadron deployed to Incirlik Air Base, Turkey as part of the 7440th Composite Wing (Provisional) (Note: The deployed squadron became the Tactical Fighter Squadron, Provisional, 612th.) and the 614th Squadron deployed to Doha, Qatar where it became the core of the Tactical Fighter Wing, 401st, Provisional, which was formed from the wing's support elements. However, after the 1991 cease-fire in Iraq, plans proceeded to close Torrejon Air Base.

==== Aviano Air Base ====
On 1 October 1991 the wing was redesignated the 401st Fighter Wing. Initially, the USAF decided to return the wing to the US and inactivate it. However, the remaining members of NATO lobbied to keep the 401st in the Southern Region OF NATO and offered to rebase it using NATO funds. In accordance with the 1988 agreement, the USAF portion of the base was returned to the Spanish government on 21 May 1992, and the 401st Fighter Wing transferred on paper to Aviano Air Base Italy without personnel or equipment. At Aviano it assumed the personnel mission and equipment of the 40th Support Wing, which was inactivated.

At Aviano, the 401st had no assigned tactical units, instead it supported rotating squadrons deployed there from other groups. The tenure of the 401st at Aviano AB was brief, as a result of Hurricane Andrew destroying Homestead AFB, Florida in August 1992. The 31st Fighter Wing, formerly at Homestead was transferred to Aviano on 1 April 1994, taking over the assets of the 401st Fighter Wing, which was inactivated.

===== Expeditionary unit =====
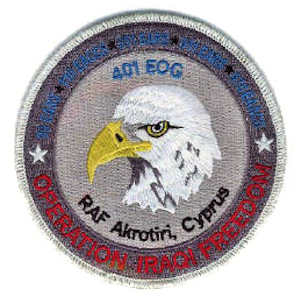
401st Expeditionary Operations Group Morale Patch, Operation Iraqi Freedom

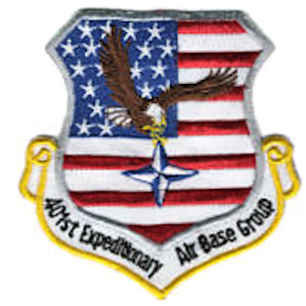
401st Expeditionary Air Base Group Emblem

The 401st Expeditionary Operations Group (401 EOG) was activated in 2001 by USAFE to fly KC-135 air refuelling sorties from RAF Akrotiri, Cyprus. Detachment 1 was located at Tuzla Air Base, Bosnia and Herzegovina, designated as the 401st Expeditionary Air Base Group.

In June 2003 the group moved to Aviano again, where it became the 401st Air Expeditionary Wing, replacing the 16th AEW, inactivating so as to eliminate an overlap in designation and heraldry with the 16th Special Operations Wing at Hurlburt Field, Florida.

USAFE moved the 401st to Ramstein Air Base, Germany in 2008 and it once again became a group. At Ramstein, it has been used as a headquarters for provisional units deployed for humanitarian missions and exercises.

== Lineage ==
401st Fighter-Bomber Group

- Constituted as the 401st Bombardment Group (Heavy) on 20 March 1943

Activated on 1 April 1943

- Redesignated 401st Bombardment Group, Heavy ca. 1 November 1943

Inactivated on 28 August 1945.

- Redesignated 401st Bombardment Group on 27 May 1947

Activated on 26 June 1947
Redesignated 401st Bombardment Group, Medium 27 June 1949
Inactivated on 25 June 1951.

- Redesignated 401st Fighter-Bomber Group on 24 November 1953

Activated on 8 February 1954
Inactivated on 25 September 1957

- Consolidated on 31 January 1984 with 401st Tactical Fighter Wing as the 401st Tactical Fighter Wing

401st Air Expeditionary Group

- Constituted as the 401st Fighter-Bomber Wing on 23 March 1953

Activated on 25 September 1957
Redesignated 401st Tactical Fighter Wing on 1 July 1958

- Consolidated on 31 January 1984 with 401st Fighter-Bomber Group as the 401st Tactical Fighter Wing

Redesignated 401st Fighter Wing on 1 October 1991
Inactivated on 1 April 1994

- Redesignated 401st Air Expeditionary Group and converted to provisional status on 5 February 2001

Activated in 2001

- Redesignated 401st Air Expeditionary Wing on 12 June 2003
- Redesignated 401st Air Expeditionary Group on 9 April 2006

=== Assignments ===
- II Bomber Command, 1 April 1943 – October 1943
- 92d Combat Bombardment Wing, 1 November 1943
- 94th Combat Bombardment Wing, 8 January 1944 – 20 June 1945
- Army Service Forces (for inactivation), 1 August 1945 – 28 August 1945
- 44th Bombardment Wing (later 44th Air Division), 26 June 1947 – 25 June 1951
- Tenth Air Force, 27 June 1949
- Strategic Air Command, 1 May 1951 – 25 June 1951
- 9th Air Force, 8 February 1954 – 25 September 1957 (attached to 366th Fighter-Bomber Wing).
- 834th Air Division, 25 September 1957
- Twelfth Air Force, 1 April 1959 (attached to Air Division Provisional, 4481st, 1 January-30 June 1964)
- 834th Air Division, 1 July 1964
- Sixteenth Air Force, 27 April 1966 – 1 April 1994
- United States Air Forces in Europe to activate or inactivate any time after 5 February 2001

Attached to Sixteenth Air Force, 2001 – 29 November 2006
Attached to Third Air Force, 29 November 2006 – 1 July 2010
Attached to 435th Air Ground Operations Wing, 1 July 2010 – present

=== Components ===
==== Groups ====
- 100th Expeditionary Operations Group, ca. 2003
- 401st Air Base Group (later 401st Combat Support Group, 401st Support Group, 401st Expeditionary Mission Support Group), 1 April 1959 – 1 July 1966; 27 April 1966 – 1 April 1994; 12 January 2003 – 31 May 2006
- 401st Logistics Group, 4 May 1992 – 1 April 1994
- 401st Expeditionary Operations Group, 12 January 2003 – 31 May 2006
- Operations Group, Provisional, 401st, (attached 26 July 1993 – 1 April 1994)
- 401st Regional Support Group, 4 May 1992 – 1 April 1994

==== Operational Squadrons ====
- 90th Tactical Fighter Squadron, (attached c. 5 December 1965 – c. 7 February 1966)
- 307th Tactical Fighter Squadron, 27 April 1966 – 15 July 1971
- 353d Tactical Fighter Squadron, 27 April 1966 – 15 July 1971
- 531st Tactical Fighter Squadron: attached 19 November 1965 – c. 10 December 1965
- 612th Bombardment Squadron (later Fighter-Bomber Squadron, Tactical Fighter Squadron), 1 April 1943 – 28 August 1945; 26 June 1947 – 25 June 1951; 8 February 1954 – 25 September 1957; 25 September 1957 – 3 November 1965; 15 July 1971 – 1 October 1991
- 613th Bombardment Squadron (later Fighter-Bomber Squadron, Tactical Fighter Squadron), 1 April 1943 – 28 August 1945; 26 June 1947 – 25 June 1951; 8 February 1954 – 25 September 1957: 25 September 1957 – 28 June 1991
- 614th Bombardment Squadron (later Fighter-Bomber Squadron, Tactical Fighter Squadron, Fighter Squadron), 1 April 1943 – 28 August 1945; 26 June 1947 – 25 June 1951; 8 February 1954 – 25 September 1957: 25 September 1957 – 27 April 1966; 15 July 1971 – 1 January 1992
- 615th Bombardment Squadron (later Fighter-Bomber Squadron, Tactical Fighter Squadron), 1 April 1943 – 28 August 1945; 26 June 1947 – 25 June 1951; 25 September 1957 – 27 April 1966

==== Support Units ====
- 401st Tactical Hospital (also 401st USAF Hospital), 1 April 1959 – 1 July 1964; 27 April 1966 – 21 May 1992
- USAF Hospital, Torrejon (later 401st Tactical Fighter Wing Hospital, 401st Medical Squadron), 27 April 1966 – 1 April 1994
- 401st Armament & Electronics Maintenance Squadron (later 401st Avionics Maintenance Squadron, 401st Component Repair Squadron), 25 September 1957 – 4 May 1992
- 401st Consolidated Aircraft Maintenance Squadron (later 401st Field Maintenance Squadron, 401st Equipment Maintenance Squadron, 401st Maintenance Squadron), 25 September 1957 – 1 October 1962; 1 October 1962 – 4 May 1992
- 401st Munitions Maintenance Squadron, 15 May 1963 – 30 June 1979
- 401st Operations Support Squadron, 1 May 1992 – 1 April 1994 (attached to Operations Group, Provisional 401 after 26 July 1993)
- 401st Organizational Maintenance Squadron (later 401st Aircraft Generation Squadron), 1 October 1962 – 1 October 1969; 1 February 1972 – 4 May 1992

=== Stations ===
- Ephrata Army Air Base, Washington, 1 April 1943
- Geiger Field, Washington, June 1943
- Great Falls Army Air Base, Montana, July–October 1943
- RAF Deenethorpe (USAAF Station 128), England, C. 1 November 1943 – May 1945
- Sioux Falls Army Air Field, South Dakota, c. 1–28 August 1945
- Brooks Field (later Brooks Air Force Base), Texas, 26 June 1947
- Biggs AFB, Texas, 27 June 1949 – 25 June 1951
- Alexandria Air Force Base (later England Air Force Base), Louisiana, 8 February 1954 – 25 September 1957; 25 September 1957 – 22 April 1966
- Torrejon Air Base, Spain, 27 April 1966
- Aviano Air Base, Italy, 21 May 1992 – 1 April 1994
- RAF Akrotiri, Cyprus, 2001 – ca June 2004
- Aviano Air Base, Italy, circa June 2004 – 4 September 2008
- Ramstein Air Base, Germany, 4 September 2008 – present

=== Aircraft ===
- Boeing B-17G Flying Fortress, 1942–1945
- North American F-86 Sabre, 1954–1955
- Republic F-84F Thunderstreak, 1955–1957; 1957
- North American F-100 Super Sabre, 1957–1970
- McDonnell Douglas F-4 Phantom II, 1970–1983
- General Dynamics F-16 Fighting Falcon, 1983–1992
- Unknown, 2001–2003

=== Awards and campaigns ===
Award streamer	Award	Dates	Notes
	Distinguished Unit Citation	11 January 1944	Germany 401st Bombardment Group
	Distinguished Unit Citation	20 February 1944	Germany 401st Bombardment Group
	Air Force Outstanding Unit Award w/Combat "V" Device	28 August 1990 – 21 March 1991	Tactical Fighter Wing, Provisional, 401st (Note: The Tactical Fighter Wing, Provisional, 401st was the forward deployed element of the wing during Operation Desert Storm.)
	Air Force Outstanding Unit Award	1 January 1963 – 31 December 1963	401st Tactical Fighter Wing
	Air Force Outstanding Unit Award	1 July 1983 – 30 June 1985	401st Tactical Fighter Wing
	Air Force Outstanding Unit Award	1 April 1989 – 31 March 1991	401st Tactical Fighter Wing
	Air Force Outstanding Unit Award	1 April 1992 – 31 March 1994	401st Fighter Wing

Campaign Streamer	Campaign	Dates	Notes
	Air Offensive, Europe		401st Bombardment Group
	Normandy		401st Bombardment Group
	Ardennes-Alsace		401st Bombardment Group
	Northern France		401st Bombardment Group
	Rhineland		401st Bombardment Group
	Central Europe		401st Bombardment Group
