= 615th Tactical Fighter Squadron =

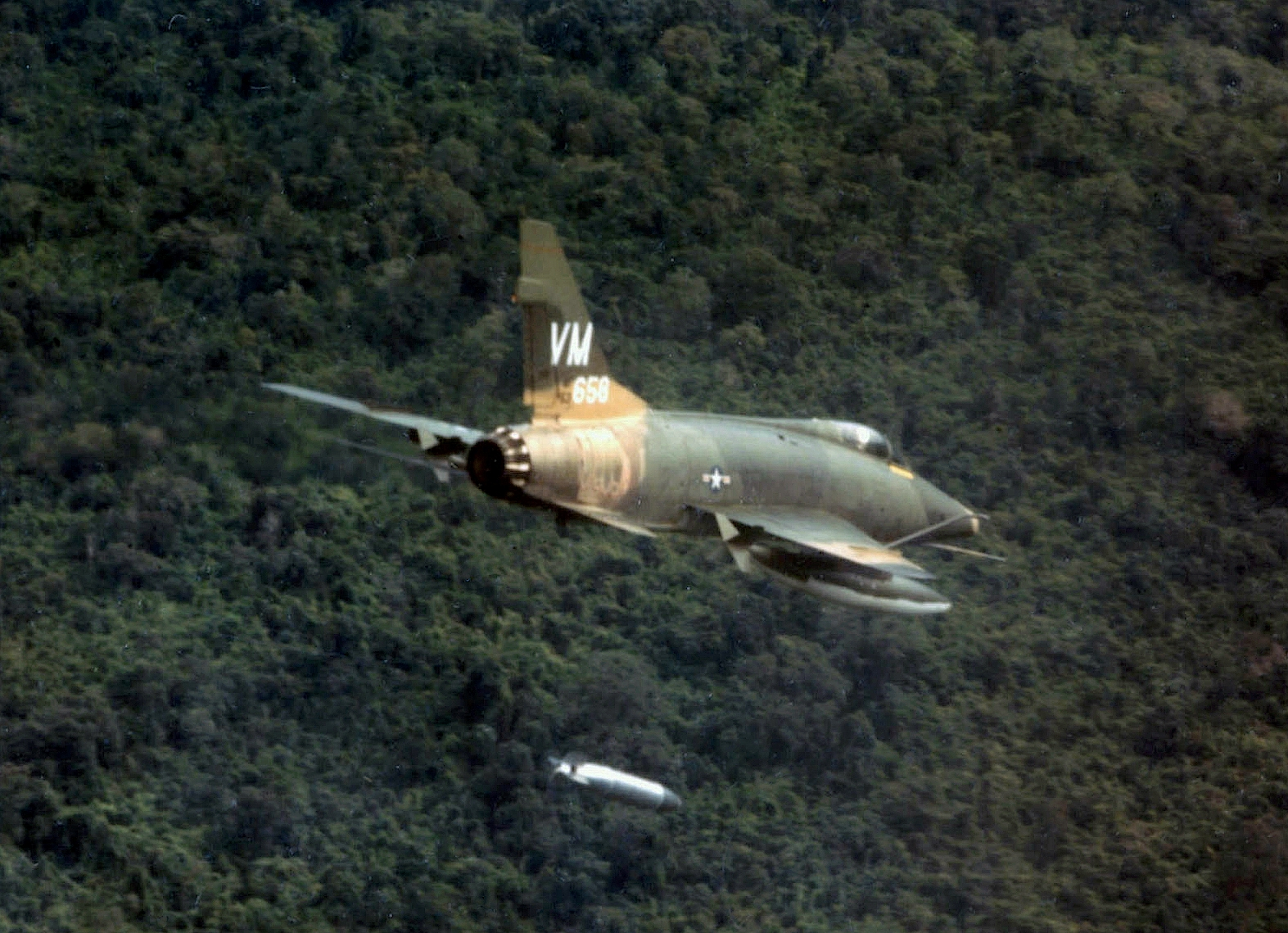
- 35th Wing F-100 Super Sabre dropping napalm (Note: Aircraft is North American F-100D-25-NA Super Sabre, serial 55-3658 attacking a target near Bien Hoa, Vietnam.)
- Active: 1943–1945; 1947–1949; 1957–1971
- Country: United States
- Branch: United States Air Force
- Role: Tactical fighter
- Motto: Press on
- Engagements: European Theater of Operations; Vietnam War
- Decorations: Distinguished Unit Citation; Air Force Outstanding Unit Award

Insignia
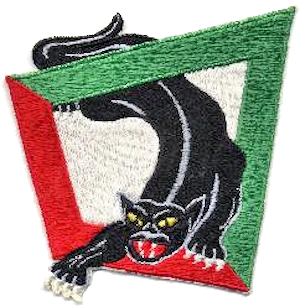
- Patch with 615th Tactical Fighter Squadron emblem (Note: Approved 17 November 1958. Description: A gray quadrangle within a wide border per bend green and red; a ferocious stalking black leopard, highlighted gray, issuing from chief and extending over the border in base, his eyes green, teeth white and tongue red, his tail appearing above the border in chief.)

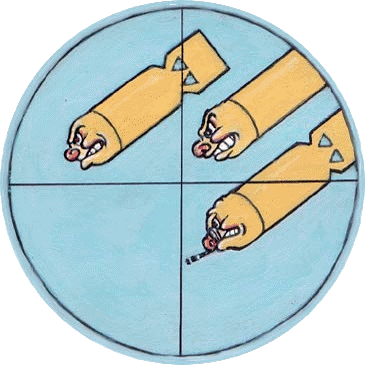
- 615th Bombardment Squadron emblem (Note: The emblem was designed by Milton Caniff. The three bombs represent Roosevelt, Stalin, and Churchill. Closway, p. 5.)
- World War II Fuselage Code: IY

The 615th Tactical Fighter Squadron is an inactive United States Air Force unit. It was last assigned to the 35th Tactical Fighter Wing at Phan Rang Air Base, South Vietnam, where it was inactivated on 15 July 1971.

The squadron was first activated during World War II as the 615th Bombardment Squadron. After training in the United States it moved to England, where it participated in the strategic bombing campaign against Germany. It earned two Distinguished Unit Citations for combat action. Following V-E Day, the squadron was inactivated in England. It was briefly active in the reserves from 1947 to 1949.

The squadron was reactivated as the 615th Fighter-Bomber Squadron in 1957, when the 401st Fighter-Bomber Wing expanded from three to four squadrons. In 1966, the squadron moved to Phan Rang Air Base, Vietnam, engaging in combat operations until inactivating in 1971 as the United States withdrew its forces from South Vietnam.

== History ==
=== World War II ===
==== Organization and training for combat ====
The 615th Bombardment Squadron was activated March 1943 at Ephrata Army Air Base Washington as one of the original squadrons of the 401st Bombardment Group. The initial cadre for the squadron was drawn from the 395th Bombardment Group at Ephrata and the 383d Bombardment Group at Rapid City Army Air Field, South Dakota. The cadre soon departed for Orlando Army Air Base, Florida, where they conducted simulated combat missions with the Army Air Forces School of Applied Tactics from Brooksville Army Air Field.

The ground echelon moved to Geiger Field, Washington in May 1943 and to Great Falls Army Air Base, Montana in July. At Great Falls the first combat crews were assigned to the squadron. In the final stage of training the squadrons dispersed with the 615th training at Lewiston Army Air Field.

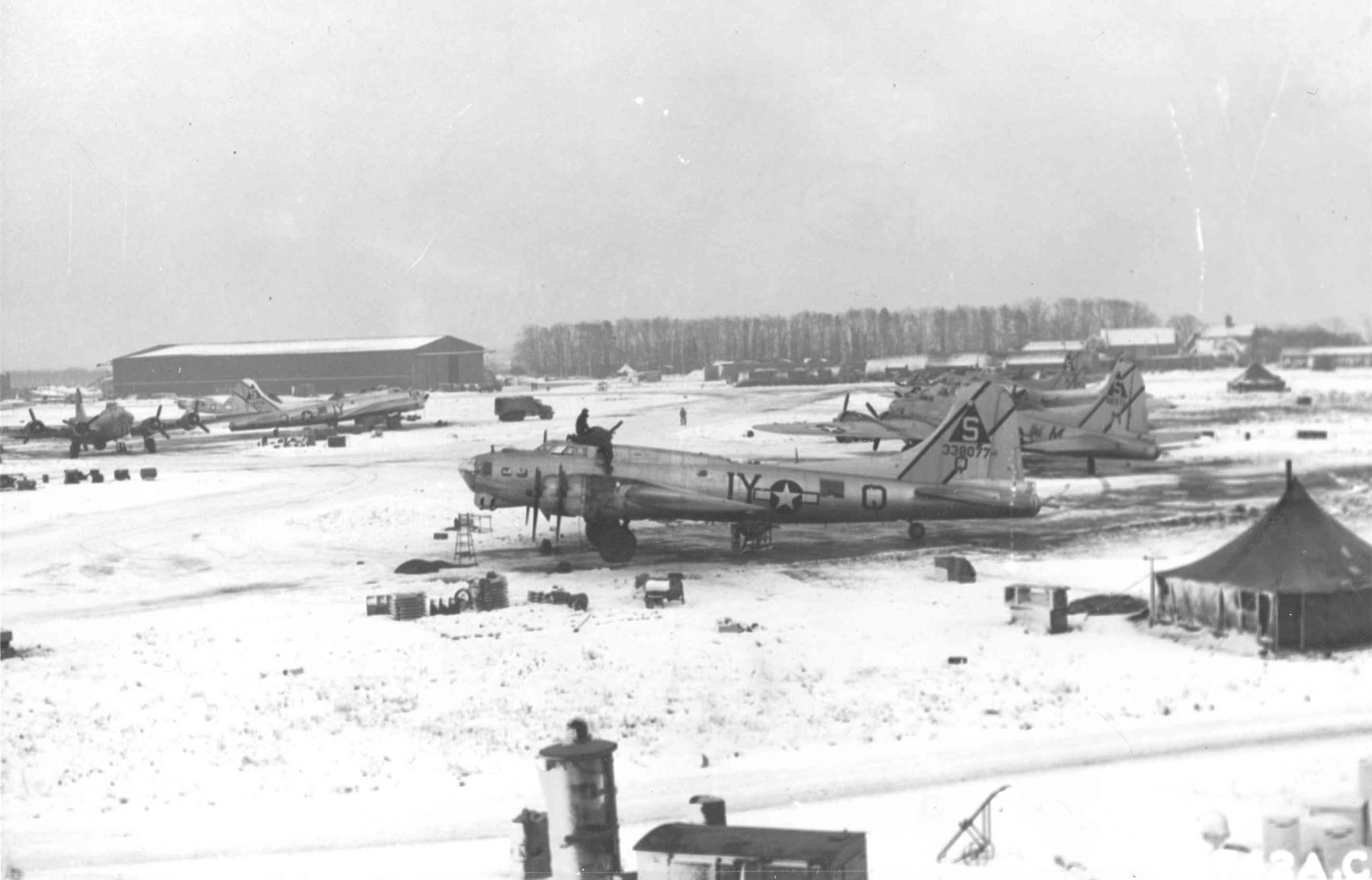
B-17s of the 615th Bomb Squadron at Deenethorpe. (Note: Aircraft in foreground is Boeing B-17G-80-BO Flying Fortress, serial 43-38077, Duke's Mixture/Tag A Long, fuselage code IW-H. this plane survived the war and was put into storage on 26 November 1945. It was sold for scrap in July 1946. Baugher, Joe (30 April 2023). "1943 USAF Serial Numbers". Joe Baugher.)

After completing training the ground echelon left for overseas on 19 October 1943. After staging at Camp Shanks, New York they embarked on the RMS Queen Mary and sailed on 27 October disembarking at Greenock on the Firth of Clyde on 3 November 1943. The air echelon staged for deployment at Scott Field, Illinois then flew to England under the control of Air Transport Command via Newfoundland, Iceland and Scotland.

==== Combat in the European Theater ====
On arrival in England, half of the 401st Group's aircrews were immediately reassigned to the 351st Bombardment Group. The rest of the squadron became part of Eighth Air Force at RAF Deenethorpe. The 615th became part of the 92d Combat Bombardment Wing of the 1st Bombardment Division. The group's tail code was Triangle-S.

On 26 November the 615th flew its first combat mission against Bremen, Germany. The 401st Group did not suffer the combat loss of an airplane until its ninth mission on 30 December. The squadron operated chiefly against strategic targets, bombing industries, submarine facilities, shipyards, missile sites, marshalling yards, and airfields. On 11 January 1944 the squadron was in the lead group of the 1st Bombardment Division in an attack against aircraft manufacturing facilities at Oschersleben, Germany. Although the bombers were able to attack, poor weather conditions prevented the division from receiving effective fighter cover. For over three hours the bomber formation suffered more than 400 attacks by Luftwaffe fighters, including air-to-air rocket attacks. Despite these attacks the unit continued its attack and struck a telling blow against German aircraft production for which the squadron was awarded a Distinguished Unit Citation (DUC).

A little over a month later, on 20 February, the squadron earned its second DUC for an attack on the Erla Maschinenwerke aircraft manufacturing facilities in Leipzig, Germany. Despite fighter attacks and battle damage to the group's planes, 100% of the unit's bombs fell within 1000 feet of the aiming point. Beginning in October 1944, the unit concentrated its attacks on Axis oil reserves.

In addition to strategic missions, squadron operations included attacks on transportation, airfields, and fortifications prior to Operation Overlord, the Normandy invasion. On D-Day the 615th attacked Normandy beachhead areas dropping bombs five minutes before troops landed. The following month it provided close air support for Operation Cobra, the breakthrough at Saint-Lô, it also supported the siege of Brest in August and Operation Market Garden in September. During the Battle of the Bulge in December 1944 and January 1945, the unit attacked transportation and communications in the battle area. It supported airborne forces involved in Operation Varsity, the airborne assault across the Rhine in March 1945.

The squadron flew its last combat mission on 20 April 1945 against Brandenberg. It had flown 254 combat missions from Deenethorpe airfield. After V-E Day, the squadron flew missions to Linz, Austria to evacuate British and French prisoners of war. It also flew "Trolley" sightseeing missions at low level, flying ground support personnel over the Ruhr and Frankfurt am Main to see the damage that had been done as a result of their efforts.

The unit was alerted for redeployment to the Pacific Theater and the last plane departed Deenethorpe in early June. The ground echelon sailed on the RMS Queen Elizabeth on the fifth. Upon arrival in the US, personnel were granted thirty days leave, reassembling at Sioux Falls Army Air Field, South Dakota, but plans had changed and personnel were either transferred to Boeing B-29 Superfortress units or processed for discharge and the group was inactivated.

=== Reserve operations ===
The squadron was activated at Brooks Field (later Brooks Air Force Base), Texas in June 1947 as a unit of the reserves. It trained under the supervision of the 178th AAF Base Unit (later 2593d Air Force Reserve Training Center) of Air Defense Command (ADC). It is not clear whether or not the squadron was fully staffed or equipped. In 1948, Continental Air Command assumed responsibility for managing reserve and Air National Guard units from ADC. President Truman's reduced 1949 defense budget required reductions in the number of units in the Air Force, and the 615th was inactivated in June.

=== Fighter operations ===
==== Tactical Air Command ====
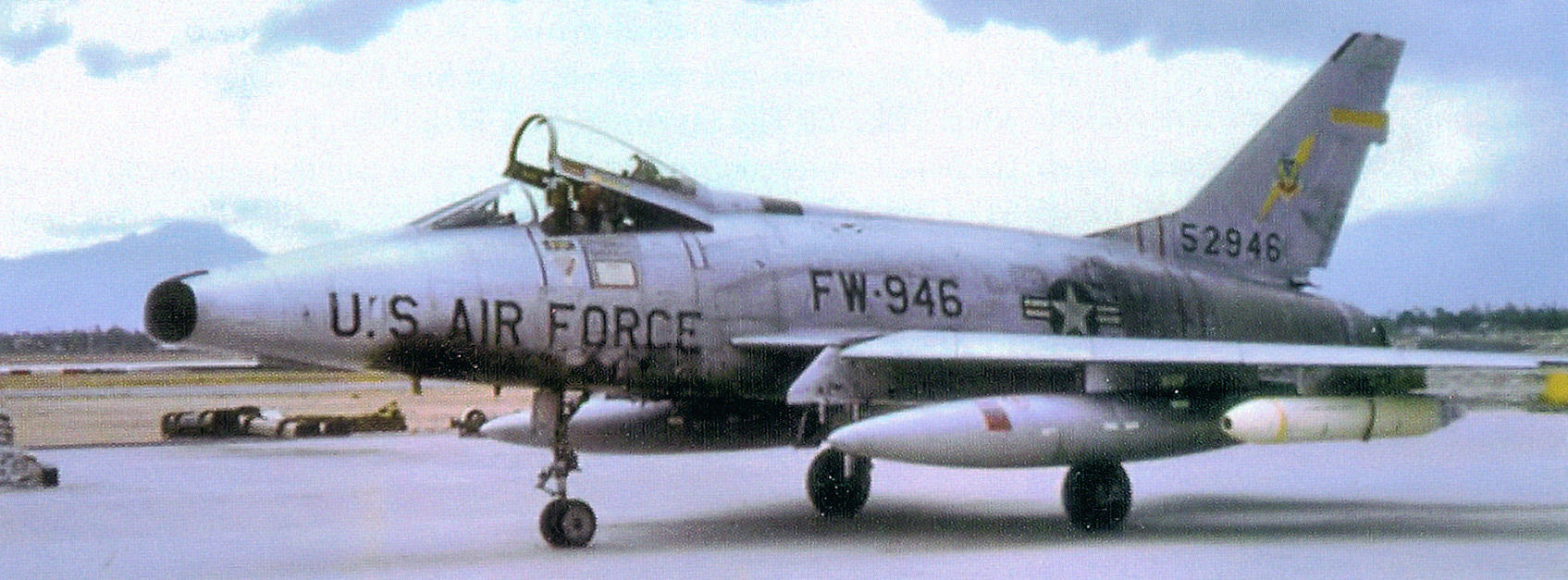
Squadron F-100D Super Sabre (Note: Aircraft is North American F-100D-45-NH Super Sabre, serial 55-2946. Taken in July 1965. This plane crashed near Torrejon Air Base on 16 May 1967. Baugher, Joe (21 April 2023). "1955 USAF Serial Numbers". Joe Baugher.)

The squadron was redesignated the 615th Fighter-Bomber Squadron and assigned to the 401st Fighter-Bomber Wing at England Air Force Base, Louisiana in September 1957 as the 401st Wing expanded from three to four squadrons of North American F-100 Super Sabres. The squadron became the 615th Tactical Fighter Squadron a few months later. It participated in firepower demonstrations military exercises and maneuvers, It also deployed aircraft and personnel to Europe and the Middle East to support NATO. During the Cuban Missile Crisis, the squadron operated from Homestead Air Force Base, Florida. By 1965, however, deployments had begun to the Pacific and Southeast Asia.

==== Combat in Southeast Asia ====
In the spring of 1966, the squadron's parent wing moved to Torrejon Air Base, Spain, but the squadron remained at England Air Force Base until July, when it moved to Phan Rang Air Base, Republic of Vietnam and was assigned to the 366th Tactical Fighter Wing. Shortly after the squadron's arrival at Phan Rang, the 366th Wing moved on paper to Da Nang Air Base, and the 35th Tactical Fighter Wing became the squadron's new headquarters. The squadron continued combat operations in Vietnam until the 35th Wing stood down from combat on 26 June 1971. The squadron was inactivated the following month.

== Lineage ==
- Constituted as the 615th Bombardment Squadron (Heavy) on 20 March 1943

Activated on 1 April 1943
Redesignated 615th Bombardment Squadron, Heavy c. 1 November 1943
Inactivated on 28 August 1945

- Redesignated 615th Bombardment Squadron, Very Heavy on 27 December 1946

Activated in the reserve on 10 January 1947
Inactivated on 27 June 1949

- Redesignated 615th Fighter-Bomber Squadron on 30 August 1957

Activated on 25 September 1957
Redesignated 615th Tactical Fighter Squadron on 1 July 1958
Inactivated on 31 July 1971

=== Assignments ===
- 401st Bombardment Group, 1 April 1943 – 28 August 1945
- Tenth Air Force, 10 January 1947
- 401st Bombardment Group, 30 September 1947 – 27 June 1949.
- 401st Fighter-Bomber Wing (later Tactical Fighter Wing), 25 September 1957
- 834th Air Division, 27 April 1966
- 366th Tactical Fighter Wing, 16 July 1966
- 35th Tactical Fighter Wing, 10 October 1966 – 31 July 1971

=== Stations ===
- Ephrata Army Air Base, Washington, 1 April 1943
- Geiger Field, Washington, 4 June 1943
- Great Falls Army Air Base, Montana, 8 July 1943 – 19 October 1943 (deployed to Lewiston AAF after August)
- RAF Deenethorpe (AAF-128), England, 4 November 1943 – 20 June 1945
- Sioux Falls Army Air Field, South Dakota c. 1–28 August 1945
- Brooks Field (later Brooks Air Force Base), Texas, 26 June 1947 – 27 June 1949
- England Air Force Base, Louisiana, 25 September 1957
- Phan Rang Air Base, Republic of Vietnam, 16 July 1966 – 31 July 1971

=== Aircraft ===
- Boeing B-17 Flying Fortress, 1943–1945
- North American F-100 Super Sabre, 1957–1971

=== Awards and campaigns ===
Award streamer	Award	Dates	Notes
	Distinguished Unit Citation	11 January 1944	Germany 615th Bombardment Squadron
	Distinguished Unit Citation	20 February 1944	Germany 615th Bombardment Squadron
	Presidential Unit Citation	10 Oct 1966 - 10 April 1967	615th Tactical Fighter Squadron
	Air Force Outstanding Unit Award with Combat "V" Device	1 April 1966- 30 September 1966	615th Tactical Fighter Squadron
	Air Force Outstanding Unit Award with Combat "V" Device	3 September 1967 - 2 May 1968	615th Tactical Fighter Squadron
	Air Force Outstanding Unit Award with Combat "V" Device	1 October 1968 - 13 April 1969	615th Tactical Fighter Squadron
	Air Force Outstanding Unit Award with Combat "V" Device	14 April 1969 - 13 April 1970	615th Tactical Fighter Squadron
	Air Force Outstanding Unit Award with Combat "V" Device	1 December 1970 - 25 June 1971	615th Tactical Fighter Squadron
	Air Force Outstanding Unit Award	1 January 1963 - 31 December 1963	615th Tactical Fighter Squadron
	Air Force Outstanding Unit Award	10 March 1965 - 31 March 1965	615th Tactical Fighter Squadron
	Air Force Outstanding Unit Award	19 March 1965 - 20 June 1965	615th Tactical Fighter Squadron
	Vietnamese Gallantry Cross with Palm	1 April 1966 - 31 July 1968	615th Tactical Fighter Squadron
	Vietnamese Gallantry Cross with Palm	1 September 1968 - 9 October 1970	615th Tactical Fighter Squadron
	Vietnamese Gallantry Cross with Palm	24 February 1971 - 30 March 1971	615th Tactical Fighter Squadron

Campaign Streamer	Campaign	Dates	Notes
	Air Offensive, Europe	4 November 1943 – 5 June 1944	615th Bombardment Squadron
	Normandy	6 June 1944 – 24 July 1944	615th Bombardment Squadron
	Ardennes-Alsace	16 December 1944 – 25 January 1945	615th Bombardment Squadron
	Northern France	25 July 1944 – 14 September 1944	615th Bombardment Squadron
	Rhineland	15 September 1944 – 21 March 1945	615th Bombardment Squadron
	Central Europe	2 March 1944 – 21 May 1945	615th Bombardment Squadron
	Vietnam Air Offensive	16 July 1966 – 8 March 1967	615th Tactical Fighter Squadron
	Vietnam Air Offensive, Phase II	9 March 1967 – 31 March 1968	615th Tactical Fighter Squadron
	Vietnam Air/Ground	22 January 1968 – 7 July 1968	615th Tactical Fighter Squadron
	Vietnam Air Offensive, Phase III	1 April 1968 – 31 October 1968	615th Tactical Fighter Squadron
	Vietnam Air Offensive, Phase IV	1 November 1968 – 22 February 1969	615th Tactical Fighter Squadron
	Tet 1969/Counteroffensive	23 February 1969 – 8 June 1969	615th Tactical Fighter Squadron
	Vietnam Summer-Fall 1969	9 June 1969 – 31 October 1969	615th Tactical Fighter Squadron
	Vietnam Winter-Spring 1970	3 November 1969 – 30 April 1970	615th Tactical Fighter Squadron
	Sanctuary Counteroffensive	1 May 1970 – 30 June 1970	615th Tactical Fighter Squadron
	Southwest Monsoon	1 July 1970 – 30 November 1970	615th Tactical Fighter Squadron
	Commando Hunt V	1 December 1970 – 14 May 1971	615th Tactical Fighter Squadron
	Commando Hunt VI	15 May 1971 – 15 July 1971	615th Tactical Fighter Squadron

== See also ==
- List of United States Air Force fighter squadrons
- List of F-100 units of the United States Air Force
- B-17 Flying Fortress units of the United States Army Air Forces
