= Kenneth North =

United States Air Force general

Kenneth W. North
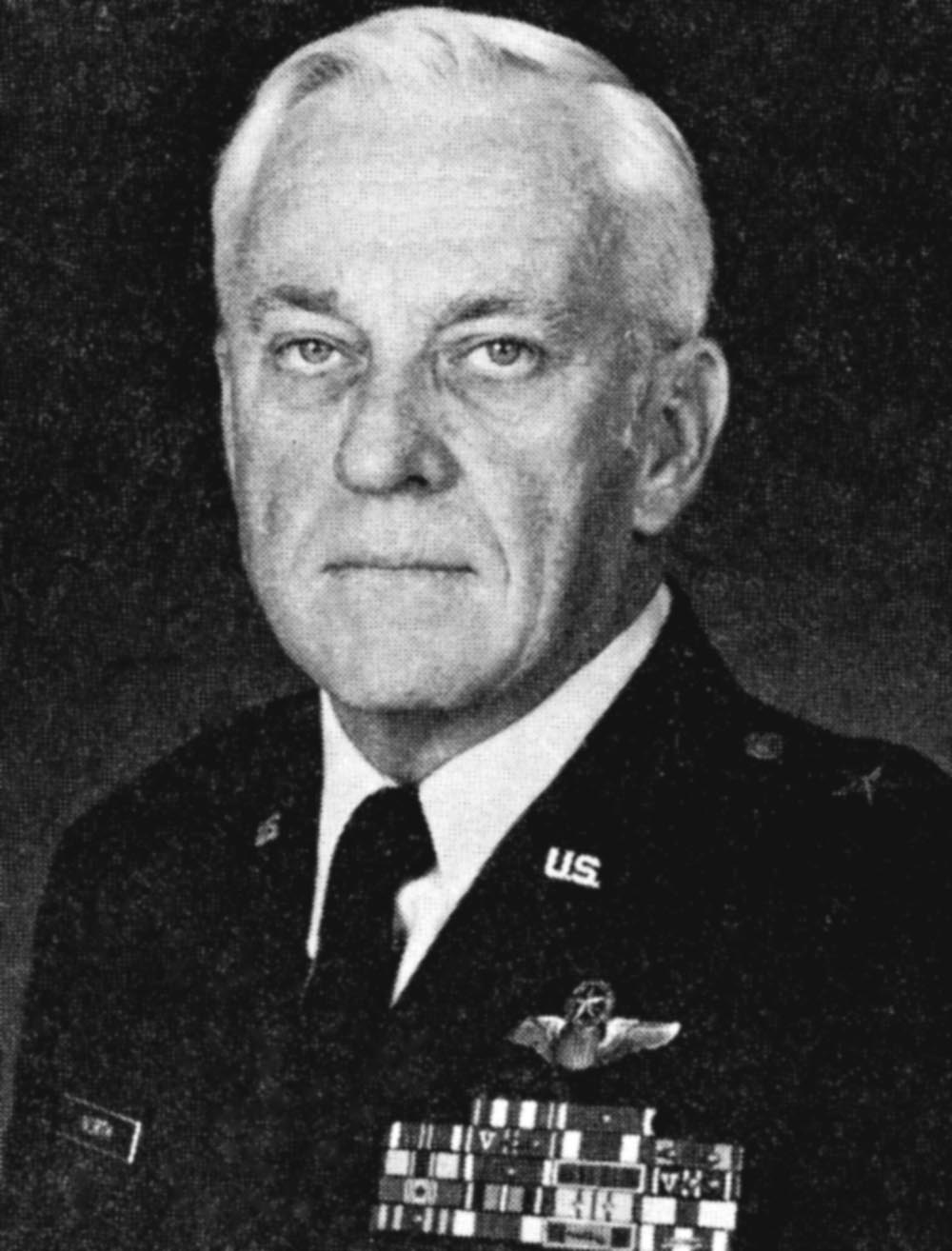
- Born: May 29, 1930; Rockville, Connecticut
- Died: September 21, 2010 (aged 80); Wellfleet, Massachusetts
- Burial place: Wellfleet, Massachusetts
- Military career
- Allegiance: United States
- Branch: United States Air Force
- Service years: 1953–1985
- Rank: Brigadier general
- Commands: 401st Tactical Fighter Wing; 21st North American Aerospace Defense Command Region; 21st Air Division
- Conflicts: Cold War; Vietnam War

Kenneth Walter North (May 29, 1930 – September 21, 2010) was a brigadier general in the United States Air Force as well as a prisoner of war during the Vietnam War. After his release, he commanded various units and was eventually promoted to general in 1982.

== Biography ==
=== Early life ===
North was born on May 29, 1930, in Rockville, Connecticut. After graduating from high school in 1949, he attended the University of Connecticut. He earned a Bachelor of Science degree in 1953.

=== Military career ===
Upon graduation from the University of Connecticut, he was commissioned a second lieutenant in the United States Air Force through the Reserve Officers' Training Corps program and was awarded his pilot wings in September 1954. Following pilot training North served with the Air Defense Command at Truax Field, Wisconsin, until September 1956. From there he was assigned to Itazuke Air Base, Japan, as an F-100 Super Sabre pilot. In January 1961 he joined the 481st Tactical Fighter Squadron at Cannon Air Force Base, New Mexico, as a flight commander and later served as squadron operations officer.

=== Vietnam ===
He was assigned to headquarters, Pacific Air Forces, Hickam Air Force Base, Hawaii, in May 1963 with the Command and Control Division. In October 1965 North joined the 44th Tactical Fighter Squadron at Kadena Air Base, Japan, as an F-105 Thunderchief flight commander. The unit was redesignated the 13th Tactical Fighter Squadron and transferred to Korat Royal Thai Air Force Base, Thailand, in June 1966. North flew 33 combat missions over North Vietnam before his F-105D was downed by enemy fire in August 1966. From then until his release in January 1973, North was a prisoner of war in Hanoi, North Vietnam.

=== Later career ===
Following his return to the United States, he entered the Naval War College, graduating in May 1974. He was then assigned to the 1st Tactical Fighter Wing at MacDill Air Force Base, Florida, as assistant director of operations. From February 1976 to May 1978, he served with the 388th Tactical Fighter Wing at Hill Air Force Base, Utah, first as deputy commander for operations and then as wing vice commander.

In August 1978 North joined the 401st Tactical Fighter Wing, Torrejon Air Base, Spain, as vice commander and, in June 1979, he took command of the wing. From June 1981 to August 1982, he served as executive officer to the deputy commander in chief at Headquarters United States European Command, Stuttgart, Germany. North then moved to Hancock Field, New York, as commander of the 21st North American Aerospace Defense Command Region and the 21st Air Division. He assumed command of the 24th North American Aerospace Defense Command Region at Griffiss Air Force Base, New York, and the 24th Air Division in September 1983.

=== Retirement and death ===
He retired on October 1, 1985. He died on September 21, 2010, of complications from Alzheimer's disease.

== Awards ==
North was a command pilot with more than 3,000 flying hours in tactical fighter aircraft. His military decorations and awards include the Silver Star, Defense Superior Service Medal, Legion of Merit with oak leaf cluster, Distinguished Flying Cross, Bronze Star Medal with "V" device and two oak leaf clusters, Meritorious Service Medal, Air Medal with two oak leaf clusters, Air Force Commendation Medal, Purple Heart with oak leaf cluster and several unit citations.
