= Phan Rang Air Base =

Airbase in Vietnam

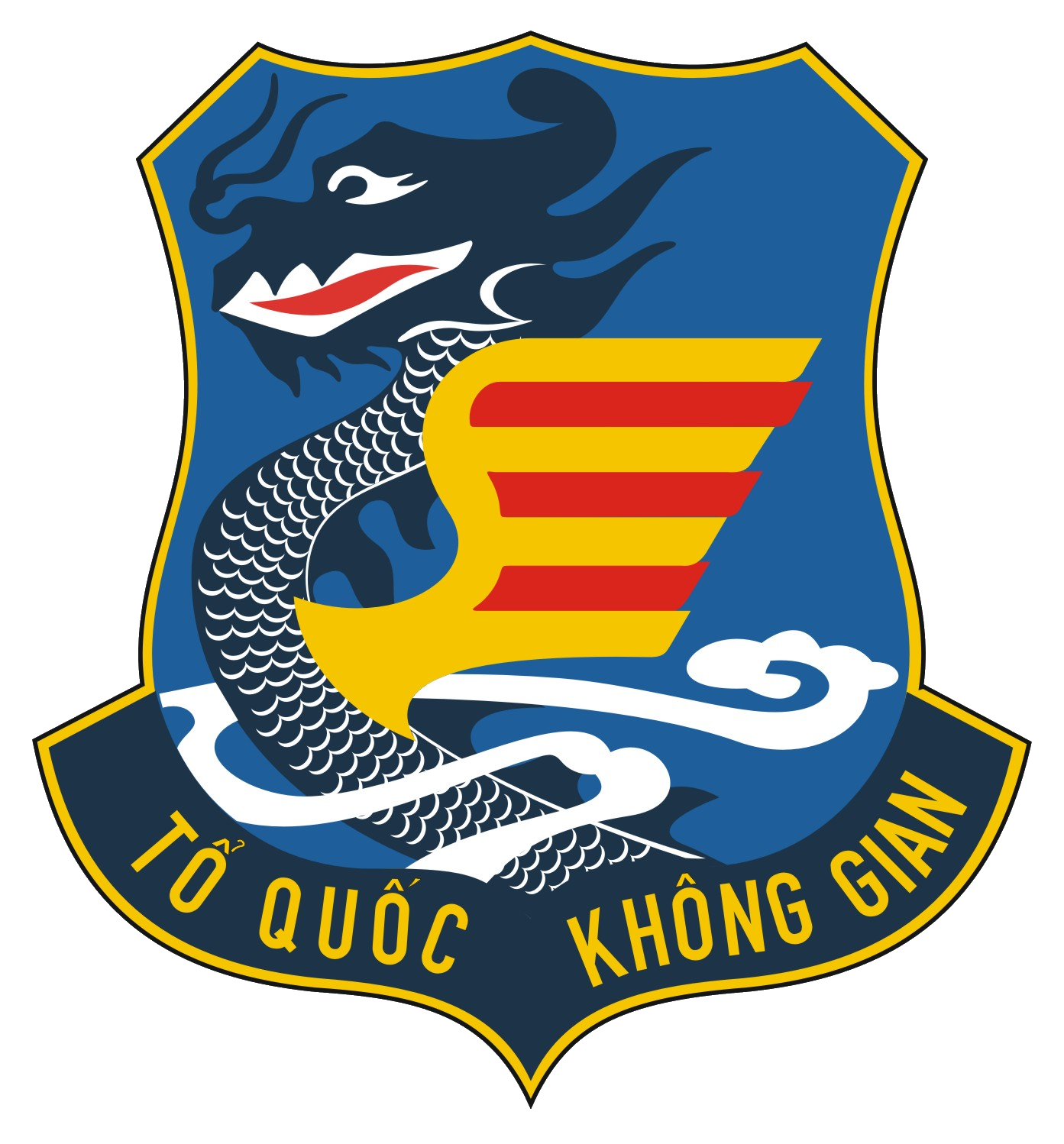
Phan Rang Air Base
- Part of Vietnam Air Defence - Air Force (VADAF); Republic of Vietnam Air Force (RVNAF); Pacific Air Forces (USAF)
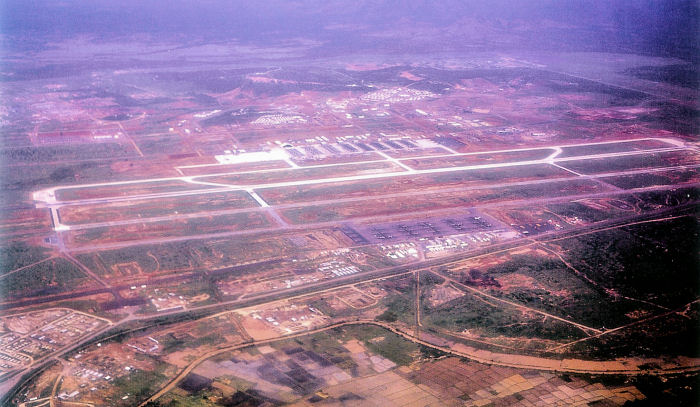
- Phan Rang Air Base, South Vietnam 1967

Site information
- Type: Air Force Base
- Operator: Vietnam Air Defence - Air Force (VADAF)
- Controlled by: Vietnam People's Air Force Republic of Vietnam Air Force United States Air Force
- Condition: Seized 1975 by PAVN, in use as military airfield

Location
- Location within Vietnam
- Coordinates: 11°38′06″N 108°57′01″E

Site history
- Built: 1942 (rebuilt 1965)
- In use: 1942–1954; 1965–present
- Battles/wars: Vietnam War

Garrison information
- Garrison: 937th Fighter Regiment (VADAF); 92d Tactical Wing (RVNAF); 366th Tactical Fighter Wing (USAF); 35th Tactical Fighter Wing (USAF); 315th Tactical Airlift Wing (USAF); 14th Special Operations Wing (USAF)

Airfield information
- IATA: PHA; ICAO: VVPR

Summary
- Elevation AMSL: 32 m (105 ft)
- Coordinates: 11°38′01″N 108°57′07″E
- Interactive map of Airfield information

Runways
Direction	Length		Surface
Direction	m	ft	Surface
~~04L/22R~~ (04/22)	3,200	10,499	Concrete
~~04L/22C~~	3,200	10,499	Currently Disused
~~04L/22L~~	3,200	10,499	Currently Disused

Phan Rang Air Base (also called Thành Sơn Air Base) is a Vietnam Air Defence - Air Force (VADAF) (Khong Quan Nhan Dan Viet Nam) military airfield in Vietnam. It is located 5.2 miles (4.5 nmi; 8.4 km) north-northwest of Phan Rang – Tháp Chàm in Khánh Hòa province.

Initially built by the Imperial Japanese Army about 1942, the airfield was also used by the French Air Force (French: Armée de l'Air) during the First Indochina War then abandoned in 1954. The United States rebuilt the airfield in 1965 and it was used by the Republic of Vietnam Air Force (RVNAF) and the United States Air Force during the Vietnam War in the II Corps Tactical Zone of South Vietnam.

It was seized by the People's Army of Vietnam (PAVN) in April 1975 and has been in use by the VADAF ever since.

== Origins ==
The airfield at Phan Rang was used by the Japanese during World War II. In the late 1940s and early 1950s the French Air Force used the same 3,500-foot (1,100 m) runway, and abandoned the facility when French control over Indochina ended in 1954.

== USAF use during the Vietnam War ==
=== 1965-6 Reconstruction ===
In April 1965 CINCPAC instructed an engineering survey for a new airfield at Phan Rang. In July 1965 it was planned that 3 fighter squadrons would be deployed to Phan Rang Air Base once it was completed in October.

In late-August 1965 the newly arrived US Army 62nd Engineer Battalion (Construction) was ordered to build a jet-capable airfield at Phan Rang. Commencing construction in September the Army Engineers built a 10,000-foot (3,000 m) AM-2 aluminum matting runway and open aircraft revetments. Bad weather and shortages of concrete, piping and aluminum matting delayed the base construction, with the completion date progressively delayed to December 1965 and then April 1966. With the movement of the 1st Brigade, 101st Airborne Division to Phan Rang to provide security for base construction, the 62nd Engineer Battalion was also required to construct a base for the 1st Brigade. While the 62nd Engineers constructed the temporary runway, American construction consortium RMK-BRJ was working on a permanent 10,000-foot (3,000 m) concrete runway, taxiways and parking areas. In January 1966 the USAF 554th RED HORSE Squadron arrived at the base to assist with construction.

The temporary aluminum runway became operational on 20 February and by mid-March all the interim facilities were operational. Heavy rain in May 1966 and rushed construction led to damage to the aluminum runway and taxiways and in June the 62nd Engineers rebuilt the taxiways while the 554th RED HORSE and RMK-BRJ rebuilt the runway, reducing its available length to 6,000-foot (1,800 m). The 62nd Engineers also built a 46,000-barrel fuel storage area, a six-inch pipeline to the beach and two 8-inch submarine pipelines from the beach to an offshore floating mooring and discharge facility. On 12 October 1966 RMK-BMJ completed the concrete runway and 4 connecting taxiways. By the end of the year the base was fully completed with powerplant, water and sewage system, operations, accommodation and other structures.

The USAF forces stationed there were under the command of the United States Pacific Air Forces (PACAF) Seventh Air Force. In addition, the United States Navy, and United States Marine Corps had aviation and other support units stationed at Phan Rang.

=== 366th Tactical Fighter Wing ===
Due to the delays in completion of the base, the F-4C Phantom II equipped 391st Tactical Fighter Squadron was diverted from Phan Rang to Cam Ranh Air Base and the 480th Tactical Fighter Squadron went to Da Nang Air Base.

On 14 March 1966 the F-4C equipped 389th Tactical Fighter Squadron arrived at the base becoming the first USAF squadron to deploy there.

On 20 March 1966 the 366th Tactical Fighter Wing was the first permanent USAF organization to be stationed at Phan Rang Air Base. The rain damage to the base in May 1966 delayed the deployment of the 391st Tactical Fighter Squadron from Cam Ranh AB and the 480th TFS from Da Nang AB. The squadrons assigned to the 366th TFW during this period were:

- 352d Tactical Fighter Squadron: from 15 August 1966 (F-100D/F Super Sabre)
- 389th Tactical Fighter Squadron
- Detachment 1, 612th Tactical Fighter Squadron: from 15 May 1966 (F-100)
- 614th Tactical Fighter Squadron: from 18 September 1966 (F-100D/F)
- 615th Tactical Fighter Squadron: from 16 July 1966(F-100D/F)

The US population at the base increased dramatically from 118 in March 1966 to over 4,500 in September 1966. This increase led to pressure on accommodation and maintenance facilities which were still under construction; the growth of prostitution in the "sin strip" outside the base; and an increase in employment of Vietnamese on the base, growing to 1000 by the end of 1966.

On 10 October 1966, the 366th TFW and the 389th Tactical Fighter Squadron moved to Da Nang AB and the 35th Tactical Fighter Wing at Da Nang AB moved to Phan Rang.

=== 35th Tactical Fighter Wing ===
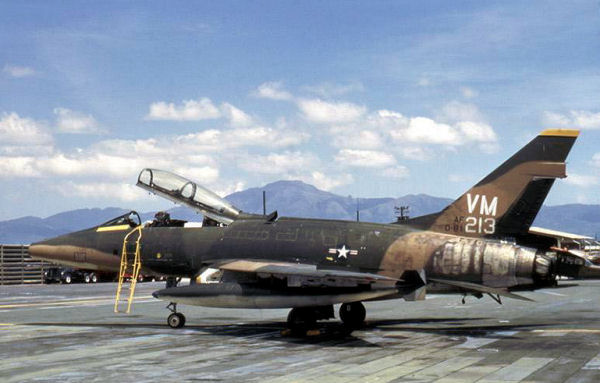
F-100F Super Sabre of the 352d Tactical Fighter Squadron at Phan Rang, 1971

On 10 October 1966 the 35th Tactical Fighter Wing took over as the host unit at Phan Rang.

Units assigned to the 35th TFW were:

- 120th Tactical Fighter Squadron: 30 April 1968 – 18 April 1969 (F-100C/F Tail Code: VS)
- 352d Tactical Fighter Squadron: 10 October 1966 – 31 July 1971 (F-100D/F Tail Code: VM)
- 612th Tactical Fighter Squadron: 10 October 1966 – 8 January 1967 and 14 April 1969 – 15 March 1971 (F-100D/F Tail Code: VS)
- 614th Tactical Fighter Squadron: 10 October 1966 – 31 July 1971 (F-100D/F Tail Code: VP)
- 615th Tactical Fighter Squadron: 10 October 1966 – 31 July 1971 (F-100D/F Tail Code: VZ)

Missions included air support of ground forces, interdiction, visual and armed reconnaissance, strike assessment photography, escort, close and direct air support, and rapid reaction alert. It struck enemy bases and supply caches in the Parrot's Beak just inside the Cambodian border, April–May 1970 and provided close air support and interdiction in support of South Vietnamese operations in Laos and Cambodia, January–June 1971.

==== B-57 Tactical Bombers ====
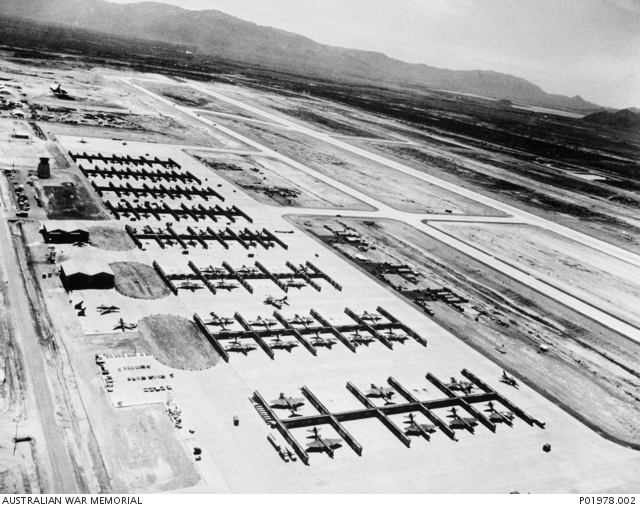
Aircraft revetments at Phan Rang with No. 2 Squadron Canberras in foreground

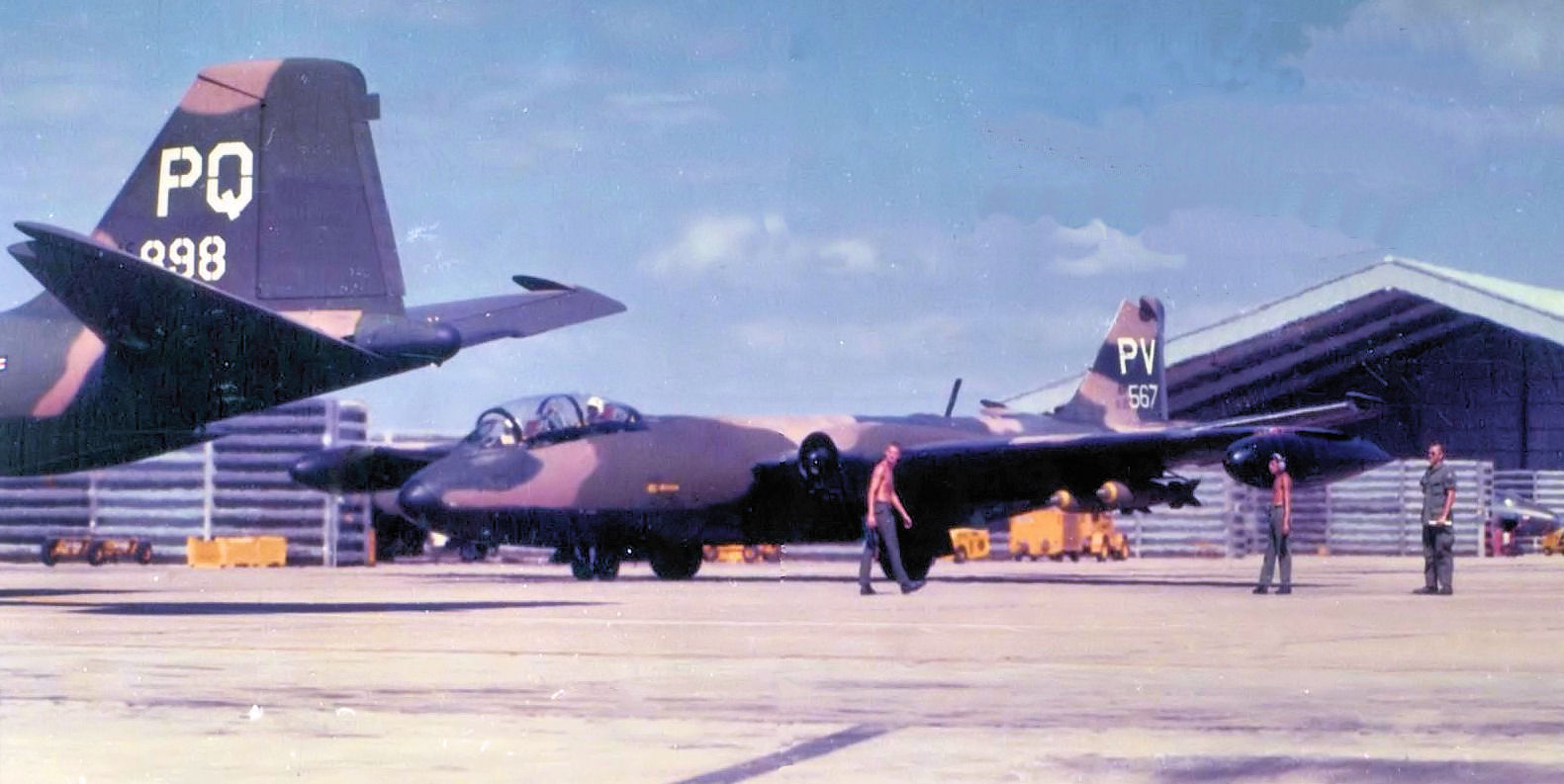
Martin B-57B bombers at Phan Rang, 1968

The B-57 Canberra equipped 8th and 13th Bombardment Squadrons relocated to Phan Rang with the 35th TFW.

B-57 units assigned to the 35th TFWA at Phan Rang were as follows:

- 8th Tactical Bombardment Squadron: 12 October 1966 – 15 November 1969 (B-57B/C/E Tail Code: PQ)
- 13th Tactical Bombardment Squadron: 12 October 1966 – 15 January 1968 (B-57B/C/E Tail Code: PV)
- 2 Squadron, Royal Australian Air Force: 19 April 1967 – 4 June 1971 (Canberra B.20)

On 24 December 1966, 3 Operation Tropic Moon II B-57s, experimentally fitted with a low light level television system carried in a pod underneath the port wing arrived at Phan Rang.

By November 1969 the 8th Bombardment Squadron's strength was down to only 9 aircraft, and it was decided that it was time to retire the B-57B from active service. The surviving aircraft were sent back to the United States in September and October and the 8th Bombardment Squadron was moved to Bien Hoa Air Base and redesignated the 8th Special Operations Squadron.

The RAAF Canberras continued operations from Phan Rang AB until they were withdrawn in June 1971.

==== Further developments, deployments and attacks ====
Detachment 1, 38th Aerospace Rescue and Recovery Squadron equipped with HH-43 Huskies relocated to the base from Nakhon Phanom Royal Thai Air Force Base.

In November 1967 Phan Rang became a forward operating location for 4 AC-47 Spooky gunships of the newly-activated 14th Air Commando Squadron.

On 31 January 1968 at the start of the Tet Offensive, naval gunfire from USS Mansfield was used to deter a VC attack on the base and gunfire from the USS New Jersey later deterred a similar attack.

On 15 April 1968 the 550-man 821st Combat Security Police Squadron was deployed to the base on temporary duty, they were replaced by the 822nd Combat Security Police Squadron in August 1968. The 822nd was replaced by the 823rd Combat Security Police Squadron in March 1969 and was then replaced by the 821st in August 1969. The 821st remained at Phan Rang until February 1971 when it was inactivated.

In mid-September 1968 the Federalized Utah National Guard 116th Engineer Combat Battalion deployed to Phan Rang Air Base to begin a ten-month tour of duty.

Between 10 August 1968 and 31 May 1969, the 554th Civil Engineering Squadron built an armament and electronics shop, fire station, a concrete access taxiway, 6 troop barracks and 2 officers quarters protecting by a revetment wall, a 49,000-square-yard asphalt hardstand, and a base theater.

Commencing in October 1968, USAF engineers built 61 "Wonderarch" aircraft shelters at Phan Rang.

On 26 January 1969 the VC attempted to attack the base. Captain Garth Wright, Security Operations Officer in the 35th Security Police Squadron was later awarded the Air Force Cross for his role in defending the base.

On 3 May 1970 VC sappers attacked the base but were repulsed with minor damage and no Allied casualties. On 10 September VC attacked the main gate but were also repulsed with little damage and no Allied casualties.

=== 315th Air Commando Wing/Special Operations Wing ===
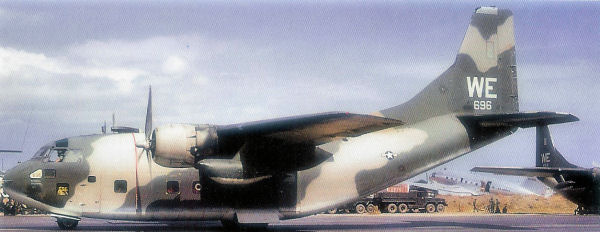
C-123K of the 19th Air Commando Squadron at Phan Rang, April 1968

The 315th Air Commando Wing (Troop Carrier) moved to Phan Rang from Tan Son Nhut Air Base on 15 June 1967 and became a tenant unit supported by the 35th Combat Support Group.Initially designated as the 315th Air Commando Wing, it was redesignated the 315th Special Operations Wing on 1 August 1968. Squadrons assigned were:

- 12th Special Operations Squadron: 15 June 1967 – 30 September 1970 (C-123B/K)
- 19th Special Operations Squadron: 15 June 1967 – 30 June 1971 (C-123B/K Tail Code: WE)
- 309th Special Operations Squadron: 15 June 1967 – 31 July 1970 (C-123B/K Tail Code: WH)
- 310th Special Operations Squadron: 15 June 1967 – 15 January 1972 (C-123B/K Tail Code: WM)
- 311th Special Operations Squadron: 15 June 1967 – 15 October 1971 (C-123B/K Tail Code: WV)

Operations included aerial movement of troops and cargo, flare drops, aeromedical evacuation, and air-drops of critical supplies and paratroops. In 1971–1972 the unit helped to train C-123 aircrews for the RVNAF. The wing was redesignated as the 315th Tactical Airlift Wing on 1 January 1970 and was inactivated on 31 March 1972.

==== Counter-insurgency aircraft ====
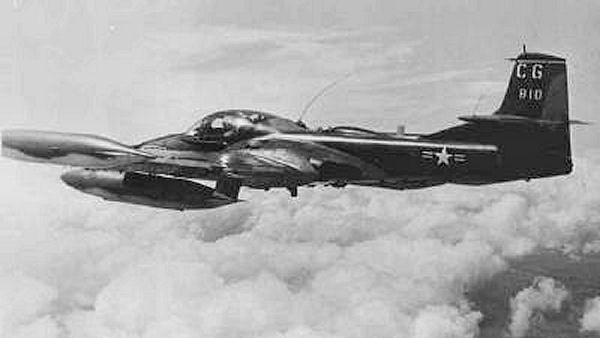
A-37B of the 8th Special Operations Squadron, 1970

In 1971 the 315th TAW expanded its mission with the control of the interdiction and the psychological warfare and visual reconnaissance operations of the following counter-insurgency squadrons:

- 8th Special Operations Squadron: 31 July 1971 – 15 January 1972 (A-37B Dragonfly Tail Code: CG)
- 9th Special Operations Squadron: 30 September 1971 – 29 February 1972 (O-2 Skymaster)

On 15 January 1972, the 8th Special Operations Squadron was reassigned to Bien Hoa AB as part of the USAF drawdown at Phan Rang. The 9th SOS was inactivated on 29 February 1972.

=== 14th Special Operations Wing ===
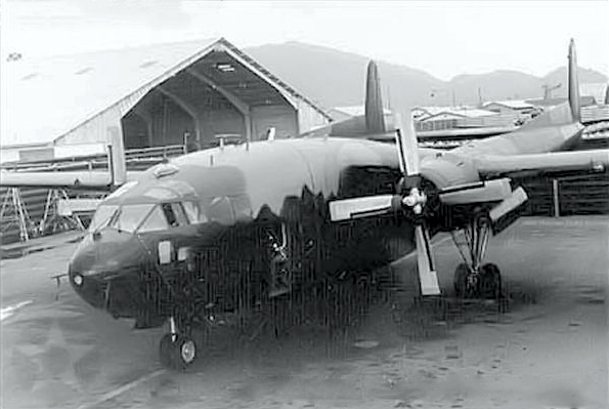
AC-119G "Shadow" gunship of the 17th Special Operations Squadron, 1969

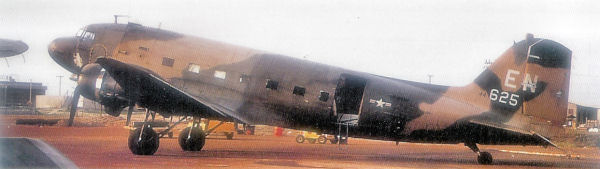
AC-47B "Spooky" gunship of the 4th Special Operations Squadron, March 1969

The 14th Special Operations Wing operated from Phan Rang from 15 October 1969, transferring operational squadrons from Nha Trang Air Base and became a tenant unit supported by the 35th Combat Support Group.

The 14th SOW's operations included close and direct air support, interdiction, unconventional warfare, counter-insurgency operations, psychological warfare (including leaflet dropping and aerial broadcasting) and flare drops. Squadrons assigned were:

- 4th Special Operations Squadron: 15 October 1969 – 15 December 1969 (AC-47D Spooky)
- 9th Special Operations Squadron: 15 October 1969 – 30 September 1971 (C-47)
- 15th Special Operations Squadron: 15 October 1969 – 31 October 1970 (C-130E Combat Talon)
- 17th Special Operations Squadron: 15 October 1969 – 30 September 1971 (AC-119G Shadow)
- 18th Special Operations Squadron: 15 October 1969 – 25 August 1971 (AC-119K Stinger)
- 20th Special Operations Squadron: 15 October 1969 – 1 September 1971 (UH-1P)
- 90th Special Operations Squadron: 31 October 1970 – 1 September 1971 (AC-123K)
- 604th Special Operations Squadron (detached): 15 October 1969 - I March 1970 (A-37A)

Flying from Phan Rang sorties were flown over target areas consisting of the Mekong Delta and the Ho Chi Minh Trail. The aerial gunships destroyed trucks, attacked enemy encampments, ammunition dumps and other ground targets using night vision equipment. It also trained RVNAF personnel in AC-119 operations and maintenance, from February to June 1971. The first crews graduated in April 1971 and with AC-119s transferred to the RVNAF formed the 819th Combat Squadron.

=== USAF withdrawal ===
The 35th TFW was inactivated on 31 July 1971 as part of the general drawdown of United States forces in South Vietnam with the wing's remaining resources passing to the 315th Tactical Airlift Wing. The 352d TFS and the 615th TFS were inactivated in place along with the 35th TFW, standing down from operations on 26 June 1971. The 612th TFS and 614th TFS were inactivated in place on 31 July 1971.

The 315th TAW inactivated in place on 30 September 1971 as part of the US withdrawal from South Vietnam, and jurisdiction of Phan Rang Air Base was turned over to the South Vietnamese.

== RVNAF use of Phan Rang Air Base ==
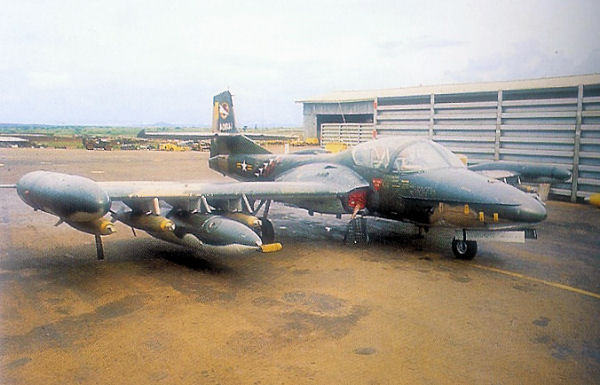
A-37B of the RVNAF 548th Fighter Squadron

The base was progressively handed over to the RVNAF in March–May 1972. After the American withdrawal the RVNAF 92d Tactical Wing at Nha Trang AB moved to Phan Rang Air, operating A-37s and UH-1 helicopters.

In addition to the operational missions, the RVNAF 920th Training Squadron operated T-37Bs for initial jet training for its aviation cadets. American policy in Vietnam after 1970 was aimed at self-sufficiency for the RVNAF so the South Vietnamese could maintain the level of security that had been won jointly by the United States and South Vietnam. The United States would continue to provide material support for the defense of South Vietnam, but it was expected that the RVNAF would have the capability to use United States equipment effectively. If that capability could be developed, the RVNAF would be judged self-sufficient.

However, this training had to be halted in June 1974 for lack of logistic support and financial reasons due to United States aid reduction.

Units at Phan Rang Air Base were under the command of the RVNAF 2d Air Division at Nha Trang AB.

92d Tactical Wing

- 524th/534th/548th Fighter Squadron A-37
- Det D 259th Helicopter Squadron UH-1H (Medevac)

On 15 September 1974 a hijacker took control of an Air Vietnam Boeing 727-121C on a flight from Da Nang to Saigon and demanded to be flown to Hanoi. The crew attempted to land at the base, overshot the landing and then crashed while turning to make another approach killing all 75 onboard.

=== Capture of Phan Rang Air Base ===
Following the defeat of Army of the Republic of Vietnam (ARVN) forces in the Central Highlands in mid-March 1975, People's Army of Vietnam (PAVN) forces pursued the ARVN to the coast, capturing Nha Trang and Nha Trang AB on 2 April, however most of the flyable aircraft of the RVNAF 2nd Air Division had already moved south to Phan Rang AB.

On 1 April crowds of ARVN and civilians began descending on the base from Nha Trang and Cam Ranh seeking evacuation to Saigon. That night the ARVN 3rd Airborne Brigade arrived on trucks at Phan Rang AB having retreated from the M'Đrăk Pass and it proceeded to deploy around the base and clear away VC around the base perimeter.

On 2 April the 2nd Air Division commander BG Nguyễn Văn Lương left Phan Rang in his C-47 to go for meetings at Tan Son Nhut setting off panic among the RVNAF and ARVN forces at the base who believed he was abandoning them and leading to a chaos as panicked South Vietnamese swarmed aircraft that departed haphazardly for bases further south. Two RAAF C-130s landed at the base to evacuate civilians and were mobbed as they tried to leave. Order was eventually restored by the 3rd Airborne Brigade as the refugees were evacuated.

On the morning of 3 April 1975 the RVNAF at Phan Rang launched a heliborne operation comprising more than 40 UH-1s and 6 CH-47s escorted by A-37s to rescue the remnants of the ARVN 2nd, 5th and 6th Airborne Battalions that had been cut off at the M'Đrăk Pass successfully evacuating over 800 soldiers. That day the PAVN 10th Division captured Cam Ranh Bay and Cam Ranh Air Base north of Phan Rang. The USS Durham approached Phan Rang and over the next two days picked up over 3500 South Vietnamese refugees. Also that day 6th Air Division commander BG Pham Ngoc Sang met with the III Corps commander LG Nguyễn Văn Toàn at Phan Thiết and Sang was given responsibility for holding Phan Rang.

On 4 April the two remaining provinces of II Corps were incorporated into III Corps and LG Nguyễn Vĩnh Nghi arrived at Phan Rang to take over the defense of the area from BG Sang. The Phan Rang A-37s continued to operate under difficult conditions with ground crews being forced to service aircraft in Flak jackets due to rocket and mortar fire on the base and intermittent supplies after Highway 1 was cut off east of Xuân Lộc. Half of the wing was rotated daily to Tan Son Nhut for servicing, resupply and crew rest.

From 7 to 8 April the 2nd Airborne Brigade flew into Phan Rang to replace the 3rd Airborne Brigade which moved back to Saigon. On 8 April the 3rd Airborne Battalion cleared Highway 1 and recaptured the villages of Bà Râu (11.7188°N 109.063°E) and Ba Thap (11.68°N 109.038°E) from the VC and the 11th Airborne Battalion then deployed by helicopters to recapture Du Long town (11.781°N 109.078°E) and the Du Long Pass (11.793°N 109.092°E), meanwhile the 5th Airborne Battalion secured the area around Phan Rang AB and cleared Route 11.

On 10 April the PAVN 10th Division left Cam Ranh and moved along Route 450 to join up with Route 11 to take Dalat, passing within 12 miles (19 km) of Phan Rang AB. When RVNAF reconnaissance aircraft observed the movement of the 10th Division, Phan Rang based A-37s began attacking the column, destroying six river-crossing vehicles on 10 April, five trucks on 11 April, seven trucks on 12 April and nine trucks on 13 April.

On 11 April the 5th Airborne Battalion was withdrawn to Saigon and on 12 April the rest of the 2nd Airborne Brigade was ordered to withdraw to Saigon. On 13 April the 31st Rangers arrived by air from Bien Hoa while the ARVN 4th and 5th Regiments, 2nd Division arrived by road from Phan Thiết to replace the Airborne. The 31st Rangers deployed to Du Long to replace the 11th Airborne Battalion on the evening of 13 April.

The PAVN meanwhile had decided to eliminate Phan Rang and at 05:30 on 14 April the PAVN 3rd Division began an artillery attack on the 31st Rangers at Du Long Pass and the 3rd Airborne at Bà Râu. At 06:30 PAVN tanks and infantry attacked to 31st Rangers' position but were forced back. At 07:00 two A-37s accidentally bombed the Rangers. The PAVN then bypassed the Rangers and attacked Du Long Town quickly defeating the Regional Forces there and outflanking the 31st Rangers at the pass. Reinforcements from the 52nd Rangers were sent to support the 31st Rangers, but they were unable to break through and at 16:00 the 31st Rangers were ordered to withdraw with only 80 Rangers successfully returning to Phan Rang AB.

At the same time as the attack on Du Long, the PAVN 25th Regiment infiltrated to attack Phan Rang AB. Despite helicopter gunship fire they successfully penetrated the base and headed for the hangar area where they were met by the 11th Airborne Battalion awaiting transport back to Saigon and four M113 armored personnel carriers which together with air support from the helicopter gunships and A-37s forced the PAVN back outside the perimeter, killing over 100 for the loss of six ARVN killed and one M113 destroyed.

At dawn on 15 April the PAVN shelled the 3rd Airborne Battalion at Bà Râu and Kien Kien (11.704°N 109.0595°E) on Route 1 and then attacked their position. Although outnumbered, the Airborne held back the assault until midday when it blew the highway bridge and then withdrew onto Ca Dau mountain to the east.

At 02:00 on 16 April an RVNAF EC-47 intercepted a PAVN radio transmission indicating an armored attack on Phan Rang would start at 05:00. A-37 aircraft were launched to attack PAVN positions along Route 1 and at 03:00 reconnaissance reported a large PAVN force moving through the Du Long Pass. Meanwhile, VC forces began attacking the base perimeter and on Ca Dau Mountain. At 05:00 the PAVN artillery bombardment commenced and this was soon followed by an armored spearhead of 20 tanks and armored personnel carriers of the 4th Battalion, 203rd Tank Brigade supported by truck mounted infantry of the 101st Regiment and anti-aircraft guns. While the lead tank was destroyed by an ARVN rocket, the PAVN force quickly cut through the 3rd Airborne platoon holding Kien Kien. The RVNAF at the base mounted numerous airstrikes on the armored column destroying vehicles, taking losses from the antiaircraft fire and by 08:00 the armored vehicles were on the outskirts of the city. However the truck-mounted infantry had dispersed to avoid the airstrikes and the anti-aircraft vehicles had not kept up with the advance, leaving the 101st Regiment vulnerable to further air attacks which destroyed or damaged another 16 vehicles and killed numerous PAVN soldiers. The PAVN 3rd Division then attacked the Airborne troops on Ca Dau Mountain and allowed the 101st Regiment to resume its advance. After overcoming a Regional Force roadblock on the outskirts of the city for the loss of two tanks and many infantry, the PAVN pushed into the city capturing the Provincial Headquarters. By 09:30 the PAVN had captured the port and a bridge on Route 1 south of the city, sealing off all sea and land escape routes. At 08:45 a battalion-sized PAVN mechanized force attacked along Route 11 towards the base. While one element attacked the 5th Regiment defending Route 11, the other moved around it to attack the base directly and at the same time the 25th Regiment attacked the north of the base. The 5th Regiment soon broke and ran allowing the PAVN to attack the base's main gate, while the 25th Regiment penetrated the north perimeter with explosives and captured the bomb storage area. The Airborne attempted a counterattack against the 25th Regiment, but were forced back and then squeezed between the PAVN and by 09:30 the PAVN had captured the base. Nghi ordered his remaining forces to retreat from the base to the Ca Na peninsula (11.3455°N 108.877°E) 19 miles (31 km) south of the base and after cutting through the perimeter fence a large group of RVNAF, ARVN and South Vietnamese civilians fled the base joining up with the 11th Airborne outside the base. At midnight on 17 April the ARVN Airborne attacked a PAVN force on Route 11, but in the confusion of the attack LG Nghi, his command group and CIA Agent James Lewis became separated and at 02:00 were captured by the PAVN.

As the base was falling an A-37 braved the PAVN fire and landed rescuing RVNAF 92nd Wing commander Colonel Le Van Thao. Of the Wing's 72 A-37s, only 24 escaped on 16 April with the rest having been shot down or abandoned.

== Post 1975 use ==
With its capture, Phan Rang Air Base became a Vietnam People's Air Force (VPAF) base. It is unclear to what extent the former USAF facilities were used, although aerial imagery shows that a large amount of the station was torn down over the years, the large base simply being too big for the VPAF, in addition the 04R/22L runway was inactivated, and today is almost obliterated. A few of the hangars remain standing, others have been torn down. The large aircraft parking ramp and concrete aircraft shelters remain, although the shelters appear to have been left unused. Steel and sand revetments also remain on the ramp.

The captured aircraft at Phan Rang AB were later used by the VPAF in missions during the Cambodian–Vietnamese War. The A-37s flew most of the ground support missions in those conflicts, being more suited to the role than the VPAF's MiG-17s and MiG-21s. Several squadrons of captured UH-1H Hueys were also operated by the VPAF for many years from Phan Rang.

The base is now used by the VADAF 937th Fighter Regiment equipped with Sukhoi Su-22 fighter-bombers, with one single runway (04L/22R) being maintained and utilized as the 04/22.

== See also ==
- Republic of Vietnam Air Force
- United States Air Force in South Vietnam
- United States Pacific Air Forces
- Seventh Air Force

== Bibliography ==
- Endicott, Judy G. (1999) Active Air Force wings as of 1 October 1995; USAF active flying, space, and missile squadrons as of 1 October 1995. Maxwell AFB, Alabama: Office of Air Force History. CD-ROM.
- Martin, Patrick (1994). Tail Code: The Complete History of USAF Tactical Aircraft Tail Code Markings. Schiffer Military Aviation History. ISBN 0-88740-513-4.
- Mesco, Jim (1987) VNAF Republic of Vietnam Air Force 1945–1975 Squadron/Signal Publications. ISBN 0-89747-193-8
- Mikesh, Robert C. (2005) Flying Dragons: The Republic of Vietnam Air Force. Schiffer Publishing, Ltd. ISBN 0-7643-2158-7
- USAF Historical Research Division/Organizational History Branch – 35th Fighter Wing, 366th Wing
- VNAF – The Republic of Vietnam Air Force 1951–1975
- USAAS-USAAC-USAAF-USAF Aircraft Serial Numbers—1908 to present
