= RAF Deenethorpe =

Airfield in Northamptonshire, England

RAF Deenethorpe USAAF Station 128
- Located near Corby, Northamptonshire, England
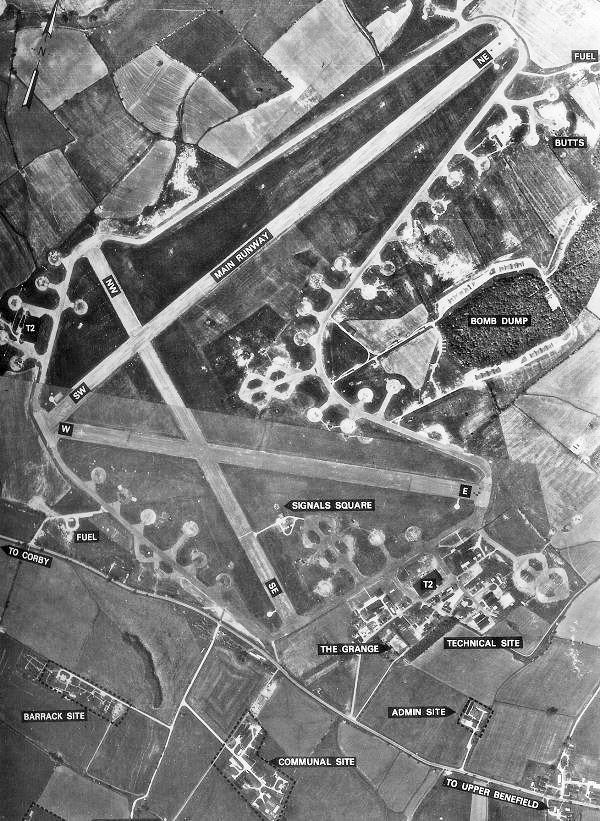
- Aerial Photo of Deenethorpe Airfield - 28 May 1945

Site information
- Type: Royal Air Force station
- Code: DP
- Controlled by: Royal Air Force; United States Army Air Forces

Location
- RAF Deenethorpe shown within Northamptonshire (grid reference SP960900)
- Coordinates: 52°30′09″N 000°35′06″W

Site history
- Built: 1943
- In use: 1943-1963
- Battles/wars: European Theatre of World War II; Air Offensive, Europe July 1942 - May 1945

Garrison information
- Garrison: Eighth Air Force
- Occupants: 401st Bombardment Group

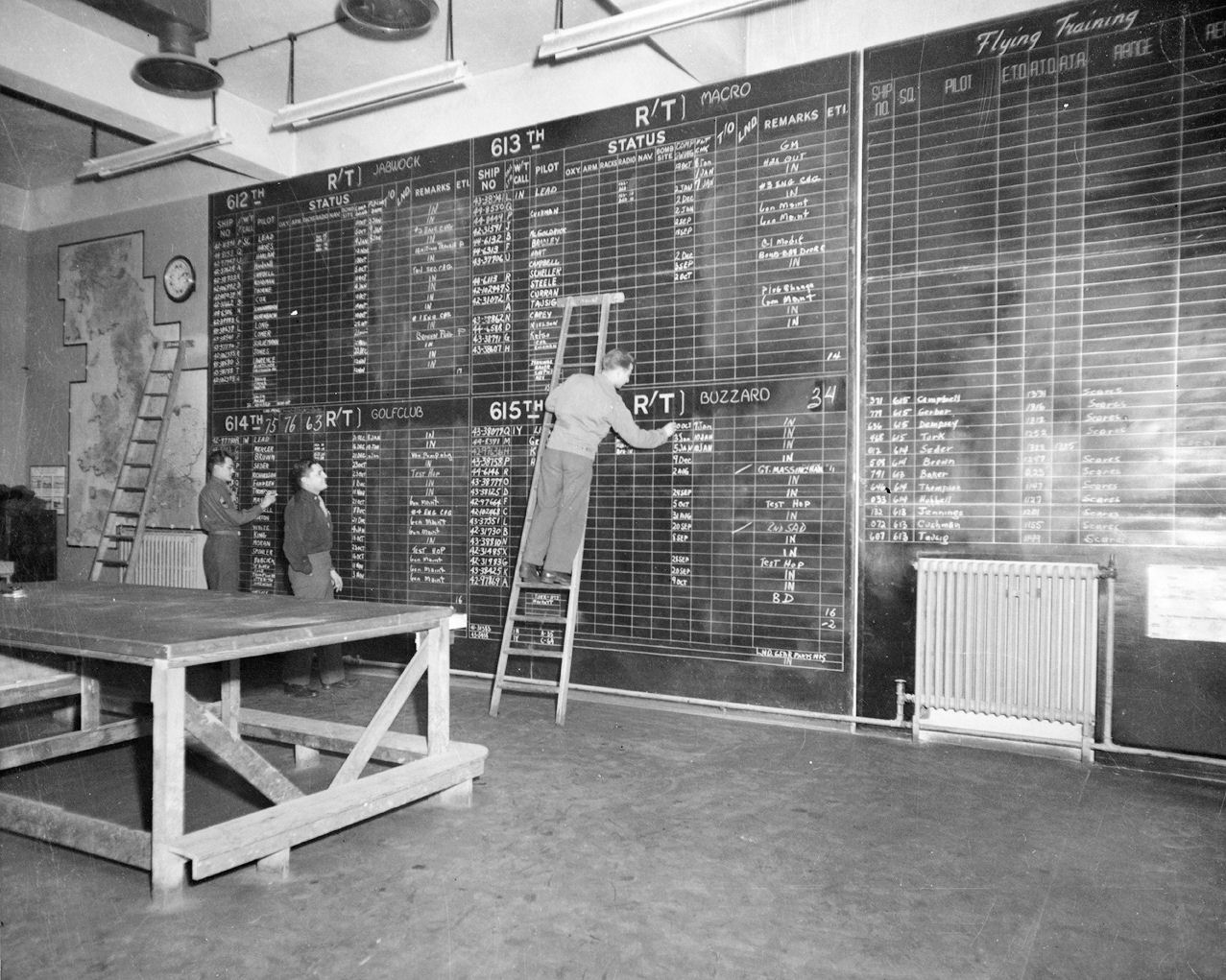
An airman of the 401st Bomb Group updates the operations board. 13 January 1945.

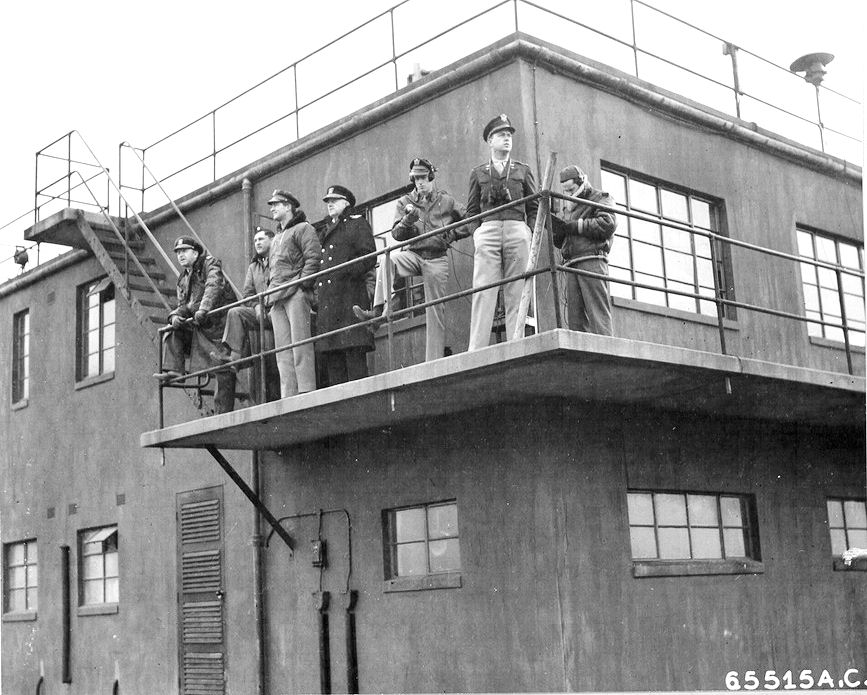
RAF Deenethorpe Control Tower, waiting for the return of a mission, 26 February 1945

Royal Air Force Deenethorpe or more simply RAF Deenethorpe is a former Royal Air Force station located 2 miles (3.2 km) east of Corby, Northamptonshire, England. It has one remaining tarmac runway at 1200m (3937ft) long.

== United States Army Air Forces use ==
Deenethorpe was constructed in 1943 and was allocated to the United States Army Air Forces Eighth Air Force. It was assigned USAAF designation Station 128.

USAAF Station Units assigned to RAF Deenethorpe were:

- 450th Sub-Depot
- 431st Air Service Group

681st Air Materiel Squadron
857th Air Engineering Squadron

- 18th Weather Squadron
- 78th Station Complement Squadron
- 831st Engineer Aviation Battalion
- 1199th Military Police Company
- 1209th Quartermaster Company
- 1597th Ordnance Supply & Maintenance Company
- 861st Chemical Company (Air Operations)
- 2095th Engineer Fire Fighting Platoon

=== 401st Bombardment Group (Heavy) ===
With the opening of the airfield in October 1943, the 401st Bombardment Group (Heavy), arrived from Great Falls AAB, Montana, in November. The 401st was assigned to the 94th Combat Bombardment Wing of the 1st Bombardment Division. Its tail code was Triangle-S.

The 401st Bomb Group consisted of the following operational squadrons flying Boeing B-17 Flying Fortress:

- 612th Bombardment Squadron (SC)
- 613th Bombardment Squadron (IN)
- 614th Bombardment Squadron (IW)
- 615th Bombardment Squadron (IY)

The 401st BG operated chiefly against strategic targets, bombing industries, submarine facilities, shipyards, missile sites, marshalling yards, and airfields; beginning in October 1944, concentrated on oil reserves. The Group received a Distinguished Unit Citation for striking telling blows against German aircraft production on 11 January and 20 February 1944.

In addition to strategic missions, group operations included attacks on transportation, airfields, and fortifications prior to the Normandy invasion and on D-Day, June 1944; support for ground operations during the breakthrough at Saint-Lô in July, the siege of Brest in August, and the airborne attack on the Netherlands in September 1944.

The Group flew missions against enemy forces during the Battle of the Bulge, December 1944 - January 1945, by assaulting transportation targets and communications centres in the battle area; and support for the airborne attack across the Rhine in March 1945.

The worst accident occurred on 5 December 1943 when a Fortress which failed to get off the ground careered over farmland and came to rest after crashing into a cottage on the edge of Deenethorpe village. The surviving members of the crew just had time to evacuate the wreckage and warn the villagers of the imminent explosion of the bomb load before it detonated damaging many houses in the village. The blast was felt in Kettering nine miles away.

After V-E Day, the group departed from Deenethorpe in August 1945 and returned to Sioux Falls AAF where the unit was inactivated, personnel demobilized and B-17 aircraft sent to storage.

The 401st Bombardment Group had flown 255 combat missions from Deenethorpe airfield.

== Postwar use ==
After the war, Deenethorpe was used as an RAF Recruiting Centre, and later for several years the control tower was used as a lookout post by the local Royal Observer Corps. It was finally sold in 1963 and largely returned to agriculture. Part of the old main runway is now used as a private airstrip.

The 600 acres (240 ha) airfield is one of the sites that has been approved for a "garden village" in 2017. The plans include a village green, shops and community hall, as well as more than 1,000 homes.

In 2025, RAF Deenethorpe was used as the venue for an illegal rave.

== Postscript ==
On 17 June 2011, the widow of an American air crewman who took part in bombing raids from the airfield buried a time capsule on the crew's behalf. Joan Parker was married to Tom Parker, the last surviving crew member of the B-17 Lady Luck of the 401st Bombardment Squadron. In a ceremony, Mrs. Parker buried eight glass-bottomed tankards along with a story of the men at the airfield. The crew carried out raids on marshalling yards in Berlin. "It was all agreed that whoever was the last one would bring the tankards back to Deenethorpe," she said. "It took some time trying to gather all of the information." The tankards were a gift from the pilot of Lady Luck, Lt. Bob Kamper, who presented them to the crew at a reunion in 1972. Mr. Parker died in March 2011.

== See also ==
- List of former Royal Air Force stations
