= Tuy Hoa Air Base =

US airbase in Vietnam (1966–1970)

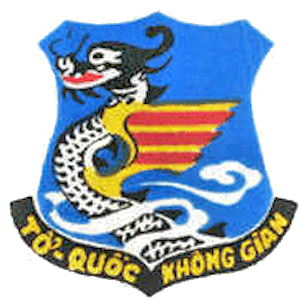
Tuy Hoa Air Base
- Part of Pacific Air Forces (USAF); Republic of Vietnam Air Force (RVNAF)
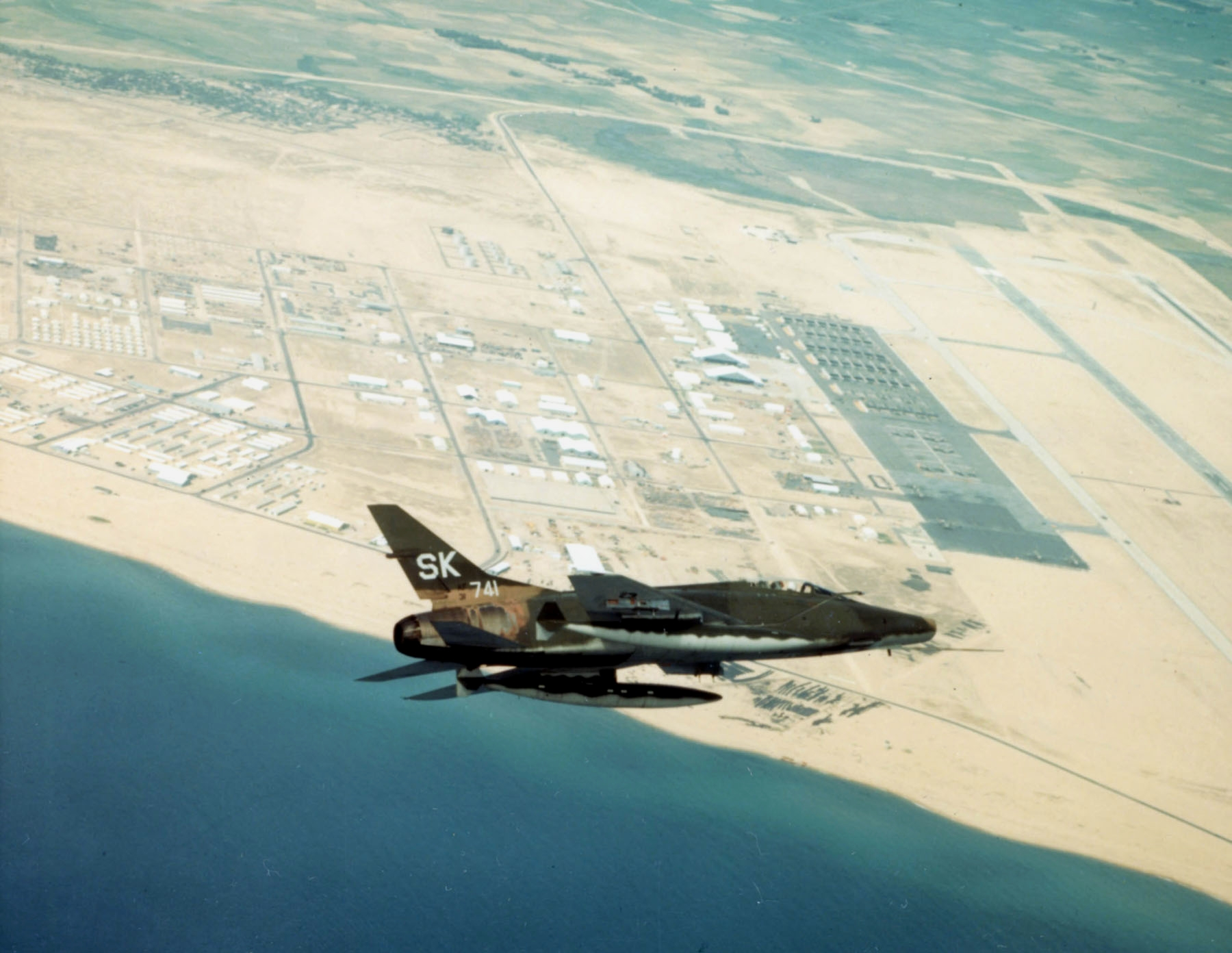
- F-100C of the 188th Tactical Fighter Squadron, New Mexico Air National Guard, over Tuy Hoa Air Base, South Vietnam in 1968.

Site information
- Type: Air Force Base
- Controlled by: United States Air Force
- Condition: Closed 1973, now joint civil and military airport

Location
- Location of Tuy Hoa Air Base, Vietnam
- Coordinates: 13°02′58″N 109°20′01″E

Site history
- Built: 1966
- In use: 1966-present
- Battles/wars: Vietnam War

Garrison information
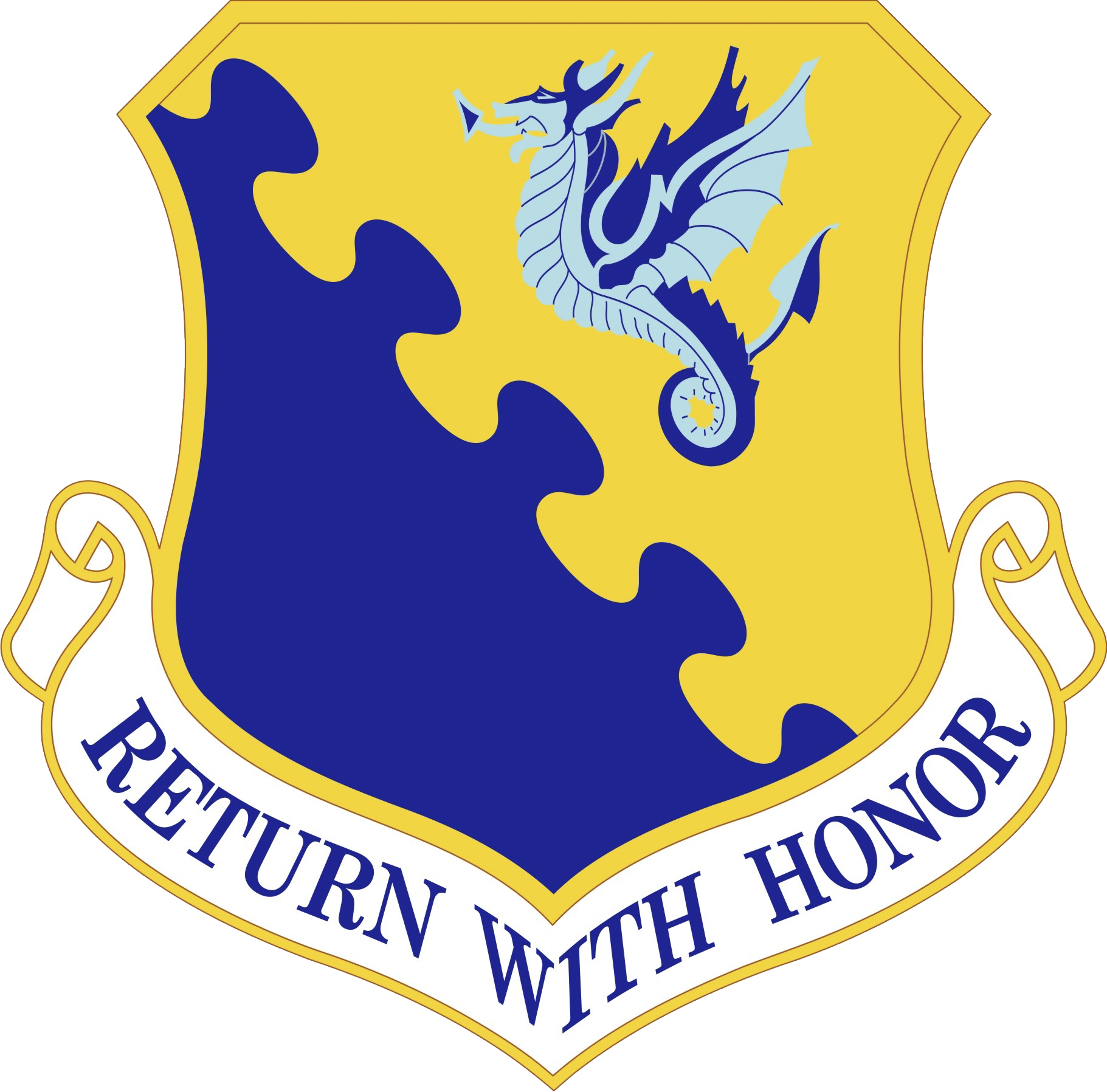
- Garrison: 31st Tactical Fighter Wing (USAF)

Airfield information
- IATA: none; ICAO: none

Summary
- Elevation AMSL: 20 ft (6.1 m)
- Interactive map of Airfield information

Runways
Direction	Length		Surface
Direction	ft	m	Surface
03L/21R	9,520	2,902	Concrete
02/20	2,720	844	Concrete
03L/21L	9,300	2,935	Concrete

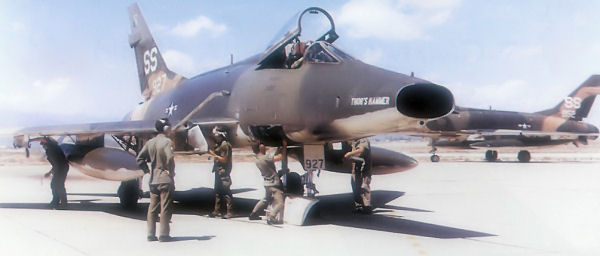
North American F-100D-60-NA Super Sabres Serials 56-2927 (Front) and 56-2952 of the 309th TFS on the ramp at Tuy Hoa, April 1970.

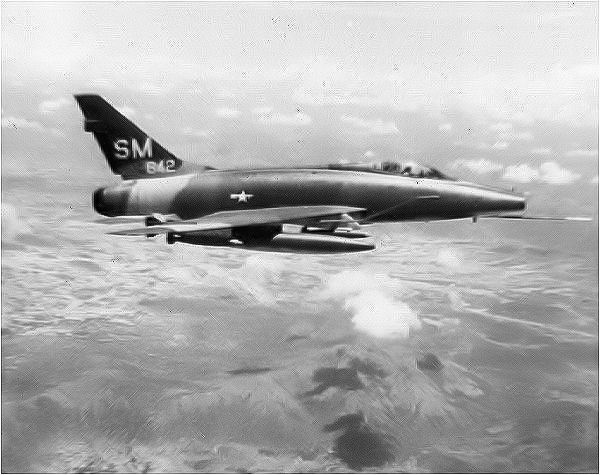
North American F-100D-25-NA Super Sabre Serial 55-3642 of the 308th Tactical Fighter Squadron.

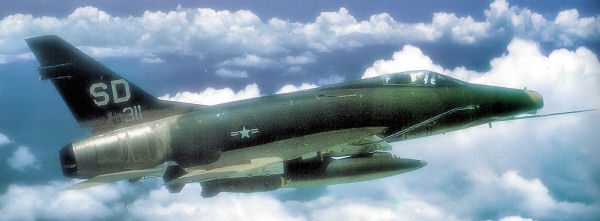
North American F-100D-90-NA Super Sabre Serial 56-3311 of the 306th Tactical Fighter Squadron.

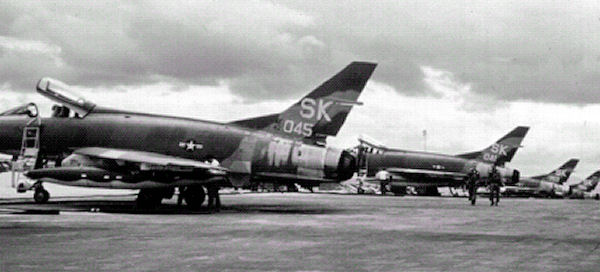
North American F-100C-25-NA Super Sabres on the flightline from the Federalized 188th Tactical Fighter Squadron, New Mexico Air National Guard, 1968. Serial 54-2045 is in foreground.

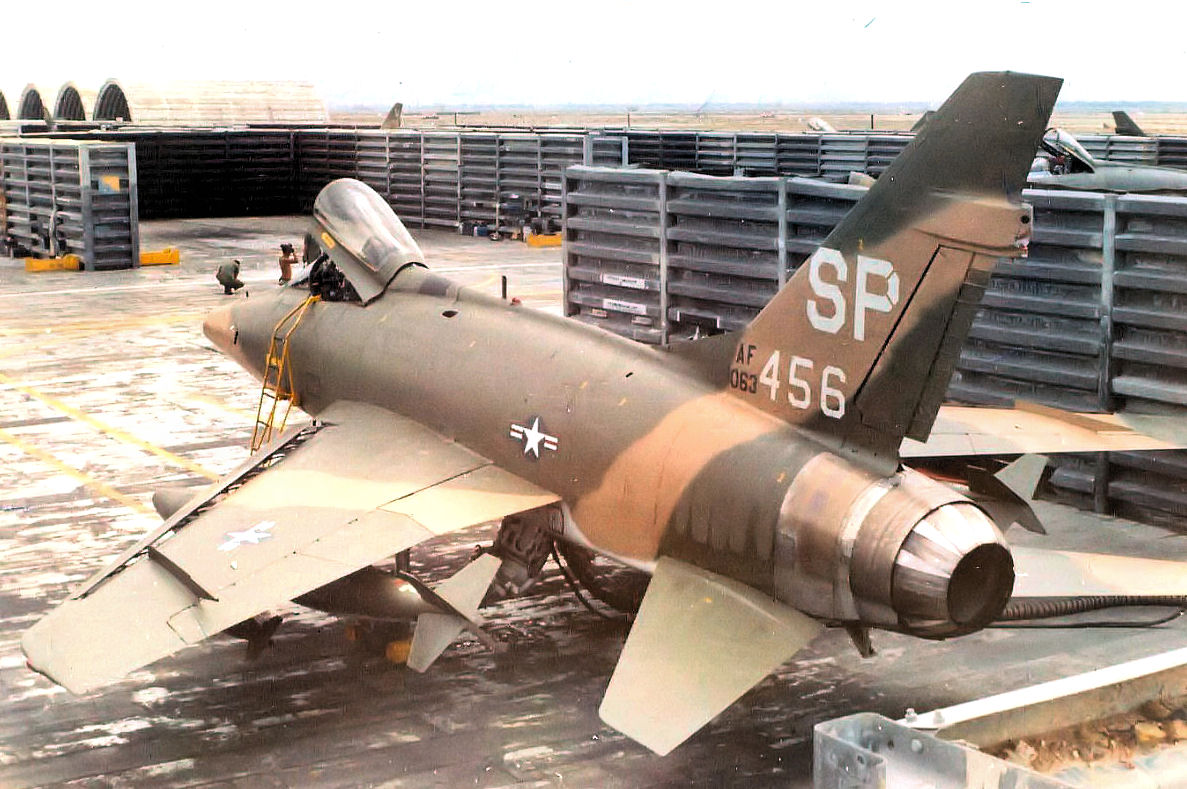
355th TFS F-100D 56-3456 1969

Tuy Hoa Air Base was an air force base in Vietnam built by the United States in 1966 and was used by the United States Air Force (USAF) during the Vietnam War in the II Corps Tactical Zone of South Vietnam. It was captured by the People's Army of Vietnam in April 1975 and was abandoned for several decades. Today, the site has been redeveloped as Tuy Hoa Airport.

== USAF use ==
In September 1965 Tuy Hoa was identified as a potential site for an air base and in October, following feasibility and soil studies, CINCPAC recommended construction of a base there. Military Assistance Command, Vietnam (MACV) originally opposed the decision based on cost, logistical, construction capacity/manpower and security concerns, but in December it agreed to begin construction in January 1966. However, in January construction was postponed by MACV in favour of constructing Phù Cát Air Base. In order to speed up construction of the Tuy Hoa base, in February 1966 Air Force Secretary Harold Brown approached Defense Secretary Robert McNamara for approval to engage a private contractor to build the base. After overcoming opposition from CINCPAC and MACV, the USAF signed a Turnkey contract with Walter Kidde Constructors, Inc. to build the base on 27 May 1966. Walter Kidde committed to achieved interim capability within seven months of contract signing, complete the base within one year and open permanent port facilities within 15 months.

Walter Kidde began construction in June and on 15 November 1966, 45 days ahead of schedule, interim capability was achieved when the 308th Tactical Fighter Squadron equipped with F-100 Super Sabres began arriving at the base. Over the following month the F-100 equipped 306th and the 309th Tactical Fighter Squadrons arrived at the base and on 16 December 1966 the 31st Tactical Fighter Wing became operational at the base. Walter Kidde completed the entire contract on schedule and within budget.

In November 1966 McNamara instructed the Joint Chiefs of Staff to investigate the possibility of basing 15 B-52s at Tuy Hoa. This proposal was opposed by the Joint Chiefs, USAF Secretary Brown and CINCPAC on cost and security grounds.

On 7 June 1968 the Federalized New Mexico Air National Guard 188th Tactical Fighter Squadron deployed to Tuy Hoa and would remain there until 18 May 1969.

On 14 June 1968 the Federalized New York Air National Guard 136th Tactical Fight Squadron deployed to Tuy Hoa and would remain there until 25 May 1969.

On 29 July 1968 a Viet Cong sapper attack on the base destroyed two C-130s and damaged a further five C-130s, one F-100 and one C-47.

In early 1969 Flight A of the 71st Special Operations Squadron equipped with AC-119G Shadow gunships moved to Tuy Hoa from Nha Trang Air Base, it was later replaced by Flight A of the 17th Special Operations Squadron equipped with 4 AC-119G gunships. On 12 April 1970 Flight A moved from Tuy Hoa to Phù Cát Air Base.

On 15 May 1969 the 355th Tactical Fighter Squadron deployed to Tuy Hoa.

On 28 May 1969 the 416th Tactical Fighter Squadron moved to Tuy Hoa from Bien Hoa Air Base.

On 13 July 1970 the last "Wonderarch" concrete and steel aircraft protection shelters were completed at the base.

On 15 October 1970 the 31st Tactical Fighter Wing left Tuy Hoa and moved without personnel or equipment to Homestead Air Force Base.

== US Army use ==
In late 1970, the base was renamed Tuy Hoa Army Airfield and various U.S. Army units, including all army aviation units based at Phú Hiệp Airfield were relocated here. The facility was turned over to South Vietnamese government control on 15 January 1972.

== Present use ==
The base is, as of 2018, used as a training base for the Vietnam Air Defence - Air Force and a civilian airport.

== Accidents and incidents ==
- On 22 April 1970, Douglas C-47A B-308 of Winner Airways overran the runway on landing and was damaged beyond repair.
