= 930th Operations Group =

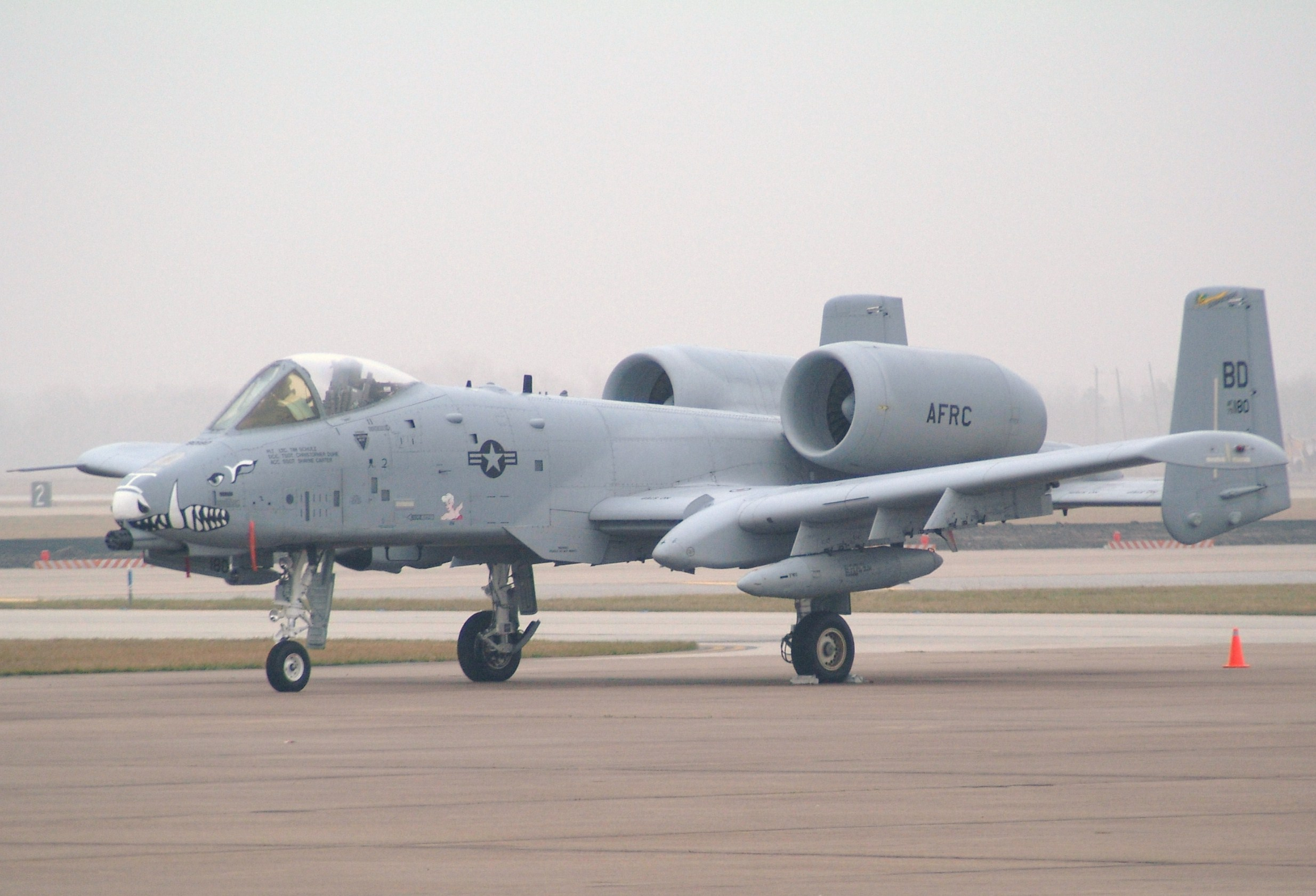
- An A-10 Thunderbolt II of the Air Force Reserve
- Active: 1963-1975; 1987-1994
- Country: United States
- Branch: United States Air Force
- Role: Fighter
- Part of: United States Air Force Reserve

Insignia
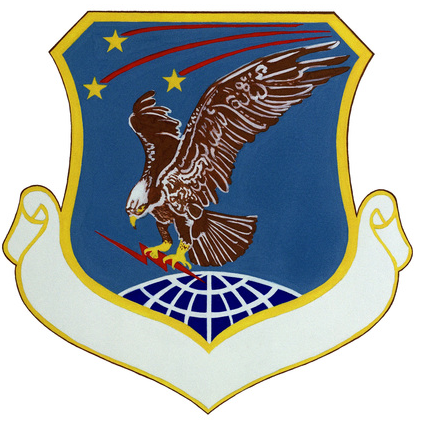
- 930th Operations Group emblem

The 930th Operations Group is an inactive United States Air Force Reserve unit. It was last active with the 434th Wing, based at Grissom Air Reserve Base, Indiana. It was inactivated on 1 October 1994.

== History ==
=== Need for reserve troop carrier groups ===
After May 1959, the reserve flying force consisted of 45 troop carrier squadrons assigned to 15 troop carrier wings. (Note: There were an additional four rescue squadrons not assigned to the wings. Cantwell, p. 156) The squadrons were not all located with their parent wings, but were spread over thirty-five Air Force, Navy and civilian airfields under what was called the Detached Squadron Concept. The concept offered several advantages. Communities were more likely to accept the smaller squadrons than the large wings and the location of separate squadrons in smaller population centers would facilitate recruiting and manning. However, under this concept, all support organizations were located with the wing headquarters. Although this was not a problem when the entire wing was called to active service, mobilizing a single flying squadron and elements to support it proved difficult. This weakness was demonstrated in the partial mobilization of reserve units during the Berlin Crisis of 1961. To resolve this, at the start of 1962, Continental Air Command, (ConAC) determined to reorganize its reserve wings by establishing groups with support elements for each of its troop carrier squadrons. This reorganization would facilitate mobilization of elements of wings in various combinations when needed.

=== Activation of the 930th Troop Carrier Group ===
As a result, the 930th Troop Carrier Group was activated at Atterbury Air Force Base, Indiana on 11 February 1963 as the headquarters for the 71st Troop Carrier Squadron, which had been stationed there since February 1953. Along with group headquarters, a Combat Support Squadron, Materiel Squadron and a Tactical Infirmary were organized to support the 71st.

If mobilized, the group was gained by Tactical Air Command (TAC), which was also responsible for its training. Its mission was to organize, recruit and train Air Force reservists with Fairchild C-119 Flying Boxcars in the tactical airlift of airborne forces, their equipment and supplies and delivery of these forces and materials by airdrop, landing or cargo extraction systems.

The group was one of three C-119 groups assigned to the 434th Troop Carrier Wing in 1963, the others being the 931st Troop Carrier Group, also at Bakalar and the 932d Troop Carrier Group at Scott Air Force Base, Illinois.

The 930th performed routine reserve airlift operations until 13 May 1968 when the group was activated for combat duty in the Vietnam War. The 71st Tactical Airlift Squadron's C-119 aircraft were selected for modification to the Fairchild AC-119G Shadow gunship configuration with powerful searchlights and rapid-fire machine guns. The 71st Squadron was reassigned to the 1st Special Operations Wing and moved to Lockbourne Air Force Base, Ohio on 1 June for training, and later deployed to Nha Trang Air Base.

=== Special Operations ===
Although without an operational squadron, the 930th was redesignated the 930th Special Operations Group. When the 71st Special Operations Squadron returned from service in South Vietnam in 1969, the group was re-organized and equipped with the squadron's returning AC-119Gs. It was assigned to the 302d Tactical Airlift Wing at Bakalar, although shortly thereafter Bakalar was closed and the unit moved to the active-duty Grissom Air Force Base later in January 1970.

The group provided AC-119 gunship training for pilots, navigators, flight engineers, and mechanics of USAF active units and personnel from Jordan, Morocco, Ethiopia, and South Vietnam until the end of 1970 when the Shadow gunships were retired by the Air Force.

On 15 January 1971, the Air Force activated the 434th Special Operations Wing at Grissom, and the 930th was returned to its original wing, albeit with a new mission. It received Cessna A-37B Dragonfly counter-insurgency aircraft being returned from South Vietnam. The A-37s were primarily an export aircraft used for foreign military sales and the group trained personnel from other Air Force Reserve squadrons and Latin American Air Forces in the use of the aircraft.

The 71st Squadron was inactivated on 1 October 1973, and was replaced by the 45th Tactical Fighter Squadron in a reorganization. The 45th was attached to the 434th Tactical Fighter Wing, and the 930th was placed in a non-operational status. On 1 July 1975 it was inactivated.

=== Tactical Fighter ===
Reactivated in 1987 as the 930th Tactical Fighter Group, and equipped with Fairchild Republic A-10 Thunderbolt II ground support aircraft. Trained reserve personnel in close air support, anti-armor, battlefield air interdiction, and combat search and rescue missions.

In 1992, the group was transferred back to its original 434th Wing again part of the transition of the 434th Air Refueling Wing to the objective organization plan. It was redesignated as the 930th Operations Group under the 434th Wing, being the fighter component of the now composite wing. However, the post-Cold War era cutbacks were the order of the day, and the 1993 Base Realignment and Closure directed realignment of Grissom to the Air Force Reserve as an air refueling base. The 930th was inactivated and its A-10 aircraft were reassigned to other units. The 45th Fighter Squadron was inactivated on 30 September 1994; the 930th the next day on 1 October.

== Lineage ==
- Established as the 930th Troop Carrier Group, Medium and activated on 15 January 1963 (not organized)

Organized in the reserve on 11 February 1963
Redesignated 930th Tactical Airlift Group on 1 July 1967
Ordered to active service on 13 May 1968

- Redesignated 930th Air Commando Group on 15 June 1968
- Redesignated 930th Special Operations Group on 8 July 1969
- Released from active duty on 10 June 1969
- Redesignated 930th Tactical Fighter Group on 1 October 1973

Inactivated 1 July 1975

- Activated in the reserve on 1 July 1987

Redesignated 930th Fighter Group on 1 February 1992
Redesignated 930th Operations Group on 1 August 1992
Inactivated on 1 October 1994

=== Assignments ===
- Continental Air Command, 15 January 1963 (not organized)
- 434th Troop Carrier Wing (later Tactical Airlift Wing), 11 February 1963
- 838th Air Division, 13 May 1968
- 302d Tactical Airlift Wing, 1 June 1968
- 403d Composite Wing, 1 June 1970
- 434th Special Operations Wing, 15 January 1971 – 1 July 1975 (not operational after 1 October 1973)
- 442d Tactical Fighter Wing (later 442d Fighter Wing), 1 July 1987 – 1 August 1992
- 434th Wing, 1 August 1992 – 1 October 1994

=== Components ===
- 71st Troop Carrier Squadron (later 71st Special Operations Squadron), 11 February 1963 – 1 June 1968; 10 June 1969 – 1 October 1973
- 45th Tactical Fighter Squadron (later 45th Fighter Squadron), 1 October 1973 – 1 July 1975, 1 July 1987 – 30 September 1994

=== Stations ===
- Atterbury Air Force Base (later Bakalar Air Force Base), Indiana, 11 February 1963
- Grissom Air Force Base, Indiana, 15 January 1970 – 1 July 1975
- Grissom Air Force Base, Indiana, 1 July 1987 – 1 October 1994

=== Aircraft ===
- Fairchild C-119 Flying Boxcar, 1963–1968
- Fairchild AC-119G Shadow, 1968, 1969–1970
- Cessna A-37B Dragonfly, 1971–1980
- Fairchild Republic A-10 Thunderbolt II, 1980–1994
