= 838th Air Division =

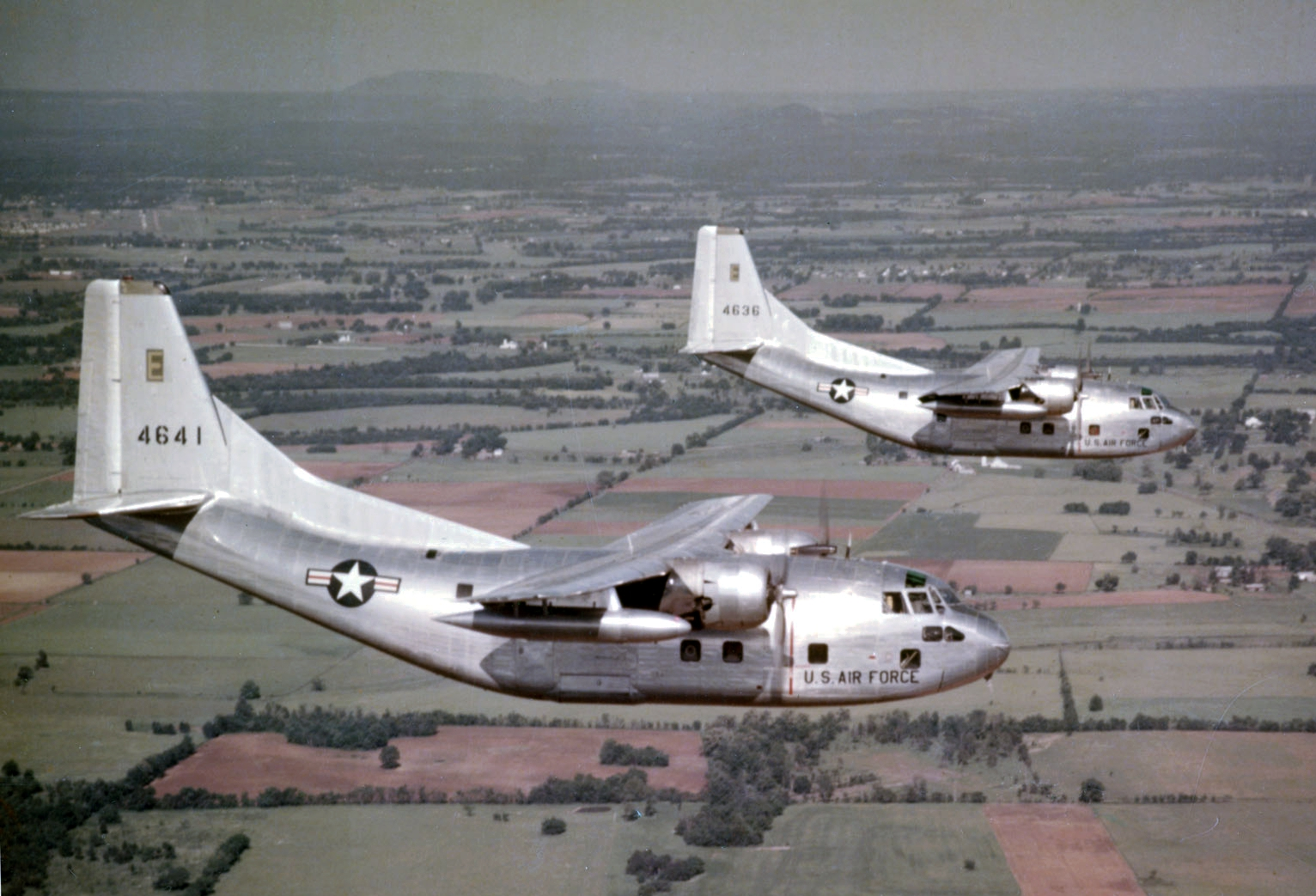
- C-123 Providers in flight in the late 1950s (Note: Aircraft are Fairchid C-123B-7-FA Providers, serials 54-641 (transferred to CIA for flights from Taiwan, crashed in the summer of 1965) and 54-636 (later converted to C-123K, transferred to Air America for operations in Laos in 1968) Baugher, Joe (24 July 2023). "1954 USAF Serial Numbers". Joe Baugher.)
- Active: 1957; 1963–1966
- Country: United States
- Branch: United States Air Force
- Role: Command of tactical airlift forces

Commanders
- Notable commanders: Lt Gen Ernest C. Hardin Jr.

Insignia
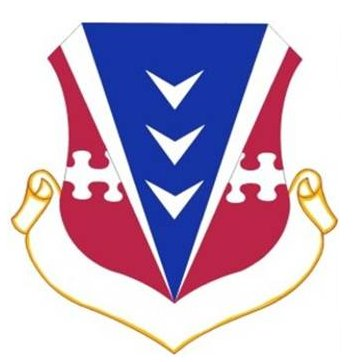
- 838th Air Division (Note: Approved 10 December 1964. Description: Gules, a fess nebuly counter nebuly debruised by a pile argent bearing a pile azure converging at base point charged in pale with three futuristic aircraft of the second [color mentioned].)

The 838th Air Division is an inactive United States Air Force organization. Its last assignment was with Tactical Air Command, assigned to Twelfth Air Force at Forbes Air Force Base, Kansas. It was inactivated on 24 December 1969.

The division was first activated in the fall of 1957 at Ardmore Air Force Base, where the 463d Troop Carrier Wing and 419th Troop Carrier Group were stationed. However, the 419th, which was flying Fairchild C-123 Providers, was inactivated in December, rather than upgrading to a wing and the 838th was inactivated along with it.

== History ==
=== Ardmore Air Force Base ===
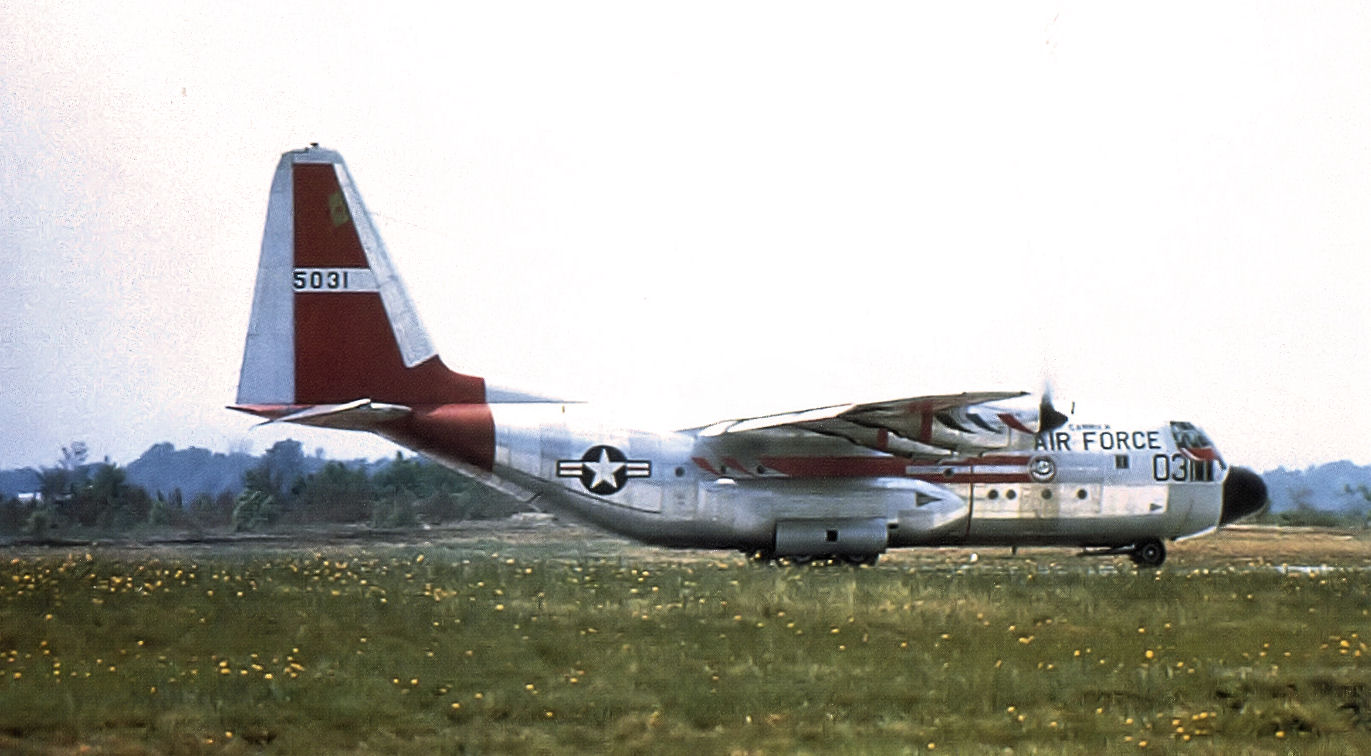
463d Troop Carrier Wing C-130A (Note: Aircraft is Lockheed C-130A-LM Hercules serial 55-031. This plane was modified to C-130D configuration, later transferred to the Mexican Air Force. Baugher, Joe (27 July 2023). "1955 USAF Serial Numbers". Joe Baugher. Photo taken in 1957.)

The 838th Air Division was first activated on 25 September 1957 at Ardmore Air Force Base, Oklahoma in anticipation that the 419th Troop Carrier Group would be expanded to a wing, joining the 463d Troop Carrier Wing at Ardmore. The division's 838th Air Base Group assumed the management of the base from the 463d Air Base Group, which was inactivated upon transferring its resources. However, the 463d Wing was converting from the Fairchild C-123 Provider to become the Air Force's first Lockheed C-130 Hercules wing and it was decided to inactivate the 419th and its Providers before the end of the year, along with the new division. The division commander, Col James L. Daniel Jr., had been the commander of the 463d wing before the division was activated and returned to that command when the division and 419th Group were inactivated on 11 December 1957. The 838th Air Base Group was reassigned to the 463d Wing and remained the base host unit.

=== Pope and Forbes Air Force Bases ===
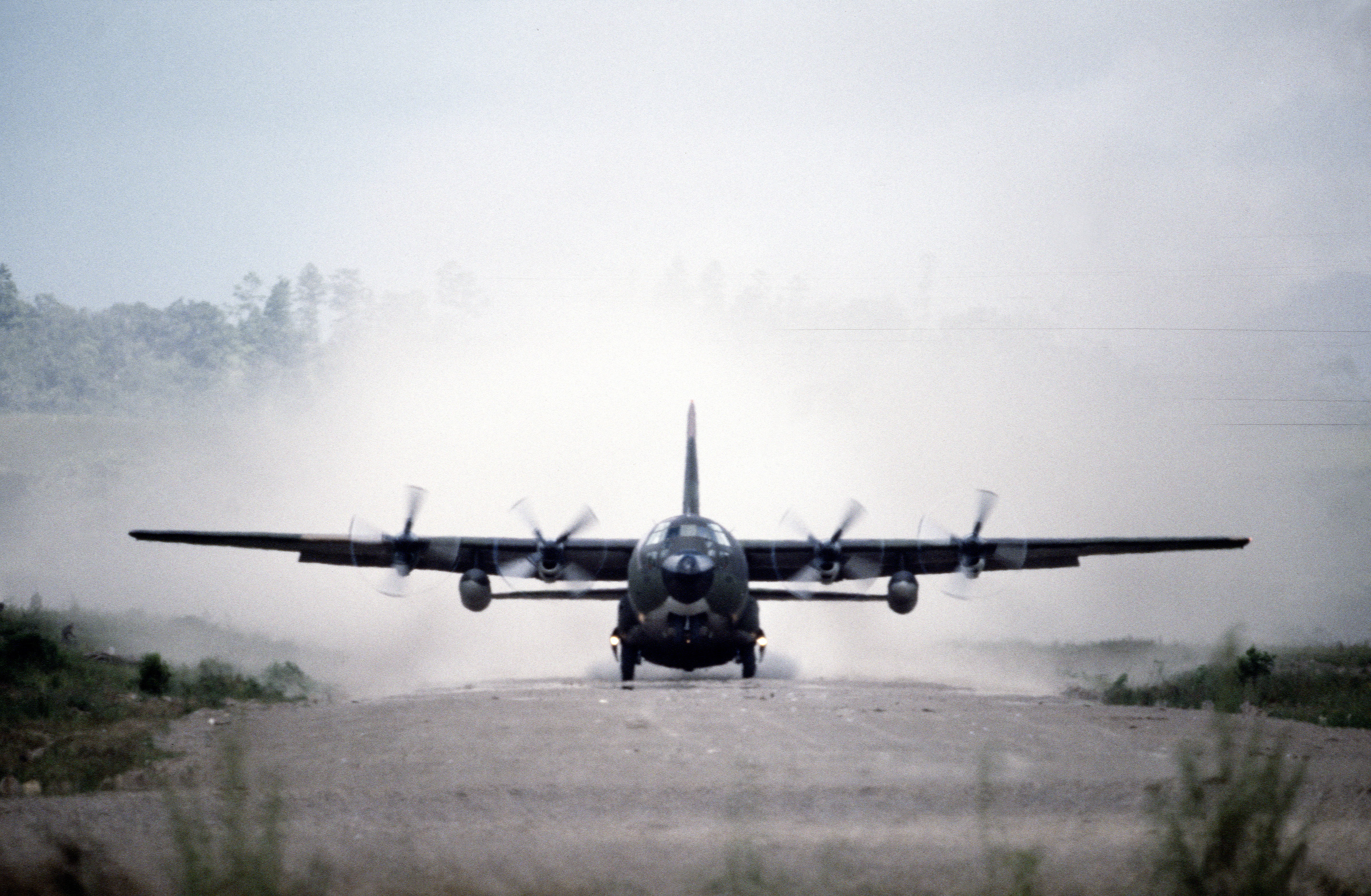
C-130 taking off during an exercise

The division was reactivated at Pope Air Force Base in July 1963 and was assigned the 464th Troop Carrier Wing, a C-123 wing stationed there. In October the 463d Troop Carrier Wing, which had recently moved to Langley Air Force Base, Virginia was again assigned to the 838th. Both wings performed worldwide tactical airlift and participated in tactical exercises and operations. Its 463d Wing supported forces deploying in response to the Gulf of Tonkin incident in Operation One Buck beginning shortly after the incident in August 1964. The 464th Wing conducted combat crew training until April 1964 and kept two of its squadrons deployed overseas for most of the period it was assigned. It was awarded the MacKay Trophy in 1964 for Operation Dragon Rouge, the humanitarian airlift of over 1500 refugees from the Republic of the Congo in an operation that continued after it was reassigned to another division. It also received an Air Force Outstanding Unit Award for the actions of its elements deployed to Vietnam performing combat airlift missions. The 464th had sent two squadrons of Providers to South Vietnam during 1962 in Operation Mule Train and Operation Ranch Hand. The crews and planes operated as provisional units there. These planes were joined by a third squadron in 1963, although all were eventually transferred to regular Pacific Air Forces units of the 315th Troop Carrier Group.

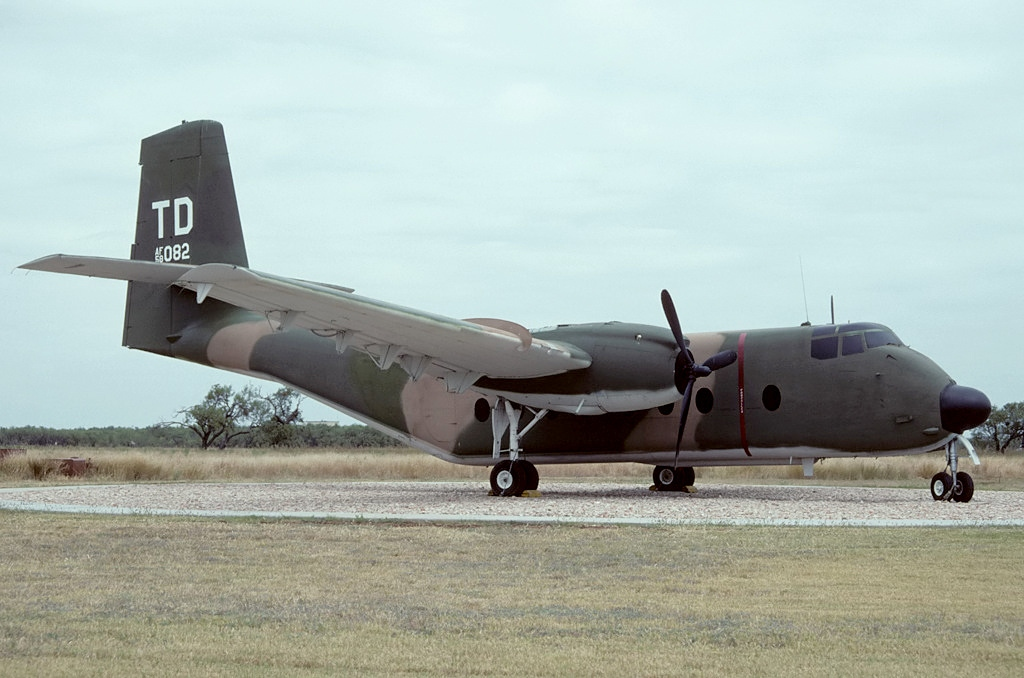
C-7A Caribou at Dyess AFB

In November 1964, the division moved from Pope to Forbes Air Force Base, Kansas. The 463d and 464th Wings were relieved from assignment to the division and the 313th Troop Carrier Wing at Forbes and the 516th Troop Carrier Wing at Dyess Air Force Base, Texas were transferred to the 838th's command Until the division inactivated, its wings frequently deployed aircraft and personnel to Europe, the Far East, and the Panama Canal Zone.

In May 1968, the 930th Tactical Airlift Group, flying Fairchild C-119 Flying Boxcars was called to active duty. the C-119s of its 71st Tactical Airlift Squadron had been selected for conversion to AC-119 Shadow gunship configuration. The group's stay with the 838th was short, however and it was returned to reserve status on 1 June 1968, while its 71st Squadron was transferred to the 1st Special Operations Wing.

In August 1969, the 516th Wing began training aircrews on the de Havilland Canada C-7 Caribou. The 838th was inactivated in December 1969 and its units were reassigned directly to Twelfth Air Force.

== Lineage ==
- Established as the 838 Air Division on 30 August 1957

Activated on 25 September 1957
Inactivated on 11 December 1957

- Activated on 13 June 1963 (not organized)

Organized on 1 July 1963
Inactivated on 24 December 1969

=== Assignments ===
- Ninth Air Force, 25 September – 11 December 1957
- Tactical Air Command, 13 June 1963 (not organized)
- Twelfth Air Force, 1 July 1963 – 24 December 1969

=== Stations ===
- Ardmore Air Force Base, Oklahoma, 25 September – 11 December 1957
- Pope Air Force Base, North Carolina, 1 July 1963
- Forbes Air Force Base, Kansas, 9 November 1964 – 24 December 1969

=== Components ===
Wings

- 313th Troop Carrier Wing (later 313 Tactical Airlift Wing): 9 November 1964 – 24 December 1969
- 463d Troop Carrier Wing: 25 September – 11 December 1957; 1 October 1963 – 9 November 1964

Langley Air Force Base, Virginia, 1963–1964

- 464th Troop Carrier Wing: 1 July 1963 – 9 November 1964
- 516th Troop Carrier Wing (later 516 Tactical Airlift Wing): 9 November 1964 – 24 December 1969

Dyess Air Force Base, Texas

Groups

- 419th Troop Carrier Group: 25 September – 11 December 1957
- 838th Air Base Group: 25 September – 11 December 1957
- 930th Tactical Airlift Group: 13 May – 1 June 1968

Bakalar Air Force Base, Indiana

=== Aircraft ===
- Fairchild C-123 Provider, 1957, 1963–1964
- Lockheed C-130 Hercules, 1957, 1963–1969
- Fairchild C-119 Flying Boxcar, 1968
- de Havilland Canada C-7 Caribou, 1969

=== Commanders ===
- Col James L. Daniel Jr., 25 September – 11 December 1957
- Brig Gen William T. Daly, 1 July 1963
- Brig Gen Ernest C. Hardin Jr., c. 7 August 1964
- Brig Gen Burl W. McLaughlin, c. January 1965
- Brig Gen Joseph N. Donovan, c. 22 March 1966
- Col William G. Duncan, c. June 1967
- Col Clarence B. Slaughter, c. 1 June – 24 November 1969

== See also ==
- List of Lockheed C-130 Hercules operators
- List of United States Air Force air divisions
