= Nha Trang Airport (disambiguation) =

Nha Trang Airport may refer to two airports serving Nha Trang, Khánh Hòa Province, Vietnam:

- Cam Ranh International Airport, opened 1965
- Nha Trang Air Base (1949–2009), used by the French, American, and Vietnamese militaries during the Indochina and Vietnamese wars
