= 17th Special Operations Squadron =

17th Special Operations Squadron

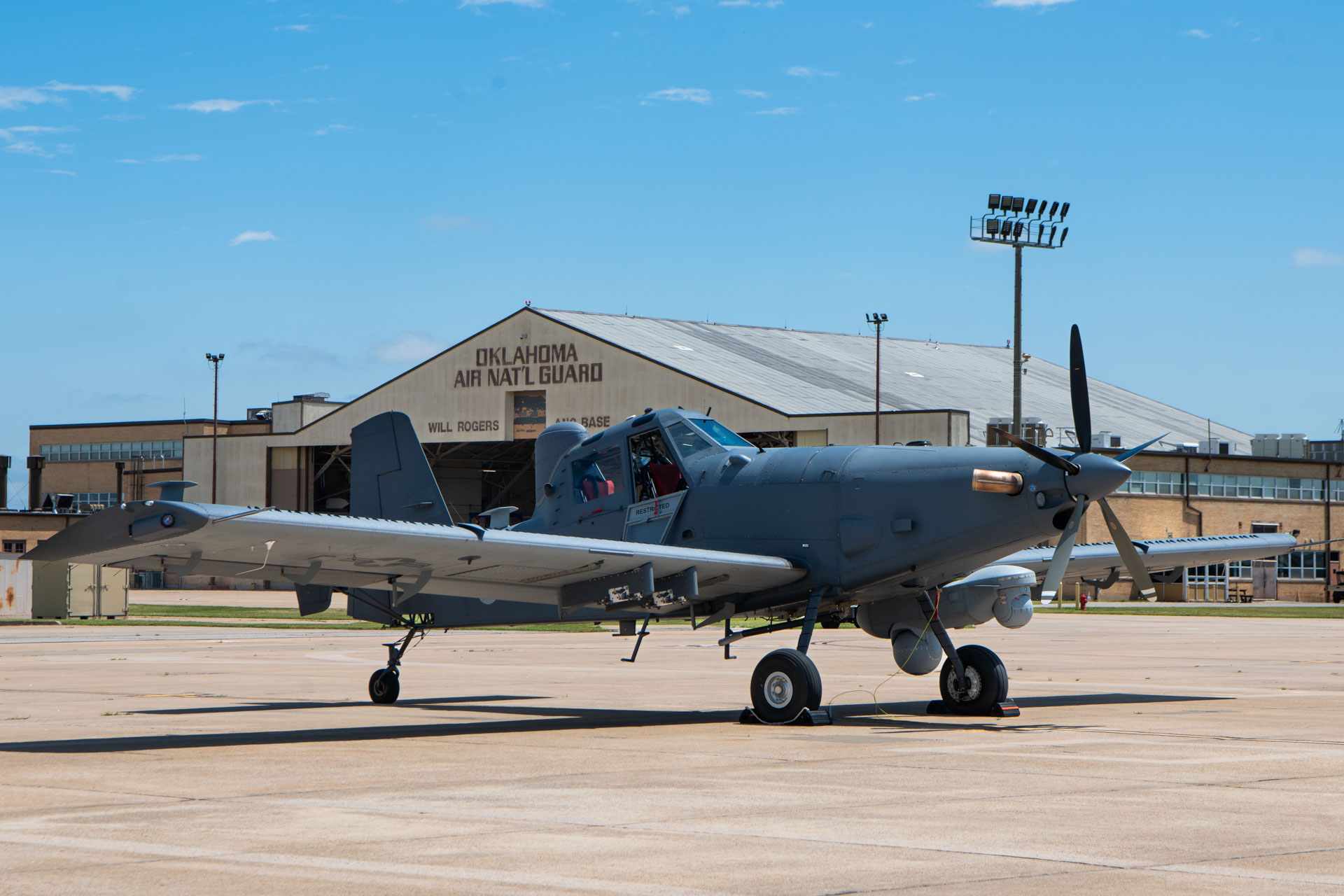
- OA-1K Skyraider II at Will Rogers Air National Guard Base
- Active: 1942–1946; 1952–1953; 1969–1971; 1989–present
- Country: United States
- Branch: United States Air Force
- Role: Special operations
- Part of: Air Force Special Operations Command
- Garrison/HQ: Will Rogers Air National Guard Base, Oklahoma
- Motto: No Mission Too Demanding (Note: Approved 30 July 1990. Endicott, p. 455.)
- Mascot: Jackal
- Engagements: Southwest Pacific Theater; Vietnam War
- Decorations: Distinguished Unit Citation; Presidential Unit Citation; Air Force Meritorious Unit Award; Air Force Outstanding Unit Award with Combat "V"; Air Force Outstanding Unit Award; Philippine Presidential Unit Citation; Republic of Vietnam Gallantry Cross with Palm

Insignia
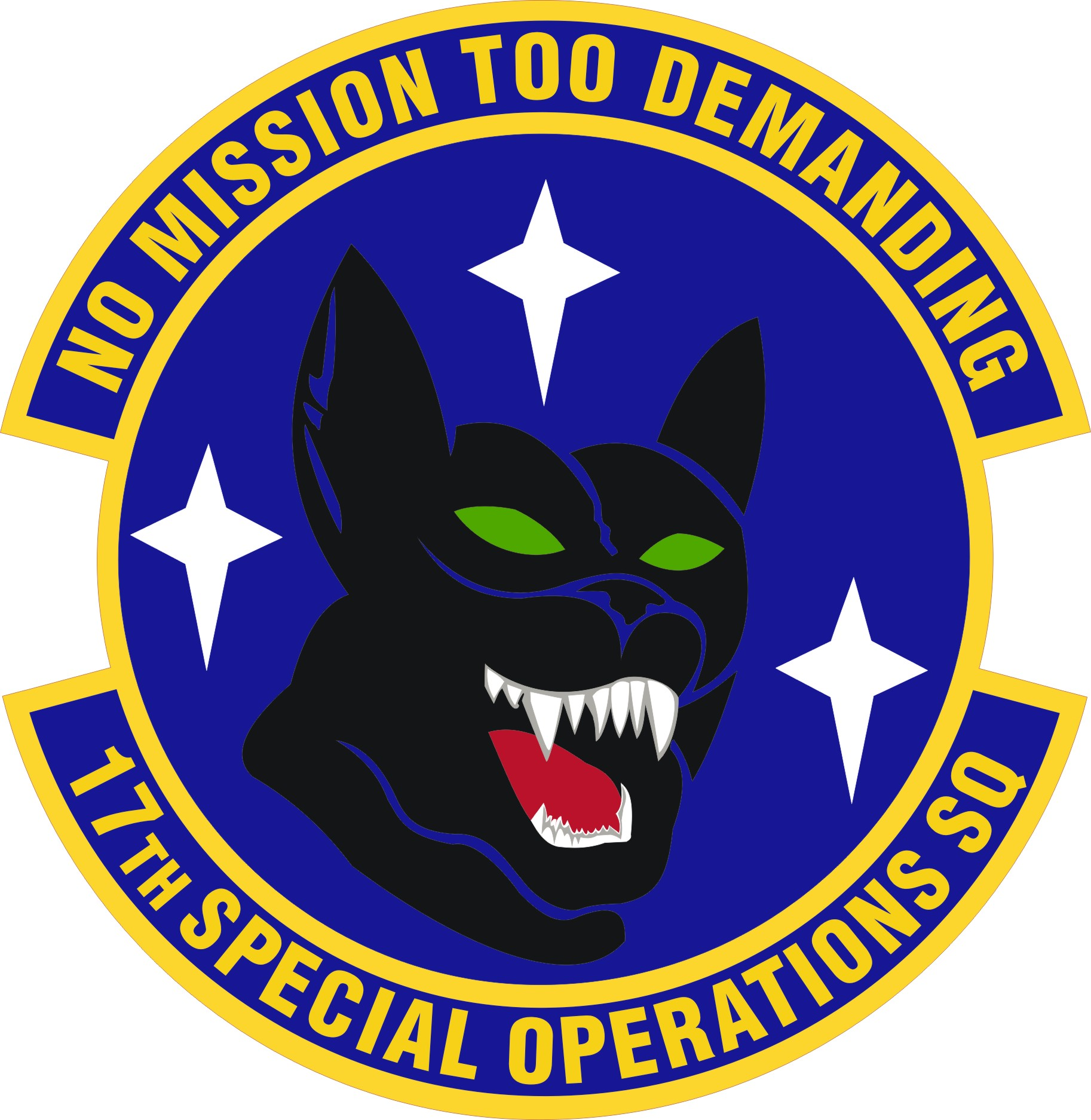
- 17th Special Operations Squadron emblem (Note: Approved 19 July 1993.)

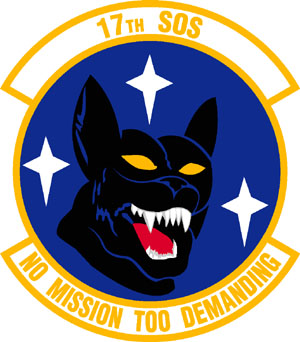
- 17th Special Operations Squadron emblem (Note: Approved 19 July 1993. Description: Azure, a Jackal head couped and traversed Sable, garnished of the first [color], langued Gules, armed Argent, and eyed Yellow between three mullets of four points White, all within a diminished bordure Or. Endicott, p. 455.)

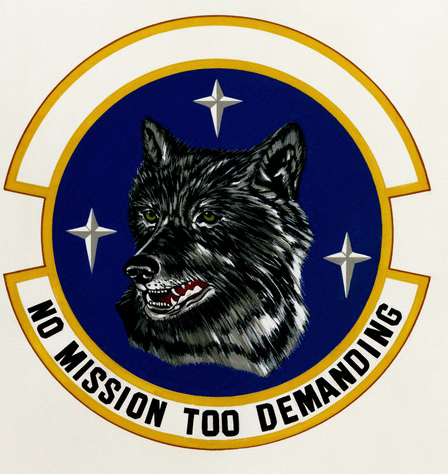
- 17th Special Operations Squadron emblem (Note: Approved 28 June 1990.)

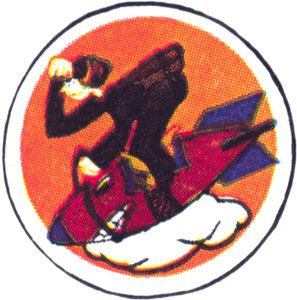
- 17th Reconnaissance Squadron (Bombardment) emblem (Note: Approved 4 May 1943. Description: On an orange disc, thin border black, piped white, a caricatured figure in aviator's suit and helmet brown, wearing ear phones and tan parachute pack, grasping in left hand reins to mouth of shark teeth, and gazing into the distance under shade of right hand, standing in stirrups of yellow saddle with blue saddle cloth and brown belly band attached about the middle of a large, red aerial bomb, trimmed blue, having shark's teeth and eye of white painted thereon, all in front of a white cloud formation in base.)

The 17th Special Operations Squadron (17 SOS) is an active unit of the United States Air Force, stationed at Will Rogers Air National Guard Base. It is an active duty squadron with a classically associated Air National Guard detachment from the 137th Special Operations Wing. The squadron operates OA-1K aircraft and is a geographically separated unit assigned to the 492nd Special Operations Wing at Hurlburt Field, Florida. The squadron was previously assigned to the 27th Special Operations Group at Cannon Air Force Base, New Mexico.

The squadron traces its lineage back to the 17th Observation Squadron, constituted and activated in 1942 during World War II. After being redesignated as the 17th Reconnaissance Squadron (Bombardment), the squadron flew North American B-25 Mitchells in the New Guinea campaign, the Philippines Campaign, and over Japan on armed reconnaissance missions. The 17th was inactivated after the end of the war. The squadron's second predecessor was activated and inactivated unmanned as the 17th Liaison Squadron in the early 1950s. The 17th Special Operations Squadron was activated in 1969 to provide AC-119G Shadow gunship air support during the Vietnam War. It was inactivated in 1971 with the drawdown of United States forces in Vietnam. During the 1980s the 17th Reconnaissance Squadron (Bombardment), 17th Liaison Squadron, and the 17th Special Operations Squadron were consolidated as the 17th Special Operations Squadron, and it was activated in 1989 in Kadena, flying the MC-130P. The squadron moved to Cannon Air Force Base in 2021. It was unmanned from2023 until July 2024 when it moved to Will Rogers Air National Guard Base, under the 492nd Special Operations Wing, flying the OA-1K Skyraider II.

== Mission ==
The 17 SOS is the formal training unit for the OA-1K, training Air Force pilots and Weapon systems officer (WSO) to fly close air support, armed ISR, and other special operations missions. Aircrew are specially trained to operate out of austere, unimproved surfaces day or night, and flying using night vision goggles.

== History ==
=== World War II ===
The 17th Observation Squadron (Light) was constituted on 5 February 1942 and activated on 2 March 1942 at Providence, Rhode Island with Air Force Combat Command. On the same day the squadron moved to Salinas Army Air Base, California, joining the 71st Observation Group there. It was equipped with Stinson L-1 Vigilant, Douglas O-46, North American O-47, and Curtiss O-52 Owl light observation aircraft. From around May to around September it flew antisubmarine patrols off west coast of the United States. On 4 July, the squadron was redesignated the 17th Observation Squadron. Between 1942 and 1943 the 17th was reequipped with Douglas A-20 Havoc, Bell P-39 Airacobra and the Curtiss P-40 Warhawk. On 24 January it was moved to Esler Field, Louisiana. The 17th was relocated to Laurel Army Air Field, Mississippi, on 31 March, where it was redesignated as the 17th Reconnaissance Squadron (Bombardment) and began training on the North American B-25 Mitchell medium bomber, in preparation for combat in the South-West Pacific Area.

After completing its training, the 17th Reconnaissance Squadron was sent to Milne Bay in New Guinea, where it arrived on 6 November. It moved forward to Dobodura Airfield on 22 November, flying its first combat mission on 28 January 1944. The 17th flew armed reconnaissance missions, conducting long range and photo reconnaissance while attacking targets of opportunity. It inflicted damage on Japanese shipping in the Bismarck Sea and the Solomon Sea, destroying several ships. On 23 February, three B-25s from the squadron flew unopposed at low altitude for 90 minutes over Manus Island and Los Negros Island, checking for the presence of Japanese troops and finding no signs of activity, concluding erroneously that the islands had been evacuated. On 27 February, when the Battle of Los Negros began with an Allied landing on that island, three B-25s from the squadron sortied to provide a smoke screen for the invasion beaches if required, but were not used due to cloud cover.

The squadron moved up to Finschhafen in March, remaining there until 30 June. Aerial reconnaissance photographs taken by the squadron provided the information for a 28 March strike by planes from the planes from the 70th Fighter Squadron on the main Japanese seaplane base in the Solomon Islands in the Tuha Channel between Shortland Island and Poporang Island, which claimed eight float planes and a destroyer. The squadron conducted daily search missions along the coast from Finschhafen to Geelvink Bay, blockading the port of Hollandia and inflicting heavy losses on its shipping along with other Allied air and naval assets. In April, the 17th sank three "sea trucks" (small wooden cargo ships). On 7 April, it cooperated with a PT boat raid against Karkar Island. Following two days of bad weather, twelve B-25s from the 17th Squadron successfully dropped food and supplies to the 21st Infantry, who had made the main landing at Hollandia, at Dazai on 26 April. On 28 April, twelve B-25s of the 17th attacked coastal targets between Sarmi and Sawar. The squadron's aerial photography during that week revealed that the Sarmi area was too heavily manned by Japanese to build an airfield there.

Its air echelon was moved up to Wakde on 25 May to provide air cover for the invasion of Biak, leaving the ground crews behind at Finschhafen. On 27 May, when the invasion of Biak began, four B-25s from the squadron provided the first air cover for the invasion troops shortly after first light. The 17th's aircraft provided direct air support to the troops on Biak when called upon, but were endangered by trigger-happy friendly anti-aircraft gunners. On 28 May, a B-25 from the squadron that was cleared to drop pictures on the beachhead was shot down by friendly fire. The Japanese began attempted to send a reinforcement convoy of troop-laden destroyers to Biak on 8 June after an air raid on Wakde on the night of 5–6 June damaged many Allied aircraft, leaving the 17th Squadron the only aviation unit available to intercept the first convoy. Ten B-25s from the squadron led by squadron commander Major William G. Tennille Jr., spotted the convoy, which they reported to consist of two cruisers and four destroyers, at 1250 hours near Amsterdam Island. Two larger destroyers were misidentified as cruisers. The squadron made a low-level attack, sinking the destroyer Harusame and damaging three other ships. Three aircraft, including Tennille's plane, were shot down, and the remainder were so badly damaged by anti-aircraft fire that the entire 17th Reconnaissance air echelon was sent back to Finschhafen two days later to reform. Tennille and Lieutenant Howard Wood posthumously received the Distinguished Service Cross for their actions.

On 27 June the replenished air echelon began moving to recently captured Mokmer Airfield on Biak, completing the move by 2 July. It was joined by the ground echelon after 30 June. On 2 July, the squadron sent three missions of B-25s to provide air support to the invasion troops in the Battle of Noemfoor, bombing and strafing Japanese positions. On 20 August, the squadron's B-25s conducted low level photography over the Talaud Islands, covered by a bombing raid from the 345th Bombardment Group. The 17th was originally planned to relocated to Morotai after the capture of its airfields in October, but the move was cancelled so that it could prepare for relocation to Tacloban on Leyte after the Allied landings on that island.

On 2 November its ground echelon landed at Tacloban, although the air echelon remained primarily at Biak until 23 December, when it was flown into Elmore Field at San Jose on Mindoro. The 17th Reconnaissance flew reconnaissance missions over Luzon, providing Allied forces with intelligence on Japanese positions, troop movements, and supply routes. Crews from the squadron bombed Japanese airfields in Formosa and China. On 30 December, the 17th and 110th Reconnaissance Squadron cooperated with the 675th Bombardment Squadron to attack a Japanese convoy off northwest Luzon, sinking a frigate and three cargo vessels. At Elmore the squadron's operations were limited by a crew shortage, which prompted Fifth Air Force commander Major General Ennis Whitehead to request crews from Far East Air Forces (FEAF) on 1 January 1945. In the first week of January, the FEAF Combat Replacement and Training Center sent the needed B-25 crews to the squadron. The ground echelon arrived at Elmore on 7 January.

On 4 April, the 17th moved to Lingayen in northern Luzon as the advance through the Philippines continued. On 29 July, the squadron moved to Ie Shima, leaving a detachment behind at Lingayen until September. It flew reconnaissance missions over Japan to assess the results of Allied bombing raids, locate prisoner of war camps, and photograph Japanese troop positions. The squadron flew its last combat mission on 25 July 1945.

=== Postwar ===
Around 21 October, the squadron was attached to the 91st Reconnaissance Wing, and it moved to Yokota Air Base on 26 October. It was attached to V Bomber Command on 10 November. The 17th was permanently assigned to V Bomber Command on 1 February 1946, and was inactivated at Yokota on 27 April.

The 17th Liaison Squadron was constituted on 19 September 1952 and activated unmanned at McChord Air Force Base on 20 October 1952. It was part of the Western Air Defense Force and was inactivated on 25 September 1953.

=== Vietnam War ===
The 17th Special Operations Squadron (17 SOS) was constituted on 11 April 1969 and activated on 1 June, at Nha Trang Air Base during the Vietnam War with the 14th Special Operations Wing. It was equipped with Fairchild AC-119G Shadow gunships and replaced the 71st Special Operations Squadron, which relocated to the United States for inactivation. The 17th absorbed around two-thirds of the 71st personnel, with the remainder being reservists who were transferred to inactive status days after their return to the United States. By the end of June, the squadron, commanded by Lieutenant Colonel Richard E. Knie, had trained replacements and begun routine operations. At the end of the year, it was divided into three flights, operating from different bases: A Flight with four aircraft at Tuy Hoa Air Base, B Flight with seven at Phan Rang Air Base, and C Flight at Tan Son Nhut Air Base.

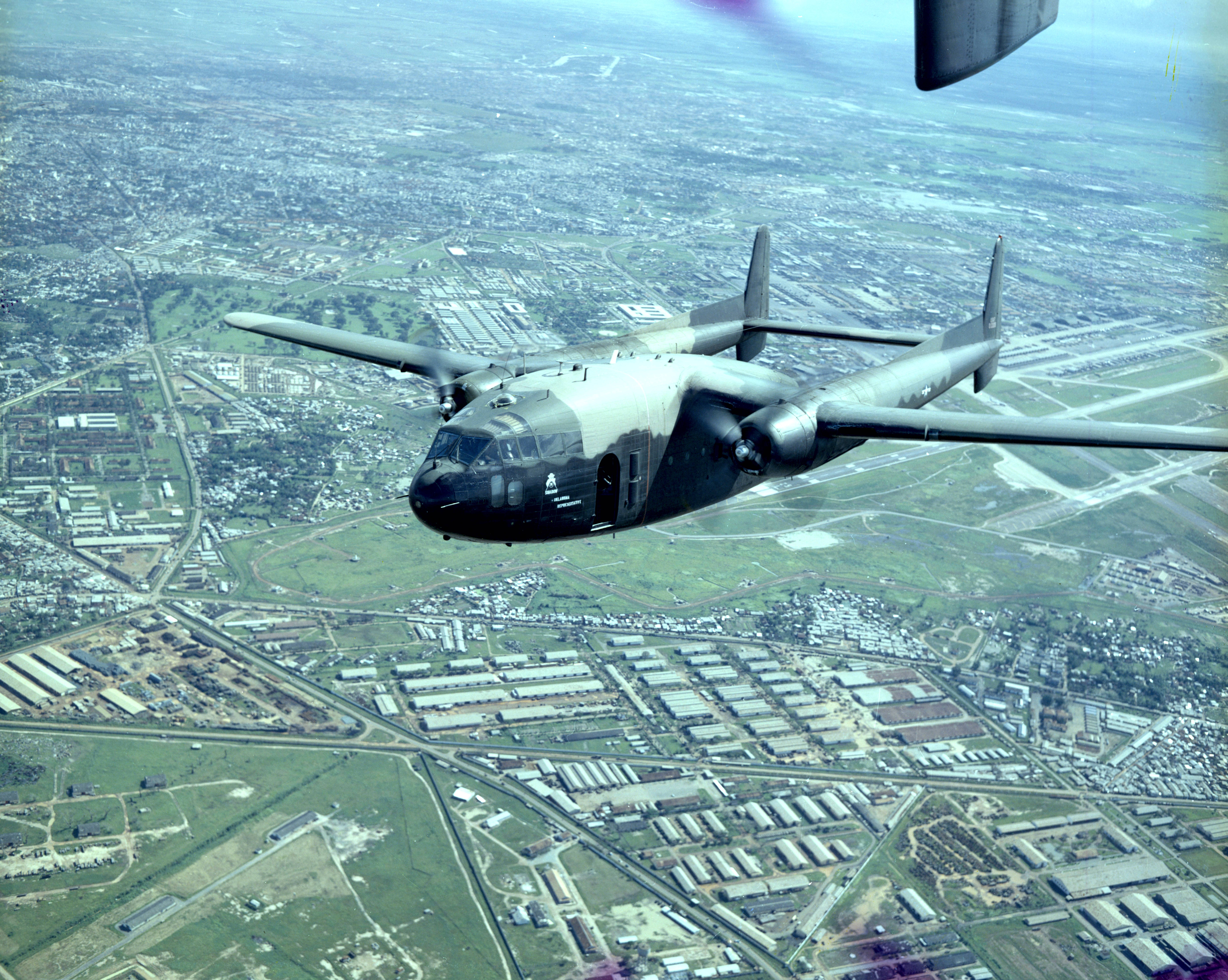
An AC-119G of the 17th SOS over Tan Son Nhut Air Base, 29 October 1969

AC-119 crews from the squadron provided air base defense, close air support, and armed reconnaissance. Four gunships were damaged in combat and on 6 August another was hit by .50 caliber rounds in the fuselage and an engine, causing an engine fire and extensive damage. The 17th's main support base was relocated to Phan Rang Air Base on 15 August. Due to the pressure on aircraft maintenance, the squadron put in relief from at least one Shadow mission per night in the last half of August. The maintenance situation was aggravated by corrosion-control work, maintenance inspections, and part supply disruptions due to unit movements. On 11 October, Shadow 76 was destroyed and six crewmembers killed when it crashed upon takeoff for a mission from Tan Son Nhut, the squadron's first aircraft loss. Another gunship was severely damaged on 10 November when its right landing gear collapsed on landing at Chu Lai Air Base.

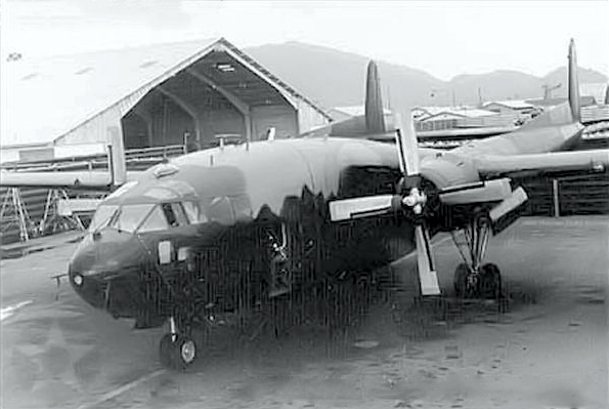
An AC-119G of the squadron at Nha Trang, 1969

A decrease in the number of missions, a decline in enemy activity, and worsening weather slightly changed the "seek and destroy" gunship concept of the first half of the year to a "combat air patrol" role. By mid-December most of the problems of the squadron had been eased, improving the squadron's situation. During its first six months of operations, the squadron's crews flew 2,000 sorties and 8,000 combat hours, fired 20 million rounds of ammunition, expended 12,000 flares, killed 800 enemy, destroyed 150 sampans, and recorded 800 secondary explosions despite aircraft corrosion and equipment issues, reorganization, and retraining of aircrew and support personnel. No outpost was overrun while it was being supported by the gunships.

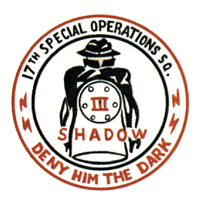
Unofficial squadron emblem painted on squadron headquarters at Phan Rang

In early 1970, enemy action declined so much that more mission were directed to border areas with more interdiction targets. The gunships conducted nighttime armed reconnaissance in specific strike zones known as Shadow boxes, flying a TACAN radial to a location in the box, then dropping position markers and locating targets. Between 1 April and 22 May, the 17 SOS provided nighttime cover for the besieged CIDG camps at Dak Seang and Dak Pek. With the assistance of AC-119K Stingers from the 18th Special Operations Squadron, the Shadows flew one to two sorties a night. During the siege of the camps, the squadrons flew 147 sorties and expended 2,380,161 7.62mm rounds and 21,796 20mm rounds. They also illuminated drop zones for C-7A Caribous resupplying the camps. From 3 April to 31 May, the AC-119Gs based at Tan Son Nhut tested a portable UHF receiver for signals transmitted by ground sensors. On 18 April, Shadow 77 picked up signals in a sensor field, firing nearly 6,000 7.62mm rounds that night and 28,500 rounds on the next night after again detecting movement, as well as assisting an airstrike in the area. 150 enemy bodies were discovered and 17 prisoners captured along with nine crew-served weapons and 67 individual weapons in a subsequent ground sweep. After the conclusion of the testing period, the final assessment recommended that the receivers be permanently placed in the AC-119.

A Flight was relocated to Phù Cát Air Base on 12 April, taking over the 18 SOS facilities there. On 28 April, a squadron AC-119G, Shadow 78, crashed on takeoff from Tan Son Nhut after an engine failure, killing six of the eight crewmembers. From 5 May 1970, the squadron began flying in the Cambodian Campaign after United States forces moved into Cambodia to prop up the Cambodian Army and capture North Vietnamese base camps, and its air support was credited with lifting the siege of Kampong Thom. The 17th's crews flew 32 missions in three days at Kampong Thom and expanded over 500,000 7.62mm rounds during the campaign. Although the ground campaign ended on 30 June, the gunships continued to provide air support to the Cambodian Army and on 1 August the gunships began daytime air interdiction due to the lack of effective enemy antiaircraft fire in the country.

Between 10 October and 27 November, the squadron moved more aircraft to Tan Son Nhut from Phan Rang and Phù Cát due to operational needs in Cambodia. On 7 December, the 17 SOS was ordered to fly night support missions for Laotian forces on the Bolaven Plateau after several Lima Sites were surrounded by enemy forces. Three gunships and four crews were relocated from Phan Rang to Phù Cát, and air support enabled the Lima Sites to reset defenses in around five days. Between 12 and 15 December, 32 squadron missions expended 555,800 7.62mm rounds and 128 flares in support of the Cambodian Army defense of Prey Totung. On 29 December, A Flight was inactivated at Phù Cát, and its personnel and equipment transferred to B Flight at Phan Rang. At the end of the year, B Flight at Phan Rang had seven gunships and C Flight at Tan Son Nhut had nine gunships.

As a result of the Vietnamization policy, the squadron began training Republic of Vietnam Air Force pilots on the gunships in early 1971, and turned over its aircraft to the 819th Combat Squadron on 24 September 1971. The squadron was inactivated days later on 30 September.

=== Kadena Special Operations Squadron ===
On 19 September 1985, the lineages of the 17th Reconnaissance Squadron, 17th Liaison Squadron, and the 17th Special Operations Squadron were consolidated as the 17th Special Operations Squadron, although the unit remained inactive. The 17 SOS was reactivated on 1 August 1989, part of the 353d Special Operations Wing (later the 353d Special Operations Group) at Kadena Air Base, equipped with Lockheed HC-130P/N Combat Shadow search and rescue transport (later redesignated the MC-130P/N to reflect its special operations role).

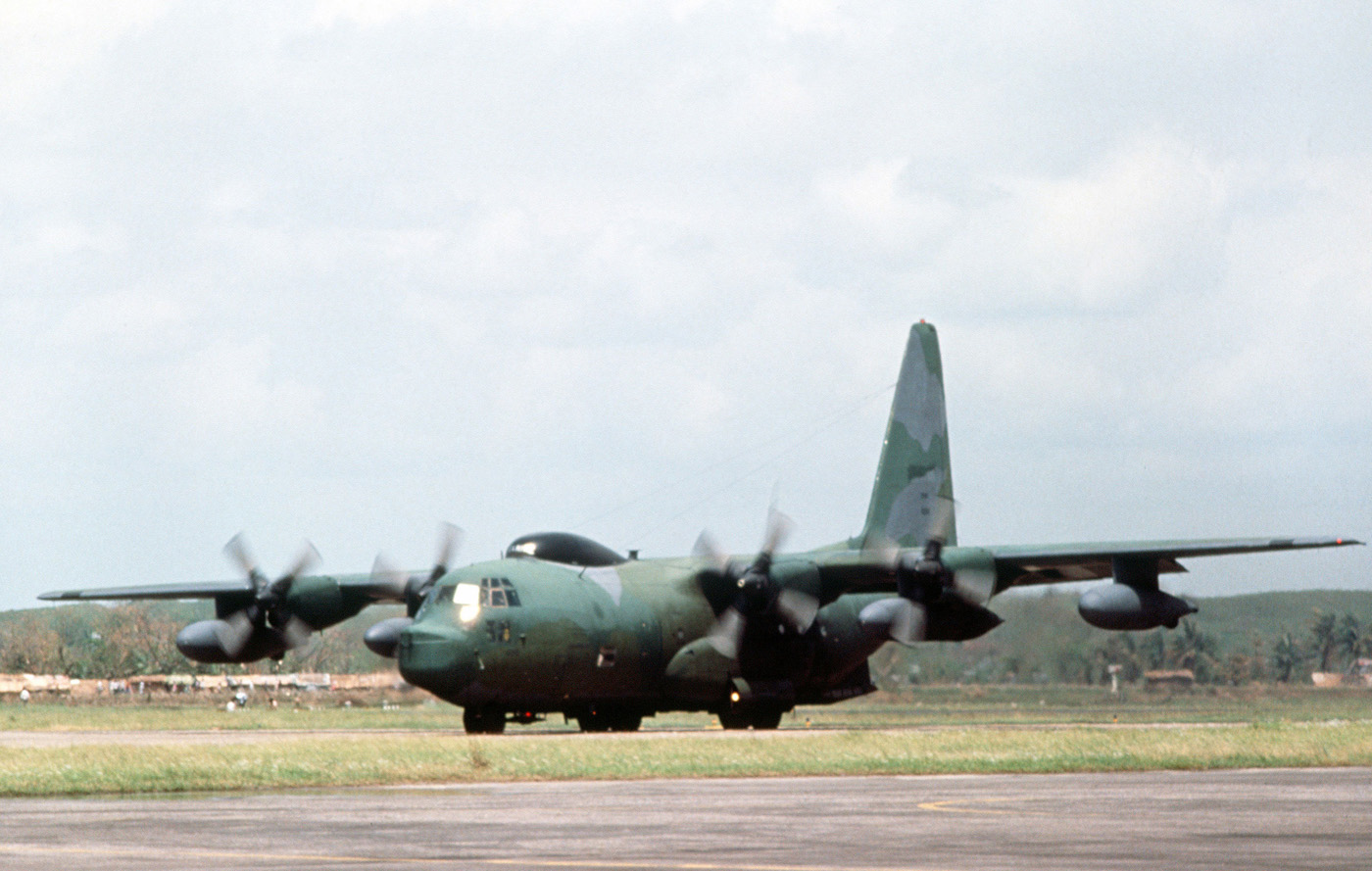
An HC-130 taxiing on the runway at Chittagong, 30 April 1991 after arrival to support Operation Sea Angel

Since then, the squadron has provided covert aerial refueling for special operations helicopters and infiltrated, exfiltrated, and resupplied special operations forces. From 16 to 31 July 1990, after the 1990 Luzon earthquake, the squadron's aircraft shuttled fuel between Kadena and San Fernando to Marine and Philippine Air Force helicopters participating in relief efforts after fuel shortages threatened the stoppage of the relief operations, alongside the 1st Special Operations Squadron. During the operation, the two squadrons pumped 377,000 pounds of fuel. In late April 1991, after the 1991 Bangladesh cyclone caused extensive devastation, two HC-130s were sent to transport international relief supplies to Chittagong in Operation Sea Angel, where the supplies were transferred to helicopters for the journey inland. By early June the aircraft had returned to Kadena after the conclusion of the operation.

In late June, after Clark Air Base was closed by the Mount Pinatubo eruption, the squadron commander helped establish a temporary beddown location for the 353d Wing at Kadena. On 2 July, the squadron provided a HC-130 escort for a Lockheed C-5 Galaxy transporting a Sikorsky MH-53 from the 31st Special Operations Squadron relocating from Clark Air Base to Futenma. During the summer and fall of 1992, the squadron was scheduled to convert to the Lockheed MC-130H Combat Talon II. Due to lack of spares and test equipment, its conversion was postponed to the summer of 1995. In February 1993, the 17th SOS was grounded for ten days due to a flying hours reduction caused by budget issues. In January 1994, under the Commando Vision plan, it was decided that the squadron would not convert to the Combat Talon and would instead retain its Combat Shadows.

In 1994, it deployed crews to the Middle East for Operation Provide Comfort, augmenting personnel at Incirlik Air Base. Six months later, the squadron deployed to Dhahran for Operation Southern Watch. In 1995, the 17th sent an aircraft to participate in Exercise Teak Iroquois 95–4, the first military-to-military exercises with the Indian Air Force. In December 1996, the 17th deployed a Combat Shadow crew to San Vito Air Station in support of Operation Joint Guard in the Kosovo War. This was the first time that a crew from the squadron flew combat hours since Vietnam.

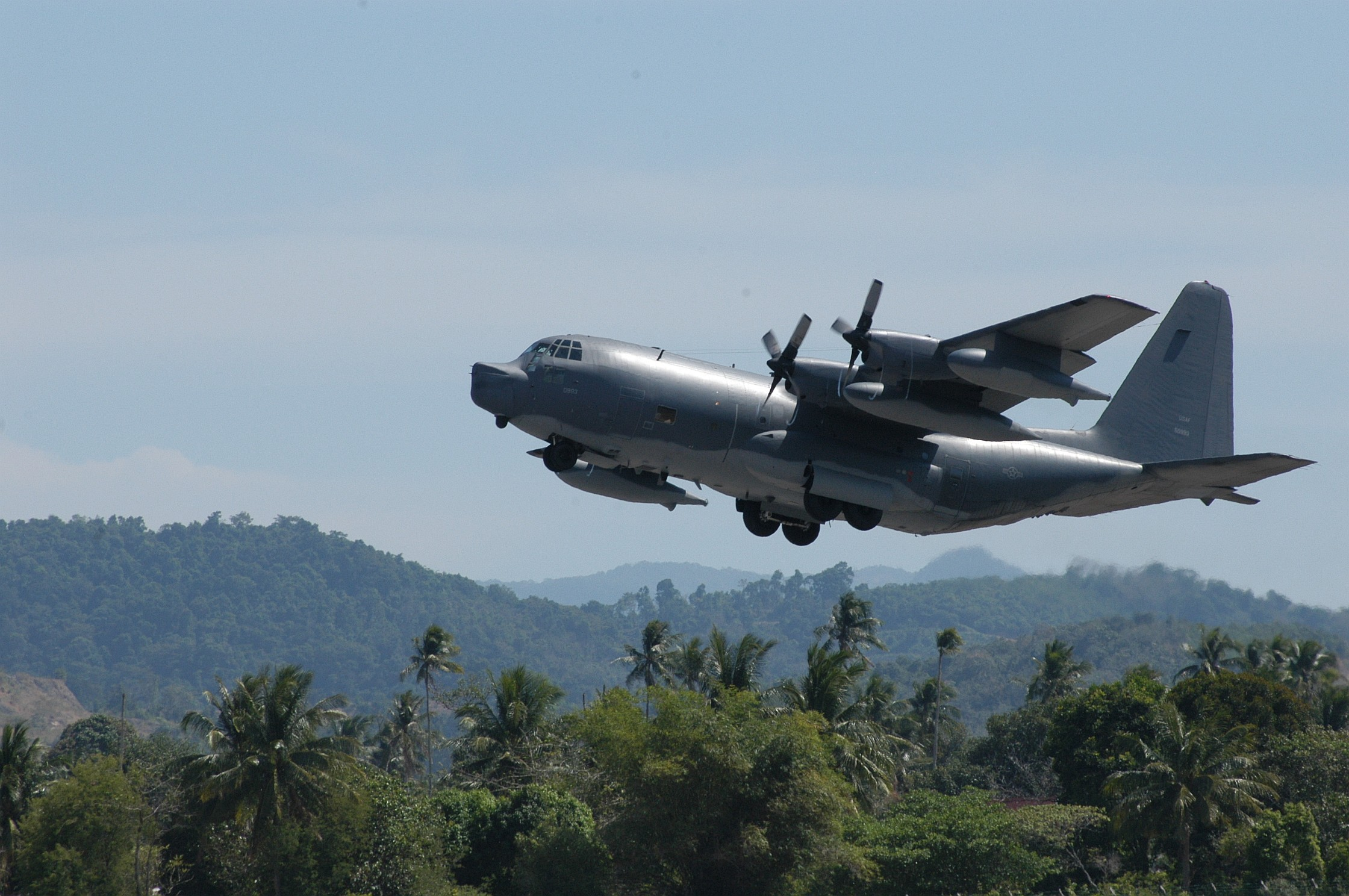
A Combat Shadow taking off from Langkawi in support of Operation Unified Assistance, January 2005

On 26 December 2004, the 2004 Indian Ocean earthquake and tsunami caused widespread destruction in the region. The squadron deployed aircraft and personnel to Bangkok in order to aid relief efforts in Operation Unified Assistance. After the 2011 Tōhoku earthquake and tsunami on 11 March of that year, the squadron deployed to Yokota Air Base to support the relief effort in Operation Tomodachi, returning to Kadena in early April. The squadron supported Operation Damayan, the relief effort in the Philippines after Typhoon Haiyan in November 2013. In December 2014, the squadron began reequipping with the more advanced Lockheed MC-130J Commando II, replacing its Combat Shadows.

=== Cannon Air Force Base AC-130J Operations Squadron ===
In October 2021, the squadron was activated at Cannon Air Force Base, New Mexico, where it was assigned to fly the AC-130J Ghostrider as part of the 27th Special Operations Group, 27th Special Operations Wing. On 2 October 2023, the squadron personnel consolidated into the 16th Special Operations Squadron and the unit became temporarily unfunded and unmanned while awaiting reassignment.

=== Will Rogers Air National Guard Base OA-1K Skyraider II Training Squadron ===
On 11 July 2024, the squadron was relocated to Will Rogers Air National Guard Base, reassigned to the 492nd Special Operations Wing, and changed its mission to become the Air Force's formal training unit (FTU) for the OA-1K. Personnel and aircraft arrived later in July, and it started flying operations in August in partially modified AT-802U aircraft.

== Lineage ==
17th Reconnaissance Squadron

- Constituted as the 17th Observation Squadron (Light) on 5 February 1942

Activated on 2 March 1942
Redesignated 17th Observation Squadron on 4 July 1942
Redesignated 17th Reconnaissance Squadron (Bombardment) on 2 April 1943
Inactivated on 27 April 1946

- Consolidated with the 17th Liaison Squadron and the 17th Special Operations Squadron as the 17th Special Operations Squadron on 19 September 1985

17th Liaison Squadron

- Constituted as the 17th Liaison Squadron on 19 September 1952

Activated on 20 October 1952
Inactivated on 25 September 1953
Consolidated with the 17th Reconnaissance Squadron and the 17th Special Operations Squadron as the 17th Special Operations Squadron on 19 September 1985

17th Special Operations Squadron

- Constituted as the 17th Special Operations Squadron on 11 April 1969

Activated on 1 June 1969
Inactivated on 30 September 1971
Consolidated with the 17th Reconnaissance Squadron and the 17th Liaison Squadron on 19 September 1985 (remained inactive)
Activated on 1 August 1989

=== Assignments ===
- 71st Observation Group (later 71st Reconnaissance Group, 71st Tactical Reconnaissance Group): 2 March 1942 (attached to 91st Reconnaissance Wing c. 21 October – 9 November 1945, V Bomber Command 10 November 1945 – 31 January 1946)
- V Bomber Command: 1 February 1946 – 27 April 1946
- Western Air Defense Force: 20 October 1952 – 25 September 1953
- 14th Special Operations Wing: 1 June 1969 – 30 September 1971
- 353rd Special Operations Wing (later 353rd Special Operations Group): 1 August 1989
- 27th Special Operations Group: 6 July 2021
- 492nd Special Operations Group: 11 July 2024
- 492nd Special Operations Wing: 1 November 2024 – present

=== Stations ===
- Providence, Rhode Island, 2 March 1942
- Salinas Army Air Base, California, 2 March 1942
- Esler Field, Louisiana, 24 January 1943
- Laurel Army Air Field, Mississippi, 31 March 1943 – 24 September 1943
- Milne Bay, New Guinea, 6 November 1943
- Dobodura, New Guinea, 22 November 1943
- Finschhafen, New Guinea, March 1944 – 30 June 1944 (air echelon at Wakde, New Guinea 25 May 1944 – 10 June 1944 and at Biak, New Guinea after 27 June 1944)
- Biak, New Guinea, 29 July 1944
- Tacloban, Philippines, 2 November 1944 (air echelon primarily at Biak, New Guinea until c. 23 December 1944, then at San Jose, Philippines
- San Jose, Philippines, 7 January 1945
- Lingayen, Philippines, 4 April 1945
- Ie Shima, Japan, 29 July 1945 (detachment remained at Lingayen until September 1945))
- Yokota Air Base, Japan, 26 October 1945 – 27 April 1946)
- McChord Air Force Base, Washington, 20 October 1952 – 24 September 1953
- Nha Trang Air Base, South Vietnam, 1 June 1969
- Phan Rang Air Base, South Vietnam. 15 August 1969 – 30 September 1971
- Kadena Air Base, Japan, 1 August 1989 – 6 July 2021
- Cannon Air Force Base, New Mexico, 6 July 2021 – 11 Jul 2024
- Will Rogers Air National Guard Base, Oklahoma, 11 July 2024 – Present

=== Unit awards and campaigns ===
Award streamer	Award	Dates	Notes
	Distinguished Unit Citation	8 June 1944	Dutch New Guinea, 17th Reconnaissance Squadron
	Distinguished Unit Citations	26 December 1944	Philippine Islands, 17th Reconnaissance Squadrons
	Air Force Outstanding Unit Award with Combat "V" Device	1 July 1970-1 June 1971	17th Special Operations Squadron
	Air Force Outstanding Unit Award w/ "V" Device	2 September 2004-1 September 2006	17th Special Operations Squadron
	Air Force Meritorious Unit Award	1 October 2010-30 September 2012	17th Special Operations Squadron
	Air Force Meritorious Unit Award	1 October 2012-30 September 2014	17th Special Operations Squadron
	Air Force Meritorious Unit Award	1 October 2018-1 April 2020	17th Special Operations Squadron
	Air Force Meritorious Unit Award	1 October 2021-30 September 2023	17th Special Operations Squadron
	Air Force Outstanding Unit Award	1 August 1989-5 April 1991	17th Special Operations Squadron
	Air Force Outstanding Unit Award	1 June 1993-31 May 1995	
	Air Force Outstanding Unit Award	1 September 1995-31 August 1997	17th Special Operations Squadron
	Air Force Outstanding Unit Award	16 October 1998-31 May 2000	17th Special Operations Squadron
	Air Force Outstanding Unit Award	13 October 2000-30 September 2002	17th Special Operations Squadron
	Air Force Outstanding Unit Award	2 September 2002-1 September 2004	17th Special Operations Squadron
	Air Force Outstanding Unit Award	1 October 2008-30 September 2010	17th Special Operations Squadron
	Air Force Outstanding Unit Award	1 October 2014-30 September 2016	17th Special Operations Squadron
	Air Force Outstanding Unit Award	1 October 2016-30 September 2018	17th Special Operations Squadron
	Philippine Republic Presidential Unit Citation	17 October 1944-4 July 1945	17th Special Operations Squadron
	Vietnamese Gallantry Cross with Palm	1 June 1969-30 September 1971	17th Special Operations Squadron

Campaign Streamer	Campaign	Dates	Notes
	Antisubmarine	May 1942–September 1942	17th Observation Squadron
	Air Offensive, Japan	6 November 1943–2 September 1945	17th Reconnaissance Squadron
	China Defensive	6 November 1943–4 May 1945	17th Reconnaissance Squadron
	New Guinea	6 November 1943–31 December 1944	17th Reconnaissance Squadron
	Bismarck Archipelago	15 December 1943–27 November 1944	17th Reconnaissance Squadron
	Leyte	17 October 1944–1 July 1945	17th Reconnaissance Squadron
	Luzon	15 December 1944–4 July 1945	17th Reconnaissance Squadron
	Southern Philippines	27 February 1945–4 July 1945	17th Reconnaissance Squadron
	Ryukus	26 March 1945–2 July 1945	17th Reconnaissance Squadron
	Western Pacific	17 April 1945–2 September 1945	17th Reconnaissance Squadron
	China Offensive	5 May 1945–2 September 1945	17th Reconnaissance Squadron
	Tet 1969/Counteroffensive	1 June 1969–8 June 1969	17th Special Operations Squadron
	Vietnam Summer-Fall 1969	9 June 1969–31 October 1969	17th Special Operations Squadron
	Vietnam Winter-Spring 1970	3 November 1969–30 April 1970	17th Special Operations Squadron
	Sanctuary Counteroffensive	1 May 1970–30 June 1970	17th Special Operations Squadron
	Southwest Monsoon	1 July 1970–30 November 1970	17th Special Operations Squadron
	Commando Hunt V	1 December 1970–14 May 1971	17th Special Operations Squadron
	Commando Hunt VI	15 May 1971–31 July 1971	17th Special Operations Squadron

=== Aircraft ===
- Stinson L-1 Vigilant (1942)
- Douglas O-46 (1942)
- North American O-47 (1942)
- Curtiss O-52 Owl (1942)
- Douglas A-20 Havoc (1942–1943)
- Bell P-39 Airacobra (1942–1943)
- Curtiss P-40 Warhawk (1942–1943)
- North American B-25 Mitchell (1943–1946)
- Fairchild AC-119 Shadow (1969–1971)
- Lockheed MC-130P Combat Shadow (1989–2014)
- Lockheed MC-130J Commando II (2014–unknown)
- Lockheed AC-130J Ghostrider (2021–2023)
- L3Harris OA-1K Skyraider II (2024–present)
