= Fairchild AC-119 =

American aerial gunship

AC-119G Shadow AC-119K Stinger
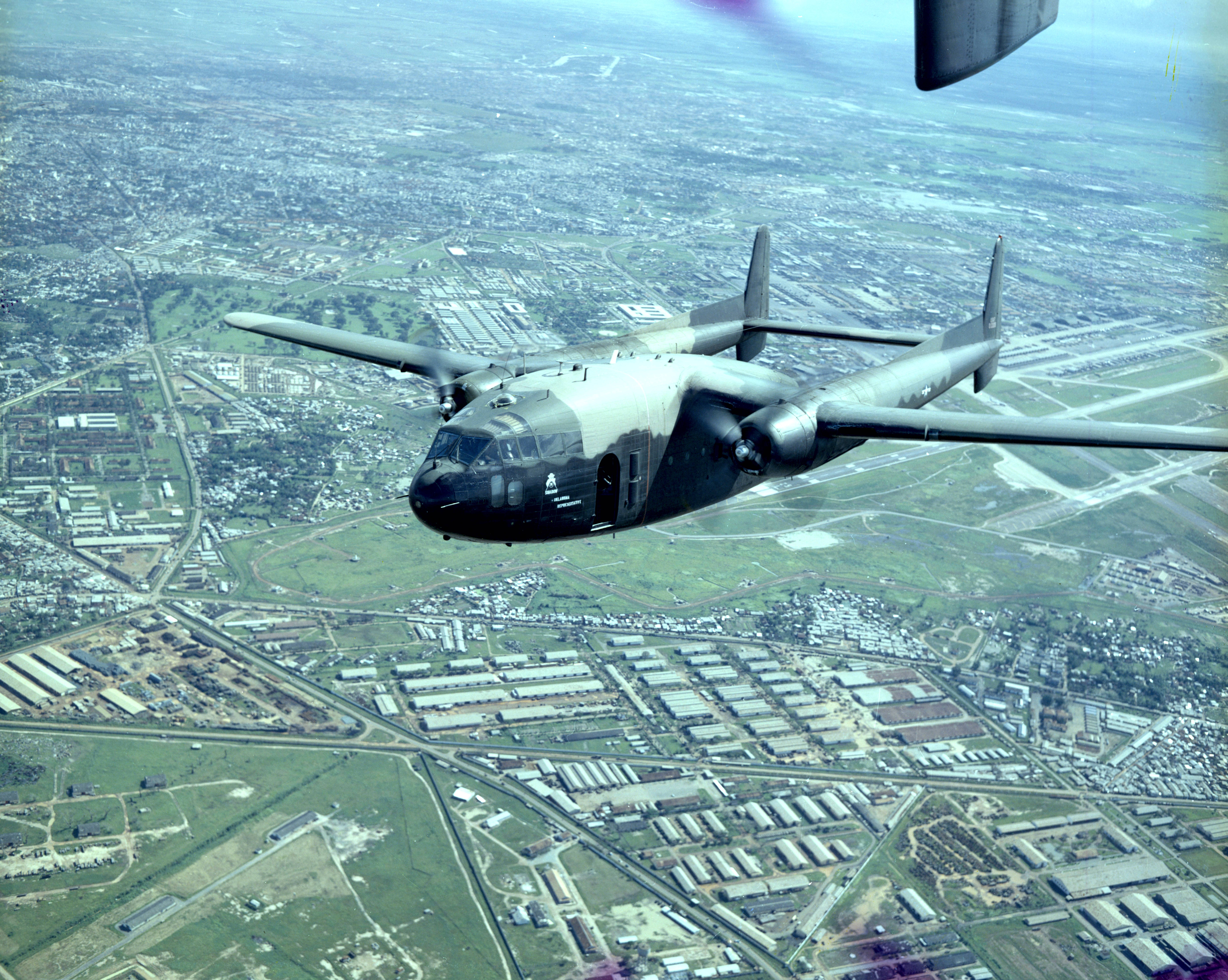
- An AC-119G gunship over Tan Son Nhut Air Base

General information
- Type: Ground-attack aircraft and close air support gunship
- Manufacturer: Fairchild Aircraft
- Primary users: United States Air Force Republic of Vietnam Air Force
- Number built: 52

History
- Introduction date: November 1968
- Retired: USAF: 1971; Republic of Vietnam Air Force: 1975
- Developed from: Fairchild C-119 Flying Boxcar

The Fairchild AC-119G Shadow and AC-119K Stinger were twin-engine piston-powered gunships developed by the United States during the Vietnam War. They replaced the Douglas AC-47 Spooky and operated alongside the early versions of the AC-130 Spectre gunship.

== Design and development ==
By late 1967, the idea of the fixed-wing gunship had been proven so successful, the United States Air Force was having a difficult time keeping up with demand. The newer AC-130s that had been created under Project Gunship II were effective, but were being mostly used for armed reconnaissance and interdiction of the Ho Chi Minh Trail. Furthermore, the C-130 airframe was in active service as a transport, vital to the war effort in Southeast Asia. The Air Force desperately needed a new gunship to replace the vulnerable and underpowered AC-47 in the close air support role, as well as supplementing the AC-130 in attacking targets on the Ho Chi Minh Trail.

The Fairchild C-119 Flying Boxcar presented an obvious choice, having been phased out of front-line service in favor of the C-123 and C-130, and with the stock of available airframes in U.S. Air Force Reserve being sufficient. In February 1968, under the USAF program Project Gunship III, 26 C-119Gs were converted to AC-119G standard, initially taking on the name "Creep", but later assigned the callsign "Shadow".

In addition, Fairchild-Hiller, which was contracted for all the conversions, converted another 26 C-119Gs into AC-119Ks, primarily for the "truck hunter" role over the Ho Chi Minh Trail. These aircraft were called "Stingers" primarily in reference to the two M61 Vulcan 20-mm cannons they carried in addition to the AC-119G's four GAU-2/A miniguns. The AC-119K could be visually distinguished by the addition of two General Electric J85 turbojet engines in underwing pods. The conversions were completed at Fairchild-Hiller's facility in St. Augustine, Florida.

Project Gunship III, being a follow-on to the success of the AC-130 series, meant that the AC-119 was a more advanced aircraft in both its iterations than the AC-47. Even the TIC AC-119G featured some of the most up-to-date electronic countermeasures and radar equipment, as well as more basic technology, including an AVQ-8 xenon light, a night observation sight, and an LAU-74/A flare launcher.

The AC-119K, designed to hit trucks on the Ho Chi Minh Trail, was more advanced. Included in the conversion was the AN/APN-147 Doppler navigation radar, AN/AAD-4 forward looking infrared, AN/APQ-133 side-looking beacon tracking radar and AN/APQ-136 search radar.

The armament scheme for both aircraft was simpler than that of the AC-130. The AC-119G had a total of four GAU-2A/A miniguns in SUU-11A/A pods, all on mounts similar to those used on early AC-47s. Like late-model AC-47s, these were soon changed to the purpose-built MXU-470/A minigun modules. The AC-119K, needing a more powerful and longer range "punch" to take out vehicles, featured two M61 20-mm cannons in addition to the four miniguns of the AC-119G.

== Operational history ==
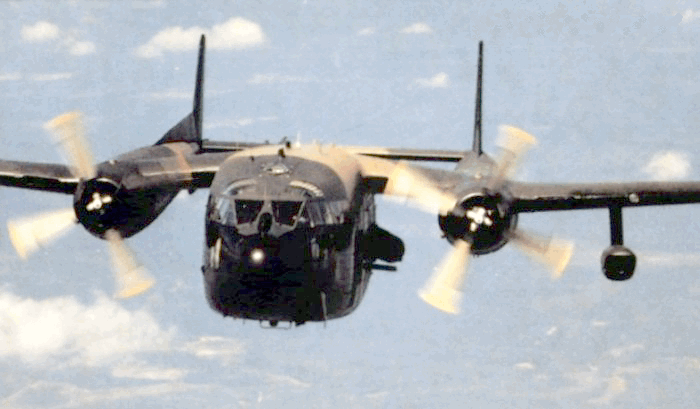
One of the J85 turbojet engines added to later models of the AC-119 is visible below the wing on the right in this photo

By November 1968, the aircraft had deployed to Vietnam and joined the 14th Special Operations Wing at Nha Trang Air Base. The AC-119Gs were placed in the 71st Special Operations Squadron which was formed from the activated 71st Troop Carrier Squadron, of the Air Force Reserve located at Bakalar Air Force Base in Columbus, Indiana. When the 71 SOS returned to continental USA in 1969, the gunships were taken over by the newly formed 17 SOS.

Earlier on November 8, the 4413th Combat Crew Training Squadron received its first AC-119K.

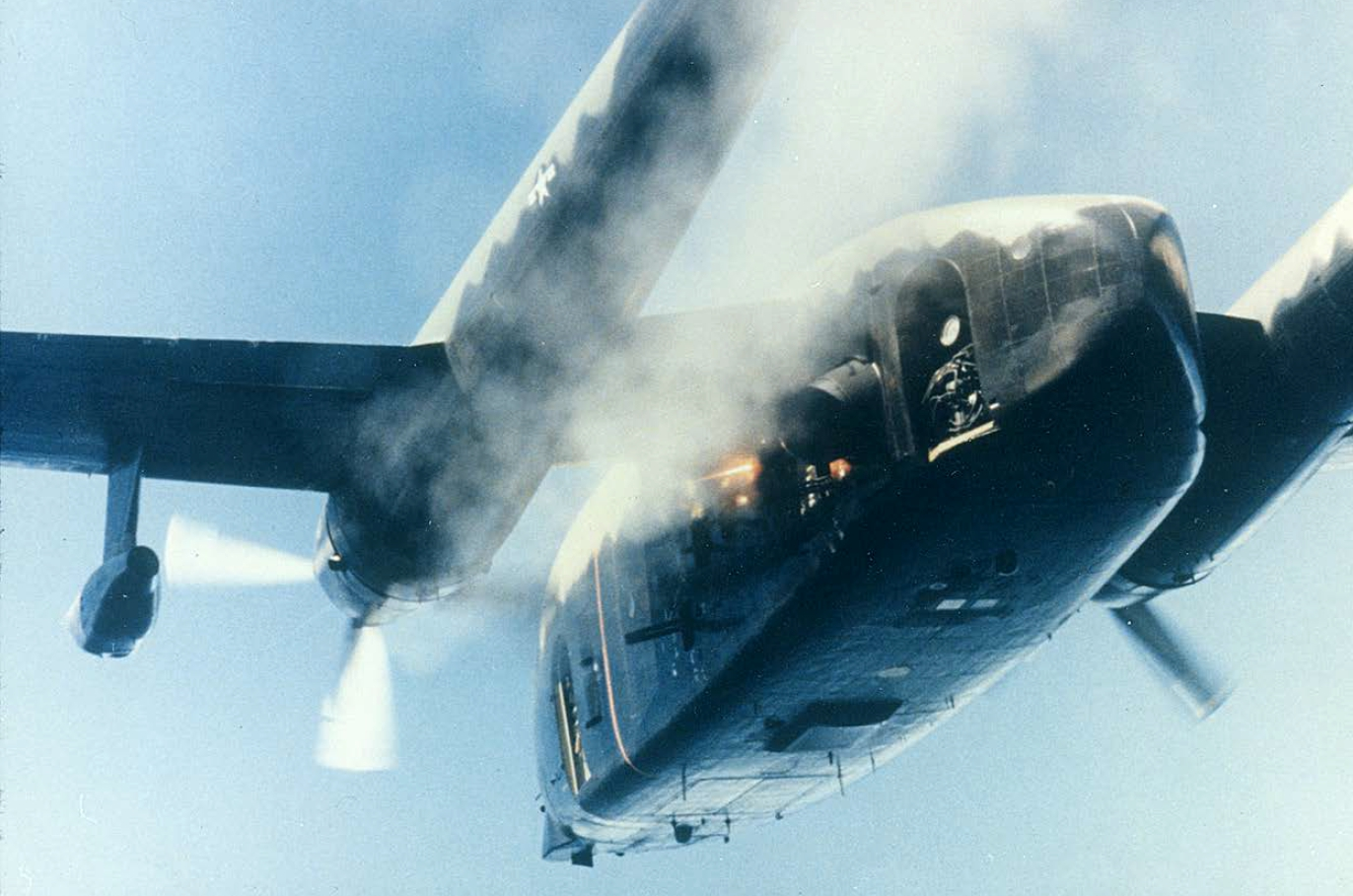
U.S. Air Force Fairchild AC-119K Stinger of the 18th Special Operations Squadron fires one of its 7.62mm miniguns, circa 1970. The AC-119 were used to attack the North Vietnamese trucks on Ho Chi Minh trail.

The AC-119Ks were placed in the 18th Special Operations Squadron. With the addition of the two types, the 14 SOW for a time in 1968 was flying eight different aircraft from ten different bases in South Vietnam. The 14 SOW was inactivated in 1971. Limited numbers continued to be operated out of Thailand as late as the fall of 1972, but the AC-119 was phased out shortly after from the US Air Force. The AC-119G and 119K continued to serve with the Republic of Vietnam Air Force until the Fall of Saigon in 1975. During the Vietnam War, only five AC-119 Gunship IIIs were lost to all causes.

== Operators ==
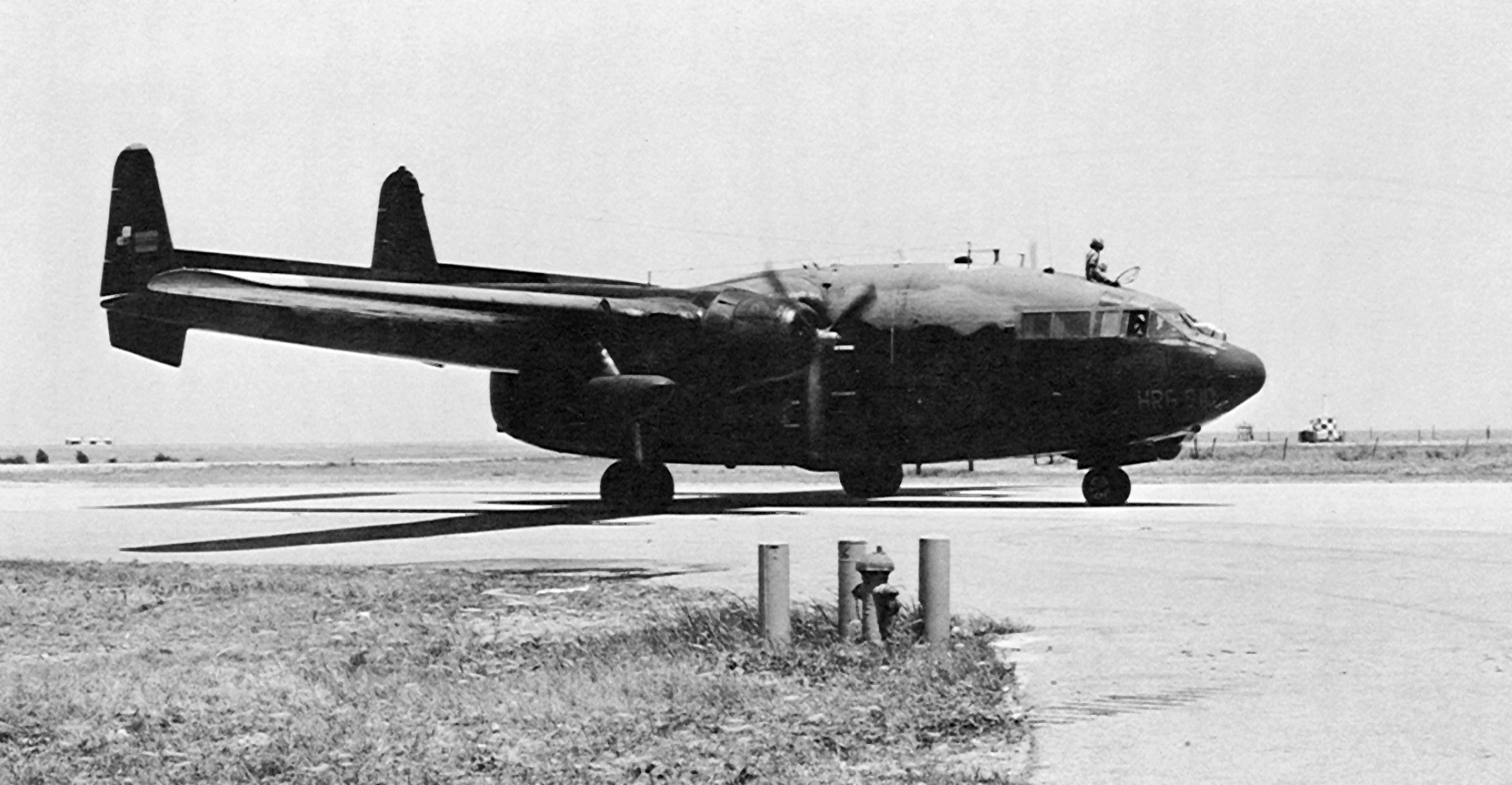
A Republic of Vietnam Air Force AC-119K, in April 1975.

South Vietnam

Republic of Vietnam Air Force 819 Attack Squadron AC-119G Shadow. 821 Attack Squadron AC-119K Stinger. Both based at Tan Son Nhut air base with detachments at other bases. Both part of the 53rd Tactical Wing, 5th Air Division.

United States

United States Air Force

- 14th Special Operations Wing – Nha Trang Air Base, South Vietnam

17th Special Operations Squadron 1969–1971
18th Special Operations Squadron 1969–1971
71st Special Operations Squadron 1968–1969
(Detachments at Tan San Nhut, Phan Rang and Phu Cat AB)

- 56th Special Operations Wing – Nakhon Phanom Air Base, Thailand

18th Special Operations Squadron 1971–1972

== Surviving example ==
- C-119L, AF Ser. No. 53-3144, is on display at the Air Commando Heritage Park at Hurlburt Field, Florida. The aircraft is displayed as an AC-119 with mock-up equipment, but never served in the role and lacks any interior equipment/components.

== Specifications (AC-119G) ==
Data from

General characteristics

- Crew: 6 (day), 8 (night)
- Length: 86 ft 5.75 in (26.3589 m)
- Wingspan: 109 ft 3.25 in (33.3058 m)
- Height: 26 ft 7.75 in (8.1217 m)
- Wing area: 1,400 sq ft (130 m^{2})
- Airfoil: root: NACA 2418; tip: NACA 4409
- Empty weight: 40,125 lb (18,200 kg)
- Max takeoff weight: 62,000 lb (28,123 kg)
- Powerplant: 2 × Wright R-3350-85 Duplex-Cyclone 18-cylinder air-cooled radial piston engines, 2,500 hp (1,900 kW) each for take-off
- Propellers: 4-bladed constant-speed fully-feathering reversible-pitch propellers

Performance

- Maximum speed: 180 kn (210 mph, 330 km/h)
- Cruise speed: 130 kn (150 mph, 240 km/h)
- Range: 1,680 nmi (1,930 mi, 3,110 km)
- Service ceiling: 23,300 ft (7,100 m)

Armament

- 4× GAU-2/A 7.62 mm (0.30 in) miniguns, 1,500 rounds/gun
- 2× M61 Vulcan 20 mm (0.787 in) 6-barreled Gatling cannon (AC-119K variant only)
- 60× Mk 24 flares in a LAU-74/A flare launcher

== Gallery ==
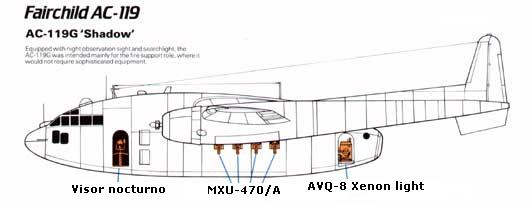
Armament layout of AC-119G Shadow.

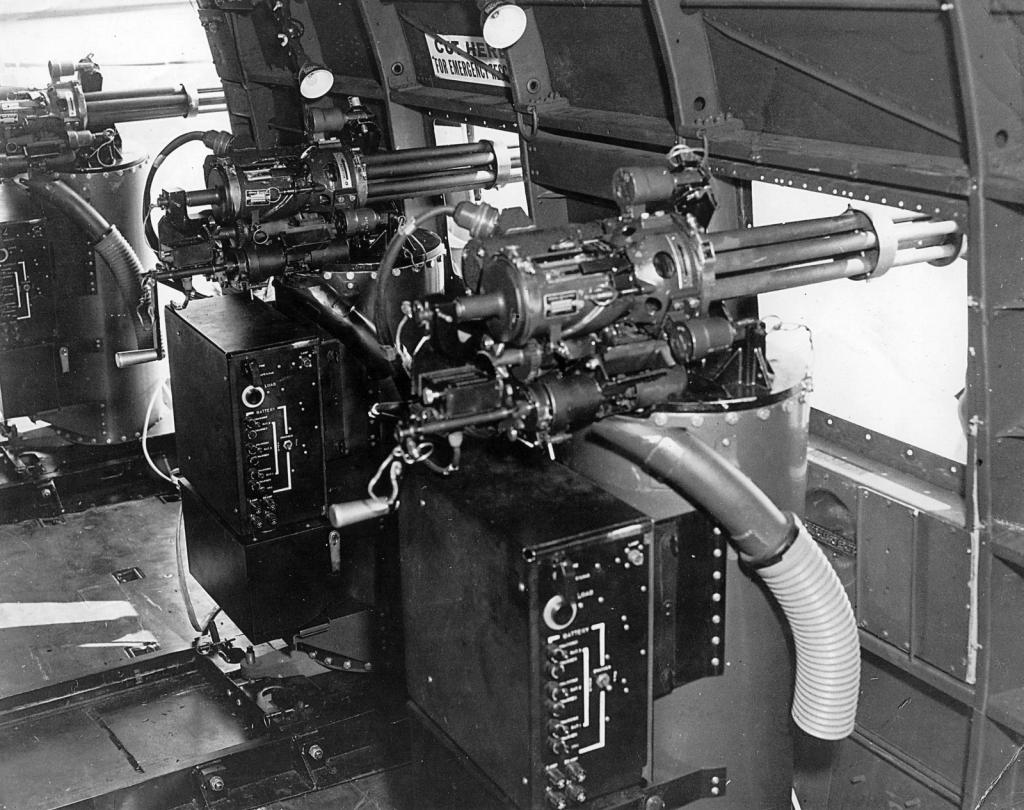
MXU-470 installed on a AC-47.

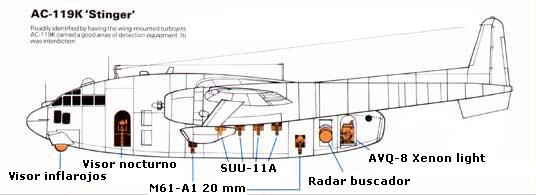
Armament layout of AC-119K Stinger.

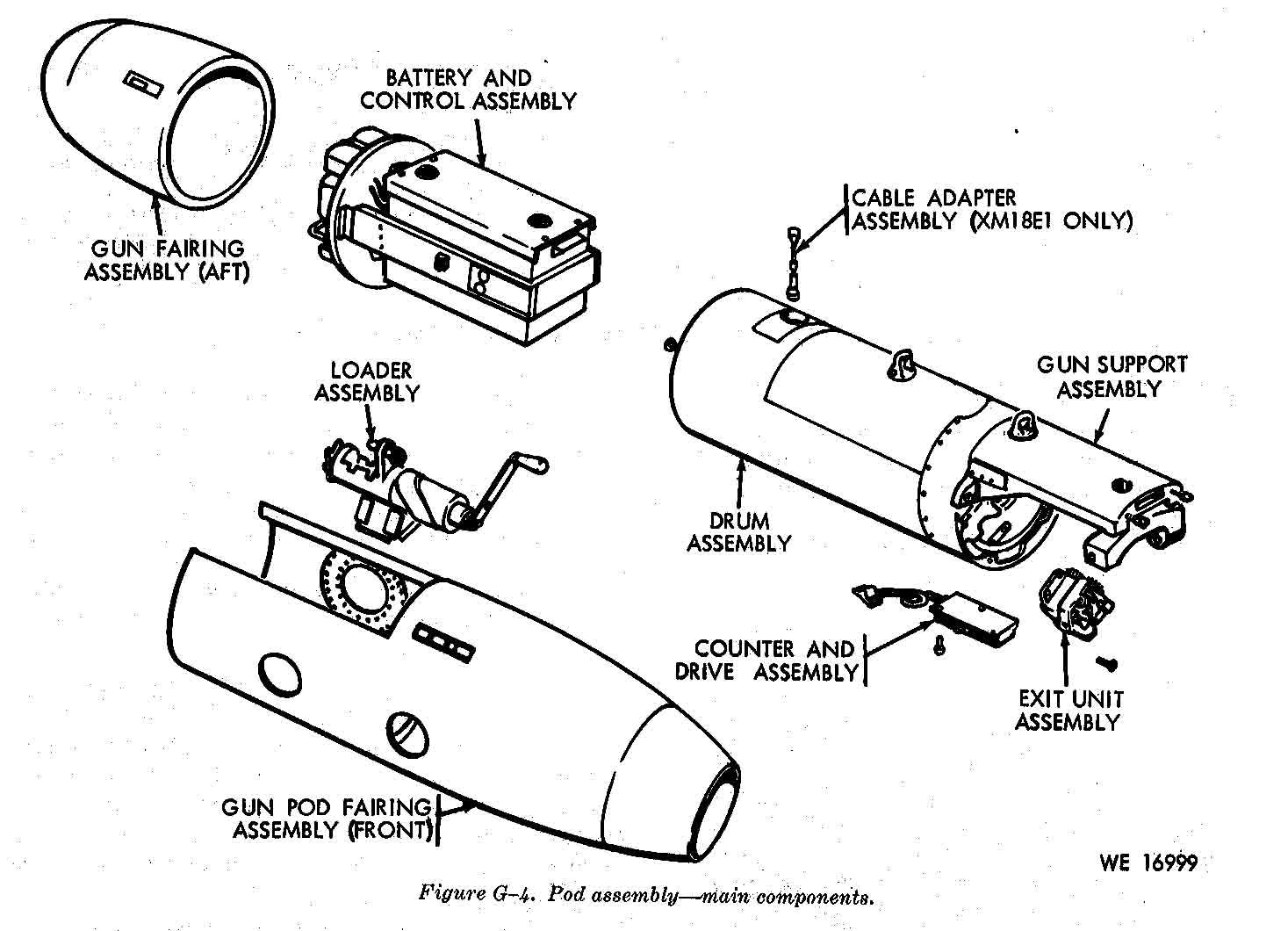
SUU-11A/A components.

== See also ==
Related development

- Fairchild C-119 Flying Boxcar

Aircraft of comparable role, configuration, and era

- Alenia AC-27J
- Douglas AC-47 Spooky
- Lockheed AC-130

Related lists

- List of attack aircraft
- List of military aircraft of the United States
- List of military electronics of the United States
