= 71st Special Operations Squadron =

71st Special Operations Squadron

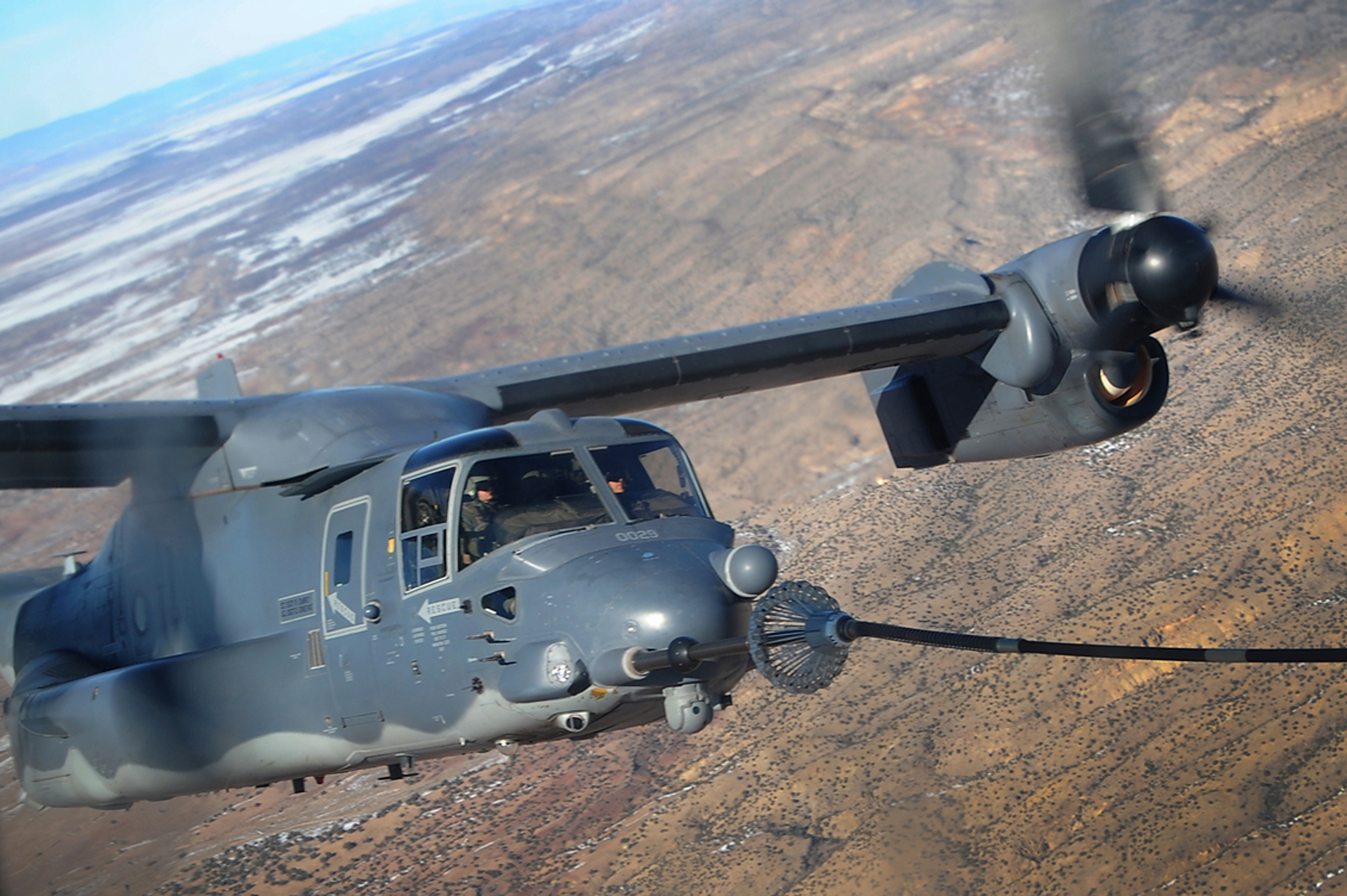
- A 71st Special Operations CV-22 Osprey refuels over New Mexico
- Active: 1943–1946 1947–1953; 1953–1973; 1987–1993; 2005–present
- Country: United States
- Branch: United States Air Force
- Role: Special Operations Training
- Part of: Air Education and Training Command
- Motto(s): Strike Swiftly (2005-present); Anywhere Anytime (1987-1993)
- Decorations: Distinguished Unit Citation; Presidential Unit Citation; Air Force Outstanding Unit Award; French Croix de Guerre with Palm; French Fourragère; Republic of Vietnam Gallantry Cross with Palm

Insignia
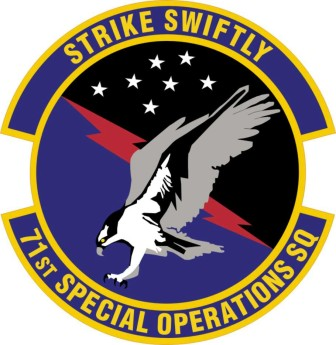
- 71st Special Operations Squadron emblem (Note: Approved 27 June 2005.)

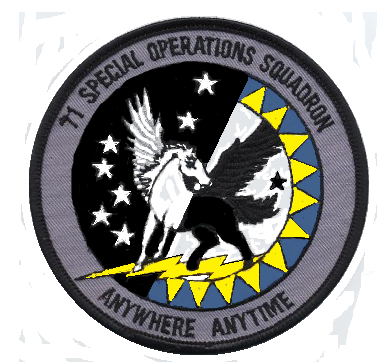
- 71st Special Operations Squadron emblem (1987-1993)

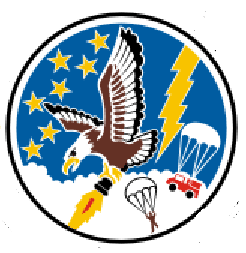
- 71st Air Commando Squadron emblem

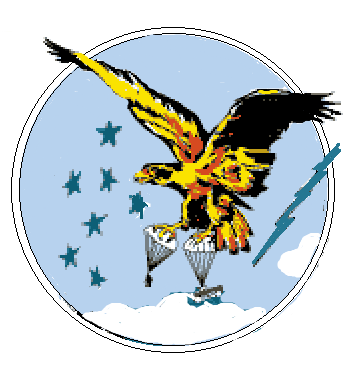
- 71st Troop Carrier Squadron emblem (Note: Approved 28 April 1960.)

The 71st Special Operations Squadron is part of the 58th Special Operations Wing at Kirtland Air Force Base, New Mexico. It operates Bell Boeing CV-22 Osprey conducting special operations flying training.

== Mission ==
Provide Combat Ready CV-22 Aircrews to Air Force Special Operations Command.

== History ==
=== World War II ===
Established in early 1943 as a Douglas C-47 Skytrain transport squadron under First Air Force, later trained under I Troop Carrier Command in the eastern United States. Deployed to England in late 1943, being assigned to IX Troop Carrier Command to participate in the buildup of forces prior to the Allied landings in France during D–Day in June 1944.

Engaged in combat operations by dropping paratroops into Normandy on D-Day (6 June 1944) and releasing gliders with reinforcements on the following day. The unit received a Distinguished Unit Citation and a French citation for these missions.

After the Normandy invasion the squadron ferried supplies in the United Kingdom. The squadron also hauled food, clothing, medicine, gasoline, ordnance equipment, and other supplies to the front lines and evacuated patients to rear zone hospitals. It dropped paratroops near Nijmegen and towed gliders carrying reinforcements during the airborne attack on the Netherlands. In December, it participated in the Battle of the Bulge by releasing gliders with supplies for the 101st Airborne Division near Bastogne.

Moved to France in early 1945, and participated in the Western Allied invasion of Germany, participating in the air assault across the Rhine River in March 1945, each aircraft towed two gliders with troops of the 17th Airborne Division and released them near Wesel.

Returned to the United States in August 1945, becoming a domestic troop carrier squadron for Continental Air Forces, inactivated July 1946. For its perseverance and bravery, the 71st received the Distinguished Unit Citation and the French Croix de Guerre with Palm.

=== Air Force reserve and Korean War ===
It conducted Reserve troop carrier training after the war. The 71st was called to active duty status during the Korean War from, 1951–1953.

=== Return to reserve operations ===
The squadron was again called to active duty during the Cuban Missile Crisis in 1962. From June to December 1968, the squadron continued airlift support of Tactical Air Command and Air Force Logistics Command, while training in operations of AC-119G gunships.

=== Vietnam War ===
On 15 June 1968, about a month after its parent 930th Tactical Airlift Group had been mobilized at Bakalar Air Force Base, with eighteen C-119Gs, the 71st Tactical Airlift Squadron moved to Lockbourne Air Force Base, Ohio, and converted to AC-119 gunship operations. On that same date, the 71st was redesignated as the 71st Air Commando Squadron, a name that lasted less than a month, as the unit became the 71st Special Operations Squadron on 8 July. Conversion from tactical airlift to gunship operations in the AC-119 brought significant changes. The crew composition increased from five to eight as the crew acquired a second navigator and two gunners while the loadmaster cross-trained as an illuminator operator. Also, a change in the ratio of crews to airplanes increased total crew requirements from 16 to 24.

By 21 November 1968, the crews had formed and were ready. The aircrews left for South Vietnam on 5 December; four days later, other elements of the squadron left via Lockheed C-141 Starlifters. The unit was reassigned to the 14th Special Operations Wing on 20 December 1968. During its time in South Vietnam, the 71st got away cheaply for having flown more than 6,000 hours in six months in a combat zone. It lost no aircraft, and only six received any kind of battle damage in the air. The most serious incident involved an aircraft struck by about 26 rounds of 12.7-mm fire which put 19 holes in the aft part of the fuselage and caused minor lacerations in the neck and back of a gunner. This active force man was augmenting the basic reserve crew; nevertheless he became the first combat casualty aboard an Air Force reserve aircraft since the 452d Bombardment Wing was relieved at Pusan East (K-9) Air Base, South Korea, on 7 May 1952 during the Korean War.

The squadron was relieved from active service and returned to Bakalar Air Force Base on 18 June 1969. It was inactivated on 1 October 1973.

=== Southwest Asia ===
In 1987, the squadron was reactivated in the Air Force Reserve with HH-3E aircraft at Davis-Monthan AFB, Arizona as a geographically separated unit of the 919th Special Operations Group at Duke Field, Florida. The squadron was mobilized to active duty status on 1 January 1991 and carried out combat search, rescue, visual reconnaissance and other special operations in Southwest Asia from, January–April 1991. The 71st was again relieved from active status on 21 April 1992 and returned to Reserve status. In 1993, it was transferred from the Air Force Reserve to the Air Education and Training Command and reassigned and relocated to the 58th Special Operations Wing at Kirtland AFB, New Mexico.

=== Air Education and Training Command ===
The 71 SOS was reactivated on 20 May 2005 at Kirtland Air Force Base, New Mexico to serve as the Air Force's Bell Boeing CV-22 Osprey training squadron. The unique capabilities of the CV-22 required the creation of a separate squadron from existing Air Education and Training Command training squadrons. Regular training operations began in early 2007.

=== Campaigns and decorations ===
- Campaigns. World War II: Normandy; Northern France; Rhineland; Ardennes-Alsace; Central Europe. Vietnam: Vietnam Air Offensive, Phase IV; TET 69/Counteroffensive. Southwest Asia: Defense of Saudi Arabia; Liberation and Defense of Kuwait.
- Decorations. Distinguished Unit Citation: France, [6–7] Jun 1944. Presidential Unit Citation: 19 December 1968 – 31 May 1969. Air Force Outstanding Unit Awards: 19 December 1968 – 30 April 1969; 22 March 1989 – 21 March 1991; 1 June 1990 – 31 May 1992; 1 June 1992–[1 October 1993]; [20 May]-30 June 2005; 1 July 2006 – 30 June 2007; 1 July 2007 – 30 June 2008. French Croix de Guerre with Palm: 6–7 June 1944; 20–28 August 1944. French Fourragere. Republic of Vietnam Gallantry Cross with Palm: 14 February 1968–[1] June 1969.

== Lineage ==
- Constituted as the 71st Troop Carrier Squadron on 30 January 1943

Activated on 9 February 1943
Inactivated on 31 July 1946

- Activated in the reserve on 15 March 1947

Redesignated 71st Troop Carrier Squadron, Medium on 1 July 1949
Ordered to active service on 1 May 1951
Inactivated on 1 February 1953

- Activated in the reserve on 1 February 1953

Ordered to active service on 28 October 1962
Relieved from active service on 28 November 1962
Redesignated 71st Tactical Airlift Squadron on 1 July 1967
Ordered to active service on 13 May 1968
Redesignated 71st Air Commando Squadron on 15 June 1968
Redesignated 71st Special Operations Squadron on 8 July 1968
Relieved from active service on 18 June 1969
Inactivated on 1 October 1973

- Activated in the Reserve on 1 October 1987

Inactivated on 1 October 1993
Activated on 20 May 2005

=== Assignments ===
- 434th Troop Carrier Group, 9 February 1943 – 31 July 1946
- 434th Troop Carrier Group, 15 March 1947 – 1 February 1953
- 434th Troop Carrier Group, 1 February 1953
- 434th Troop Carrier Wing, 14 April 1959
- 930th Troop Carrier Group, 11 February 1963
- 1st Air Commando Wing, 1 June 1968
- 14th Special Operations Wing, 20 December 1968
- 930th Special Operations Group, 10 June 1969 – 1 October 1973
- Fourth Air Force, 1 October 1987
- 919th Special Operations Group, 1 April 1990
- 919th Operations Group, 1 August 1992 – 1 October 1993
- 58th Operations Group, 20 May 2005 – present

=== Stations ===
- Alliance Army Air Field, Nebraska, 9 February 1943
- Baer Field, Indiana, 4–28 September 1943
- RAF Fulbeck (AAF-488), England, Oct 1943
- RAF Welford (AAF-474), England, Nov 1943
- RAF Fulbeck (AAF-488), England, 10 January 1944
- RAF Aldermaston (AAF-467), England, 3 March 1944
- Mourmelon-le-Grand Airfield (A-80), France, Feb–Jun 1945
- Baer Field, Indiana, 5 August 1945
- Alliance Army Air Field, Nebraska, 15 September 1945
- George Field, Illinois, 11 October 1945
- Greenville Army Air Base, South Carolina, 2 February-31 Jul 1946
- Lunken Airport, Ohio, 1 August 1947
- Atterbury Air Force Base, Indiana, 1 July 1949
- Lawson Air Force Base, Georgia, 23 January 1952 – 1 February 1953
- Atterbury Air Force Base (later Bakalar Air Force Base), Indiana, 1 February 1953
- Lockbourne Air Force Base, Ohio, 17 June-c. 20 December 1968
- Nha Trang Air Base, South Vietnam, 20 December 1968 – 1 June 1969
- Bakalar Air Force Base, Indiana, 10 June 1969
- Grissom Air Force Base, Indiana, 15 January 1970 – 1 October 1973
- Davis-Monthan Air Force Base, Arizona, 1 October 1987 – 1 October 1993 (deployed to King Fahd Airport, Saudi Arabia, 12 January 1991 – c.16 March 1992)
- Kirtland Air Force Base, New Mexico, 20 May 2005 – present

=== Aircraft ===
- Douglas C-47 Skytrain
- L-4 Grasshopper (1943–1945)
- L-5 Sentinel (1943–1945)
- Stinson L-1 Vigilant (1944–1945)
- Noorduyn UC-64 Norseman (1944–1945)
- Curtiss C-46 Commando (1953–1957)
- Fairchild C-119 Flying Boxcar (1957–1968, 1970)
- Fairchild AC-119 Shadow (1968–1969)
- Cessna A-37 Dragonfly (1971–1973)
- Sikorsky CH-3 (1987–1990)
- Sikorsky HH-3 Jolly Green Giant (1987–1992)
- Sikorsky MH-60 Black Hawk (1992–1993)
- CV-22 Osprey (2005 – present)
