= Nha Trang Air Base =

Former airbase in Vietnam

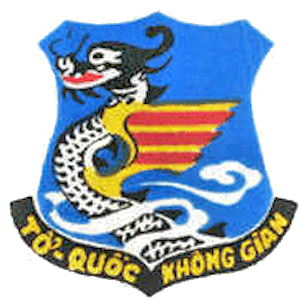
Nha Trang Air Base
- Part of French Air Force; Republic of Vietnam Air Force (RVNAF); Pacific Air Forces (USAF); Vietnam People's Air Force (VPAF)

Site information
- Type: Air Force Base
- Controlled by: French Air Force; Vietnam People's Air Force Republic of Vietnam Air Force United States Air Force
- Condition: Seized 1975 by PAVN, later used as a military airfield/civil airport. Now closed

Location
- Coordinates: 12°13′39″N 109°11′33″E

Site history
- Built: 1949
- In use: 1949–2009
- Battles/wars: Vietnam War

Garrison information
- Garrison: 14th Special Operations Wing (USAF)

Airfield information
- IATA: NHA; ICAO: VVNT

Summary
- Elevation AMSL: 6 m (20 ft)
- Coordinates: 12°13′39″N 109°11′34″E
- Interactive map of Airfield information

Runways
Direction	Length		Surface
Direction	m	ft	Surface
12/30	1,951	6,401	Asphalt

Nha Trang Airport (IATA: NHA, ICAO: VVNT) (also known as Camp McDermott Airfield and Long Van Airfield) was a French Air Force, Republic of Vietnam Air Force (RVNAF), United States Air Force (USAF) and Vietnam People's Air Force (VPAF) (Khong Quan Nhan Dan Viet Nam) military airfield used during the Vietnam War. It is located on the southern edge of Nha Trang in Khánh Hòa Province. (Note: The Kelley reference is divided into several sections with each section starting its page numbering with page 1, therefore citations for this reference follows the same pattern.)

== First Indochina War ==
The French Air Force opened an air training center for the fledgling RVNAF in 1951 and in March 1952 began training pilots, navigators and maintenance personnel at the base.

On 4 January 1953 maintenance personnel from the USAF 24th Air Depot Wing at Clark Air Base were sent on temporary duty to Nha Trang to provide maintenance support for Douglas C-47 Skytrains provided to the French Air Force, they would be replaced by French crews on 14 August 1953.

In May 1953 USAF crews delivered 6 Fairchild C-119 Flying Boxcars to Nha Trang, these were then flown by Civil Air Transport crews to Cat Bi Air Base.

== RVNAF use ==
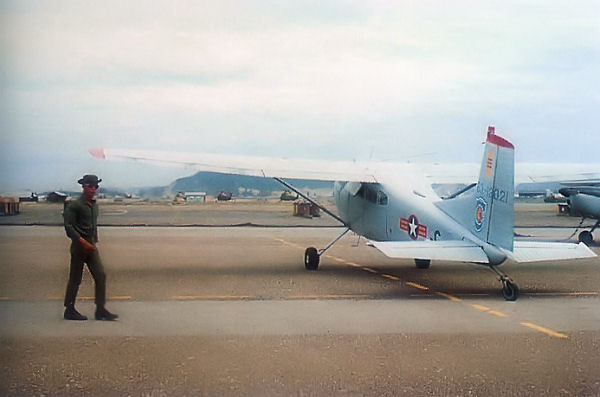
RVNAF U-17 with flight instructor at Nha Trang Air Base

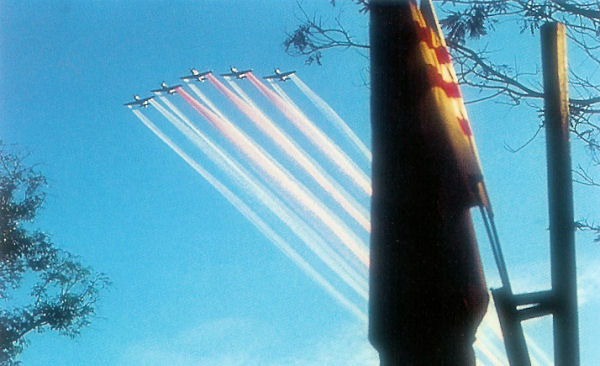
RVNAF A-1E Skyraiders forming South Vietnamese flag in the sky

On 7 July 1955 the RVNAF took over the Nha Trang Training Center and formed the 1st and 2nd Liaison Squadrons equipped with Cessna L-19s. At this time Nha Trang had a 5,900 feet (1,800 m) asphalt runway that could be extended.

In December 1961 the RVNAF 2nd Fighter Squadron equipped with North American T-28A/B Trojan's was formed at Nha Trang. In late 1961 four USAF T-28 pilots from Operation Farm Gate were sent to Nha Trang to train RVNAF crews. The 2nd Fighter Squadron became fully operation in mid-1962. It was renamed the 516th Fighter Squadron in January 1963.

In September 1962 the RVNAF 12th Air Base Squadron was formed at the base.

In September 1963 the USAF opened a training center at the base equipped with L-19s. RVNAF flight crews would undergo one month of preflight training followed by three months of primary flight training with a total of 80 flying hours.

In February 1964 the 516th Fighter Squadron moved to Da Nang Air Base.

In June 1964 the 116th Liaison Squadron equipped with O-1s was activated at the base.

In January 1965 the RVNAF 62nd Tactical Wing and 516th Fighter Squadron, equipped with Douglas A-1H Skyraiders deployed to Nha Trang from Pleiku Air Base while a new runway was built at Pleiku.

In August 1965 the 524th Fighter Squadron equipped with A-1s was activated at the base.

On 30 June 1969 all Douglas AC-47 Spooky gunships of D Flight, 3rd Special Operations Squadron were transferred to the RVNAF at the base.

== American use ==
8th Field Hospital and 57th Medical Detachment (Helicopter Ambulance) (HU-1A Iroquois) both arrived during April 1962.

The USAF Detachment 12, Thirteenth Air Force had been supporting RVNAF operations at Nha Trang since February 1962 and in May 1962 they were designated the 6223rd Air Base Squadron and on 7 June it was assigned to the 2nd Advanced Echelon (2d ADVON).

In September 1962 the 23rd Special Air Warfare Detachment equipped with six Grumman OV-1 Mohawk reconnaissance aircraft deployed to Nha Trang and began flying visual and photo-reconnaissance in support of RVNAF and Army of the Republic of Vietnam (ARVN) units.

In December 1963 Detachment 4, 8th Aerial Port Squadron was formed at the base.

In July 1963 the 37th Air Base Squadron replaced the 6223rd Air Base Squadron.

On 23 September 1963 three Viet Cong (VC) sappers penetrated the base and destroyed two C-47s with satchel charges.

From February 1964 three Fairchild C-123B Providers and three air commando C-47s were kept at Nha Trang to support operations of the 5th Special Forces Group which had its headquarters at Nha Trang. These aircraft supported remote Special Forces bases, delivering 1,500 tons of supplies per month. In December 1964 half of the 310th Troop Carrier Squadron equipped with seven C-123s were sent to Nha Trang to replace the C-47s. In addition three U.S. Army and one Royal Australian Air Force de Havilland Canada CV-2 Caribous were also sent to support the Special Forces.

498th Medical Company (Air Ambulance) with UH-1Ds from September 1965.

In late November 1965 the 5th Air Commando Squadron equipped with four C-47s and 17 Helio U-10 Super Couriers was formed at the base and then dispersed to forward operating bases throughout central South Vietnam.

In January 1966 the A-1 equipped 602nd Air Commando Squadron moved to Nha Trang from Bien Hoa Air Base.

From 1967 the 571st Medical Detachment (Helicopter Ambulance) and the 254th Medical Detachment (Helicopter Ambulance) both with UH-1Ds were deployed here.

The RVNAF 2nd Air Division took over the base from the USAF in mid-1970.

=== 14th Air Commando Wing/14th Special Operations Wing ===
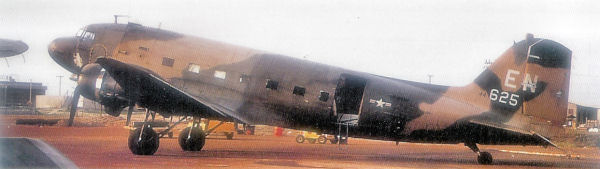
AC-47 Spooky gunship Serial 44-76625 of the 4th Air Commando Squadron, March 1969

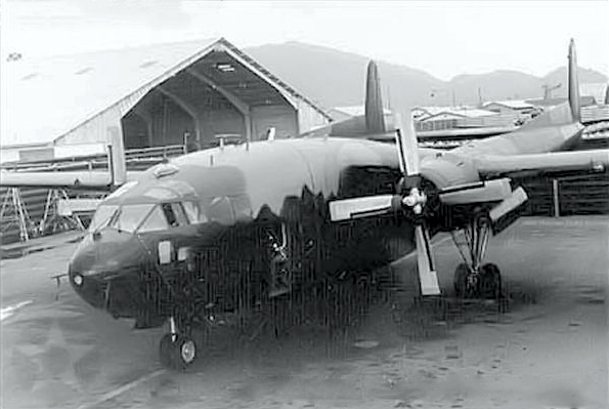
AC-119G Shadow gunship Serial 53-3178 17th Special Operations Squadron at Nha Trang

The 14th Air Commando Wing was activated at Nha Trang on 8 March 1966 and it would be the host unit at the base until 15 October 1969 when it moved to Phan Rang Air Base. The airfield was managed by the 14th Combat Support Group.

On its establishment the 14th Wing assumed control of all USAF squadrons at Nha Trang and the 1st Air Commando Squadron (before it moved to Pleiku Air Base) and it later assumed control of the 20th Helicopter Squadron.

In April 1966 the 361st Tactical Reconnaissance Squadron equipped with EC-47s was formed at the base.

From July–December USAF RED HORSE units carried out 22 major construction/reconstruction projects of maintenance and storages areas, parking ramps, accommodation, roads and drainage took place at the base to accommodate the expanded activity there. Housing on the base was in short supply and the USAF billets were adjacent to an ARVN ammunition dump which was later relocated north to Nha Trang, many of the new arrivals were forced to live in tents until proper accommodation could be built.

In January 1967 Flight C from the 4th Air Commando Squadron equipped with AC-47 Spooky gunships began operating from the base.

On 21 September 1967 the first Lockheed AC-130A Project Gunship II prototype arrived at Nha Trang for combat evaluation, the evaluation program concluded on 8 December 1967.

On 25 October 1967 the 14th Air Commando Squadron was activated at Nha Trang, with three AC-47s of A Flight-based there.

In late December 1968 the 71st Special Operations Squadron equipped with AC-119G Shadow gunships arrived from Lockbourne Air Force Base and began operations from the base. On 1 June 1969 the 17th Special Operations Squadron equipped with AC-119G gunships was activated at Nha Trang and it replaced the 71st Special Operations Squadron which returned to Bakalar Air Force Base for inactivation.

In mid-1969, as part of the process of Vietnamization, USAF units at Nha Trang began to relocate or inactivate and by October 1969 all USAF units had left the base and only 800 USAF personnel remained there to support operations until the handover of the base to the RVNAF in 1970.

== VPAF use ==
The VPAF used the base until 2009 when it moved its operations to Cam Ranh Air Base.

== Closure and redevelopment ==
In January 2016 it was announced that the base would be sold for redevelopment with an indicative value of US$540m.

== Bibliography ==
- Mesco, Jim (1987) VNAF Republic of Vietnam Air Force 1945–1975 Squadron/Signal Publications. ISBN 0-89747-193-8
- Mikesh, Robert C. (2005) Flying Dragons: The Republic of Vietnam Air Force. Schiffer Publishing, Ltd. ISBN 0-7643-2158-7
