= 483rd Tactical Airlift Wing =

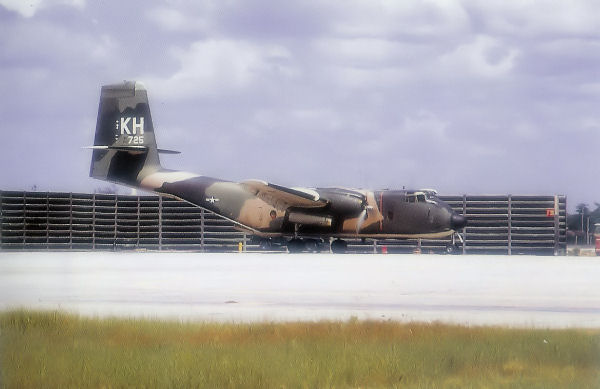
- Tong 725, a C-7A Caribou of the 535th Tactical Airlift Squadron, October 1971
- Active: 1953–1960, 1966–1972
- Country: United States
- Branch: United States Air Force
- Role: Airlift
- Motto: Efficient Airlift Support
- Engagements: Korean Service; Vietnam Service
- Decorations: Presidential Unit Citation; Air Force Outstanding Unit Award with Combat "V" Device; Air Force Outstanding Unit Award; Korean Presidential Unit Citation; Vietnamese Gallantry Cross with Palm

Insignia
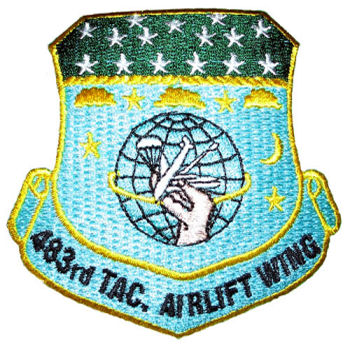
- Patch with 483rd Tactical Airlift Wing emblem (Note: Approved 2 February 1956)

The 483rd Tactical Airlift Wing was a tactical airlift and composite wing assigned to Pacific Air Forces during the Vietnam War. It was the host organization at Cam Ranh Bay Air Base South Vietnam from 1970 to 1972.

The Wing was first organized as the 483rd Troop Carrier Wing during the Korean War, as an airlift organization assigned to Far East Air Forces (later Pacific Air Forces).

== History ==
=== Korean War ===
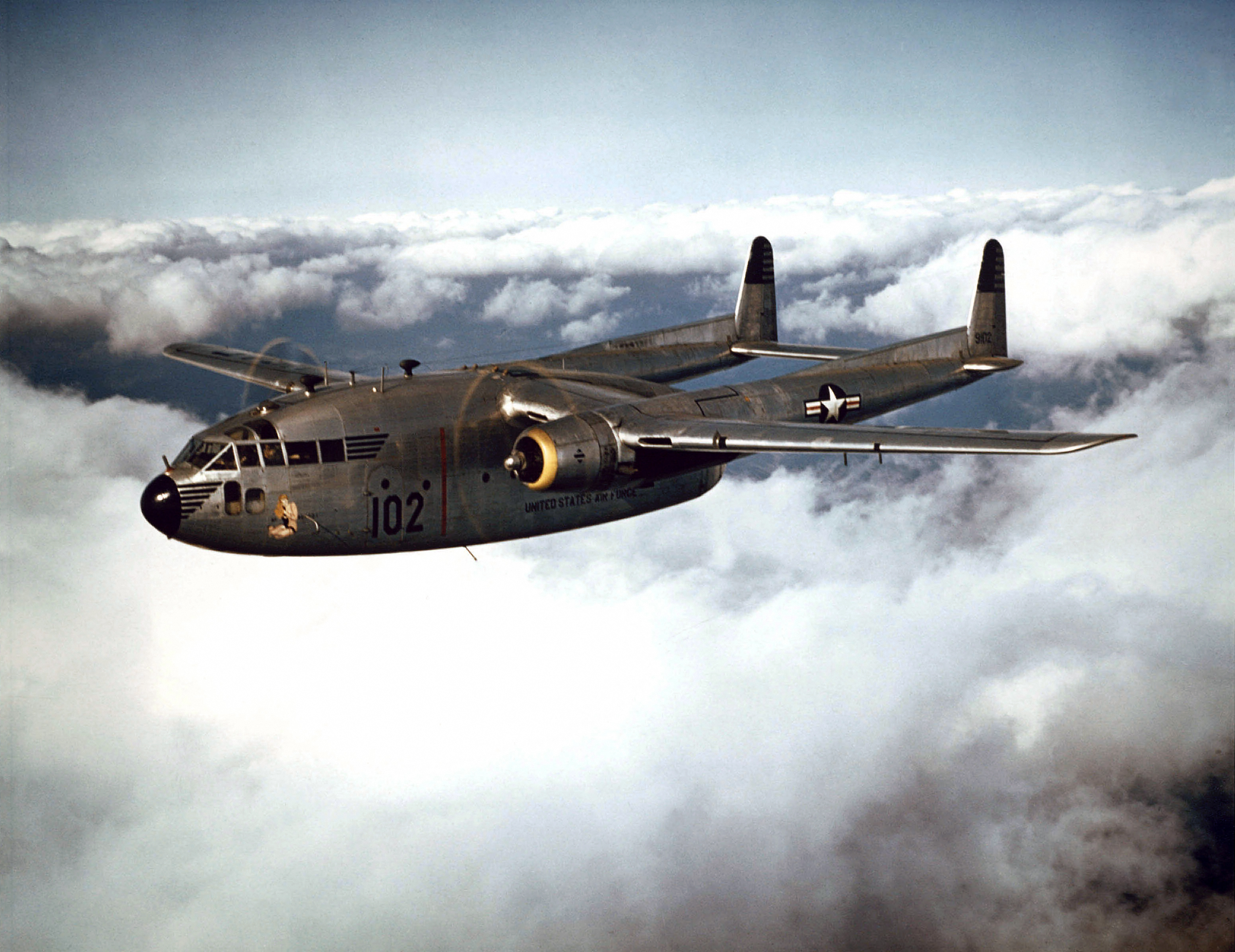
C-119B 49–109 of the wing's 314th Troop Carrier Group

The wing was activated at Ashiya Air Base, Japan as the 483rd Troop Carrier Wing on 1 January 1953 and replaced the 403rd Troop Carrier Wing, Medium and absorbed the 403rd's mission, personnel and equipment. It was assigned to the 315th Air Division of Far East Air Forces for duty in the Korean War.

The wing was equipped with Fairchild C-119 Flying Boxcars and performed troop carrier and air transport operations in the Far East, including landing of troops and cargo in forward areas of the combat zone, air transportation of airborne troops and equipment, and air evacuation of casualties. In June 1953, as the Korean war neared an armistice, all wing C-119s airlifted the entire 187th Regimental Combat Team (Airborne) from Kyushu, Japan to Seoul and Chunch'on, South Korea, to preclude enemy breakthroughs. This was the largest mass movement of personnel in the history of combat cargo to that time. For is actions in the Korean War, the wing received the Korean Presidential Unit Citation.

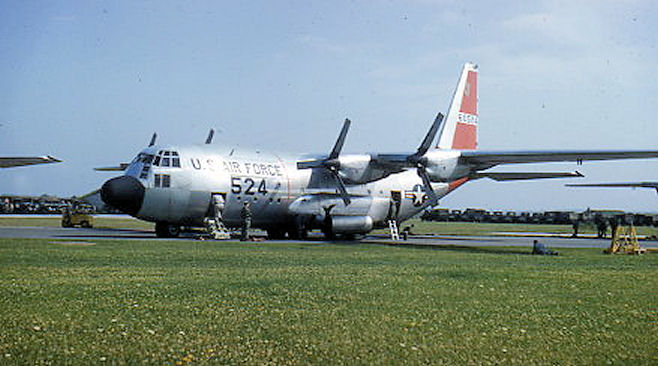
C-130A similar to planes assigned to wing

Between April 1953 and September 1954, the wing aided the French Air Force in Indochina by training aircrews, evacuating wounded, and maintaining aircraft. For these actions, the wing became one of the first units in the Air Force to receive the Air Force Outstanding Unit Award. In 1958, the wing began to reequip with Lockheed C-130 Hercules aircraft. Its transition was complete by 1959. It performed theater transport duties and participated in joint exercises with Army units until inactivated in Japan on 23 June 1960. Its squadrons were transferred to the direct control of the 315th Air Division and relocated to Naha Air Base and Tachikawa Air Base, Japan as Ashiya closed.

=== Vietnam War ===
In August 1966, the Air Force and the Army began implementing Project Red Leaf, which would transfer responsibility for the de Havilland Canada C-7 Caribou from the Army to the Air Force following the Johnson-McConnell agreement of 1966. Air Force personnel began being assigned to the Army aviation companies flying the Caribou. Starting in late October personnel to form the cadre for the 483rd Troop Carrier Wing began to arrive at Cam Ranh Bay Air Base, South Viet Nam. The cadre began planning to move squadron level operations from the small Army camps they were operating from to permanent sites when the Air Force units were activated. Although removal of Caribous from the Mekong Delta and An Khe was particularly controversial, the Department of Defense ordered that the wing's squadrons be located on Air Force installations, not Army posts. On 1 January 1967, the wing was organized and took over Caribou operations. Two squadrons each were located at Cam Ranh Bay, Vung Tau Air Base, and Phu Cat Air Base, although detachments were maintained at an additional six locations. (Note: One detachment was located in Thailand. Bowers, p. 360.) In December 1967, a Viet Cong mortar attack on Can Tho Airfield damaged two wing C-7s. As a result wing planes were no longer stationed at Can Tho, Nha Trang Air Base, or Pleiku Air Base.

The 483rd was assigned the mission of providing intra-theater airlift in support of United States military civic actions, combat support and civic assistance throughout the Republic of Vietnam. The wing's Caribou proved especially valuable in resupplying special forces camps, and largely supplanted the Fairchild C-123 Providers in performing this mission. Initially, the wing's 537th Troop Carrier Squadron was dedicated to supporting the 1st Cavalry Division. This arrangement continued until late 1968, when the division moved to the southern provinces and was more efficiently supported by the squadrons at Cam Ranh Bay and Vung Tau.

The C-7s provided the light load-short haul transport to rough landing strips in South Vietnam. The unique capabilities of the C-7 for short landing and takeoff made Caribou transports vital to the war effort. On many occasions the C-7A's flew emergency airlift missions to airstrips and combat areas that no other aircraft could reach. Most notable were those in support of special forces camps in the Central Highlands.

In June 1968 the wing flew a record 2,420 combat troops in three days between Dak Pek, Ben Het and Dak To. In August 1968 pinpoint night airdrops were accomplished at Duc Lap, Ha Thanh and Tonle Cham special forces camps. Ammunition and medical supplies were parachuted into 75-foot-square drop zones while the camps were under attack. In June 1969 during the siege of Ben Het more than 200 tons of ammunition, POL, rations, water and medical supplies were airdropped into a 100 x 200-foot zone with every load on target and 100 per cent recovered.

In March 1969, a provisional group was established at Vung Tau Airfield to exercise command and control over the wing's units located there. In June 1970, the group was discontinued when the Caribou squadrons at Vung Tau moved to Cam Ranh Bay. With the inactivation of the 459th Tactical Airlift Squadron that month, all but one C-7 squadron was located with the wing.

In March 1970, when the 12th Tactical Fighter Wing moved to Phu Cat Air Base, the 483rd Wing became the host wing at Cam Ranh Bay. As a corollary to assuming the support mission for the base, support organizations assigned to the wing carried out a number of civic actions, including construction of housing, providing support for orphanages and educational institutions and improvement of water supply systems.

In April 1970, the wing, designated the 483rd Tactical Airlift Wing since August 1967, helped break the siege of Dak Seang Special Forces Camp. North Vietnamese forces had surrounded the camp, and learning from the success of air resupply during their 1969 attack on the Ben Het Camp, also established anti-aircraft artillery positions along likely air resupply corridors. On the first day of the siege, two wing C-7s were diverted from their scheduled missions and staged out of Pleiku to make the first airdrops to the camp. The following day, a C-7 was lost shortly after releasing its load. Resupply of the camp was so urgent that all drop-qualified crews of the wing were ordered to Pleiku to support the operation and eleven sorties were flown that day with cover from Douglas A-1 Skyraiders. Crews approached the camp from the north or south to use terrain to mask their approaches from enemy flak. Loss of the third Caribou in five days prompted a move to resupply the camp with night drops, with cover and illumination provided by Fairchild AC-119 Stinger gunships. The majority of the missions were flown by the 537th Squadron, although all wing squadrons participated The wing flew 100 air-drop sorties under heavy hostile fire in ten days delivering some 400,000 pounds of vital supplies. The wing earned a second Presidential Unit Citation for this action, evacuation of over 2000 refugees from Cambodia, and transportation of the Presidential Southeast Asia Investigation Team to various remote locations in South Vietnam.

On 31 August 1971 the remaining unit at Phu Cat Air Base, the 537th Tactical Airlift Squadron, inactivated, followed shortly thereafter by the 536th Tactical Airlift Squadron. During their five years' flying for the 483rd, the C-7A Caribous carried more than 4.7 million passengers, averaging more than one million a year during 1967–1969. At the same time the wing averaged more than 100,000 tons of cargo each year.

On 31 August 1971, three electronic warfare squadrons from the inactivating 460th Tactical Reconnaissance Wing, stationed at various bases in Viet Nam, were assigned to the 483rd TAW. The following day, two special operations squadrons were transferred from the inactivating 14th Special Operations Wing. The electronic warfare squadrons were inactivated or assigned to other wings within six months.

The three remaining C-7 squadrons inactivated in early 1972 (535th Tactical Airlift Squadron on 24 January, 458th Tactical Airlift Squadron on 1 March, and 457th Tactical Airlift Squadron on 30 April). Most of the C-7 Caribous were transferred to the VNAF. No. 35 Squadron RAAF at Vung Tau flew its last mission on 13 February 1972 and departed South Vietnam for RAAF Base Richmond in Australia on 19 February 1972; it was the last RAAF unit to leave following the decision to withdraw. The mixture of reassigned squadrons from other wings were all inactivated or reassigned by the end of May. The 483rd Tactical Airlift Wing was inactivated on 31 May 1972. For its service in Vietnam, the 483rd was awarded two Presidential Unit Citations, three Air Force Outstanding Unit Awards with Combat "V" Device and three Republic of Viet Nam Gallantry Crosses with Palm.

== Lineage ==
483rd Tactical Airlift Wing

- Constituted as the 483rd Troop Carrier Wing, Medium, on 15 November 1952

Activated on 1 January 1953
Discontinued and inactivated, on 25 June 1960

- Redesignated 483rd Troop Carrier Wing on 12 October 1966 and activated (not organized)

Organized on 15 October 1966
Redesignated 483rd Tactical Airlift Wing on 1 August 1967
Inactivated on 31 May 1972

=== Assignments ===
- Tactical Air Command (Attached to 315th Air Division (Combat Cargo)), 1 January 1953 – 30 June 1954
- 315th Air Division (Combat Cargo), 1 July 1954 – 25 June 1960
- Pacific Air Forces, 12 October 1966 (not organized)
- 834th Air Division, 15 October 1966 (Not operational, 15 October 1966 – 3 November 1966)
- Seventh Air Force, 1 December 1971 – 31 May 1972

=== Components ===
==== Groups ====
- 314th Troop Carrier Group, 1 January 1953 – 15 November 1954 (Attached)
- 316th Troop Carrier Group, 15 November 1954 – 18 June 1957 (Attached—Not operational after 15 March 1956)
- 483d Troop Carrier Group, 1 January 1953 – 8 December 1958 (Not operational after 15 March 1956)
- 483rd Air Base Group (later 483rd Combat Support Group), 1 January 1953 – 25 June 1960, 31 March 1970 – 31 May 1972
- 483rd Maintenance & Supply Group, 1 January 1953 – 8 December 1958 (Not operational after 15 March 1956)
- 483rd Medical Group (later 483rd Tactical Hospital, 483rd USAF Hospital), 1 January 1953 – 25 June 1960, 31 March 1970 – 31 May 1972
- Tactical Group, Provisional, 6483rd, 15 March 1969 – 30 June 1970

Located at Vung Tau Airfield, Viet Nam

==== Operational Squadrons ====
Korean War

- 21st Troop Carrier Squadron: attached 1 July 1957 – 7 December 1958, assigned 8 December 1958 – 25 June 1960
- 36th Troop Carrier Squadron: attached 15 March 1956 – 18 June 1957
- 37th Troop Carrier Squadron: attached 15 March 1956 – 18 June 1957
- 75th Troop Carrier Squadron: attached 15 March 1956 – 18 June 1957
- 773d Troop Carrier Squadron: attached c. 30 August 1958 – 10 December 1958.
- 815th Troop Carrier Squadron: attached 15 March 1956 – 8 December 1958, assigned 8 December 1958 – 25 June 1960
- 816th Troop Carrier Squadron: attached 15 March 1956 – 8 December 1958, assigned 8 Dec 1958-25 June 1960
- 817th Troop Carrier Squadron: attached 15 March 1956 – 8 December 1958, assigned 8 Dec 1958-25 June 1960
- 6461st Troop Carrier Squadron (later 6461st Air Transport Squadron): 1 January 1953 – 24 June 1955 (Attached)

Vietnam War

Airlift units (1967-1972)

- 457th Troop Carrier Squadron (later 457th Tactical Airlift) Squadron): 1 January 1967 – 30 April 1972 (Note: C-7A Tail Code: KA; call sign Cuddy)
- 458th Troop Carrier Squadron (later 458th Tactical Airlift) Squadron): 1 January 1967 – 1 March 1972 (Note: C-7A Tail Code: KC; call sign Law)
- 459th Troop Carrier Squadron (later 459th Tactical Airlift Squadron): 1 January 1967 – 1 June 1970 (Note: C-7A Tail Code: KE; call sign Ellis) (Phu Cat Air Base, Viet Nam)
- 535th Troop Carrier Squadron (later 535th Tactical Airlift Squadron): 1 January 1967 – 24 January 1972 (Note: C-7A Tail Code: KH; call sign Tong) (attached to Tactical Group, Provisional, 6483rd, 15 March 1969 – 30 June 1970) (Vung Tau Airfield until 21 June 1970)
- 536th Troop Carrier Squadron (later 536th Tactical Airlift) Squadron: 1 January 1967 – 15 October 1971 (Note: C-7A Tail Code: KL; call sign Iris) (attached to Tactical Group, Provisional, 6483rd, 15 March 1969 – 30 June 1970) (Vung Tau Airfield until c. 1 July 1970)
- 537th Troop Carrier (later 537th Tactical Airlift) Squadron: 1 January 1967 – 31 August 1971 (Note: C-7A Tail Code: KN; Soul) (Phu Cat Air Base, Viet Nam)
- Royal Australian Air Force, Transport Flight Vietnam (later 35 Squadron RAAF (Note: DHC-4 call sign: Wallaby) January 1967 – Feb 1972 (Vung Tau Air Base, Viet Nam)
- 20th Special Operations Squadron: 1 September 1971 – 1 April 1972 (Note: Bell UH-1 Iroquois)
- 90th Special Operations Squadron: 1 September 1971 – 15 April 1972 (Note: Cessna A-37 Dragonfly Tail Code: CG)

Stationed at Nha Trang Air Base, Viet Nam

- 360th Tactical Electronic Warfare Squadron: 31 August 1971 – 1 February 1972{{efn|Douglas EC-47N/P/Q Tail Code: AJ

Stationed at Tan Son Nhut Airport, Viet Nam

- 361st Tactical Electronic Warfare Squadron: 31 August 1971 – 1 December 1971 (Note: EC-47N/P/Q Tail Code: AL)

Stationed at Phu Cat Air Base, Viet Nam

- 362nd Tactical Electronic Warfare Squadron: 31 August 1971 – 1 February 1972 (Note: EC-47N/P/Q C-47H Tail Code: AN)

Stationed at Pleiku Air Base, Viet Nam

==== Support Units ====
- 6466th USAF Hospital: c. 1 July 1954 – 25 June 1960
- 483rd Avionics Maintenance Squadron: 15 Jul 1971 – 30 April 1972
- 483rd Field Maintenance Squadron (later 483rd Consolidated Aircraft Maintenance Squadron, 483rd Field Maintenance Squadron): 8 March 1958 – 25 June 1960, 1 January 1967 – 13 May 1972
- 483rd Flight Line Maintenance Squadron: 8 March 1958 – 18 December 1959
- 483rd Periodic Maintenance Squadron (later 483rd Organizational Maintenance Squadron): 8 March 1958 – 25 June 1960, 10 December 1970 – 30 April 1972
- 483rd Munitions Maintenance Squadron, 15 July 1971 – 30 April 1972
- 6483rd Flight Line Maintenance Squadron: 22 August 1957 – 8 March 1958
- 6483rd Periodic Maintenance Squadron: 22 August 1957 – 8 March 1958

=== Stations ===
- Ashiya Air Base, Japan, 1 January 1953 – 25 June 1960
- Cam Ranh Bay Air Base, South Vietnam, 15 October 1966 – 31 May 1972

=== Aircraft ===
- A-37B, 1971–1972
- C-7A, 1967–1972
- C-47D, 1953–1959
- VC-47D 1970–1971
- EC-47N 1971–1972)
- EC-47P 1971–1972)
- EC-47Q 1971–1972)
- C-119A, 1953–1955
- C-119B, 1953–1955
- C-119G, 1955–1959
- C-130A, 1958–1960
- UH-1, 1971–1972.

=== Awards ===
- Presidential Unit Citation

Southeast Asia 21 January 1968 – 12 May 1968
Southeast Asia 1 April 1970 – 30 June 1970

- Air Force Outstanding Unit Award with "V" Device

1 January 1967 – 30 April 1967
1 May 1967 – 30 April 1968
1 July 1970 – 31 December 1971

- Air Force Outstanding Unit Award

6 May 1953 – 10 September 1954

- Korean Presidential Unit Citation

1 January 1953 – 27 July 1953

- Republic of Viet Nam Gallantry Cross

15 October 1966 – 31 March 1968
1 August 1967 – 30 October 1971
1 May 1967 – 31 May 1972

- Korean Service Medal
- Campaigns

Third Korean Winter
Korea Summer-Fall 1953

- Viet Nam Service Medal
- Campaigns

Vietnam Air Offensive
Vietnam Air Offensive, Phase II
Vietnam Air Offensive, Phase III
Vietnam Air/Ground
Vietnam Air Offensive, Phase IV

TET69/Counteroffensive
Vietnam Summer-Fall 1969
Vietnam Winter-Spring 1970
Sanctuary Counteroffensive
Southwest Monsoon

Commando Hunt V
Commando Hunt VI
Commando Hunt VII
Vietnam Ceasefire
