= 536th Tactical Airlift Squadron =

536th Airlift Squadron
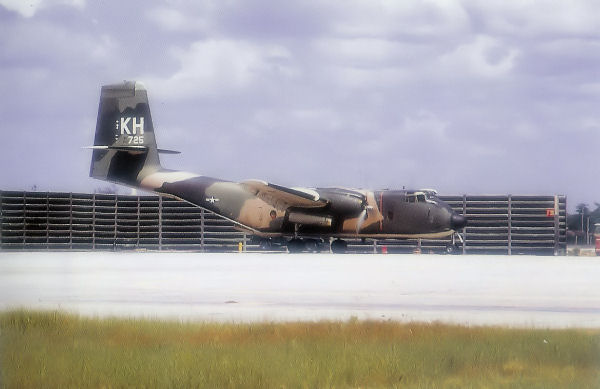
- C-7A Caribou of the 483d Tactical Airlift Wing at Cam Rahn Bay in 1971
- Active: 1943–1944; 1952–1953; 1966–1971
- Country: United States
- Branch: United States Air Force
- Role: Airlift
- Decorations: Presidential Unit Citation; Air Force Outstanding Unit Award; Republic of Vietnam Gallantry Cross with Palm

Insignia
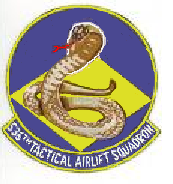
- 536th Tactical Airlift Squadron emblem
- Viet Nam Tail Code: KL

The 536th Tactical Airlift Squadron is an inactive squadron of the United States Air Force. The unit was last active at Cam Ranh Bay Air Base Viet Nam, where it was inactivated on 15 October 1971.

The squadron was first established during World War II as the 536th Fighter Squadron. It served as a Replacement Training Unit for Republic P-47 Thunderbolt pilots until it was disbanded in a major reorganization of the Army Air Forces in 1944 designed to streamline training organizations.

In 1952, the squadron was redesignated as the 536th Troop Carrier Squadron, and activated at Atterbury Air Force Base to replace elements of the 923d Reserve Training Wing. The following year the squadron was inactivated and replaced at Atterbury by the 72d Troop Carrier Squadron.

The unit was activated again in Viet Nam as a C-7 Caribou squadron assigned to the 483d Tactical Airlift Wing; the squadron was awarded three Presidential Unit Citations for its actions during the Viet Nam War.

== History ==
=== World War II ===
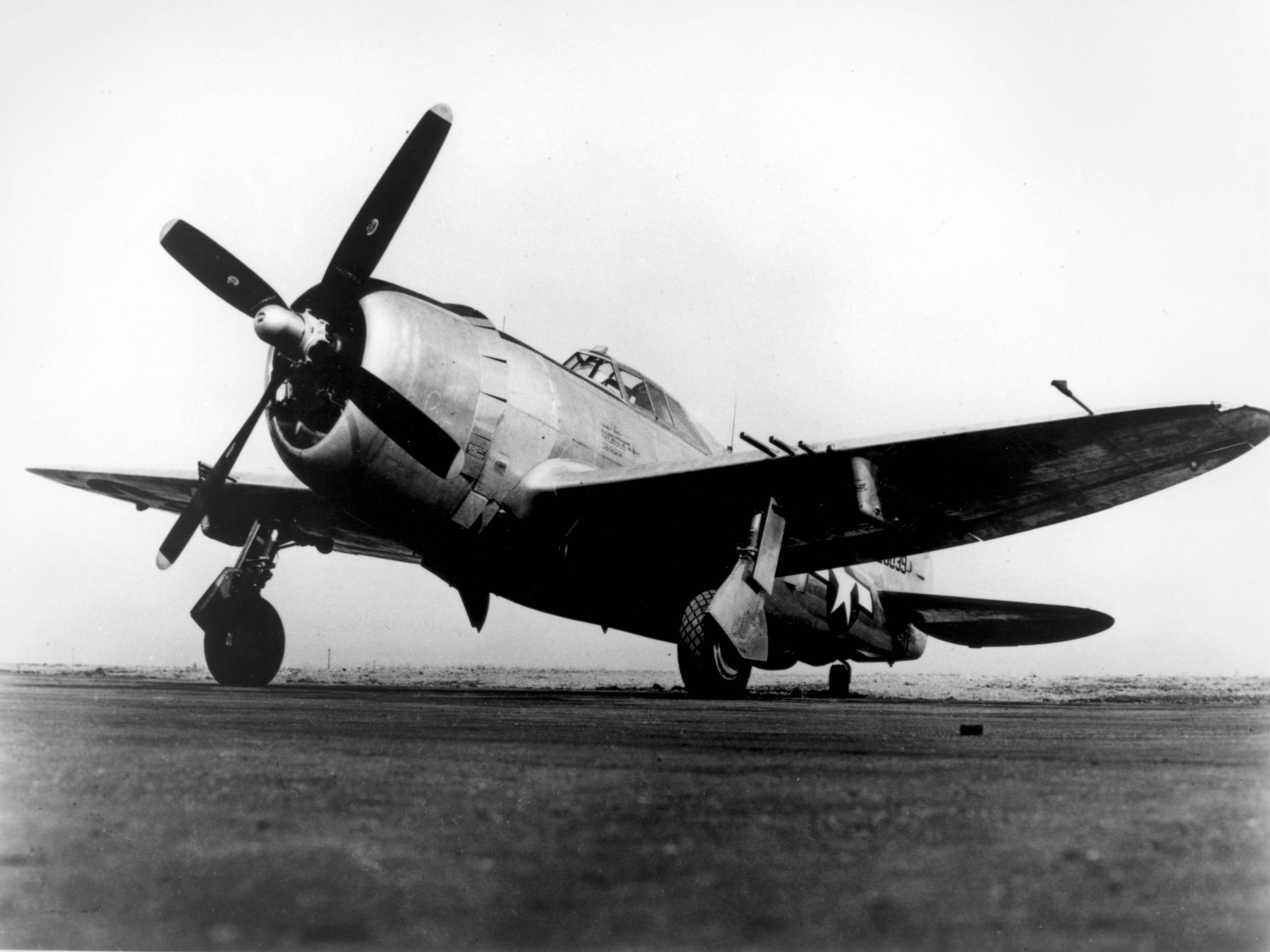
P-47 Thunderbolt as used by the 536th Fighter Squadron for training

The squadron was first established as the 536th Fighter Squadron and was activated in November 1943 at Richmond Army Air Base, Virginia, as one of the four original squadrons of the 87th Fighter Group. The squadron began operations with Republic P-47 Thunderbolts as a Replacement Training Unit (RTU). RTUs were oversized units which trained aircrews prior to their deployment to combat theaters and assignment to an operational group. In January 1944, the squadron and the 537th Fighter Squadron moved to Millville Army Air Field, New Jersey, and the 87th group's headquarters and other squadrons transferred to Camp Springs Army Air Field, Maryland.

However, the Army Air Forces found that standard military units, based on relatively inflexible tables of organization were proving less well adapted to the training mission. Accordingly, a more functional system was adopted in which each base was organized into a separate numbered unit. while the groups and squadrons acting as RTUs were disbanded or inactivated. This resulted in the squadron being disbanded in the spring of 1944 and being replaced by the 135th AAF Base Unit (Fighter), which assumed its mission, personnel, and equipment.

=== Air Force Reserve ===
The reserve mobilization for the Korean War had left the reserve without aircraft. In 1951, Continental Air Command (ConAC) formed the 923rd Reserve Training Wing to train reservists at Atterbury Air Force Base, Indiana. Anticipating the return of mission aircraft to reserve units, ConAC replaced the 923rd Wing with the newly constituted 87th Troop Carrier Wing on 15 June 1952. The squadron was redesignated as the 536th Troop Carrier Squadron, became part of the 87th Wing, and was activated at Atterbury. (Note: The 923d had been activated in 1951 when the reserve 434th Troop Carrier Wing was called to active duty for the Korean War.) The squadron operated Curtiss C-46 Commandos to train reservists. In February 1953 the 434th Troop Carrier Wing, a reserve unit that had been called to active duty in 1951, was released from active duty and activated in the reserve, replacing the 87th Wing, and its 72d Troop Carrier Squadron assumed the mission, personnel and equipment of the 536th.

=== Vietnam War ===
In August 1966, the Air Force and the Army began implementing Project Red Leaf, which would transfer responsibility for the de Havilland Canada C-7 Caribou from the Army to the Air Force following the Johnson-McConnell agreement of 1966. At Vung Tau Air Base, South Vietnam, Air Force personnel began being assigned to the 61st Aviation Company. The Department of Defense had ordered that the 483d Tactical Airlift Wing's new squadrons be located on Air Force installations, not on Army posts, and the cadre of the wing at Cam Ranh Bay Air Base began planning to move squadron level operations operating from small Army camps to permanent sites when the Air Force units were activated. On 1 January 1967, the 457th Squadron was organized and took over Caribou operations from the 61st Company. It maintained a detachment of two planes at Can Tho Airfield A Viet Cong mortar attack on Can Tho on 21 December 1967 damaged two C-7s. This forced a reevaluation of dispersal arrangements and the squadron's planes were withdrawn from Can Tho, although maintenance personnel remained behind.

Operating from Vung Tau Air Base, the 536th earned a Navy Presidential Unit Citation, as well as an Air Force Presidential Unit Citation for airlift support of Khe Sanh and other forward bases from January to May 1968.

In April 1970, the squadron helped break the siege of Dak Seang Special Forces Camp. North Vietnamese forces had surrounded the camp, and learning from the success of air resupply during their 1969 attack on the Ben Het Camp, also established anti-aircraft artillery positions along likely air resupply corridors. On the first day of the siege, two C-7s were diverted from their scheduled missions and staged out of Pleiku to make the first airdrops to the camp. Resupply of the camp was so urgent that all drop-qualified crews of the 483rd Tactical Airlift Wing were ordered to Pleiku to support the operation and eleven sorties were flown that day with cover from Douglas A-1 Skyraiders. Crews approached the camp from the north or south to use terrain to mask their approaches from enemy flak. Loss of the third Caribou in five days, including one from the 457th, prompted a move to resupply the camp with night drops, with cover and illumination provided by Fairchild AC-119 Stinger gunships. All 483rd Wing squadrons participated in the operation. It earned a second Presidential Unit Citation for this action, evacuation of over 2000 refugees from Cambodia, and transportation of the Presidential Southeast Asia Investigation Team to various remote locations in South Vietnam.

== Lineage ==
- Constituted as the 536th Fighter Squadron (Single Engine) on 24 September 1943

Activated on 1 October 1943

- Disbanded on 10 April 1944
- Reconstituted and redesignated 536th Troop Carrier Squadron, Medium on 26 May 1952

Activated in the reserve on 15 June 1952
Inactivated on 1 February 1953

- Redesignated 536th Troop Carrier Squadron and activated on 12 October 1966 (not organized)

Organized on 1 January 1967
Redesignated 536th Tactical Airlift Squadron on 1 August 1967
Inactivated on 15 October 1971

=== Assignments ===
- 87th Fighter Group: 1 October 1943 – 10 April 1944
- 87th Troop Carrier Group: 15 June 1952 – 1 February 1953
- Pacific Air Forces: 12 October 1966 (not organized)
- 483d Troop Carrier Wing (later 483d Tactical Airlift Wing): 1 January 1967 – 15 October 1971

=== Stations ===
- Richmond Army Air Base, Virginia, 1 October 1943
- Millville Army Air Field, New Jersey, 7 January 1944 – 10 April 1944
- Atterbury Air Force Base, Indiana, 15 June 1952 – 1 February 1953
- Vung Tau Air Field, Vietnam, 1 January 1967 – c. 1 July 1970
- Cam Ranh Air Base, Viet Nam, c. 1 July 1970 – 15 October 1971

=== Aircraft ===
- Republic P-47 Thunderbolt, 1943–1944
- Curtiss C-46 Commando, 1952–1953
- DeHavilland Canada C-7A Caribou, 1967–1971

=== Awards and campaigns ===
Award streamer	Award	Dates	Notes
	Presidential Unit Citation	21 January 1968 – 12 May 1968	536th Tactical Airlift Squadron, Viet Nam
	Presidential Unit Citation	1 April 1970 – 30 June 1970	536th Tactical Airlift Squadron, Viet Nam
	Navy Presidential Unit Citation	20 January 1968 – 1 April 1968	536th Tactical Airlift Squadron, Viet Nam
	Air Force Outstanding Unit Award w/Combat "V" Device	1 January 1967 – 30 April 1967	536th Troop Carrier Squadron
	Air Force Outstanding Unit Award w/Combat "V" Device	1 May 1967 – 30 April 1968	536th Troop Carrier Squadron (later Tactical Airlift Squadron)
	Air Force Outstanding Unit Award w/Combat "V" Device	1 July 1970 – 28 August 1971	536th Tactical Airlift Squadron
	Vietnamese Gallantry Cross with Palm	1 January 1967 – 31 August 1971	536th Troop Carrier Squadron (later Tactical Airlift Squadron)

Campaign Streamer	Campaign	Dates	Notes
	Vietnam Air Offensive	1 January 1967 – 8 March 1967	536th Troop Carrier Squadron
	Vietnam Air Offensive, Phase II	9 March 1967 – 31 March 1968	536th Troop Carrier Squadron (later Tactical Airlift Squadron)
	Vietnam Air/Ground	22 January 1968 – 7 July 1968	536th Tactical Airlift Carrier Squadron
	Vietnam Air Offensive, Phase III	1 April 1968 – 31 October 1968	536th Tactical Airlift Carrier Squadron
	Vietnam Air Offensive, Phase IV	1 November 1968 – 22 February 1969	536th Tactical Airlift Carrier Squadron
	Tet 1969/Counteroffensive	23 February 1969 – 8 June 1969	536th Tactical Airlift Carrier Squadron
	Vietnam Summer-Fall 1969	9 June 1969 – 31 October 1969	536th Tactical Airlift Carrier Squadron
	Vietnam Winter-Spring 1970	3 November 1969 – 30 April 1970	536th Tactical Airlift Carrier Squadron
	Sanctuary Counteroffensive	1 May 1970 – 30 June 1970	536th Tactical Airlift Carrier Squadron
	Southwest Monsoon	1 July 1970 – 30 November 1970	536th Tactical Airlift Carrier Squadron
	Commando Hunt V	1 December 1970 – 14 May 1971	536th Tactical Airlift Carrier Squadron
	Commando Hunt VI	15 May 1971 – 31 July 1971	536th Tactical Airlift Carrier Squadron
