= 535th Airlift Squadron =

535th Airlift Squadron

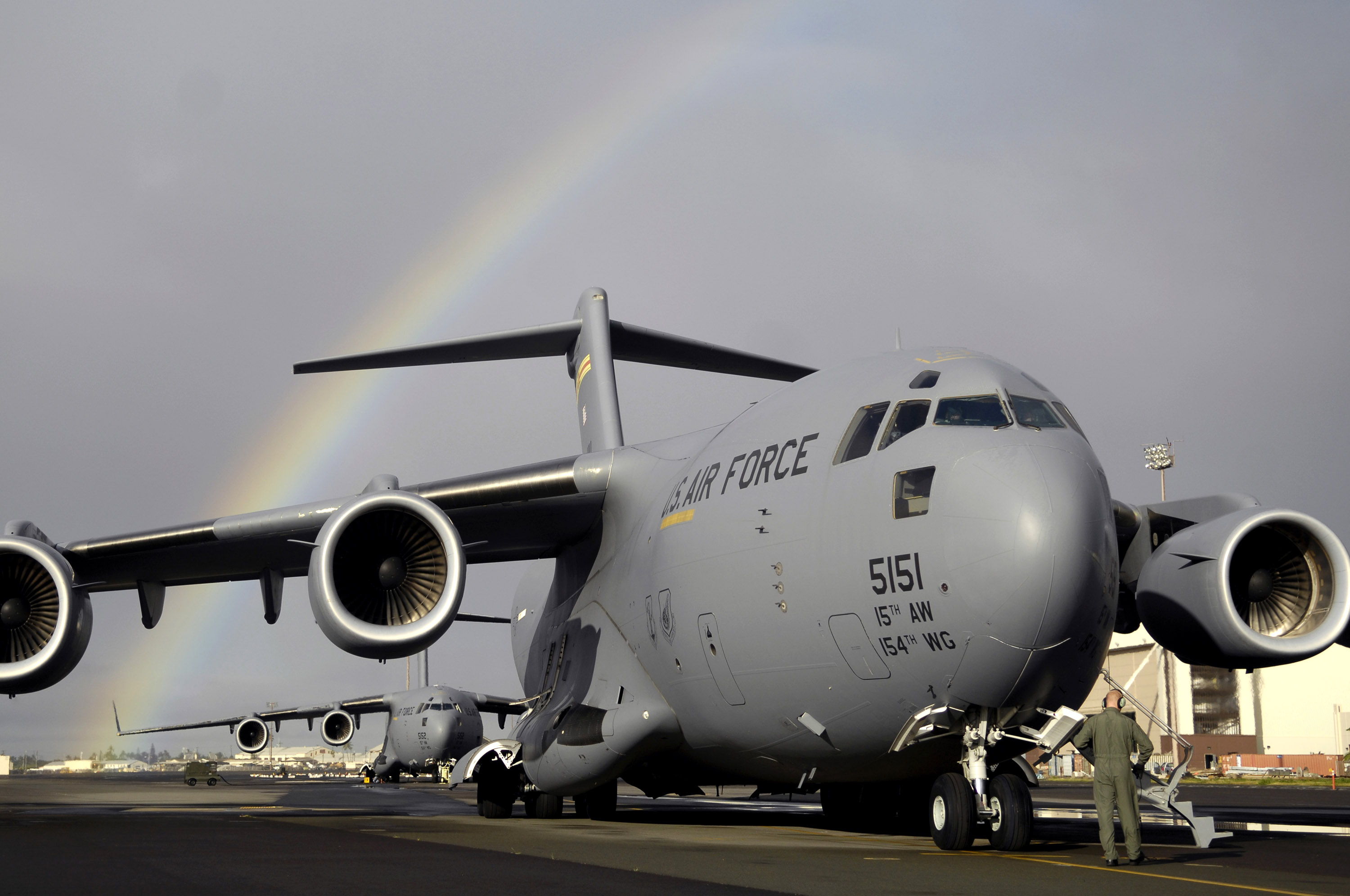
- 535th Airlift Squadron C-17 Globemaster III at Hickam AFB
- Active: 1943–1944; 1949–1951; 1952–1953; 1967–1972; 2005–present
- Country: United States
- Branch: United States Air Force
- Role: Airlift / Airdrop
- Part of: Pacific Air Forces
- Garrison/HQ: Joint Base Pearl Harbor–Hickam
- Nickname: The Tiger Line (Vietnam era)
- Engagements: Vietnam War
- Decorations: Presidential Unit Citation; Air Force Outstanding Unit Award; Republic of Vietnam Gallantry Cross with Palm

Commanders
- Current commander: Lt. Col. Reinier Villanueva

Insignia
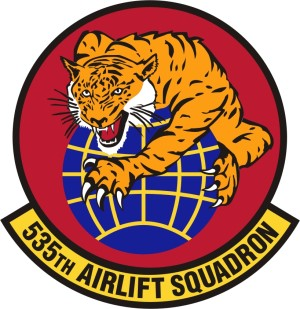
- 535th Airlift Squadron Emblem (Note: Approved 6 April 2007.)

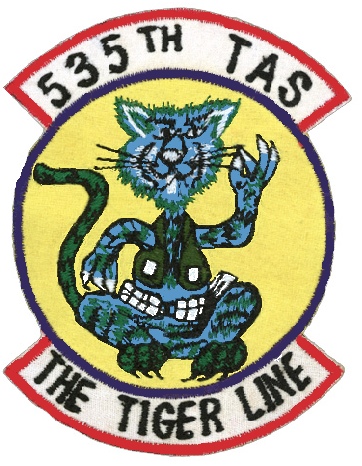
- 535th Tactical Airlift Squadron Emblem (Note: Approved 11 June 1968.)
- Vietnam squadron tail code: KH
- Current squadron tail code: HH

The 535th Airlift Squadron is part of the 15th Wing at Joint Base Pearl Harbor–Hickam, Hawaii. It operates C-17 Globemaster III aircraft providing strategic and tactical airlift in the Indo-Pacific theater.

The squadron was first established during World War II as the 535th Fighter Squadron. It served as a Replacement Training Unit for Republic P-47 Thunderbolt pilots until it was disbanded in a major reorganization of the Army Air Forces in 1944 designed to streamline training organizations. In 1949, the squadron was reactivated in the Air Force Reserve and served as a corollary unit of the active duty 27th Fighter Group and later, as the 535th Fighter-Escort Squadron, of the 12th Fighter-Escort Group until it was ordered to active service in 1951. Its personnel were used to man active duty units and the squadron was inactivated. The squadron was redesignated in 1952 as the 535th Troop Carrier Squadron, and activated at Atterbury Air Force Base to replace elements of the 923d Reserve Training Wing. The following year the squadron was inactivated and replaced at Atterbury by the 71st Troop Carrier Squadron.

The unit was activated again in Vietnam as a de Haviland Canada C-7 Caribou squadron assigned to the 483d Tactical Airlift Wing and the squadron was awarded three Presidential Unit Citations for its actions during the war. The unit was designated the 535th Airlift Squadron and activated in its current role in 2005.

== Mission ==
The 535th operates eight Boeing C-17 Globemaster III aircraft. The squadron executes airlift and airdrop missions to support United States Indo-Pacific Command and United States Transportation Command. The 204th Airlift Squadron of the Hawaii Air National Guard is an associate unit of the 535th, flying the same planes.

== History ==
=== World War II ===
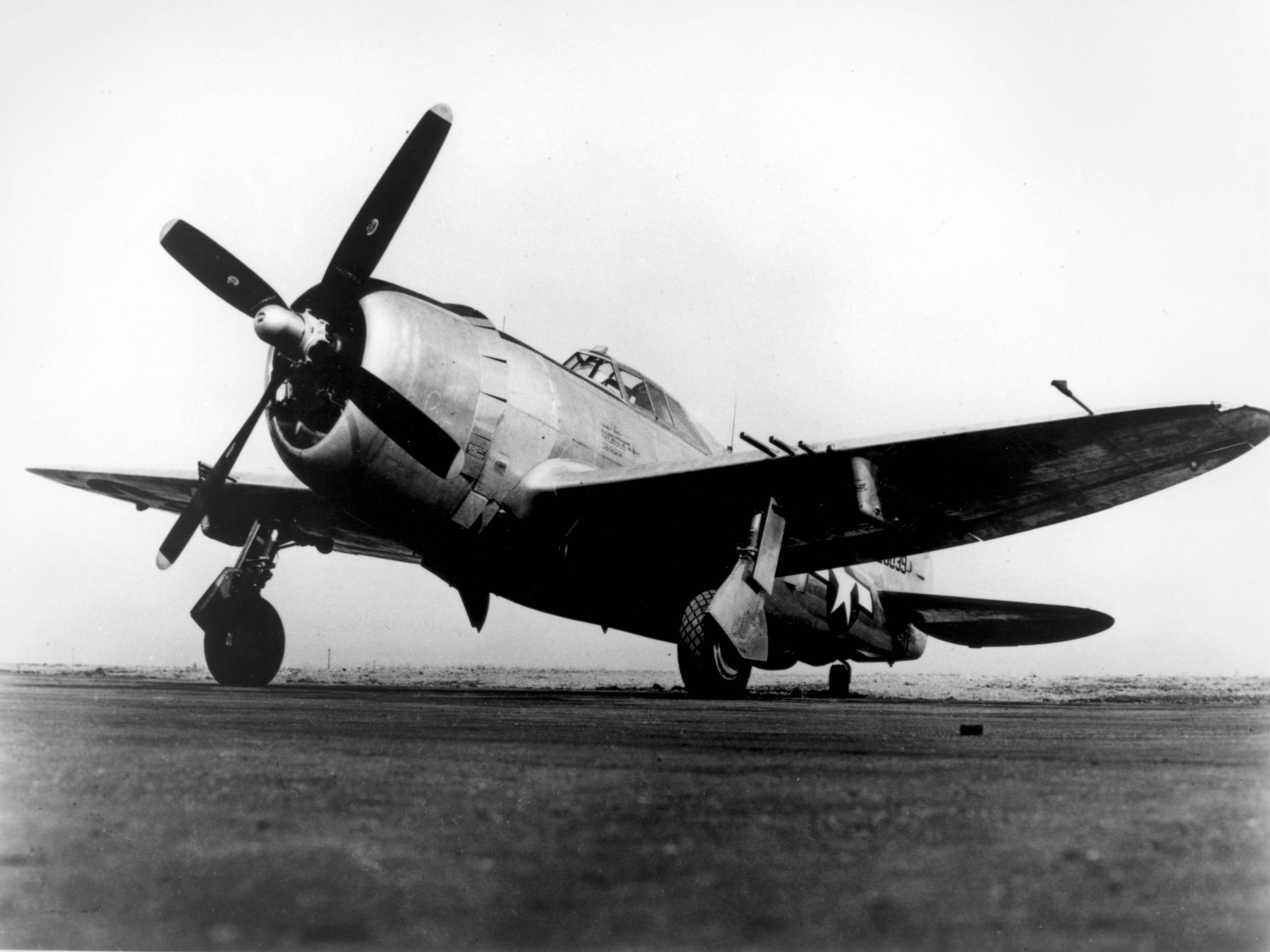
P-47 Thunderbolt as used by the 535th Fighter Squadron for training

The squadron was first established as the 535th Fighter Squadron and was activated in November 1943 at Richmond Army Air Base, Virginia. as one of the four original squadrons of the 87th Fighter Group. The squadron began operations with Republic P-47 Thunderbolts as a Replacement Training Unit (RTU). RTUs were oversized units which trained aircrews prior to their deployment to combat theaters and assignment to an operational group. In January 1944, group headquarters and the squadron moved to Camp Springs Army Air Field, Maryland and the group's remaining squadrons transferred to Millville Army Air Field, New Jersey.

However, the Army Air Forces found that standard military units, based on relatively inflexible tables of organization were proving less well adapted to the training mission. Accordingly, a more functional system was adopted in which each base was organized into a separate numbered unit. while the groups and squadrons acting as RTUs were disbanded or inactivated. This resulted in the squadron being disbanded in the spring of 1944 and being replaced by the 112th AAF Base Unit (Fighter), which assumed its mission, personnel, and equipment.

=== Air Force Reserves ===
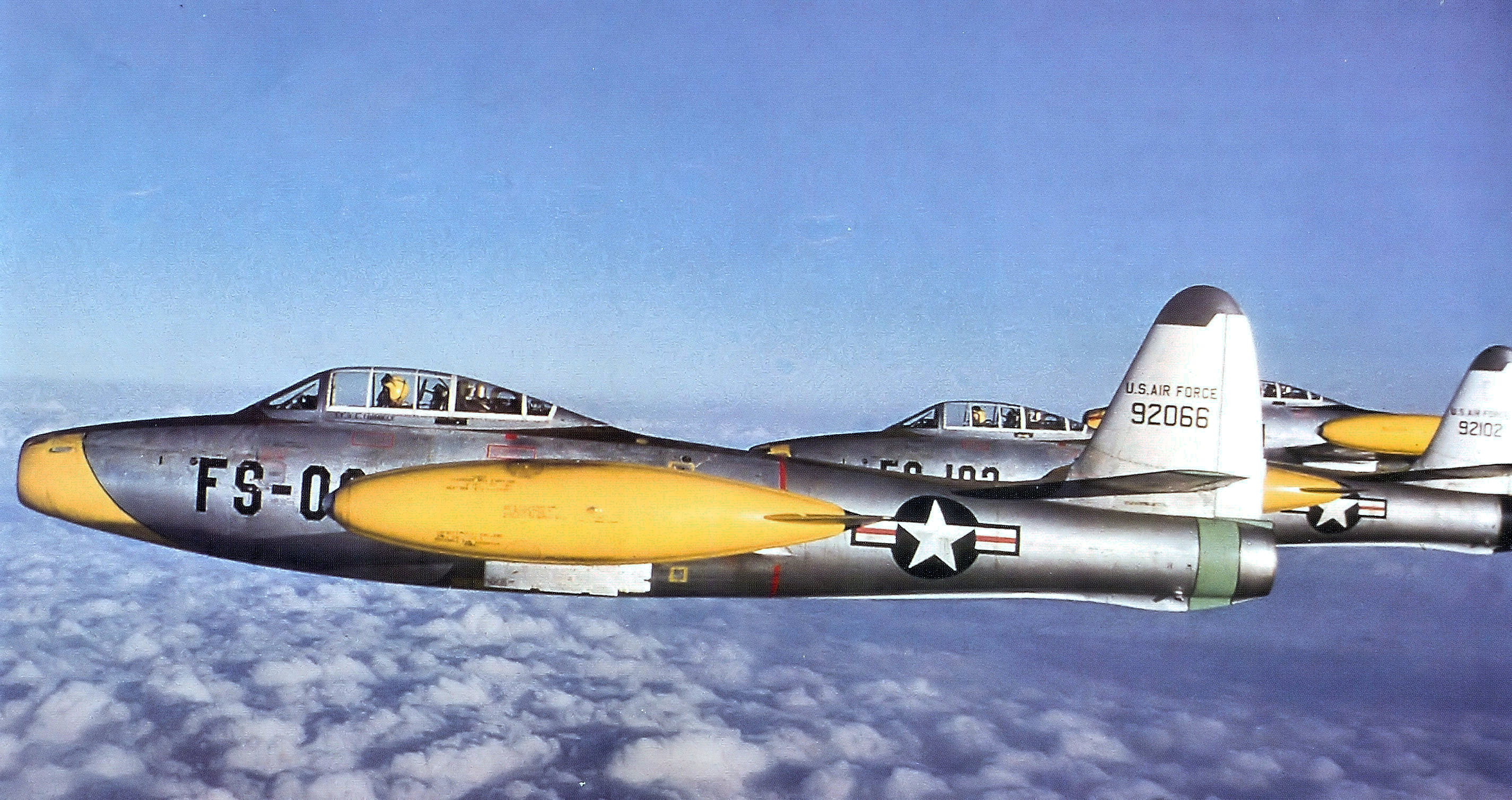
F-84E Thunderjets of the 12th Fighter-Escort Group (Note: Aircraft in foreground is Republic F-84E-1 Thunderjet, serial 49-2066. This plane was transferred to the Air National Guard in 1954 and scrapped in October 1957. Baugher, Joe (7 October 2023). "1949 USAF Serial Numbers". Joe Baugher.)

The May 1949 Air Force Reserve program called for a new type of unit, the Corollary unit, which was a reserve unit integrated with an active duty unit. The plan called for corollary units at 107 locations. It was viewed as the best method to train reservists by mixing them with an existing regular unit to perform duties alongside the regular unit. As part of this program, the 535th was activated at Bergstrom Air Force Base as a corollary unit to Strategic Air Command's 27th Fighter Group. With no aircraft assigned, reservists of the unit flew the North American F-82 Twin Mustangs, and later, the Republic F-84 Thunderjets of the 27th. When most of the 27th Group deployed to Korea for the Korean War, the squadron became affiliated with the 12th Fighter-Escort Group. All reserve corollary units were mobilized for the Korean War. The group was called to active service in May 1951. After its personnel were used to man other units, the squadron was inactivated in June.

The reserve mobilization for the Korean War had left the reserve without aircraft. In 1951, Continental Air Command (ConAC) formed the 923rd Reserve Training Wing to train reservists at Atterbury Air Force Base, Indiana. Anticipating the return of mission aircraft to reserve units, ConAC replaced the 923rd Wing with the newly constituted 87th Troop Carrier Wing on 15 June 1952. The squadron was redesignated as the 535th Troop Carrier Squadron, became part of the 87th Wing, and was activated at Atterbury. (Note: The 923d had been activated in 1951 when the reserve 434th Troop Carrier Wing was called to active duty for the Korean War.) The squadron operated Curtiss C-46 Commandos to train reservists. In February 1953 the 434th Troop Carrier Group, a reserve unit that had been called to active duty in 1951, was released from active duty and activated in the reserve, replacing the 87th Wing, and its 71st Troop Carrier Squadron assumed the mission, personnel and equipment of the 535th.

=== Vietnam War ===
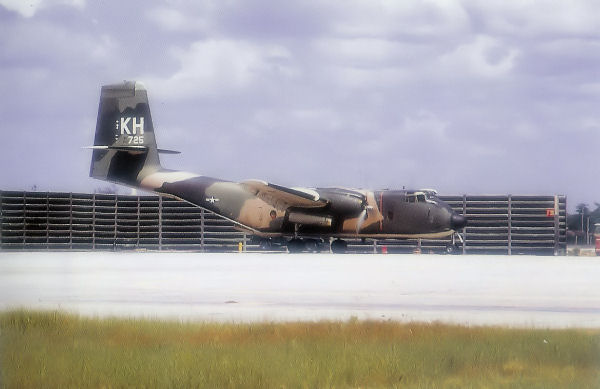
DeHavilland C-7A of the 535th Tactical Airlift Squadron at Cam Rahn Bay in 1971

In August 1966, the Air Force and the Army began implementing Project Red Leaf, which would transfer responsibility for the de Havilland Canada C-7 Caribou from the Army to the Air Force following the Johnson-McConnell agreement of 1966. At Vung Tau Air Base, South Vietnam, Air Force personnel began being assigned to the 57th Aviation Company. The Department of Defense had ordered that the 483d Tactical Airlift Wing's new squadrons be located on Air Force installations, not on Army posts, and the cadre of the wing at Cam Ranh Bay Air Base began planning to move squadron level operations operating from small Army camps to permanent sites when the Air Force units were activated. On 1 January 1967, the 457th Squadron was organized and took over Caribou operations from the 57th Company.

The squadron operated from several locations in addition to its primary base at Vung Tau Air Base. The 535th airlifted routine cargo and passengers, provided support for Army special forces and radio relay for ground units, airdropped troops and cargo, performed emergency resupply and medical evacuation, and flew other combat airlift missions. It earned a Navy Presidential Unit Citation, as well as an Air Force Presidential Unit Citation for airlift support of Khe Sanh and other forward bases from January to May 1968.

In April 1970, the squadron helped break the siege of Dak Seang Special Forces Camp. North Vietnamese forces had surrounded the camp, and learning from the success of air resupply during their 1969 attack on the Ben Het Camp, also established anti-aircraft artillery positions along likely air resupply corridors. On the first day of the siege, two C-7s were diverted from their scheduled missions and staged out of Pleiku to make the first airdrops to the camp. Resupply of the camp was so urgent that all drop-qualified crews of the 483rd Tactical Airlift Wing were ordered to Pleiku to support the operation and eleven sorties were flown that day with cover from Douglas A-1 Skyraiders. Crews approached the camp from the north or south to use terrain to mask their approaches from enemy flak. Loss of the third Caribou in five days, including one from the 458th, prompted a move to resupply the camp with night drops, with cover and illumination provided by Fairchild AC-119 Stinger gunships. All 483rd Wing squadrons participated in the operation. It earned a second Presidential Unit Citation for this action, evacuation of over 2000 refugees from Cambodia, and transportation of the Presidential Southeast Asia Investigation Team to various remote locations in South Vietnam. The squadron flew its last combat mission the day it was inactivated.

=== Pacific airlift ===
The squadron was reactivated in 2005 as the 535th Airlift Squadron at Hickam Air Force Base to provide strategic and tactical airlift in the Pacific. It became the first unit located outside the Continental United States to fly the C-17 conducting strategic and tactical airlift. It conducts night vision goggle, low-level, air refueling and austere-airfield operations from within the world's largest area of responsibility. The squadron has provided support for and operated in Operation Enduring Freedom, Operation Iraqi Freedom, and Operation New Dawn. Additionally, the squadron has provided emergency humanitarian relief to Haiti, Pakistan, Samoa, Kwajalein, Indonesia and Japan.

== Lineage ==
- Constituted as the 535th Fighter Squadron (Single Engine) on 24 September 1943

Activated on 1 November 1943

- Disbanded on 10 April 1944
- Redesignated 535th Fighter Squadron, Twin Engine on 16 May 1949

Activated in the reserve on 27 June 1949

- Redesignated 535th Fighter-Escort Squadron on 16 March 1950

Ordered into active service on 1 May 1951
Inactivated on 25 June 1951

- Redesignated 535th Troop Carrier Squadron, Medium on 26 May 1952

Activated in the reserve on 15 June 1952
Inactivated on 1 February 1953

- Redesignated 535th Troop Carrier Squadron and activated on 12 October 1966 (not organized)

Organized on 1 January 1967

- Redesignated 535th Tactical Airlift Squadron on 1 August 1967

Inactivated on 24 January 1972

- Redesignated 535th Airlift Squadron on 1 April 2005

Activated on 18 April 2005

=== Commanders ===
Capt George G. Dewey, 6 October 1943; Maj George V. Williams, 3–10 Apr 1944; Lt Col Leo J. Ehmann, 1 January 1967; Lt Col Edwin B. Owens, 4 January 1967; Lt Col Joseph Faulkner, 15 December 1967; Lt Col Harry F. Hunter, 21 June 1968; Lt Col Richard D. Kimball, 12 April 1969; Lt Col Clem B. Myers, 1 November 1969; Lt Col John J. Hanley, 13 November 1969; Lt Col John D. Pennekamp, 18 July 1970; Lt Col Thomas D. Moyle, 3 October 1970; Lt Col Rupert S. Richardson, 31 December 1970; Lt Col Dean S. Downing, 12 September 1971; Lt Col James S. Knox, 8 Dec 1971 – 24 Jan 1972; Lt Col Chris Davis 2005–2006; Lt Col Scott Shapiro 2006–2008; Lt Col Casey Eaton 2008–2009; Lt Col Andy Leshikar 2009–2011; Lt Col Pat Winstead 2011–2013; Lt Col Gregg Johnson 2013–2015; Lt Col Scott Raleigh 2015–2017; Lt Col Chad Cisewski 2017–2019; Lt Col Joshua Holaday 2019–2021; Lt Col Paul Tucker 2021-2023; Lt Col E. Logan Sutton 2023-2025; Lt. Col. Reinier Villanueva 2025-present (Note: Unknown commanders 27 June 1949 – 25 June 1951 and 15 June 1952 – 1 February 1953.)

=== Assignments ===
- 87th Fighter Group: 1 November 1943 – 10 April 1944
- 87th Fighter Group (later 87th Fighter-Escort Group): 27 June 1949 – 25 June 1951
- 87th Troop Carrier Group: 15 June 1952 – 1 February 1953
- Pacific Air Forces: 12 October 1966 (not organized)
- 483d Troop Carrier Wing (later 483d Tactical Airlift Wing): 1 January 1967 – 24 January 1972
- 15th Operations Group 18 April 2005 – present

=== Stations ===
- Richmond Army Air Base, Virginia, 1 November 1943
- Camp Springs Army Air Field, Maryland, 21 January 1944 – 10 April 1944
- Bergstrom Air Force Base, Texas, 27 June 1949 – 25 June 1951
- Atterbury Air Force Base, Indiana, 15 June 1952 – 1 February 1953
- Vung Tau Airfield, South Vietnam, 1 January 1967
- Cam Ranh Air Base, South Vietnam, 21 January 1970 – 24 January 1972
- Hickam Air Force Base (later Joint Base Pearl Harbor–Hickam), Hawaii, 18 April 2005 – present

=== Aircraft ===
- Republic P-47 Thunderbolt (1943–1944)
- Douglas A-24 Banshee (1943–1944)
- North American F-82 Twin Mustang (1949–1950)
- North American T-6 Texan (1950)
- Lockheed T-33 Shooting Star (1950)
- Republic F-84 Thunderjet (1950–1951)
- Curtiss C-46 Commando (1952–1953)
- de Havilland Canada C-7 Caribou (1967–1972)
- Boeing C-17 Globemaster III (2005–present)

=== Awards and campaigns ===
Award streamer	Award	Dates	Notes
	Presidential Unit Citation	21 January 1968 – 12 May 1968	535th Tactical Airlift Squadron, Viet Nam
	Presidential Unit Citation	1 April 1970 – 30 June 1970	535th Tactical Airlift Squadron, Viet Nam
	Navy Presidential Unit Citation	20 January 1968 – 31 March 1968	535th Tactical Airlift Squadron, Viet Nam
	Air Force Outstanding Unit Award w/Combat "V" Device	1 January 1967 – 30 April 1967	535th Troop Carrier Squadron
	Air Force Outstanding Unit Award w/Combat "V" Device	1 May 1967 – 30 April 1968	535th Troop Carrier Squadron (later Tactical Airlift Squadron)
	Air Force Outstanding Unit Award w/Combat "V" Device	1 July 1970 – 31 December 1971	535th Tactical Airlift Squadron
	Air Force Outstanding Unit Award	1 November 2006 – 31 October 2007	535th Airlift Squadron
	Vietnamese Gallantry Cross with Palm	1 January 1967 – 24 January 1972	535th Troop Carrier Squadron (later Tactical Airlift Squadron)

Campaign Streamer	Campaign	Dates	Notes
	Vietnam Air Offensive	1 January 1967 – 8 March 1967	535th Troop Carrier Squadron
	Vietnam Air Offensive, Phase II	9 March 1967 – 31 March 1968	535th Troop Carrier Squadron (later Tactical Airlift Squadron)
	Vietnam Air/Ground	22 January 1968 – 7 July 1968	535th Tactical Airlift Carrier Squadron
	Vietnam Air Offensive, Phase III	1 April 1968 – 31 October 1968	535th Tactical Airlift Carrier Squadron
	Vietnam Air Offensive, Phase IV	1 November 1968 – 22 February 1969	535th Tactical Airlift Carrier Squadron
	Tet 1969/Counteroffensive	23 February 1969 – 8 June 1969	535th Tactical Airlift Carrier Squadron
	Vietnam Summer-Fall 1969	9 June 1969 – 31 October 1969	535th Tactical Airlift Carrier Squadron
	Vietnam Winter-Spring 1970	3 November 1969 – 30 April 1970	535th Tactical Airlift Carrier Squadron
	Sanctuary Counteroffensive	1 May 1970 – 30 June 1970	535th Tactical Airlift Carrier Squadron
	Southwest Monsoon	1 July 1970 – 30 November 1970	535th Tactical Airlift Carrier Squadron
	Commando Hunt V	1 December 1970 – 14 May 1971	535th Tactical Airlift Carrier Squadron
	Commando Hunt VI	15 May 1971 – 31 July 1971	535th Tactical Airlift Carrier Squadron
	Commando Hunt VII	1 November 1971 – 29 March 1972	535th Tactical Airlift Carrier Squadron
