= 87th Troop Carrier Group =

87th Troop Carrier Group

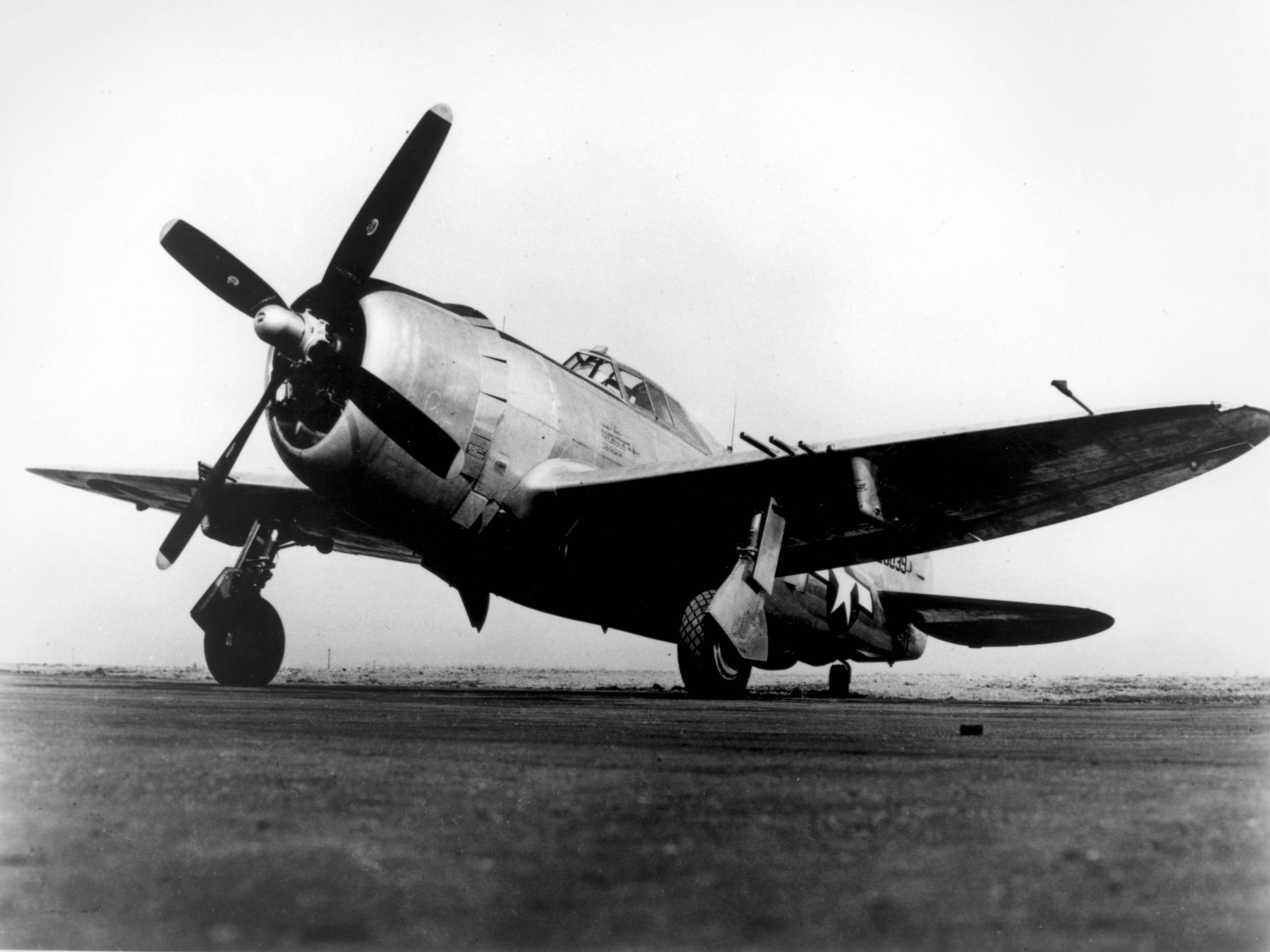
- P-47 Thunderbolt as used by the 87th Fighter Group during World War II
- Active: 1943–1944; 1949–1951; 1952–1953
- Country: United States
- Branch: United States Air Force

The 87th Troop Carrier Group is an inactive United States Air Force unit. It was last assigned to the 87th Troop Carrier Wing at Atterbury Air Force Base, Indiana where it was inactivated on 1 February 1953.

The group was first activated as the 87th Pursuit Group in 1942 at Selfridge Field, Michigan, but was inactivated almost immediately because the Army Air Corps had exceeded the number of pursuit units authorized, and the group was disbanded five days after it was activated. It remained in this state until 1979 when it was consolidated with the 87th Troop Carrier Group in inactive status.

In the fall of 1943, a new unit, the 87th Fighter Group was activated at Richmond Army Air Base, Virginia to serve as a replacement training unit. It served as a Republic P-47 Thunderbolt replacement training unit under First Air Force until 1944 when it was disbanded in a general reorganization of Army Air Forces training units.

In 1949, the group was reactivated in the Air Force Reserve and served as a corollary unit of the active duty 27th Fighter Group and later, as the 87th Fighter-Escort Group, of the 12th Fighter-Escort Group until it was ordered to active service in 1951. Its personnel were used to man active duty units and the group was inactivated two months after being called up.

The group was redesignated in 1952 as the 87th Troop Carrier Group, and activated at Atterbury Air Force Base to replace the 923d Reserve Training Wing. the following year the group was inactivated and replaced at Atterbury by the 434th Troop Carrier Group.

== History ==
=== World War II ===
==== 87th Pursuit Group ====
Shortly after the Japanese Attack on Pearl Harbor, as the Army Air Corps was expanding, Third Air Force activated the 87th Pursuit Group at Selfridge Field, Michigan. However, the group was disbanded almost immediately because the Army Air Corps had exceeded the number of pursuit units authorized, and the group was disbanded five days after it was activated. The same happened to the 304th, 305th, and 306th Pursuit Squadrons that had been assigned to the group The pursuit group remained disbanded until 1979 when it was consolidated with the 87th Troop Carrier Group in inactive status.

==== 87th Fighter Group ====
The 87th Fighter Group was activated the following year at Richmond Army Air Base with the 450th, 535th, 536th, and 537th Fighter Squadrons assigned. The group began operations with Republic P-47 Thunderbolts as a Replacement Training Unit (RTU). RTUs were oversized units which trained aircrews prior to their deployment to combat theaters and assignment to an operational group. In January 1944, the group began a split operation when group headquarters and the 450th and the 535th squadrons moved to Camp Springs Army Air Field, Maryland, and the remaining squadrons transferred to Millville Army Air Field, New Jersey. The 450th Squadron did not become operational until the move to Camp Springs.

However, the Army Air Forces found that standard military units, based on relatively inflexible tables of organization were proving less well adapted to the training mission. Accordingly, a more functional system was adopted in which each base was organized into a separate numbered unit. while the groups and squadrons acting as RTUs were disbanded or inactivated. This resulted in the 87th, along with the 450th Squadron at Camp Springs, being disbanded in the spring of 1944 and being replaced by the 112th AAF Base Unit (Fighter), which assumed the group's mission, personnel, and equipment. The 535th was replaced by the 125th AAF Base Unit (Fighter), and the two squadrons at Millville were rolled into the 135th AAF Base Unit (Fighter).

=== Air Force Reserves ===
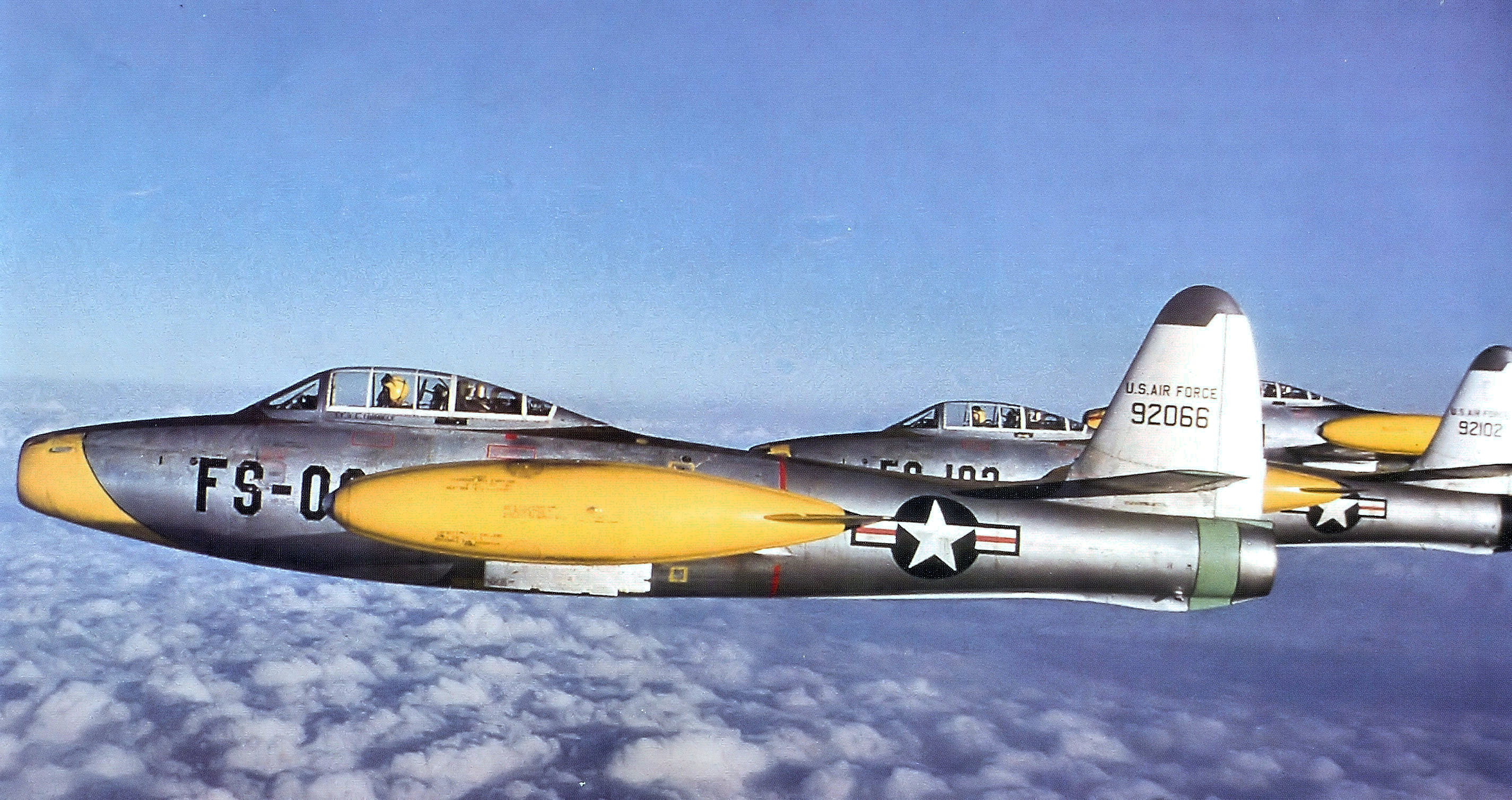
F-84E Thunderjets of the 12th Fighter-Escort Group

The group was reactivated in 1949 in the Air Force Reserve at Bergstrom Air Force Base as a corollary unit to Strategic Air Command's 27th Fighter Group with one operational squadron and two support units. With no aircraft assigned, reservists of the unit flew the North American F-82 Twin Mustangs, and later, the Republic F-84 Thunderjets of the 27th. When most of the 27th group deployed to Korea for the Korean War, the group became affiliated with the 12th Fighter-Escort Group. The group was called to active service in May 1951. After its personnel were used to man other units, the group was inactivated in June.

In 1952 the group was redesignated as the 87th Troop Carrier Group, and assigned to the newly constituted 87th Troop Carrier Wing under the wing base organization system and activated at Atterbury Air Force Base. The 87th wing replaced the 923d Reserve Training Wing at Atterbury when reserve flying operations resumed there. The group operated a mix of aircraft to train reservists. In February 1953 the 434th Troop Carrier Group was released from active duty and activated in the reserves, assuming the mission, personnel and equipment of the group.

== Lineage ==
87th Pursuit Group

- Constituted as the 87th Pursuit Group (Interceptor) on 13 January 1942

Activated on 10 February 1942
Disbanded on 15 February 1942

- Reconstituted in 1979 and consolidated with the 87th Troop Carrier Group as the 87th Troop Carrier Group

87th Tactical Airlift Group

- Constituted as the 87th Fighter Group (Single Engine) on 24 September 1943

Activated on 1 October 1943
Disbanded on 10 April 1944

- Reconstituted on 16 May 1949 and allotted to the reserve

Activated on 27 June 1949
Redesignated 87th Fighter-Escort Group on 16 March 1950
Ordered into active service on 1 May 1951
Inactivated on 25 June 1951

- Redesignated 87th Troop Carrier Group, Medium on 26 May 1952 and allotted to the reserve

Activated on 15 June 1952
Inactivated on 1 February 1953

- Consolidated with the 87th Pursuit Group in 1979

Redesignated 87th Tactical Airlift Group on 31 July 1985 (not active)

=== Assignments ===
- III Interceptor Command: 10 February 1942 – 15 February 1942
- I Fighter Command, 1 October 1943 – 10 April 1944 (attached to Philadelphia Air Defense Wing until c. December 1943)
- Eighth Air Force, 27 June 1949 – 25 June 1951 (attached to 27th Fighter Group (later 27th Fighter-Escort Group) until 5 December 1950; 12 Fighter Escort Group until 25 June 1951)
- 87th Troop Carrier Wing, 15 June 1952 – 1 February 1953

=== Components ===
- 87th Communications Squadron, 27 June 1949 – 25 June 1951
- 87th Finance Disbursing Unit, 27 June 1949 – 16 March 1950
- 304th Pursuit Squadron, 10 February 1942 – 15 February 1942
- 305th Pursuit Squadron, 10 February 1942 – 15 February 1942
- 306th Pursuit Squadron, 10 February 1942 – 15 February 1942
- 450th Fighter Squadron, 1 October 1943 – 10 April 1944
- 535th Fighter Squadron (later Fighter-Escort Squadron, Troop Carrier Squadron), 1 October 1943 – 10 April 1944; 27 June 1949 – 25 June 1951; 15 June 1952 – 1 February 1953
- 536th Fighter Squadron (later Troop Carrier Squadron), 1 October 1943 – 10 April 1944; 15 June 1952 – 1 February 1953

Millville Army Air Field, New Jersey, 7 January 1944 – 10 April 1944

- 537th Fighter Squadron (later Troop Carrier Squadron), 1 October 1943 – 10 April 1944; 15 June 1952 – 1 February 1953

Millville Army Air Field, New Jersey, 7 January 1944 – 10 April 1944

=== Stations ===
- Richmond Army Air Base, Virginia, 1 October 1943
- Camp Springs Army Air Field, Maryland, 21 January 1944 – 10 April 1944
- Bergstrom Air Force Base, Texas, 27 June 1949 – 25 June 1951
- Atterbury Air Force Base, Indiana, 15 June 1952 – 1 February 1953

=== Aircraft ===
- Douglas A-24 Banshee, 1943–1944
- Republic P-47 Thunderbolt, 1943–1944
- North American F-82 Twin Mustang, 1949–1950
- North American T-6 Texan, 1950
- Lockheed T-33 Shooting Star, 1950
- Republic F-84 Thunderjet, 1950–1951
- North American B-25 Mitchell, 1952–1953
- Curtiss C-46 Commando, 1952–1953
- Douglas C-47 Skytrain, 1952–1953
- North American T-6 Texan, 1953
- Beechcraft T-7, 1952–1953
