= 450th Fighter Squadron =

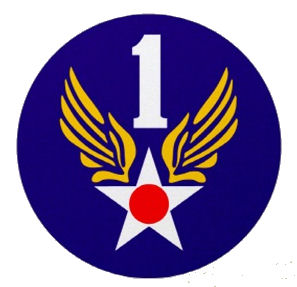
450th Fighter Squadron

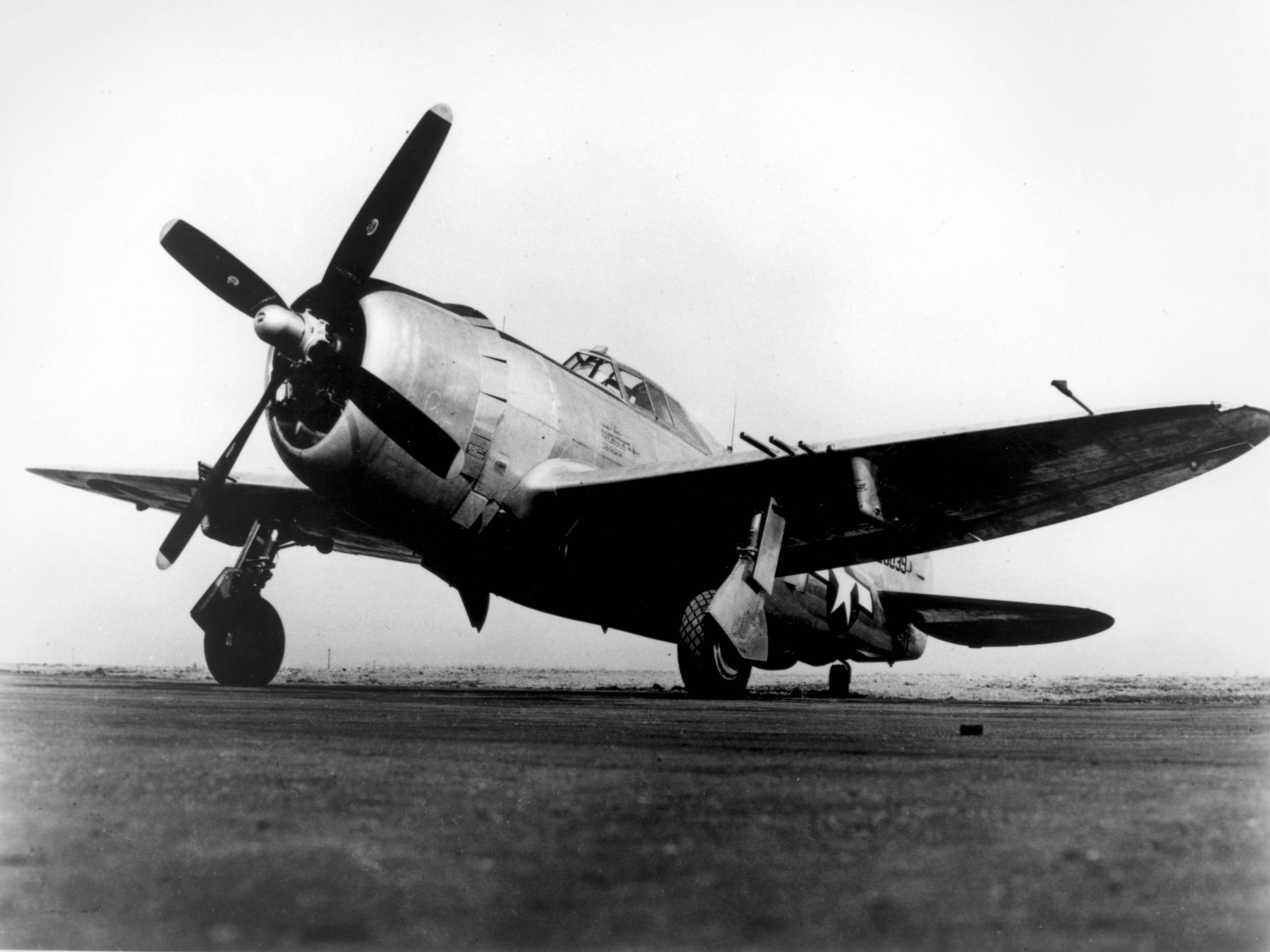
- P-47 Thunderbolt as used by the 450th Fighter Squadron for training
- Active: 1943–1944
- Country: United States
- Branch: United States Army Air Forces
- Role: Fighter Training

The 450th Fighter Squadron was established during World War II as a Replacement Training Unit for Republic P-47 Thunderbolt pilots until it was disbanded in a major reorganization of the Army Air Forces in 1944 designed to streamline training organizations.

== History ==
The squadron was established as the 450th Fighter Squadron and was activated in November 1943 at Richmond Army Air Base, Virginia. as one of the four original squadrons of the 87th Fighter Group. The squadron began operations with Republic P-47 Thunderbolts in January 1944 as a Replacement Training Unit (RTU). RTUs were oversized units which trained aircrews prior to their deployment to combat theaters and assignment to an operational group. In January 1944, group headquarters and the squadron moved to Camp Springs Army Air Field, Maryland, and two of the group's other squadrons transferred to Millville Army Air Field, New Jersey.

However, the Army Air Forces found that standard military units, based on relatively inflexible tables of organization were proving less well adapted to the training mission. Accordingly, a more functional system was adopted in which each base was organized into a separate numbered unit. while the groups and squadrons acting as RTUs were disbanded or inactivated. This resulted in the squadron being disbanded in the spring of 1944 and being replaced by the 112th AAF Base Unit (Fighter), which assumed its mission, personnel, and equipment.

== Lineage ==
- Constituted as the 450th Fighter Squadron (Single Engine) on 24 September 1943

Activated on 1 November 1943

- Disbanded on 10 April 1944

=== Assignments ===
- 87th Fighter Group: 1 November 1943 – 10 April 1944

=== Stations ===
- Richmond Army Air Base, Virginia, 1 November 1943
- Camp Springs Army Air Field, Maryland, 21 January 1944 – 10 April 1944

=== Aircraft ===
- Republic P-47 Thunderbolt (1943–1944)
