= Phù Cát Air Base =

Airbase in Vietnam

Phù Cát Air Base
- Part of Vietnam People's Air Force (PVAF); Republic of Vietnam Air Force (RVNAF); Pacific Air Forces (USAF)
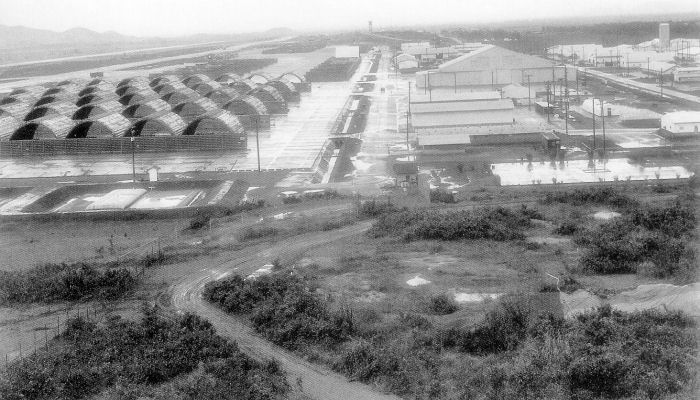
- Phù Cát Air Base in 1971

Site information
- Type: Air Force Base
- Condition: Joint Civil/Military Airport

Location
- Location of Phù Cát Air Base in Vietnam
- Coordinates: 13°57′18″N 109°02′32″E

Site history
- Built: 1966
- Built by: US Air Force
- In use: 1966–present
- Battles/wars: Vietnam War

Airfield information
- IATA: UIH; ICAO: VVPC

Summary
- Elevation AMSL: 79 ft (24 m)
- Interactive map of Airfield information

Runways
Direction	Length		Surface
Direction	ft	m	Surface
	10,000	3,048	asphalt

Phù Cát Air Base (Vietnamese: Căn cứ không quân Phù Cát) is an airbase built by the United States Air Force (USAF) and Republic of Vietnam Air Force (RVNAF), used during the Vietnam War (1959–1975). It is located north of the city of Qui Nhơn in southern Vietnam and serves the Vietnam Air Defence - Air Force (VNADAF).

== USAF use ==
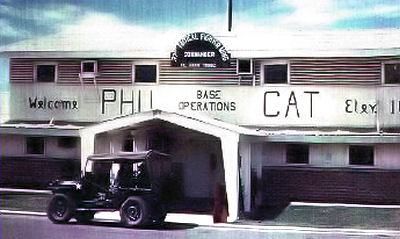
The Phù Cát base operations building in 1968

In late 1965, with the buildup of U.S. airpower in South Vietnam, the existing air bases were becoming overcrowded. In September, plans to build an air base at Qui Nhon were suspended when the site conditions were found to be unsuitable. In January 1966 a site in Phù Cát District 24 km north of Qui Nhon was identified. In late February 1966 Military Assistance Command, Vietnam decided to build a new jet-capable base at Phù Cát. In April 1966 forces from the Republic of Korea Army Tiger Division secured the area for base construction, with the construction crews arriving in May. The Vietcong harassed construction, with booby-traps and sniper fire killing three Korean soldiers.

On 23 December 1966 USAF units began moving to the half-completed base. At this time the runway was a 3,000-foot (910 m) long dirt strip while the taxiways and parking areas were covered in Pierced steel planking (PSP). The 459th and 537th Troop Carrier Squadrons both equipped with C-7A Caribous began operations from the base on 1 January 1967. Base facilities by this time included wooden barracks, a mess hall, recreation facilities and utilities. By late March 1967 a 10,000-foot (3,000 m) by 125-foot (38 m) asphalt runway together with sealed taxiways and parking aprons had been completed. Later in the year a fuel line was constructed to the base, from a tank facility on the outskirts of Qui Nhon.

On 1 April 1967 the 1883d Communications Squadron of the 1964th Communications Group, Air Force Communications Service, officially arrived at Phu Cat from Qui Nhon.

The 37th Tactical Fighter Wing (37th TFW) began operations from the base in April 1967. The 37th TFW comprised the following F-100 Super Sabre equipped squadrons:

- 416th Tactical Fighter Squadron (416th TFS), transferred from the 3rd Tactical Fighter Wing at Bien Hoa Air Base
- Detachment 1, 612th Tactical Fighter Squadron (612th TFS), transferred from the 35th Tactical Fighter Wing at Phan Rang Air Base

While based at Phù Cát, a detachment from the 416th TFS pioneered fast Forward Air Control (FAC) operations using two-seat F-100Fs under the code-name Commando Sabre and the call sign Misty.

In September 1967 a detachment from the 4th Air Commando Squadron equipped with 4 AC-47 Spooky gunships began operating from the base. In September 1969 the 4th Air Commando Squadron ceased operating from the base and moved its forward operating base to Da Nang Air Base.

On 3 February 1968 the 355th Tactical Fighter Squadron (355th TFS) was attached to the 37th TFW. On 5 May 1968 the 174th Tactical Fighter Squadron (174th TFS), an Iowa Air National Guard unit equipped with F-100Cs deployed to Phù Cát AB.

Detachment 13 of the 38th Air Rescue Squadron was established at the base, renamed Detachment 13, 3d Aerospace Rescue and Recovery Group in July 1971. Detachment 13 remained at Phu Cat until November 1971 when it was inactivated.

On 13 April 1969, Detachment 1 612th TFS left the base and was replaced by the 480th Tactical Fighter Squadron equipped with F-4D Phantom II combat aircraft which moved from Da Nang AB. On 11 May the 174th TFS returned to the US, followed by the 355th TFS on 15 May. On 27 May the 416th TFS transferred to Tuy Hoa Air Base and the Commando Sabre Fast FACs were inactivated.

On 24 June the 389th Tactical Fighter Squadron equipped with F-4Ds transferred to the base from Da Nang AB. In November B Flight, 18th Special Operations Squadron (18th SOS) equipped with three AC-119K Stinger gunships deployed to the base where they operated primarily against supply routes in Laos. During 1969 40 concrete and steel "Wonderarch" aircraft shelters were constructed at the base.

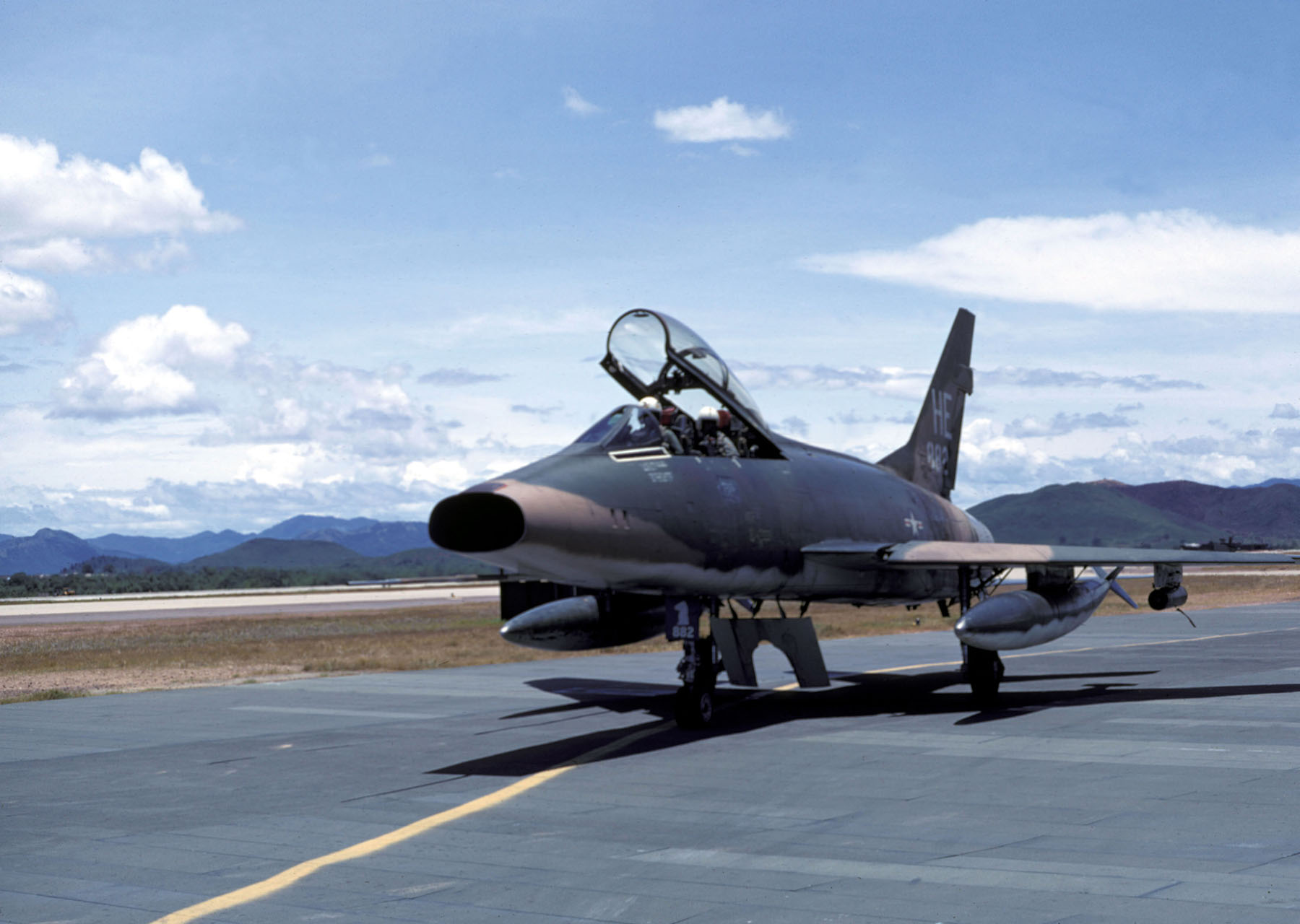
A 416th TFS F-100F at Phù Cát

On 1 February 1970 the base was hit by a People's Army of Vietnam (PAVN) rocket attack, killing one airman and wounding 15 others. In March, B Flight 18th SOS moved to Da Nang AB. A Flight 17th Special Operations Squadron (17th SOS) equipped with AC-119G Shadows moving from Tuy Hoa Air Base replaced them at Phù Cát AB. On 1 April the 37th TFW was inactivated and redesignated as the 12th Tactical Fighter Wing (12th TFW).

In June the 459th Troop Carrier Squadron was inactivated. The 537th Troop Carrier Squadron was inactivated during the year, with its aircraft transferred to the South Vietnamese. On 29 December "A" Flight, 17th SOS, was inactivated and its aircraft transferred to B Flight at Phan Rang AB.

On 31 August 1971 the 361st Tactical Electronic Warfare Squadron equipped with EC-47N/Ps departed from the base. On 8 October, the 389th TFS flew its last combat mission. On 26 October its aircraft began returning to the United States. On 20 October the 480th TFS flew its and the 12th TFW's last combat mission. On 17 November 1971 the 12th TFW was inactivated. On 30 November 1971 the 1883d Communications Squadron was reassigned and moved to Kincheloe Air Force Base, Michigan. On 5 December 1971 the base was formally turned over to the RVNAF.

== RVNAF use ==
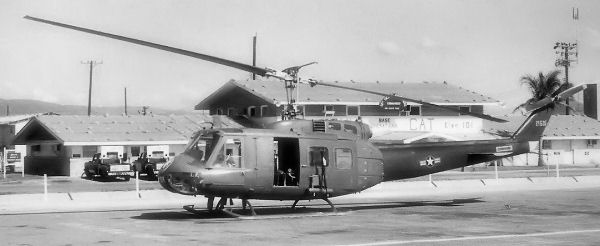
A VNAF UH-1 at Phù Cát c.1970

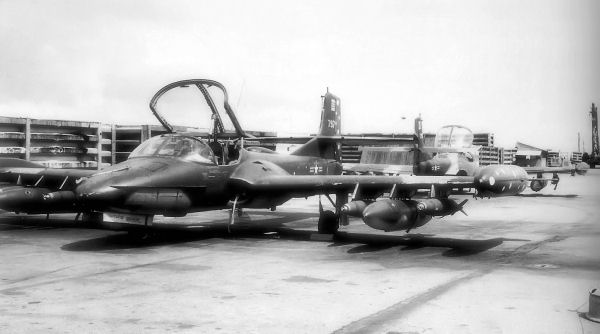
VNAF A-37s at Phù Cát c.1972

The 412st Transport Squadron formed at the base in 1970 operating C-7As inherited from the 537th Troop Carrier Squadron.

The 243rd Helicopter Squadron operating UH-1 Huey gunships was based here.

On 17 May 1974 the base was attacked by the PAVN 2nd Regiment, 3rd Division. The attack was repulsed by the 108th and 263rd Battalions of the South Vietnamese Regional Forces.

== Capture of Phù Cát Air Base ==
In mid-March 1975 Qui Nhon and Phù Cát AB were defended by the ARVN 40th Regiment and the Bình Định Regional Forces, however the 40th Regiment was soon redeployed to Khanh Duong to keep open the route for ARVN escaping from Buôn Ma Thuột. The 2nd Air Division provided air support for the 22nd Division and was also trying to destroy equipment abandoned during the evacuation of Pleiku.

On the morning of 30 March the Regional Forces defending the base abandoned their positions and by afternoon the base was under attack by VC who were held back by the base security forces. With more VC gathering for renewed attacks, the base commander contacted the 92nd Air Wing at Phan Rang AB for help. The Wing commander, Colonel Le Van Thao organised a flight of 40 A-37 Dragonflies and they carried out a night attack on the base perimeter successfully breaking up the attack. On the morning of 31 March, the 2nd Air Division evacuated the base taking 32 aircraft, but abandoning a further 50; the PAVN/VC occupied the base that afternoon.

== See also ==
- Phu Cat Air Base Security Forces
