= Vung Tau Air Base =

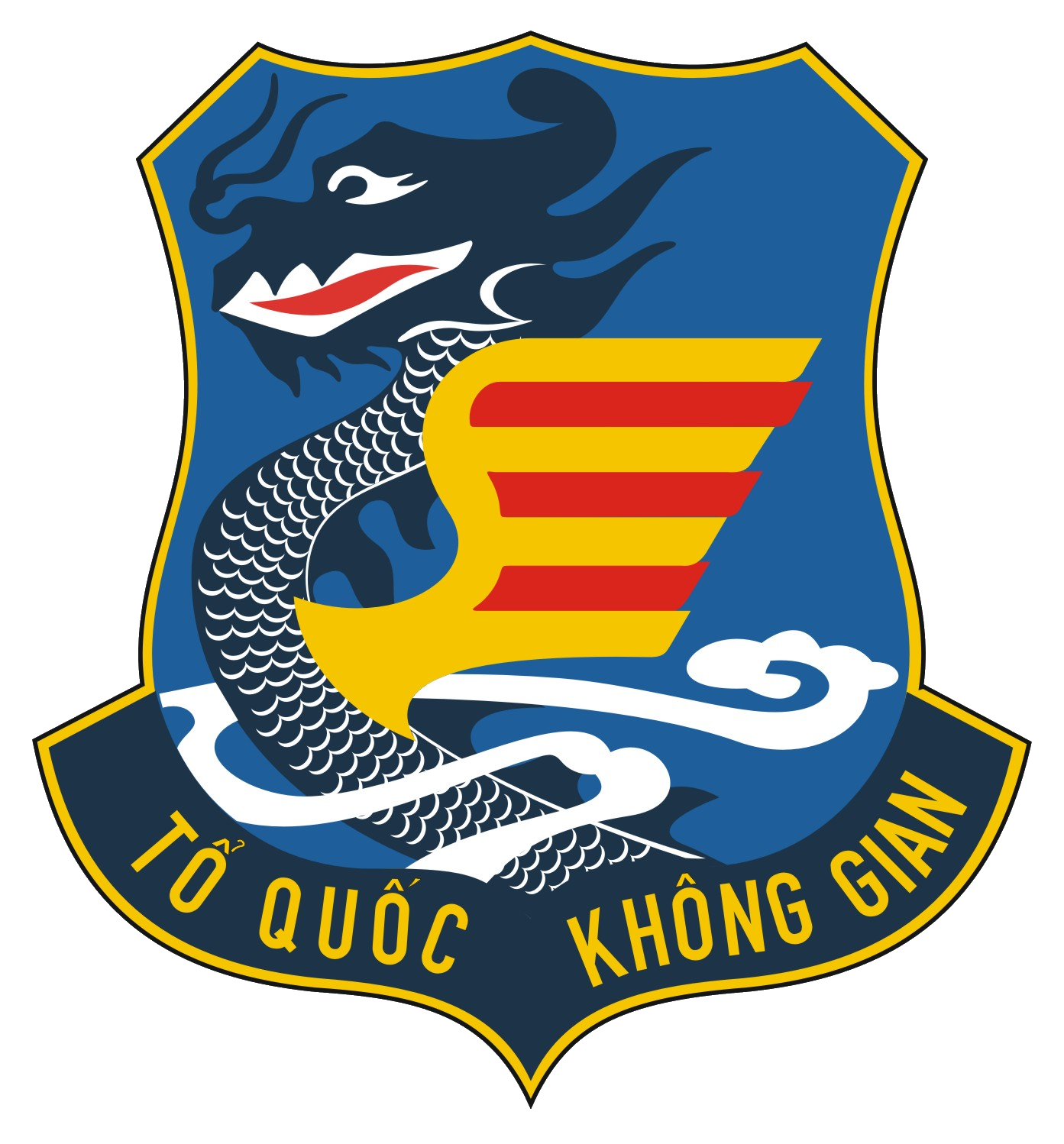
Vung Tau Air Base
- Part of Republic of Vietnam Air Force (RVNAF); Pacific Air Forces (USAF)
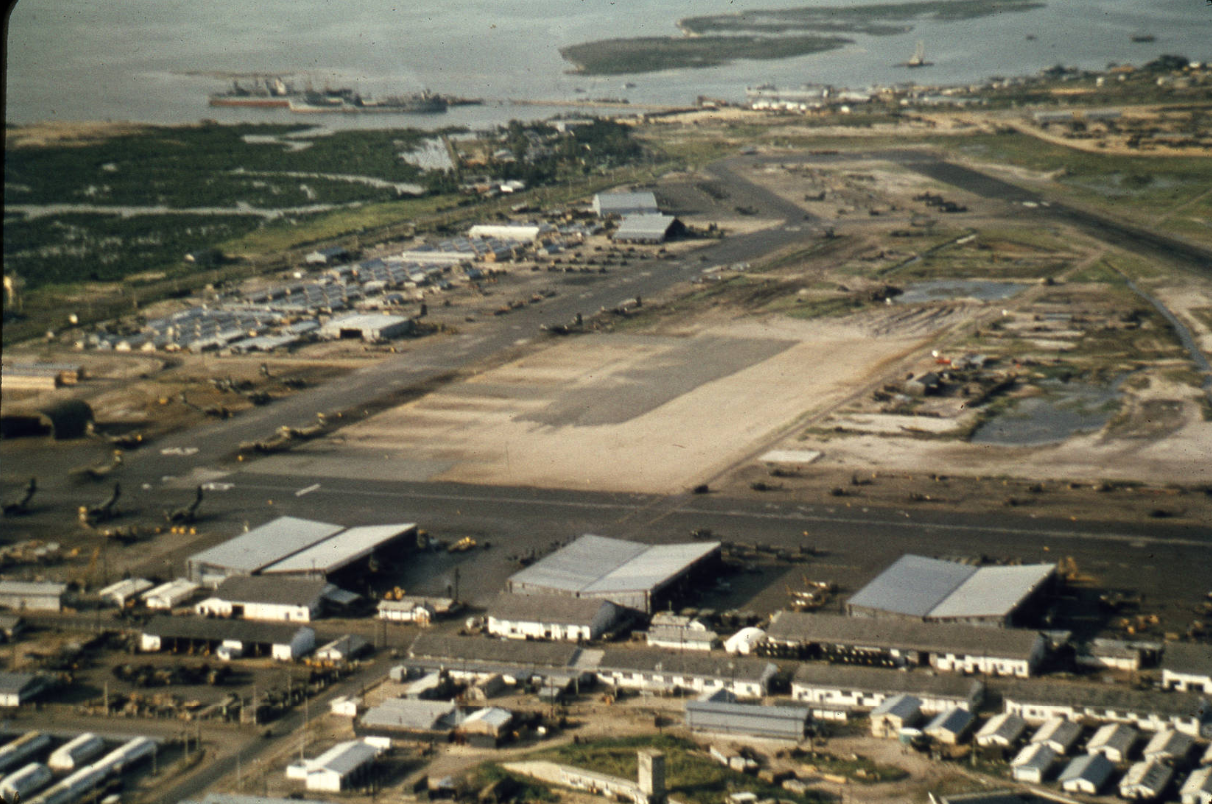
- Vung Tau Air Base in September 1967

Site information
- Type: Air Force Base
- Condition: Joint Civil/Military Airport

Location
- Coordinates: 10°22′13″N 107°05′36″E

Site history
- Built: 1955
- In use: 1955–1975
- Battles/wars: Vietnam War

Vung Tau Air Base
- IATA: VTG; ICAO: none

Summary
- Elevation AMSL: 4 m / 13 ft
- Interactive map of Vung Tau Air Base

Runways
Direction	Length		Surface
Direction	m	ft	Surface
18/36		5,900	pierced steel planking

Vung Tau Air Base (also known as Cap St Jacques Airfield and Vung Tau Army Airfield) (1955–1975) was a Republic of Vietnam Air Force (RVNAF) facility. It was located near the city of Vũng Tàu in southern Vietnam. The United States used it as a base during the Vietnam War (1959–1975), stationing Army, Air Force and Navy units there. It was also the main base supporting Australian operations in the war and Australian Army and Royal Australian Air Force units were based there. Following the Fall of Saigon it reverted to a civil airport which remains in use today.

== History ==
=== French Indochina ===
The French had originally constructed a small airfield at Cap St Jacques. The airfield was later expanded to a 5,900 feet (1,800 m) pierced steel planking (PSP) runway.

Following the partition of Vietnam in 1954, the French Air Force conducted Grumman F8F Bearcat transition training for the RVNAF at the airfield. Following the completion of this training all removable equipment was stripped from the base.

=== Vietnam War ===
In June 1961 Military Assistance Advisory Group, Vietnam awarded a contract to Bourne Associates for airfield pavement evaluation at the base.

==== United States use ====
In December 1962 the United States Army's 1st Aviation Company (Fixed-wing Light Transport) equipped with CV-2 Caribous moved to Vung Tau from Thailand. In July 1963 a second Caribou company, the 61st Aviation Company, joined it at the base. The 1st Aviation Company left the base in December 1963.

By late 1964 the Army's 765th Transportation Battalion was based at Vung Tau, it supported all four Army aviation battalions then deployed in South Vietnam with two direct support maintenance companies, one general support maintenance company, one CV-2 Caribou company and one Special Warfare aviation detachment of the 73rd Aviation Company, 222nd Aviation Battalion operating Grumman OV-1 Mohawks. In December 1964 a detachment from the United States Air Force (USAF) 8th Aerial Port Squadron began operating at the base.

In early March 1965 a team from RMK-BRJ went to the base to repair the runway. A large program began for an Army support facility, including a control tower, troop cantonment, mess-hall, petroleum, oil and lubricants storage, a network of area roads, a 750 kilowatt electrical power system, new aircraft aprons and warehouses, an array of Quonset huts for aircraft maintenance and a communications building. They also built a Troposcatter radio station atop the highest hill at Vung Tau (10.36°N 107.068°E), called VC Hill by Americans, which included 60 feet (18 m) antennae. In May 1965 as part of the initial deployments of U.S. ground forces, the 1st Battalion, 503rd Infantry Regiment (Airborne); an engineer detachment; and a medical detachment all from the 173rd Airborne Brigade arrived at the base from Okinawa to provide defense for the airfield. In mid-June the units moved to Bien Hoa Air Base to join the rest of the Brigade. From late 1965, Vũng Tàu was used as an in-county rest and recreation (R&R) center for U.S. forces operated by the 1st Logistical Command and the base was used to transport U.S. personnel from their units to the R&R center. The base was used to shuttle newly arrived troops of the 1st and 25th Infantry Divisions to Bien Hoa Air Base in October 1965 and early 1966. A detachment of five USAF C-130 Hercules operated from the base from December 1965 to March 1966.

The Army's 53rd Aviation Detachment, Field Evaluation (Provisional) operating three ACH-47A Chinook gunships operated from the base in mid-1966. On 8 August 1966 ACH-47A Stump Jumper #64-13151 collided while taxiing with another CH-47 at the base and was completely destroyed. The remaining two ACH-47As subsequently moved to Camp Radcliff. On 13 July 1966 Caribou #61-2386 was destroyed at the base by Vietcong (VC) mortar fire. From July to December 1966, in accordance with the Johnson-McConnell agreement, the USAF took over the ex-Army Caribou transport aircraft in South Vietnam. The 535th and 536th Tactical Airlift Squadrons operated the redesignated C-7A Caribous from the base from 1 January 1967 to 1 July 1970, when they moved to Cam Ranh Base.

The United States Navy's HA(L)-3 equipped with Bell UH-1 Iroquois helicopter gunships was formed at the base on 1 April 1967. On 26 January 1972 the squadron commenced standdown and on 16 March 1972 it was disestablished. The joint U.S. Army and Royal Australian Navy Experimental Military Unit operating UH-1 helicopters was formed at the base, becoming operational on 3 November 1967. The unit operated from the base during November and December, then was relocated to Blackhorse Base Camp in Xuân Lộc district on 31 December.

On 23 April 1968 VC mortar fire destroyed C-7 #61-2399 at the base.

On 17 January 1969 C-7 #60-5434 veered off the runway and was damaged beyond repair. Detachment B of the U.S. Navy's VAL-4 equipped with OV-10A Broncos operated from the base from mid-1969 until its disestablishment in April 1972.

During the Fall of Saigon on 27 April 1975 two 374th Airlift Wing planes landed at the base and evacuated approximately 250 dependents of the Republic of Vietnam Marine Division troops who were defending the base in return for assurances that the base would be held.

==== Australian use ====
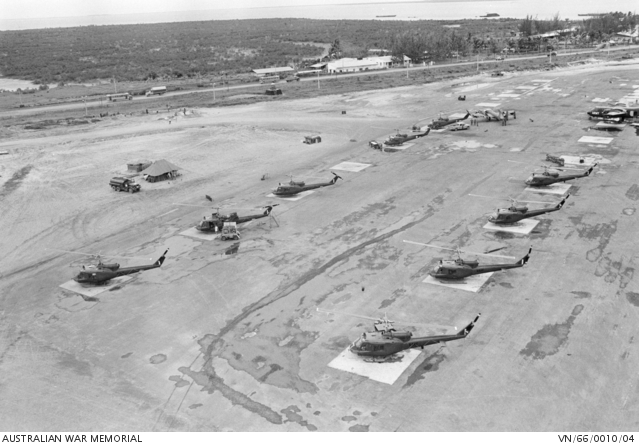
No. 9 Squadron RAAF UH-1s at Vung Tau, June 1966

Royal Australian Air Force (RAAF) Transport Flight Vietnam (RTFV) was formed at the base with three DHC-4 Caribou transports, in July 1964. On 1 June 1966, RTFV was redesignated No. 35 Squadron. The squadron, nicknamed "Wallaby Airlines" operated from the base until 13 February 1972 when it was withdrawn to Australia.

On 13 May 1966 the Australian Army's 161 Reconnaissance Flight was relocated to the base from Bien Hoa Air Base to support the operations of the 1st Australian Task Force (1ATF) in its tactical area of responsibility of Phuoc Tuy Province. The flight operated from the base and surrounding airfields and landing zones until its withdrawal to Australia in late 1971. In mid-June 1966 No. 9 Squadron equipped with UH-1 helicopters arrived at the base to provide transport and gunship support for 1ATF. The squadron was eventually withdrawn on 8 December 1971.

RAAF C-130s also operated regular flights to the base, bringing in equipment and evacuating casualties.

==== Other Free World forces ====
The Royal New Zealand Air Force operated a regular shuttle service between Tan Son Nhut Air Base, Vung Tau and Qui Nhơn Airfield using Bristol Freighters. The Republic of Korea Air Force operated a twice-weekly shuttle service between Tan Son Nhut, Vung Tau, Nha Trang Air Base and Qui Nhơn using Curtiss C-46 Commandos.
