= 87th Air Base Wing =

87th Air Base Wing

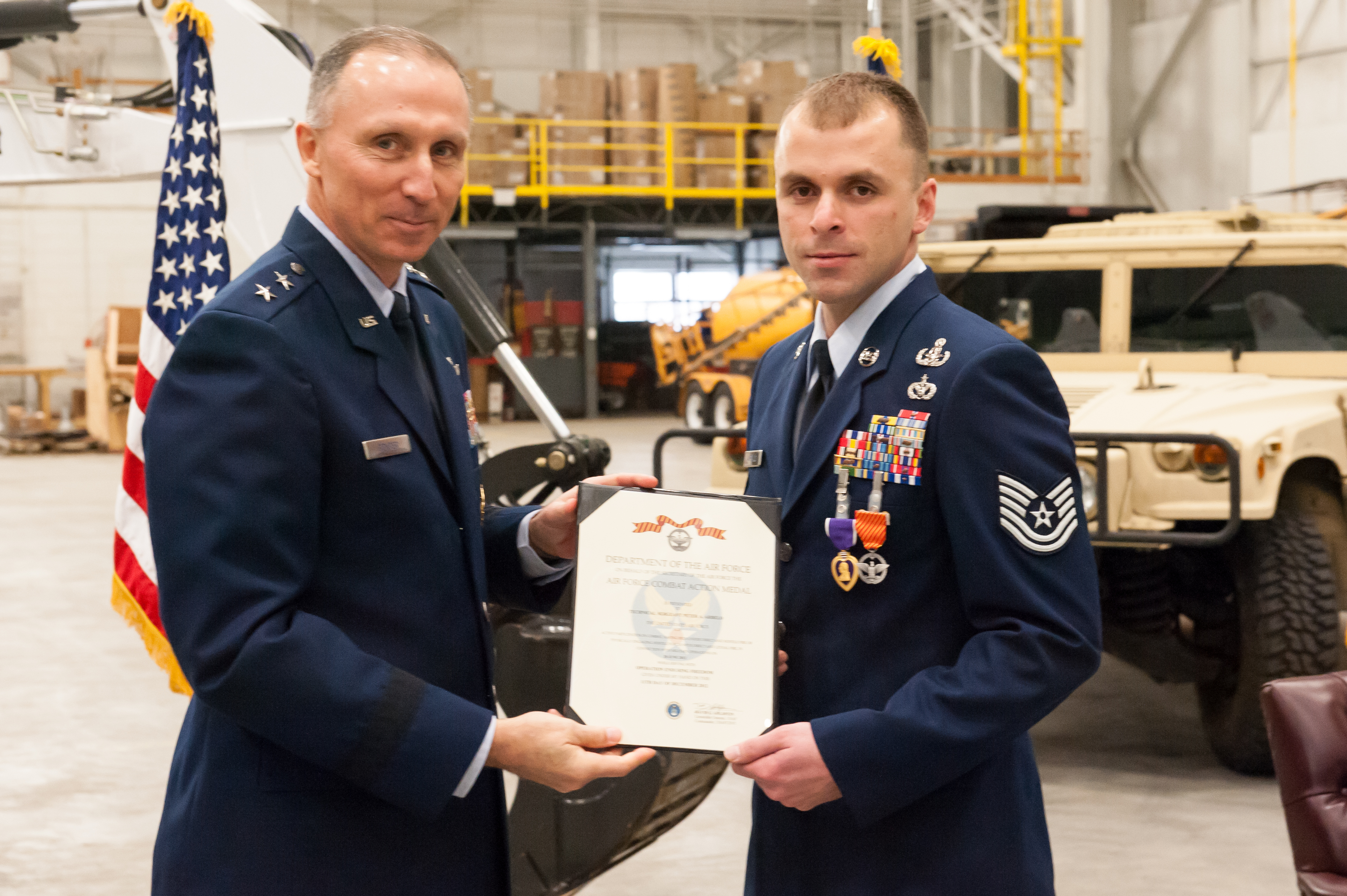
- 87th EOD technician is awarded Purple Heart and Combat Action Medal for action in Afghanistan
- Active: 1952–1953; 2009–present
- Country: United States
- Branch: United States Air Force
- Type: Air base wing
- Role: Installation support
- Size: 3,100 personnel
- Part of: Air Mobility Command
- Garrison/HQ: Joint Base McGuire–Dix–Lakehurst
- Motto: Ut Unum Vincere (Latin for 'Win as One')
- Decorations: Air Force Outstanding Unit Award

Commanders
- Current commander: Colonel Michael D. Stefanovic
- Army Deputy Installation Commander: Colonel Bryan R. Dunker
- Navy Deputy Installation Commander: Captain James B. Howell
- Command Chief: CMSgt Nicholas Conner

Insignia
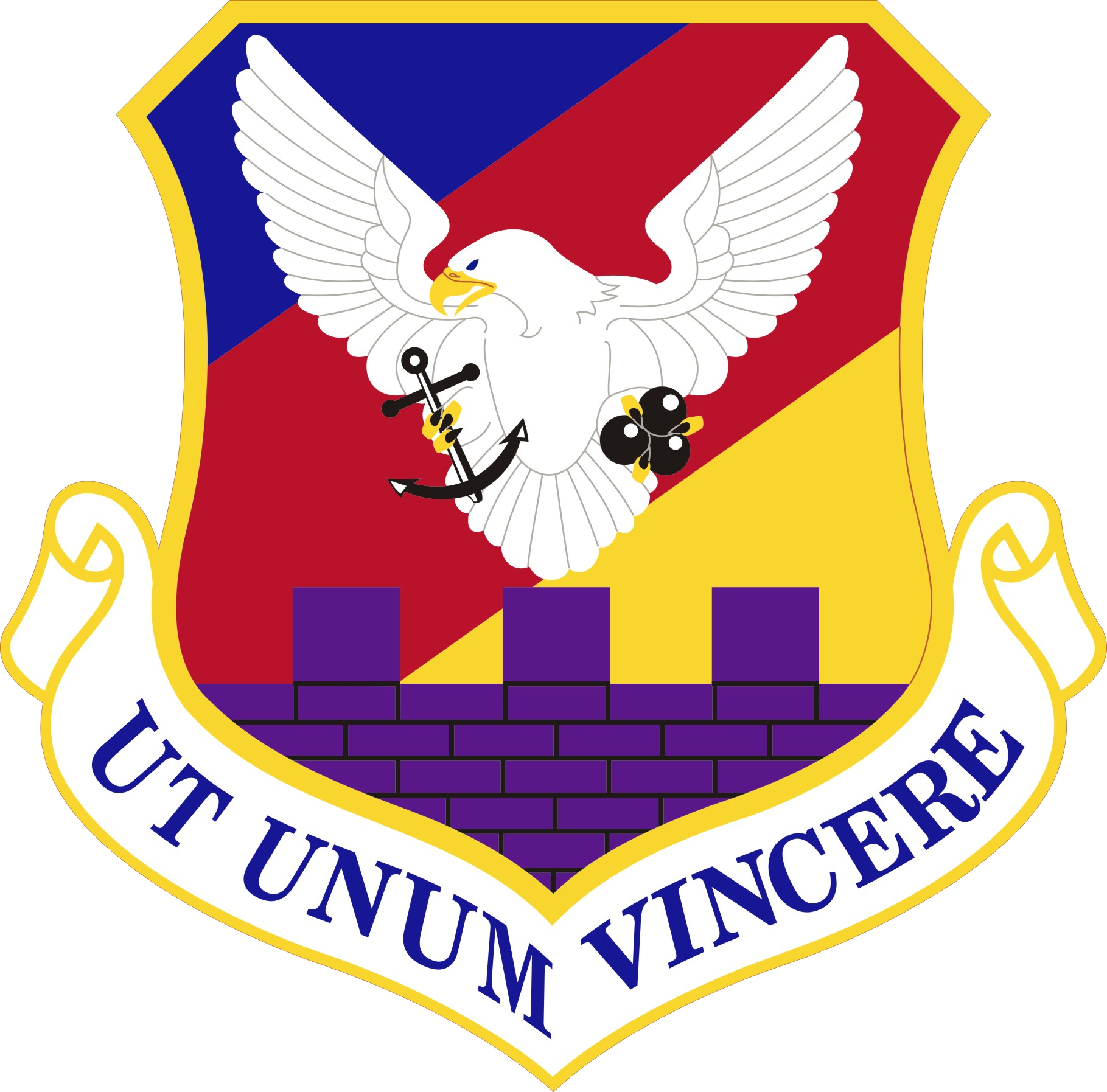
- 87th Air Base Wing emblem (Note: Approved 3 August 2010.)

The 87th Air Base Wing is the host wing at Joint Base McGuire–Dix–Lakehurst (JB MDL), New Jersey and its headquarters are on the McGuire Air Force Base portion of the Joint Base. The 42,000-acre (170 km^{2}) large joint base is located 18 miles southeast of Trenton, New Jersey, and is home to 80 unique DOD activities. The wing provides installation support to commands at McGuire Air Force Base, Fort Dix, and Naval Air Engineering Station Lakehurst. Joint Base McGuire–Dix–Lakehurst is the Department of Defense's (DoD) only tri-service joint base that consolidated Air Force, Army, and Navy installations.

Before assuming host duties at JB MDL in 2009, the wing had been active as an Air Force Reserve troop carrier wing during the Korean War. It was inactivated less than a year after it was formed, when the 434th Troop Carrier Wing was released from active duty and assumed the 87th Wing's personnel and equipment.

== Units ==
=== 87th Mission Support Group ===
In garrison, the 87th Mission Support Group prepares the wing to deploy, bed down and sustain forward operations. At McGuire-Dix-Lakehurst and in deployed locations the group provides facilities, services, logistics management, contracting, force protection, fire protection, crisis action planning and response, communications, passenger and cargo movement, and personnel management.

Components

- 87th Communications Squadron
- 87th Contracting Squadron
- 87th Logistics Readiness Squadron
- 87th Security Forces Squadron
- 87th Force Support Squadron 3 March 2009 – present

=== 87th Medical Group ===
The 400-member 87th Medical Group operates a multi-specialty outpatient clinic. Its mission is to train mission-ready medics, deliver a medically ready operational force and ensure a healthy base community. The group prepares service members to serve at their home station and on deployment, while meeting healthcare needs of nearly 17,000 Tricare Prime enrollees and over 42,000 DoD beneficiaries.

Components

- 87th Healthcare Operations Squadron
- 87th Operational Medical Readiness Squadron
- 87th Medical Support Squadron

== History ==
=== Air Force reserves ===
All Air Force Reserve combat flying organizations were mobilized for the Korean War. The mobilization left the reserve without aircraft, and the reserve units did not receive aircraft until July 1952. In preparation for the return of reserve flying operations, the Air Force activated the 87th Troop Carrier Wing at Atterbury Air Force Base, where it absorbed the personnel of the 923d Reserve Training Wing. The wing began to train for troop carrier operations, primarily with Curtiss C-46 Commandos, under the supervision of the 2466th Air Force Reserve Training Center. The wing also flew a number of other aircraft possessed by the center.

In early 1953, the 434th Troop Carrier Wing, which had been the reserve flying wing at Atterbury until called to active duty in May 1951, was released from active duty and returned to the reserve. The 87th Wing was inactivated and transferred its mission, equipment and personnel to the 434th Wing.

=== Multiservice base support ===
The 2005 Base Realignment and Closure Commission recommended the combination of facilities of different armed services that were close to one another. As a result, Joint Base McGuire–Dix–Lakehurst was established in central New Jersey from the former McGuire Air Force Base, Fort Dix and Naval Air Engineering Station Lakehurst. The Air Force was designated the lead service for support activities at the new base and organized the 87th Air Base Wing to carry out the mission. The wing's cadre was taken from the mission support and medical groups of the 305th Air Mobility Wing, which retained its operations group and became a tenant organization.

In addition to its two groups and one squadron, the wing has 14 staff agencies. (Note: Wing staff agencies include Air Forces Smart Operations for the 21st Century (AFSO 21), Business Office, Chaplains, Community Support Coordinator, Command Post, Equal Opportunity, History Office, Inspector General, Legal Office, Plans and Programs, Public Affairs, Safety, and Sexual Assault Response and Prevention.) Although the wing commander is an Air Force officer, its command structure includes an Army Joint Base Deputy Commander and a Navy Joint Base Deputy Commander.

The wing has supported several significant operations and activities, including recovery operations for Hurricanes Irene and Sandy. It has earned four Air Force Outstanding Unit Awards.

== Lineage ==
- Established as the 87th Troop Carrier Wing, Medium on 26 May 1952

Activated in the reserve on 15 June 1952
Inactivated on 15 February 1953

- Redesignated 87th Tactical Airlift Wing on 31 July 1985 (remained inactive)
- Redesignated 87th Air Base Wing on 19 February 2009

Activated on 3 March 2009

=== Assignments ===
- 2d Air Reserve District, 15 June 1952 – 1 February 1953
- Eighteenth Air Force, 3 March 2009
- United States Air Force Expeditionary Center, 7 January 2011 – present

=== Components ===
Groups

- 87th Air Base Group (later 87th Mission Support Group): 15 June 1952 – 15 February 1953, 3 March 2009 – present
- 87th Maintenance & Supply Group: 15 June 1952 – 15 February 1953
- 87th Medical Group: 15 June 1952 – 15 February 1953, 3 March 2009 – present
- 87th Troop Carrier Group: 15 June 1952 – 15 February 1953

Squadron

- 87th Comptroller Squadron: 3 March 2009 – present

=== Stations ===
- Atterbury Air Force Base, Indiana, 15 June 1952 – 1 February 1953
- McGuire Air Force Base (Part of Joint Base McGuire–Dix–Lakehurst), New Jersey, 3 March 2009 – present

=== Aircraft ===
- Beechcraft T-7 Navigator, 1952-1953
- Curtiss C-46 Commando, 1952-1953
- Douglas C-47 Skytrain, 1953
- North American B-25 Mitchell, 1952-1953
- North American T-6 Texan, 1953
