= TASS (disambiguation) =

TASS is a major news agency in Russia, successor to the Telegraph Agency of the Soviet Union (Telegrafnoye agentstvo Sovetskogo Soyuza).

TASS or Tass may also refer to:

== Places ==
- Tass River, South Island, New Zealand; a river
- Tass, Hungary, a village in Bács-Kiskun county
- Nyírtass, Szabolcs-Szatmár-Bereg county, Hungary; a village; formerly Tass

== People ==
- Anastasios Tass Repousis, Australian dancer
- Atilio Tass (born 1957), Argentinian fencer
- Matthias Tass (born 1999), Estonian basketball player
- Nadia Tass (born c. 1959), Australian filmmaker
- Olga Tass (1929–2020) Hungarian gymnast
- Richard Tass, U.S. politician

== Technology ==
- Tactical Automated Security System, a U.S. Air Force intrusion detection and surveillance system
- Tass Times in Tonetown, a video game
- Tilt Authorisation and Speed Supervision, a system to provide tilting information for trains
- Trading Advisor Selection System, database for hedge funds

== Other ==
- USAF Tactical Air Support Squadron (disambiguation)
  - List of current USAF Tactical Air Support Squadrons
- Talented Athlete Scholarship Scheme, youth sport scheme in England
- Technical, Administrative and Supervisory Section, a former British trade union
- Toxic anterior segment syndrome, an inflammation in the eye's interior
- Telluride Association Sophomore Seminar, a six-week seminar free educational program for schoolchildren in the United States
