= 1987 Okinawan Tu-16 airspace violation =

The 1987 Okinawan Tu-16 airspace violation (対ソ連軍領空侵犯機警告射撃事件, Tai Soren-gun ryōkū shinpan-ki keikoku shageki jiken) was an incident on December 9, 1987 in which a Tupolev Tu-16P Badger J1 (an electronic warfare version of the Tu-16 bomber) of the Soviet Air Force repeatedly entered Japanese airspace over Okinawa and Kagoshima prefectures. This prompted a F-4EJ Phantom fighter of the Japan Air Self-Defense Force (JASDF) to fire warning shots on two occasions. It was the first time aircraft of the JASDF had done so in response to an aircraft intruding in Japanese airspace. The Soviet Union apologized, claiming that the intrusion was accidental and due to meteorological conditions.

== Background ==
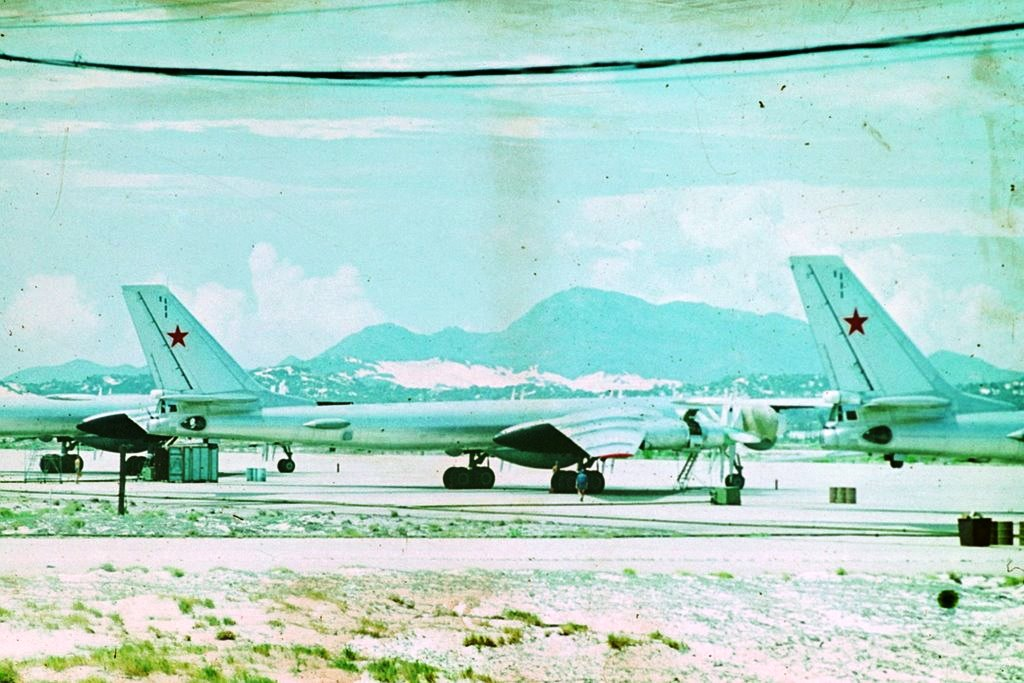
Cam Ranh Base during the Soviet era (Tu-142Ms pictured)

Throughout the Cold War the USSR flew Tokyo Express flights nearby Japan. From 1967 to 1987, Soviet aircraft had violated Japanese airspace 20 times. On September 6, 1976 Soviet pilot Viktor Belenko had flown his MiG-25 to Hokkaido in order to defect to the United States. Japanese radar had been unable to adequately track him, and the F-4EJ fighters of the 302nd Tactical Fighter Squadron launched from Chitose Air Base had been unable to intercept him and the Japanese air defense system.

In the mid-1980s, the Soviet Union had air and naval forces based at Cam Ranh Base in Vietnam. These forces included MiG-23 fighters and around 16 Tupolev Tu-16 bombers. Long-ranged Tu-16 aircraft regularly passed Japanese territory traveling between Vladivostok in the Soviet Union to Vietnam. JASDF fighters had previously intercepted them as they neared or entered Japanese airspace.

On August 27, 1987 a Soviet aircraft had entered Japanese airspace near Rebun island in Hokkaido.

== December 9th Intercept timeline ==
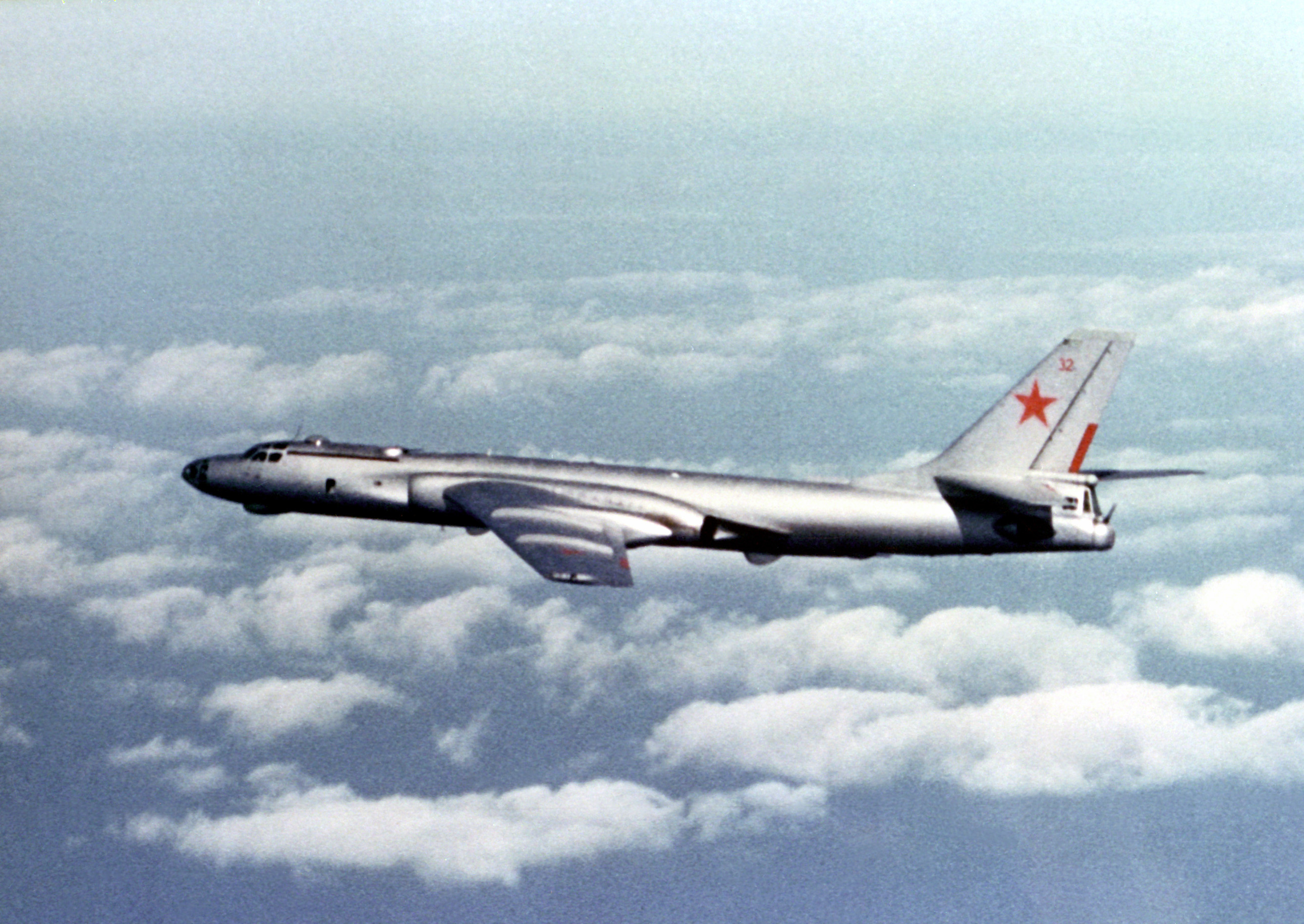
A Soviet Tupolev Tu-16 similar to the model that entered Japanese airspace

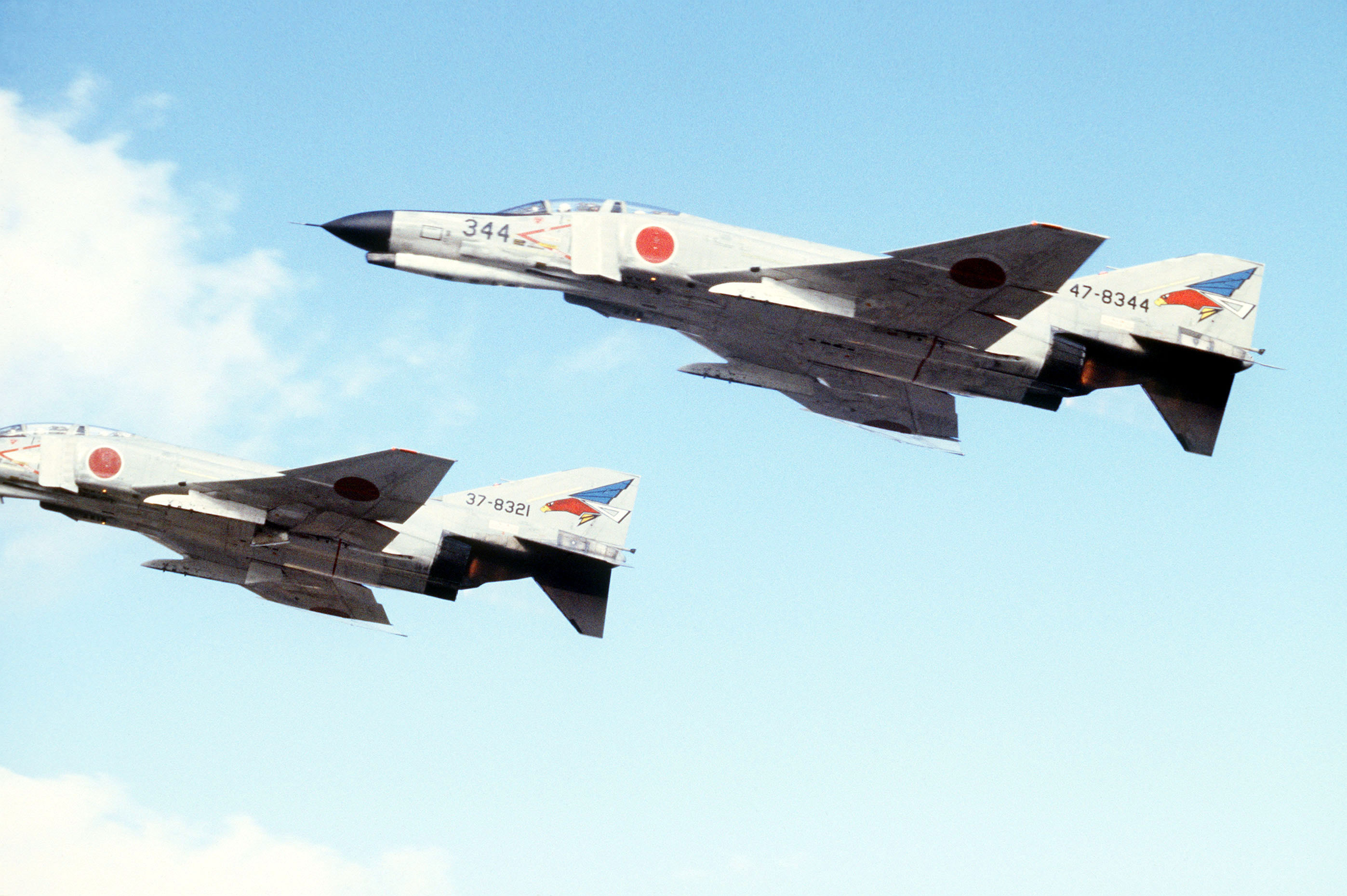
Japan Air Self Defense Force F-4EJs of 302 Squadron

- ~10:30 am - Miyakojima radar detects four unknown aircraft. They are later identified as Soviet Tupolev Tu-16s.
- ~10:45 am - Two F-4EJ aircraft of the 302nd Tactical Fighter Squadron scramble from Naha Air Base to intercept the aircraft. This is the same squadron whose aircraft had failed to intercept Victor Belenko's defecting Soviet MiG-25 in Hokkaido in 1976. The squadron had moved bases from Hokkaido to Okinawa in 1985. After the initial two F-4s took off four more aircraft launched. Warnings are given in English and Russian over the radio.
- 11:10 am - Three of the Tu-16s pass Miyakojima and head northward.
- 11:20 am - The remaining Tu-16 heads north and approaches the main island of Okinawa. Two F-4s continue tracking it. An F-4 pilot requests permission to fire warning shots. The permission is given.
- 11:24:30 am - the Tu-16 violates Japanese airspace. It passes over US military facilities. An F-4 fires warning shots and visually signals to the Tu-16 to land.
- 11:31:30 am - The Tu-16 leaves Japanese airspace.
- 11:41:30 am - The Tu-16 re-enters Japanese airspace above Okinoerabujima in Okinawa prefecture and Tokunoshima in Kagoshima prefecture. An F-4 fires a second burst of warning shots.
- 11:45:45 am - The Tu-16 leaves Japanese airspace. It lands at Pyongyang in North Korea.

== Aftermath ==
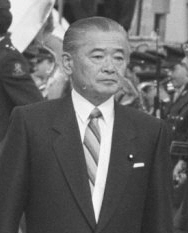
Japanese Prime Minister Noboru Takeshita protested the violation of Japan's airspace

On the evening of December 9, the Japanese ministry of foreign affairs announced that they would protest the airspace violation to the Soviet government. The Japanese Prime Minister Noboru Takeshita stated that it was regrettable that a nuclear capable bomber had violated Japan's airspace the day after the Intermediate-Range Nuclear Forces Treaty was signed between the USSR and the USA.

On December 10, Kazuyoshi Hasegawa of the ministry of foreign affairs summoned Nikolai Soloviev, Soviet ambassador to Japan, and expressed Japan's displeasure. Hasegawa requested facts and demanded the punishment of those responsible. The Soviet side blamed poor weather and instrument failure. However, the weather at that time was sunny.

On December 11, a Soviet press conference announced that the responsible person would be punished, but no formal answer was made.

On December 17, the Japanese foreign minister Sōsuke Uno spoke to the Soviet Vice-Foreign minister Anatolii Leonidovich Adamishin.

On December 25 the Soviet ambassador Soloviev explained the situation.

At his retirement speech on January 14, 1988 Lieutenant General Edward L Tixier, the commander of the US Fifth Air Force mentioned that US aircraft had also been airborne, monitoring the situation.

On February 15, 1988 the Soviet embassy revealed punishments for the crew of the Tu-16.

== See also ==
- Violations of Japanese airspace
- Tokyo Express
