= USAF Tactical Air Support Squadron =

USAF Tactical Air Support Squadron may refer to:

- 19th Tactical Air Support Squadron
- 20th Tactical Air Support Squadron
- 21st Tactical Air Support Squadron
- 22nd Tactical Air Support Squadron
- 23d Tactical Air Support Squadron
- 24th Tactical Air Support Squadron
- 25th Tactical Air Support Squadron
- 27th Tactical Air Support Squadron
- 169th Tactical Air Support Squadron
- 172d Tactical Air Support Squadron
- 178th Tactical Air Support Squadron
- 556th Tactical Air Support Squadron
- 557th Tactical Air Support Squadron
- 558th Tactical Air Support Squadron
- 601st Tactical Air Support Squadron
- 701st Tactical Air Support Squadron
- 702nd Tactical Air Support Squadron
- 757th Tactical Air Support Squadron

== See also ==
- List of United States Air Force support squadrons
