= 1st Proving Ground Group =

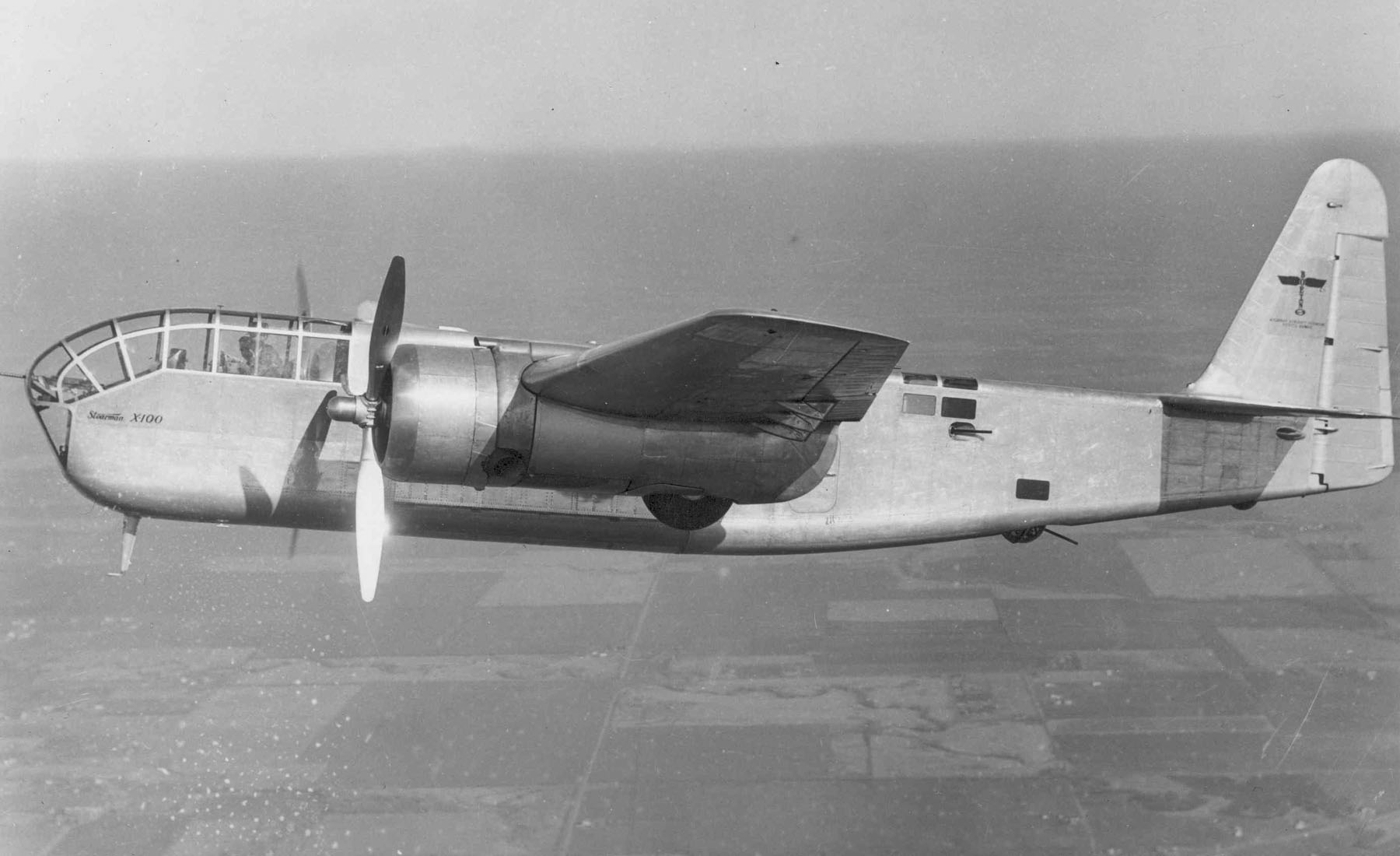
- Stearman XA-21, one of the planes tested by the group
- Active: 1939-1944
- Country: United States
- Branch: United States Army Air Forces
- Role: Test and Development

Insignia
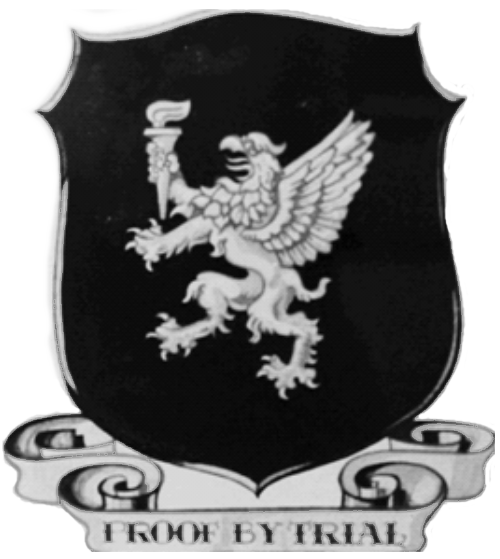
- 1st Proving Ground Group emblem

The 1st Proving Ground Group is a disbanded United States Army Air Forces unit. It was last active with the Army Air Forces Proving Ground Command, based at Eglin Field, Florida, where it was disbanded on 1 April 1944. The unit's personnel/equipment/mission was taken over by the 610th Army Air Forces Base Unit (AAF Base Unit) and 611th AAF Base Unit.

The group was originally established as the 23d Composite Group and was part of the Air Corps Tactical School with a mission that focused on developing and demonstrating tactics and doctrine. After moving to Eglin it also conducted testing of experimental weapons.

== History ==
The group was established at Maxwell Field, Alabama in August 1939 as the 23d Composite Group. It was assigned the 1st Pursuit Squadron, 24th Bombardment Squadron (Light) (not manned until 1940) and the 54th Bombardment Squadron (Medium).

Throughout the 1930s, there had been a number of attempts to have Air Corps tactical units demonstrate current tactics to students attending the Air Corps Tactical School, which was the advanced school for Air Corps officers. The impracticability of scheduling a recently trained unit with modern aircraft for these demonstrations led the school to recommend the formation of a composite unit permanently stationed with the school as early as 1932. The recommendation was disapproved because of the lack of personnel or equipment that could be dedicated to this mission. The establishment of the group was finally approved in August 1939, with the understanding that the group would also assume the demonstration and exhibition function that was being carried out by combat units of Air Force Combat Command.

The group was also assigned the mission of performing tactical service tests of aircraft and other equipment, developing and testing new air tactics, and demonstrating these new tactics to the service schools of the other branches of the Army, to General Headquarters, and at Air Corps stations. However, because the Tactical School suspended classes in June 1940 because experienced officers were required for the expansion of the Air Corps in response to the war in Europe and could not be spared for a nine-month-long school, the group was only able to support the school for a short time. In September 1940, the group moved to Orlando Army Air Base, Florida, which would become the base for the Army Air Forces School of Applied Tactics.

The group transferred from Orlando for assignment to Eglin Field to conduct flight testing activities in July 1941. At Eglin it was redesignated as the Air Corps Proving Ground Detachment, then the Air Corps Proving Ground Group. On 1 May 1942, the group's three original squadrons were disbanded as it focused on weapons development rather than tactics.

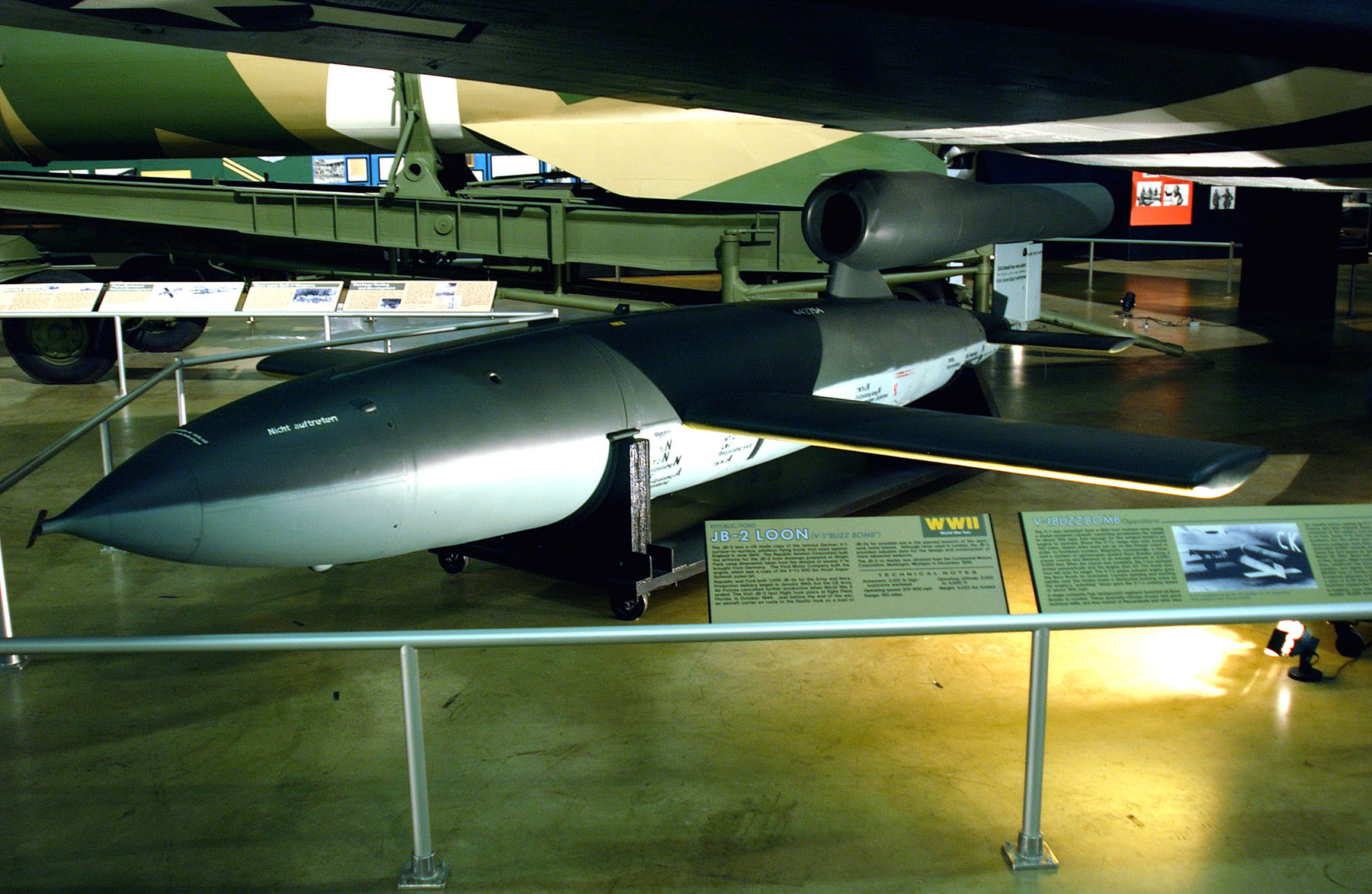
JB-2 Buzz Bomb

In 1944, the group conducted "Operation Crossbow" program to determine the best method of attacking German V-1 "buzz bomb" sites along the French and Dutch coasts, February 1944. Began testing the Republic-Ford JB-2, an American version of the German V-1, which became the foundation of the Air Force guided missile program, October 1944.

The AAF found standard military units, based on relatively inflexible tables of organization, were proving less well adapted to the support mission. Accordingly, a more functional system was adopted in which each base was organized into a separate numbered unit. Accordingly, the group was disbanded, and the testing mission and associated personnel of the group were assumed by the 611th AAF Base Unit (Flight Test) (later 611th AF Base Unit (Proof Test Group)). At the same time the 610th Army Air Forces Base Unit (Proving Ground Complement) assumed the equipment, and personnel of the group associated with base support as well as those of the 118th WAC Post Headquarters Company, 2051st Ordnance Company, Aviation (Service), 869th Signal Service Company (Aviation), 24th Aviation Squadron, 4th AAF Emergency Rescue Boat Squadron, and 1453d Quartermaster Service Company (Aviation). Later in 1944, the 610th assumed the electronics and flight test activities of the 611th and became the 610th AAF Base Unit (Flight Test).

The 610th transferred its base support activities to the 609th AAF Base Unit (Airdrome Group) in January 1947 and was discontinued on 1 August 1947 with its mission assumed by Army Air Forces Proving Ground (Provisional). The 611th AAF Base Unit was discontinued on 9 July 1948, when the Air Proving Ground Command reorganized according to the Wing/Base (Hobson Plan) model.

== Lineage ==
- Constituted as: 23d Composite Group, and activated on 1 August 1939

Redesignated as: Air Corps Proving Ground Detachment on 1 July 1941
Redesignated as: Air Corps Proving Ground Group on 10 April 1942
Redesignated as: 1st Proving Ground Group on 16 April 1943
Disbanded on 1 April 1944.

=== Assignments ===
- Air Corps Tactical School, 1 August 1939
- Office of the Chief of Air Corps, 1 June 1940
- Air Corps Proving Ground (later Proving Ground Command), 15 May 1941 – 1 April 1944

=== Stations ===
- Maxwell Field, Alabama
- Army Air Base, Orlando, Florida, 1 September 1940
- Eglin Field, Florida, 29 May 1941- 1 April 1944

=== Components ===
- 1st Pursuit Squadron (later 1st Pursuit Squadron (Interceptor)): 1 August 1939 - 1 May 1942
- 1st Proving Ground Torpedo Squadron: 27 August 1942 – 1 April 1944
- 24th Bombardment Squadron (Light): 1 December 1939 - 1 May 1942
- 54th Bombardment Squadron (Medium): 1 October 1939 - 1 May 1942
- 1000 Quartermaster Boat Company (Aviation)(later 4th AAF Emergency Rescue Boat Squadron): 9 September 1942 – 1 April 1944
- 2051st Ordnance Company, Aviation (Service): By 1 June 1943 – 1 April 1944
- 3062d Ordnance Company, Aviation (Service)

=== Aircraft ===
- Curtiss A-12 Shrike, 1940–1942
- Curtiss A-18 Shrike, 1940–1942
- Douglas A-20 Havoc, 1940–1942
- Stearman XA-21, 1940–1942
- Martin B-10, 1940–1942
- Martin B-12, 1939–1940
- Boeing B-17 Flying Fortress, 1939–1942
- Douglas B-18 Bolo, 1940–1942
- Douglas B-23 Dragon, 1940–1942
- North American B-25 Mitchell, 1940–1942
- Martin B-26 Marauder, 1941–1942
- North American BC-1A, 1941–1942
- Lockheed C-36 Electra, 1940–1942
- Lockheed C-40 Electra, 1939–1940
- Douglas O-38, 1939–1940
- Grumman OA-9 Goose, 1939–1942
- Bell YFM-1 Airacuda, 1939–1940
- Consolidated P-30, 1939–1940
- Curtiss P-36 Hawk, 1939–1942
- Curtiss YP-37, 1939–1940
- Bell P-39 Airacobra, 1941–1942
- Curtiss P-40 Warhawk, 1941–1942
- Waco PT-14, 1939–1942
- Stearman PT-17, 1939–1940
- Douglas SBD Dauntless, 1939–1940 (Navy)

== Bibliography ==
- Craven, Wesley F; Cate, James L, eds. (1955). The Army Air Forces in World War II. Vol. VI, Men & Planes. Chicago, Illinois: University of Chicago Press. LCCN 48003657.
- Finney, Robert T. (March 1955). "History of the Air Corps Tactical School, 1920-1940, USAF Historical Study No. 100" (PDF). Research Studies Institute, USAF Historical Division, Air University. Archived from the original (PDF) on 13 March 2013.
- Maurer, Maurer, ed. (1982) [1969]. Combat Squadrons of the Air Force, World War II (PDF) (reprint ed.). Washington, DC: Office of Air Force History. ISBN 0-405-12194-6. Archived from the original (PDF) on 20 December 2016.
- Mueller, Robert (1989). Air Force Bases, Vol. I, Active Air Force Bases Within the United States of America on 17 September 1982 (PDF). Washington, DC: Office of Air Force History. ISBN 0-912799-53-6.
- Ravenstein, Charles A. (1984). Air Force Combat Wings, Lineage & Honors Histories 1947-1977. Washington, DC: Office of Air Force History. ISBN 0-912799-12-9.
