= Lipper =

American financial services firm

- Company type: subsidiary
- Industry: Financial services
- Founded: 1973
- Founder: A. Michael Lipper, CFA
- Headquarters: New York City, United States
- Products: Lipper for Investment Management; Lipper Hindsight; Lipper Data Feeds; Lipper Fund Factsheets; Lipper for Retirement; Lipper Leaders Fund Ratings; Lipper Classifications; Lipper Indices; Lipper Research Services
- Number of employees: over 500 globally
- Parent: London Stock Exchange Group, formerly part of Thomson Reuters
- Website: lipperalpha.refinitiv.com

Thomson Reuters Lipper is an American financial services firm and part of Thomson Reuters. Founded in 1973 as Lipper Analytical Services, it was acquired by Reuters in 1998.

== Corporate history ==
Lipper Analytical Services was founded in 1973 by securities analyst A. Michael Lipper. The company's initial focus was to provide data and analysis to mutual funds companies in the United States. In subsequent years, Lipper Analytical Services expanded via growth and acquisitions. In 1998, Lipper Analytical was acquired by Reuters Group PLC as a wholly owned subsidiary. In April 2008, Lipper became part of Thomson Reuters when Thomson Financial and Reuters merged. The Lipper Fiduciary Services and competitive business unit known as Lipper FMI was purchased by Broadridge Financial Solutions in May 2015.

Acquired companies that have operated under the Lipper brand include:

- Hardwick Stafford Wright Limited (HSW) - supplier of fund performance information to the UK industry
- BOPP ISB AG - Swiss provider of fund performance and analysis
- CAMRA - supplier of fund portfolio information and analysis
- BT Alex Brown Investment Trusts - data business, a division of Bankers Trust International Plc
- Fitzrovia International - a UK based provider of fund fees and expenses research
- HedgeWorld - news, research and analysis on global hedge funds
- TASS Research - hedge fund performance database.
- FERI Fund Market Information Ltd - European fund market research specialist.
- AMG Data Services - U.S. based mutual fund flows data provider
- Globe and Mail Mutual Fund Database - tracker of Canadian mutual fund performance

Lipper provides retirement plan analysis and reporting tools for financial advisors and research from its offices in the Americas, Europe, Asia and the Middle East.

== Fund ratings and indices ==
Lipper Leaders Rating System

The Lipper Leaders Rating System is a mutual fund rating system that uses investor-centered criteria, such as capital preservation, expense and consistent return. Funds are rated on a numeric scale of 5 to 1, with ‘5’ representing funds with the highest rating or Lipper Leaders, and ‘1’ representing the lowest rated funds.

The Lipper Ratings are derived from formulas that analyze funds against defined criteria. Funds are compared to similar funds within a peer group. Each fund is ranked against its peers based on the metric used (such as Total Return or Expense), and the highest 20% of funds in each peer group are named Lipper Leaders, the next 20% receive a rating of 4, the middle 20% are rated 3, the next 20% are rated 2, and the lowest 20% are rated 1. While Lipper Leader Ratings are not predictive of future performance, they are designed to provide context and perspective for making knowledgeable fund investment decisions.

The ratings are subject to change every month and are calculated for the following periods: three-year, five-year, ten-year, and overall. The overall calculation is based on an equal-weighted average of percentile ranks for each metric over three-, five-, and ten-year periods (if applicable).

The Lipper Ratings metrics: Total Return, Consistent Return, Preservation, Tax Efficiency (US Only), and Expense

Lipper Indices

Lipper Indices are a set of benchmarking tools used to track, monitor and analyze fund performance. Several of Lipper's 160 indices for the open-end, closed-end, and variable annuity universes track performance since the early 1960s.

Indices: Lipper Sector Indices, Thomson Reuters Lipper Optimal Indices, Thomson Reuters Lipper Premium Indices, Lipper Active Indices

== Lipper Fund Awards ==
The Lipper Fund Awards were acquired by the Reuters Group as part of its 1998 purchase of Lipper Analytical. Following the merger of Thomson Financial and Reuters, in April 2008, Lipper became part of Thomson Reuters. In 2018, following over 30 years of mutual fund awards, the Lipper Fund Awards again transferred, from Thomson Reuters to Refinitiv, as part of the Reuters divestiture of its financial and risk unit to U.S. private equity firm, the Blackstone Group.

== Research report series ==
Lipper publishes fund research reports monthly, quarterly and annually, including Fund Market Insight Reports, Fund Flows Insight Reports and Fund Industry Insight Reports.

Lipper also publishes fiduciary research reports and hedge fund research reports.

== See also ==
- Thomson Reuters
- Lipper average
- Nationally Recognized Statistical Rating Organization
