= Cam Ranh Base =

Military airport in Khánh Hòa province, Vietnam

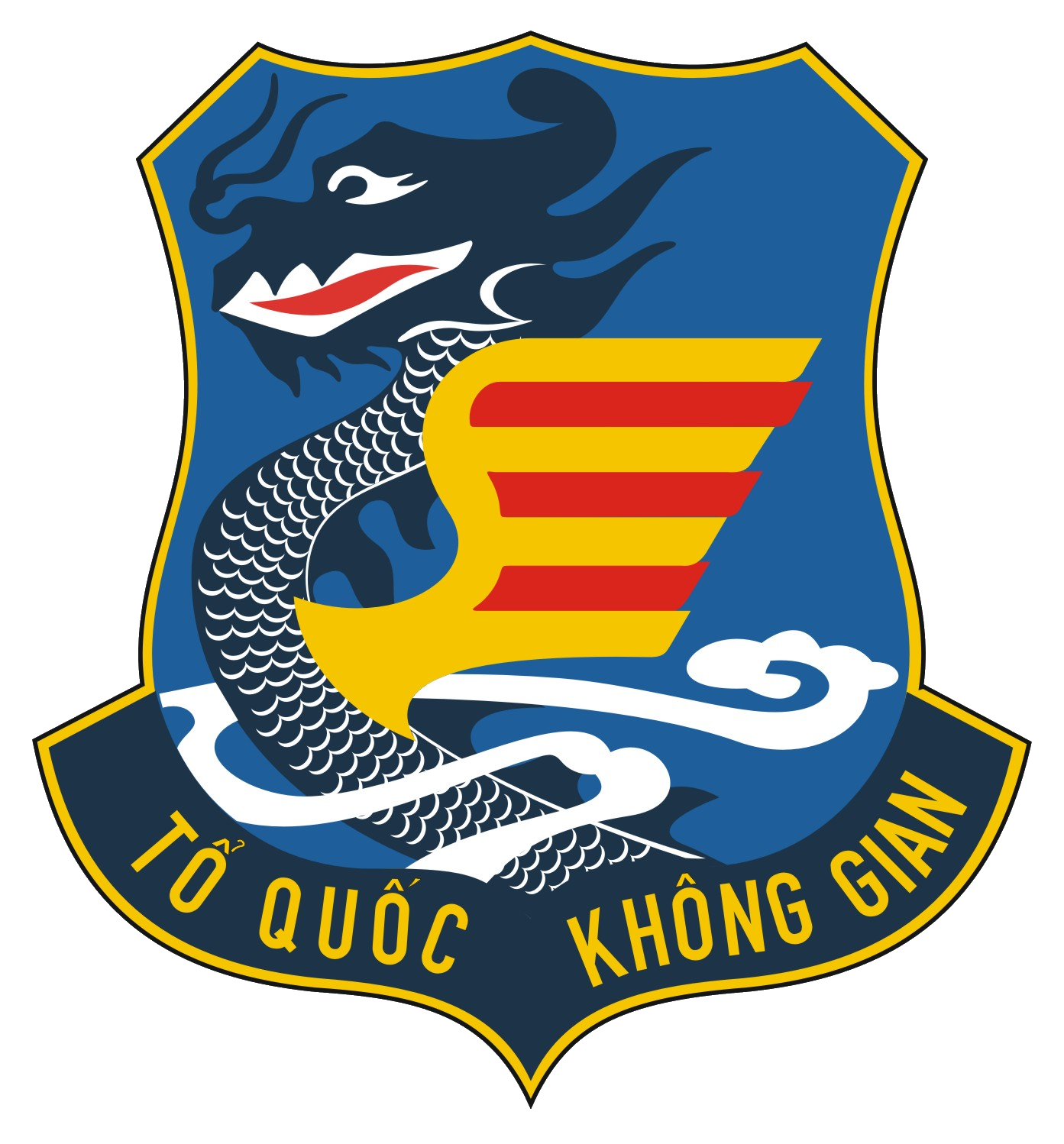
Cam Ranh Air Force Base
- Part of Pacific Air Forces (USAF); Republic of Vietnam Air Force (RVNAF); Soviet Naval Aviation; Russian Naval Aviation; Vietnam People's Air Force (VPAF)

Site information
- Type: Air Force Base
- Condition: Joint civil/military airport

Location
- Location of Cam Ranh Air Force Base, Vietnam
- Coordinates: 11°59′53″N 109°13′10″E

Site history
- Built: 1965
- In use: 1965–present
- Battles/wars: Vietnam War

Airfield information
- IATA: CXR; ICAO: VVCR

Summary
- Elevation AMSL: 39 ft (12 m)
- Interactive map of Airfield information

Runways
Direction	Length		Surface
Direction	ft	m	Surface
02L/20R	10,000	3,048	Paved
02R/20L	10,000	3,048	Paved

Cam Ranh Air Force Base is located on Cam Ranh Bay in Khánh Hòa province, Vietnam. It was one of several air bases built and used by the United States Air Force (USAF) during the Vietnam War.

Cam Ranh Air Force Base was part of the large Cam Ranh Bay logistics facility built by the United States. It was the major military seaport used by the United States for the offloading of supplies, military equipment and as a major Naval base. Army, Navy, Marine Corps and Air Force units all had compounds and units assigned to the Cam Ranh Bay facility from its opening in 1965 until its closure in 1972 as part of the drawdown of United States military forces in South Vietnam.

Between 1979 and 2002, the facility was used by the Soviet Navy and the Russian Navy.

== US military use of Cam Ranh Air Base ==
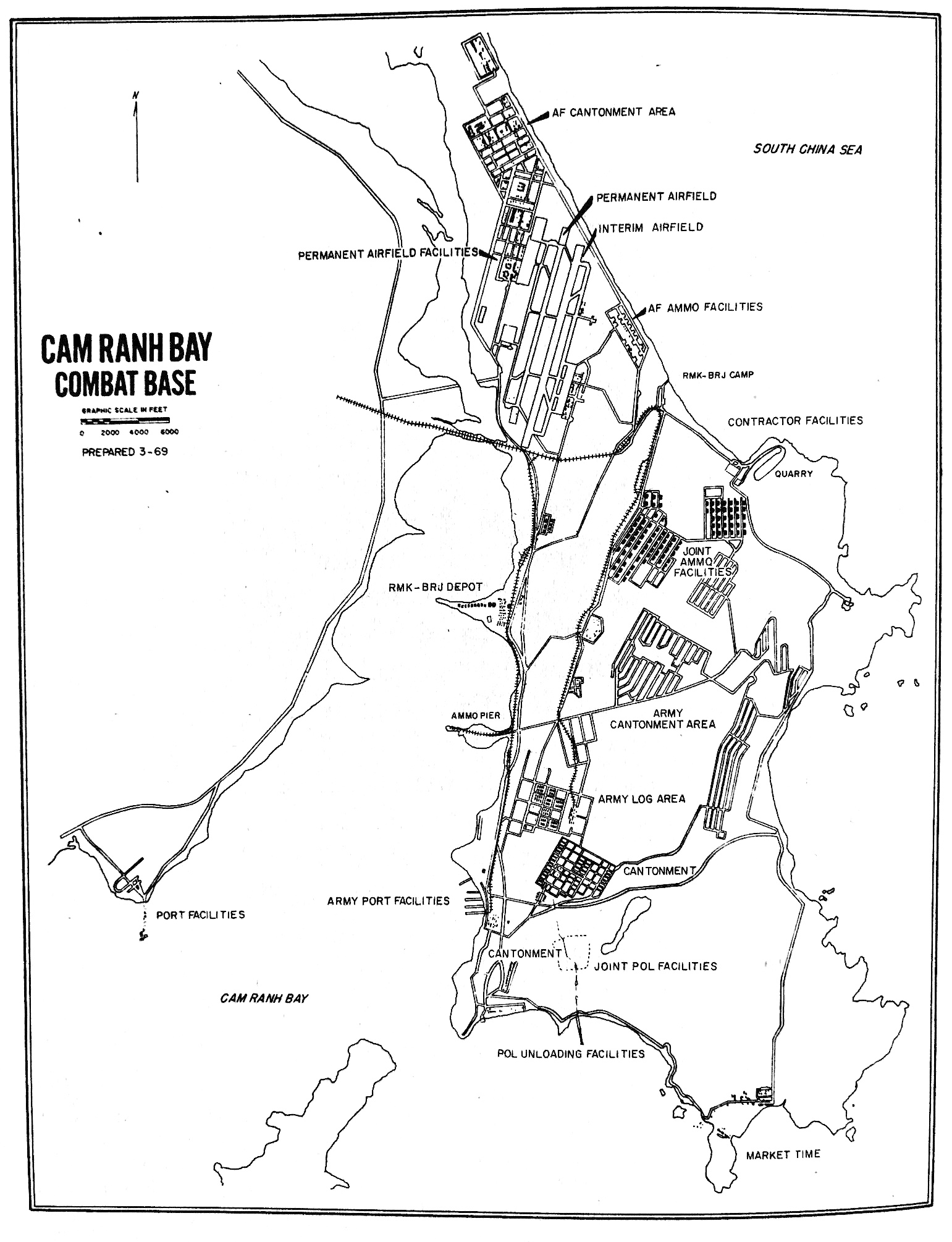
Map of US facilities at Cam Ranh Bay in 1969

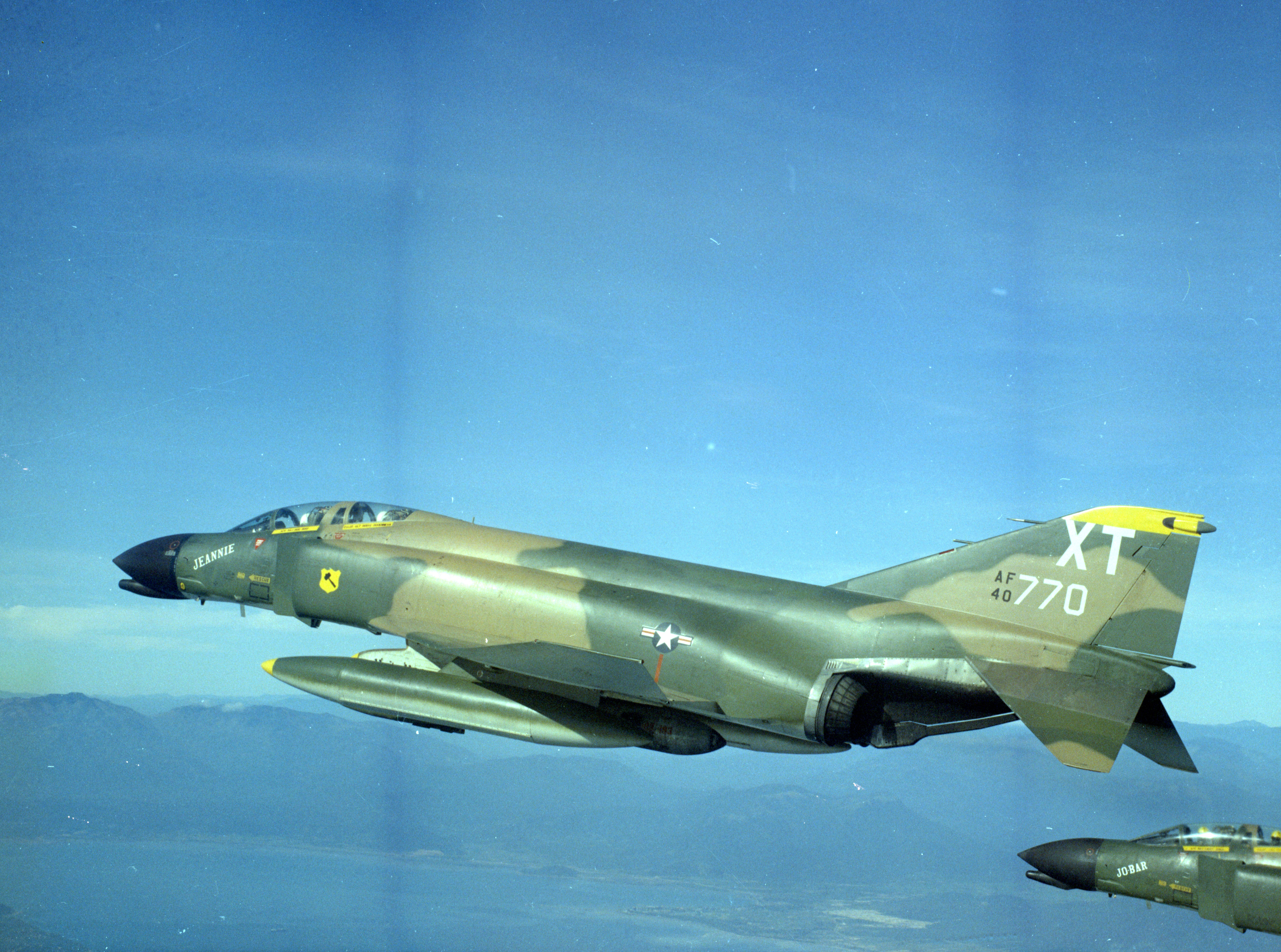
McDonnell Douglas F-4C (S/N 64-770) of the 558th Tactical Fighter Squadron, December 1968

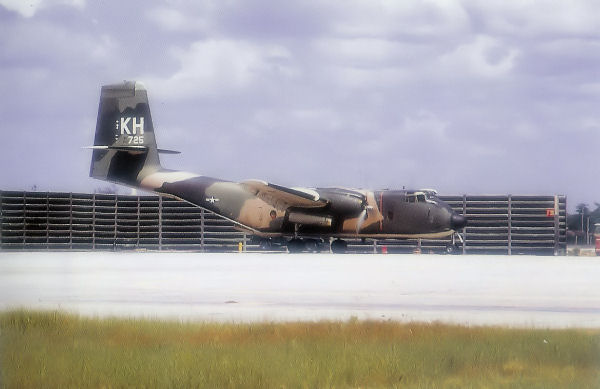
C-7B Serial No 63-9725 of the 535th Tactical Airlift Squadron, October 1971

In April 1965 CINCPAC instructed an engineering survey for a new airfield at Cam Ranh Bay.

In mid-1965, the American construction consortium RMK-BRJ was directed by the Navy Officer in Charge of Construction RVN (OICC RVN) to construct a new airfield at Cam Ranh Bay, starting with a temporary 10,000-foot (3,000 m) runway consisting of 2.2 million square feet (200,000 square meters) of AM-2 aluminum matting to accommodate jet fighter-bombers. By September, RMK-BRJ had employed 1,800 Vietnamese workers for the work, over half of whom were women. The runway was completed in 50 days, with Admiral U.S.G. Sharp, CINCPAC, laying the last AM-2 plank on 16 October 1965. The airfield was opened for U.S. Air Force operations on 1 November 1965. A 1.3 million square feet (120,000 square meters) cargo apron using pierced steel planking, airport facilities and utilities, mess halls, and 25,000 square feet (2,300 square meters) of living quarters were also prepared for use by the USAF. By the end of 1966, RMK-BRJ and OICC RVN completed construction of an additional 10,000-foot (3,000 m) concrete runway and taxiway at the air base.Once the concrete runway was built, the original AM-2 runway was to be removed and replaced with a new concrete runway. In addition between June and September US Army engineers built fuel storage areas and 30 miles (48 km) of roads and lengthened the pier before handing over the work to RMK-BMJ.

In July 1965 it was planned that three fighter squadrons would be deployed to Cam Ranh Air Base once it was completed in October. On 28 October 1965 an advance party of the 43rd Tactical Fighter Squadron arrived at the base, the squadron equipped with F-4C Phantom II fighter-bombers arrived on 1 November and began flying missions over South Vietnam the following day.

=== 12th Tactical Fighter Wing ===
On 8 November 1965 the 12th Tactical Fighter Wing was assigned to the base, being deployed from MacDill Air Force Base, Florida. The 12th TFW was the first permanently assigned F-4 Phantom II wing assigned to Southeast Asia. Operational squadrons of the wing at Cam Ranh were:

- 557th Tactical Fighter Squadron 1 December 1965 – 31 March 1970 (F-4C Tail Code: XC)
- 558th Tactical Fighter Squadron 8 November 1965 – 31 March 1970 (F-4C Tail Code: XD/XT)
- 43rd Tactical Fighter Squadron 8 November 1965 – 4 January 1966 (F-4C)
- : Replaced by: 559th Tactical Fighter Squadron 1 January 1966 – 31 March 1970 (F-4C Tail Code: XN)
- 391st Tactical Fighter Squadron 26 January 1966 – 22 July 1968 (F-4C Tail Code: XT) diverted from the still incomplete Phan Rang Air Base

From Cam Ranh AB the wing carried out close air support, interdiction, and combat air patrol activities over South Vietnam, North Vietnam and Laos.

Heavy rainfall and strong onshore winds from December 1965 to March 1966 undermined the sand base of the original aluminum mat runway and taxiways at the base, necessitating constant maintenance to smooth out bumps and replace damaged matting.

On 26 October 1966 and on 23 December 1967, US President Lyndon B. Johnson landed at the base on his only Presidential visit to South Vietnam, meeting US military personnel.

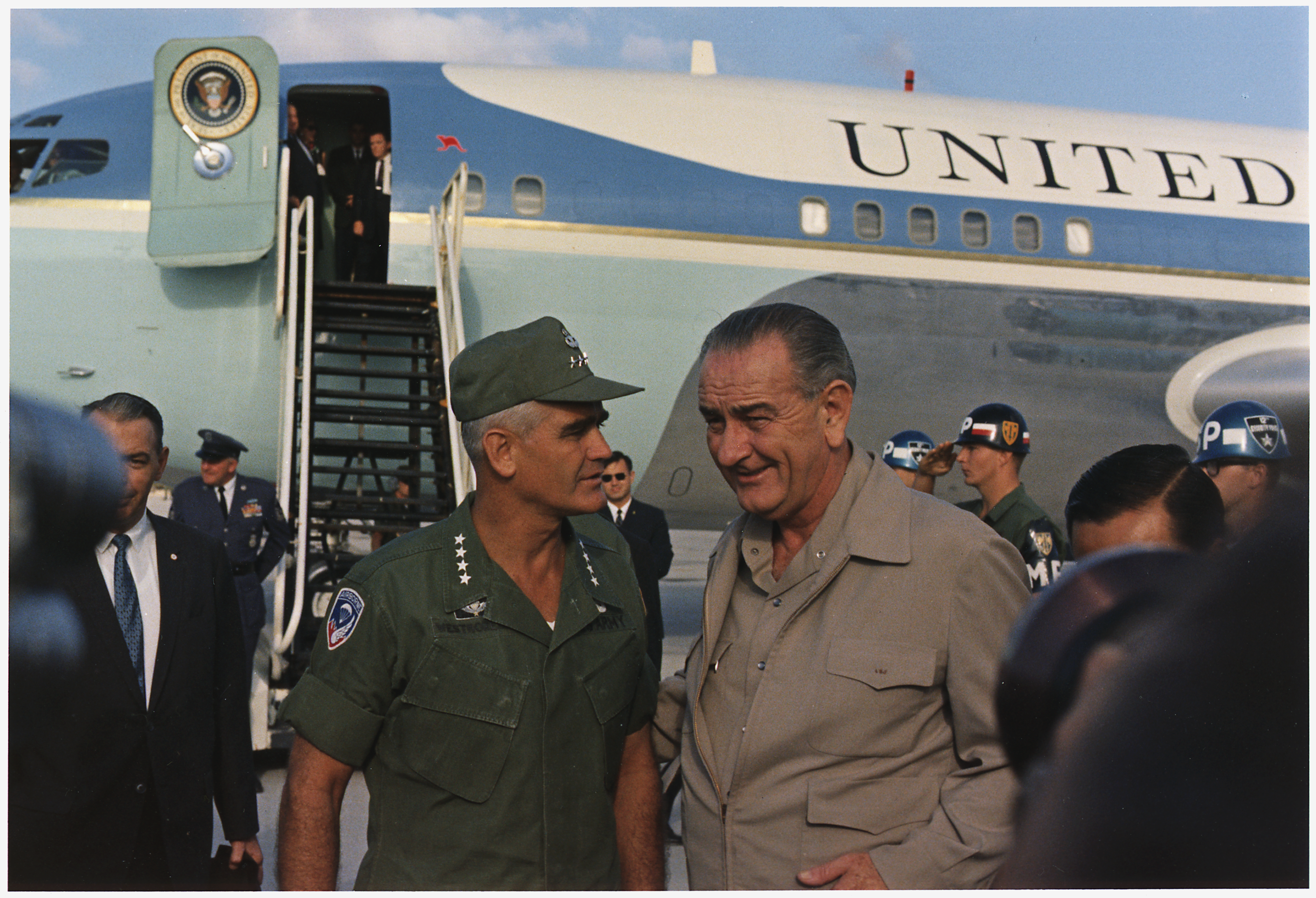
US President Lyndon Johnson with General William Westmoreland at Cam Ranh Air Base, 23 December 1967

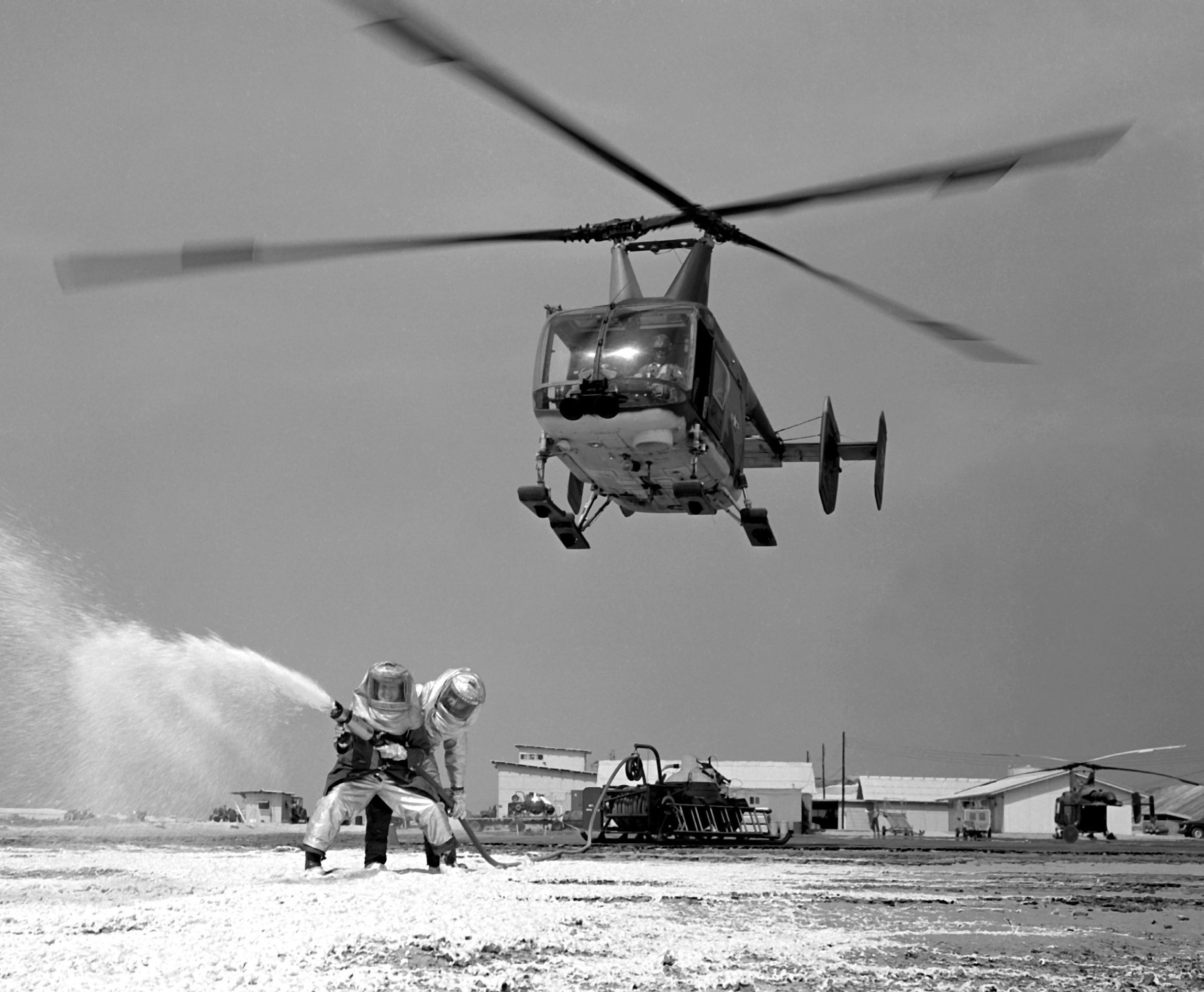
HH-43B of Detachment 8, 38th Aerospace Rescue and Recovery Squadron at Cam Ranh, January 1968

By December 1966 Cam Ranh AB reached over 27,000 aircraft movements a month. Living conditions at the base remained spartan with cramped quarters and shortages of water and electricity.

On 31 March 1970, as part of the Vietnamization process, the 12th TFW was reassigned to Phù Cát Air Base.

=== Airlift use ===
The air base was also used for strategic and tactical airlift. Cargo and personnel would arrive from the United States into the logistics facilities at Cam Ranh Bay by ship and also by large Military Air Transport Service/Military Airlift Command (MAC) transport aircraft, and then be transferred to tactical airlift for movement within South Vietnam. Outgoing cargo and personnel would also be processed through the large aerial port facility.

In November 1965 315th Air Division C-130E squadrons based in Japan, Okinawa, Taiwan and the Philippines began "shuttle" missions out of the airfield. C-130s from Tan Son Nhut Air Base and Nha Trang Air Base made pickups at Cam Ranh, as did C-123s. In May 1966 C-130As formerly used for flareship operations at Da Nang Air Base began operations from Cam Ranh and by November 1966 13 C-130As were based there.

On 1 December 1965 the 14th Aerial Port Squadron was activated at the base to manage the airfield.

In 1966 a new ramp was constructed on the west side of the airfield to handle airlift operations. Cam Ranh remained as the Air Force's primary airlift base in South Vietnam until it closed.

MAC aircraft also operated into Cam Ranh. The 6485th Operations Squadron based at Tachikawa Airfield (and later moved to Clark Air Base) stationed 4 C-118 Liftmasters on rotation at the base for casualty evacuation. On 8 July 1966 the 903d Aeromedical Evacuation Squadron was established at Tan Son Nhut AB and it maintained a detachment at Cam Ranh.

In November 1966 the first MAC C-141 Starlifter landed at Cam Ranh AB. In April 1967 medical evacuation flights began from the base to Andrews Air Force Base.

=== 483rd Tactical Airlift Wing ===
On 15 October 1966 the 483rd Troop Carrier Wing was activated at Cam Ranh under the recently activated 834th Air Division to operate the former US Army CV-2 Caribous (later redesignated C-7A) which were transferring to the USAF. Squadrons assigned to the 483rd TAW were:

- 457th Troop Carrier Squadron, 1 January 1967 – 30 April 1972 (C-7A Tail Code: KA)
- 458th Troop Carrier Squadron, 1 January 1967 – 1 March 1972 (C-7A Tail Code: KC)
- 459th Troop Carrier Squadron, 1 January 1967 – 1 June 1970 (C-7A Tail Code: KE)
- 535th Troop Carrier Squadron, 1 January 1967 – 24 January 1972 (C-7A Tail Code: KH)
- 536th Troop Carrier Squadron, 1 January 1967 – 15 October 1971 (C-7A Tail Code: KL)
- 537th Troop Carrier Squadron, 1 January 1967 – 24 January 1972 (C-7A Tail Code: KN)
- Royal Australian Air Force, No. 35 Squadron assigned to 834th Air Division, 1 January 1967 – 24 January 1972: Assigned to: Vung Tau Army Airfield

In January 1967 the 483rd Consolidated Maintenance Squadron formed at the base.

On 15 August 1967 the C-130 detachments from the 315th Air Division were assigned to the 834th Air Division as Detachment 2 and by 4 January 1968 this force numbered 35 C-130A/Cs.

Due to its location on a peninsula, Cam Ranh AB was one of the most secure USAF bases in South Vietnam and only came under attack from the mainland on the eve of 4 March 1968 when twenty-seven incoming rounds of 75mm recoilless rifle fire hit the base proper within a five-minute period. The only damage sustained was the ignition of a large fuel bladder stockpile adjacent to the main runway.

Given its security and attacks on other air bases, many transport aircraft from other less secure bases operated from Cam Ranh in early February.

With the inactivation of the 12th Tactical Fighter Wing, the 483rd became the host wing at Cam Ranh Bay on 31 March 1970.

In mid-1970 the 903d Aeromedical Evacuation Squadron moved to the base.

On 9 July 1970 the first MAC C-5 Galaxy landed at the base, due to security and congestion issues at other bases it was initially the only base used by the C-5.

On 30 August 1970 a Viet Cong (VC) rocket attack on the base destroyed two 420,000-gallon jet fuel storage tanks. On 24 May 1971 PAVN/VC sappers penetrated the base and blew up storage tanks containing 1.5 million gallons of aviation fuel. On 25 August 1971 a VC sapper attack on the base's tri-service ammunition storage area destroyed over 6000 tons of munitions with a value of more than US$10 million.

On 16 September 1970 the 39th Aerospace Rescue and Recovery Squadron equipped with HC-130Ps relocated from Tuy Hoa Air Base to Cam Ranh. In March 1971 the squadron moved to Korat Royal Thai Air Force Base.

Commencing in September 1971 the C-7 squadrons at the base began to be inactivated.

On 1 December 1971, the wing was reassigned from the 834th Air Division directly to Headquarters, Seventh Air Force at Tan Son Nhut AB. It gained a tactical electronic warfare mission in mid-1971 and a special operations mission in the autumn of 1971. These squadrons were:

- 20th Special Operations Squadron, 1 September 1971 – 1 April 1972 (UH–1P, No Tail Code)
- 90th Special Operations Squadron, 1 September 1971 – 15 April 1972
- 360th Tactical Electronic Warfare Squadron, 31 August 1971 – 1 February 1972 (EC-47N/P/Q Tail Code: AJ)
- 361st Tactical Electronic Warfare Squadron, 31 August – 1 December 1971 (EC-47N/P/Q Tail Code: AL)
- 362nd Tactical Electronic Warfare Squadron, 31 August 1971 – 1 February 1972 (EC-47N/P/Q C-47H Tail Code: AN)

For its service in Vietnam, the 483rd was awarded two Presidential Unit Citations (21 January – 12 May 1968; 1 April – 30 June 1970) and three Air Force Outstanding Unit Awards with combat "V" device (1 January – 30 April 1967; 1 May 1967 – 30 April 1968; 1 July 1970 – 31 December 1971).

== USAF withdrawal and South Vietnamese use of Cam Ranh Air Base ==
Beginning on 1 January 1972, the 483d Tactical Airlift Wing phased down its activities, and active flying ended by 31 March. The unit was inactivated and Cam Ranh Air Base was turned over to the South Vietnamese government on 15 May 1972, ending USAF use of the facility.

After the turnover to the South Vietnamese the base was largely abandoned. It was, quite simply, much too big for the Vietnamese to use. The base was slowly looted for its usable equipment, such as air conditioners, desks, refrigerators, and other furniture along with windows, doors and corrugated tin roofs from the buildings left by the Americans, leaving what could be categorized as a deteriorating ghost town of abandoned buildings.

The Republic of Vietnam Air Force (RVNAF) used the airfield as a storage facility for many of their A-1 Skyraiders, while their replacement jet F-5s and A-37s were used in operations against the PAVN from other, smaller bases.

On 3 April 1975 the PAVN 10th Division advanced on Cam Ranh Bay and despite scattered resistance from the Army of the Republic of Vietnam and RVNAF airstrikes by 14:00 they had captured the entire base area.

== Soviet and Russian use of Cam Ranh facilities ==
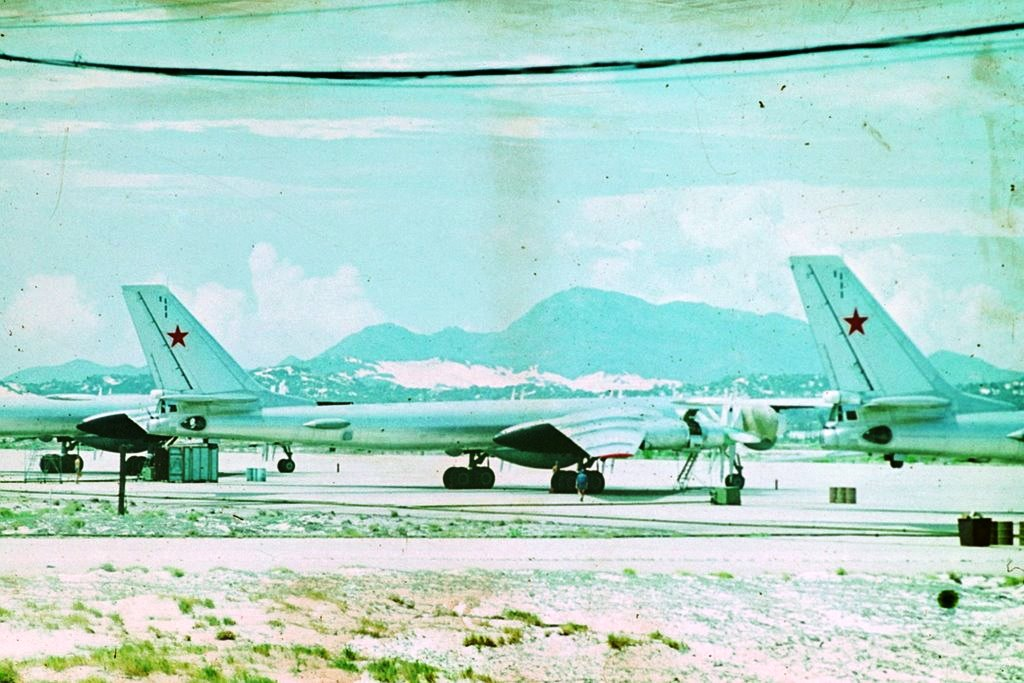
The base during the Soviet era (Tu-142Ms pictured)

In 1979, the Soviet Union started leasing the base rent-free from Vietnam under a 25-year leasing treaty. The base, aside from serving as a communications and signal-intelligence collection centre, eased Soviet logistical support of its naval forces that were deployed in the South China Sea and the Indian Ocean. The base was especially important given the nature of the Soviet Union's Pacific bases in the Far East, which, unlike the warm-water Cam Ranh Base, were restricted to various degrees due to ice. The first Soviet naval ships arrived at the base in March 1979. In addition to the two piers, the Soviets added five more, as well as building two dry docks, installations to admit nuclear submarines, fuel and weapons storage facilities, and barracks. Under Soviet administration, Cam Ranh became its largest naval base for forward deployment outside the Warsaw Pact. Some 20 ships were berthed daily at the base, along with six attack submarines.

In addition, Soviet Naval Aviation (A-VMF) stationed MiG-23 fighters, Tupolev Tu-16s, Tupolev Tu-95s, and Tupolev Tu-142 maritime reconnaissance aircraft at Cam Ranh Air Base. From 1982 to 1989, the 169th Guards Mixed Aviation Regiment, Soviet Naval Aviation, flew Tu-16 and Tu-16K tankers (1st Squadron); Tu-95RTS and Tu-142M were flown 1982–1993 with the regiment's 2nd Squadron; and MiG-23MLD, late 1984–1989 (3rd Squadron). From November 1986 to December 1993 the regiment reported directly to the Soviet Pacific Fleet. During the 1980s many Tokyo Express flights went to and from the base, sometimes violating Japanese airspace.

By 1989 offensive weapons, including the MiG-23s and Tu-16s, had been withdrawn and the number of personnel was halved to 2,500 from a high of 5,000.

The Russian government continued the earlier Soviet arrangement in a 1993 agreement that allowed for the continued use of the base for signal intelligence, primarily on Chinese communications in the South China Sea. By this time, Russian aircraft had been withdrawn, with only support personnel for the listening station remaining.

In June 2001, the Vietnamese government announced that following the expiration of Russia's lease in 2004, Vietnam would "not sign an agreement with any country to use Cam Ranh Bay for military purposes". On 17 October that year, the Russian government announced that it would withdraw from Cam Ranh Bay completely before its rent-free lease was to expire in 2004, due to what was assumed to be a dwindling defense budget. The reversion of the base back to Vietnamese control took place on 2 May 2002.

On 25 November 2014, an agreement was signed during a visit to Sochi by Nguyễn Phú Trọng, that established standards of use of Russian warships in the port of Cam Ranh: Russian ships would only have to give prior notice to the Vietnamese authorities before calling on Cam Ranh Bay, while other foreign navies would be limited to only one annual ship visit to Vietnamese ports.

In January 2015, Russia's Defense Ministry said that Russian Il-78 tanker aircraft had used Cam Ranh Bay in the previous year, enabling the refueling of the Tu-95 strategic bombers conducting flights in the Asia-Pacific region.

== Current use ==
On 19 May 2004, after major reconstruction, Cam Ranh International Airport received its first commercial flight. Cam Ranh remains a minor base of the Vietnam People's Air Force, housing the 920th Training Squadron. Vietnam Naval Air Force also operates a small VTOL runway within the base.

== See also ==
- Republic of Vietnam Air Force
- Soviet Air Force
- Russian Air Force
