= Lipper average =

Lipper Average also known as Lipper Index are a series of indices produced by Lipper, a subsidiary of Thomson Reuters, that establish benchmarks to measure the performance of a portfolio, or of various mutual funds and exchange-traded funds. They allow an investor, a portfolio manager, or an institutional investor to compare the performance of their investment portfolio against other, similar investments. Historical trends, strengths and weaknesses can be evaluated.

Each index consists of the 30 largest mutual funds for each category. Investments are grouped by sector, industry, country, and market capitalization. Lipper indices enable anyone to benchmark a portfolio against other competitors, rather than against passive indices. The Wall Street Journal and Barron's carry some of the information supplied by Lipper Analytical Services on a regular basis.

== See also ==
- Valuation
- Valuation using multiples
