= Tokyo Express (flights) =

Russian military flights

The Tokyo Express (東京急行, Tōkyō kyūkō) is a term for regular flights by Soviet (and later Russian) military aircraft past Japan. They sometimes involve violations of Japanese airspace and have often been intercepted by fighter aircraft of the Japan Air Self-Defense Force.

During the Cold War the flights tended to take place along the Sea of Japan side of the country. During the Cold War Tupolev Tu-16, Tupolev Tu-95 and Myasishchev M-4 aircraft were used. Some of them were transiting to or from Cam Ranh Base in southern Vietnam. The Soviet Union started using the base in 1979.

After the Cold War ended Russia dramatically reduced its flights and stopped using Cam Ranh Base. However, from 2007 Russia re-started regular flights, which now often take place on the Pacific Ocean side of Japan. In this second iteration, Tupolev Tu-22M, Tupolev Tu-95 and Tupolev Tu-142 aircraft are used. As of 2015 Russian aircraft have begun using Cam Ranh Base again, including for Il-78 tankers to support bomber flights in the Pacific.

Since 2019, the People's Liberation Army Air Force has also joined this operation, mainly using Xian H-6 and Shenyang J-16 to fly with the Russian fleet.

== See also ==
- Violations of Japanese airspace
