= Tass River =

Coordinates: 42°27′S 171°59′E

Location
- Country: New Zealand

Physical characteristics
- Mouth
  - location: Grey River
- Length: 10 km (6.2 mi)

The Tass River is a river of the West Coast Region of New Zealand's South Island. It flows predominantly northeast from its origins in the Southern Alps east of Lake Hochstetter, reaching the Upper Grey River close to the southern tip of the Victoria Forest Park.

== See also ==
- List of rivers of New Zealand
