= Trading Advisor Selection System =

The Trading Advisor Selection System (TASS), or Lipper TASS, database contains monthly data for hedge funds. It is one of the most representative database for hedge funds, containing over 7000 of actively reporting hedge funds. Typical information contained in the database are monthly returns, fee structure, and some specific information as the investments type, strategic focus. The monthly data goes back to at least May 1973 and is often used by researches for large-scale data analysis.

Funds that do not report returns anymore (closed funds, liquidated funds for example) formed the TASS Graveyard database, which contains over 6000 funds.

In March 2005, Lipper acquired TASS Research and the TASS database from Tremont Capital.
