= 558th Flying Training Squadron =

558th Flying Training Squadron

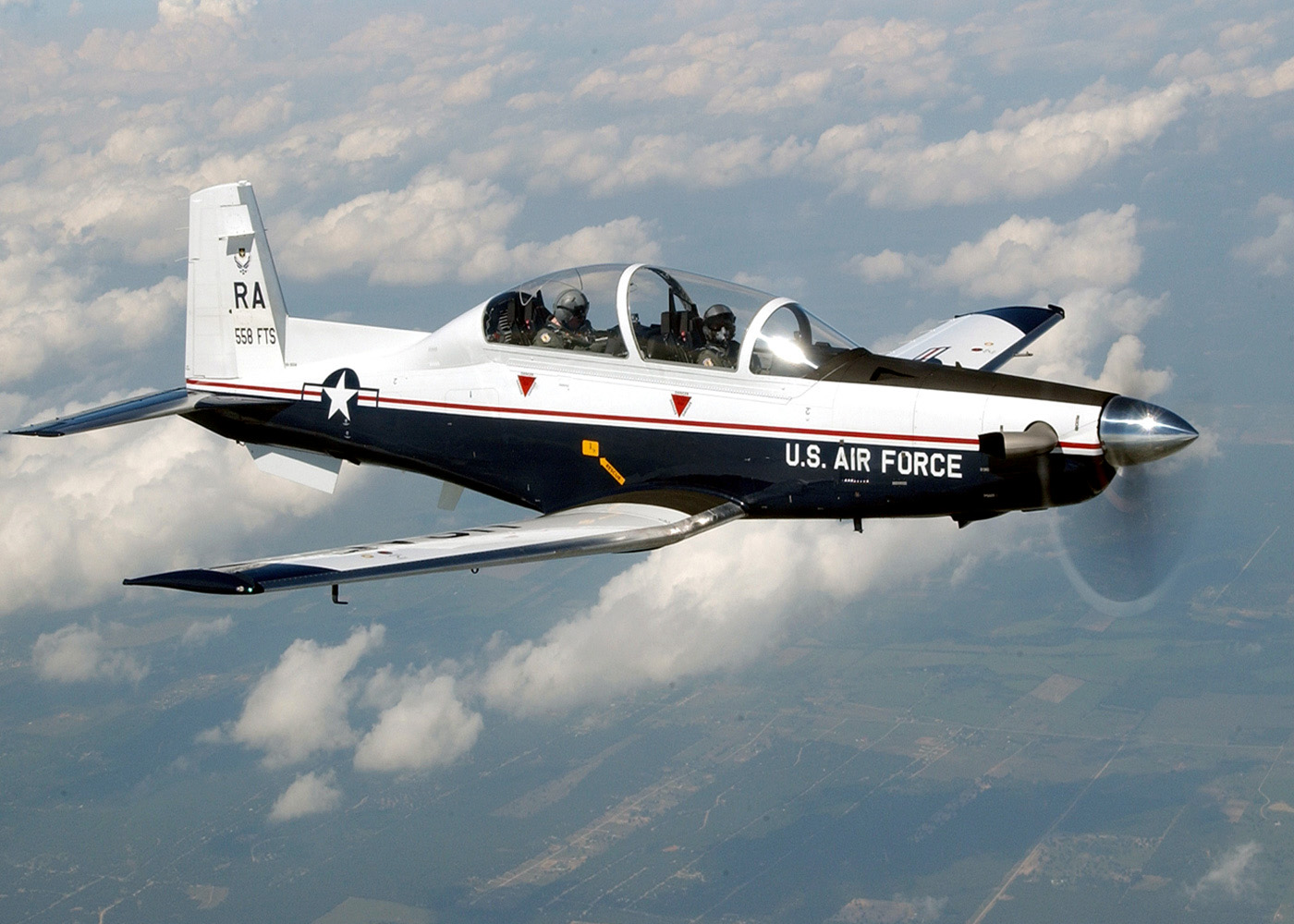
- 558th Flying Training Squadron T-6A Texan II
- Active: 1942–1945; 1962–1970; 1992–1996; 2002–2006; 2010–present
- Country: United States
- Branch: United States Air Force
- Role: Flying Training
- Part of: Air Education and Training Command
- Nickname: Phantom Knights
- Mottos: Semper Vigilamus (Latin for 'We are Always Vigilant') Viridia Cornua Regunt “Green Horns Rule”
- Engagements: European Theater of Operations; Vietnam War
- Decorations: Distinguished Unit Citation; Air Force Outstanding Unit Award with Combat "V" Device; Air Force Outstanding Unit Award; Republic of Vietnam Gallantry Cross with Palm

Insignia
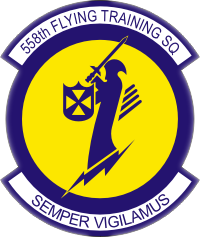
- 558th Flying Training Squadron emblem (Note: Approved 25 August 1995.)

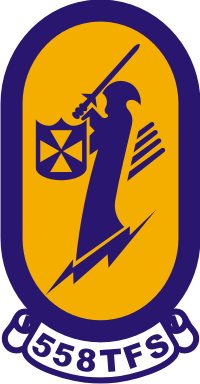
- 558th Tactical Fighter Squadron emblem (Note: Approved 17 May 1965,)

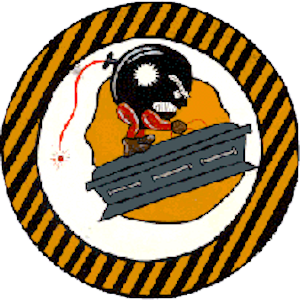
- Unofficial 558th Bombardment Squadron emblem
- World War II fuselage code: KX

The 558th Flying Training Squadron is a United States Air Force unit assigned to the 12th Flying Training Wing at Randolph Air Force Base, Texas. The squadron trains Remotely Piloted Aircraft pilots.

The first predecessor of the squadron is the 558th Bombardment Squadron, which was organized in 1942 as a Martin B-26 Marauder unit. After training in the United States, it deployed to the European Theater of Operations, operating from England, and later from Advanced Landing Grounds on the European continent. The squadron was awarded the Distinguished Unit Citation for supporting beleaguered ground troops during the Battle of the Bulge. After V-E Day, the squadron returned to the United States and was inactivated at the port of embarkation, Camp Kilmer, New Jersey on 12 November 1945.

The squadron's other predecessor is the 558th Tactical Fighter Squadron organized as part of the Air Force's first McDonnell F-4 Phantom II wing. The squadron served in combat in the Vietnam War until its inactivation in 1970. The two squadrons were consolidated in 1985 and activated as a flying training unit in 1992.

== History ==
=== World War II ===
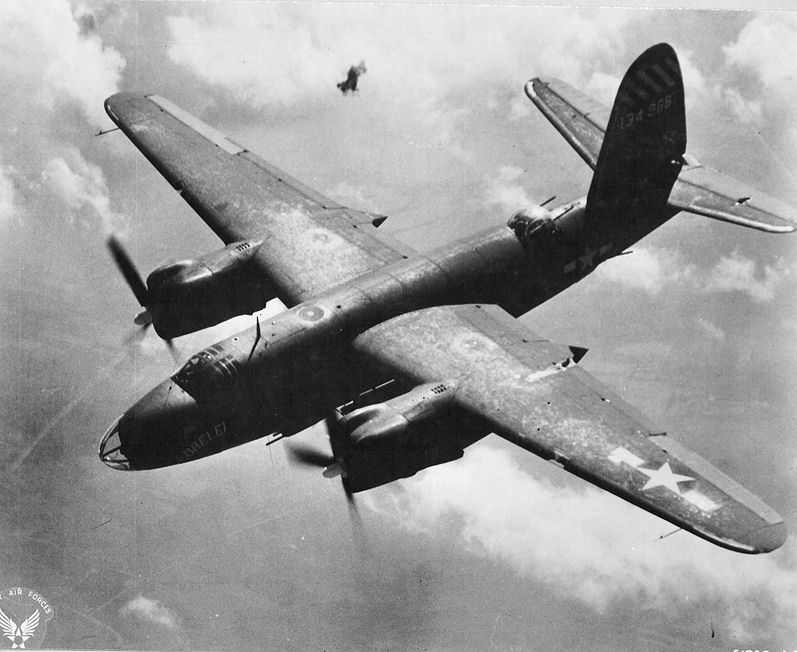
558th Bomb Sq B-26 Marauder (Note: Aircraft is Martin B-26C-15-MO Marauder, serial 41-34968 Lorelei. This plane was shot down on 23 June 1944. Baugher, Joe (1 April 2023). "1941 USAF Serial Numbers". Joe Baugher.)

The first predecessor of the squadron is the 558th Bombardment Squadron, which was activated at MacDill Field, Florida on 1 December 1942 as one of the four squadrons of the 387th Bombardment Group and trained at bases in the southeastern United States with Martin B-26 Marauder medium bombers until June 1943, when it deployed to the European Theater of Operations. The squadron's ground echelon departed for the port of embarkation on 10 June and sailed on the RMS Queen Mary on 23 June, while the air echelon ferried its Marauders to England via the northern ferrying route.

The squadron established itself at its first base in Europe, RAF Chipping Ongar at the beginning of July 1943. Although the squadron initially trained for low level attacks, VIII Air Support Command, in consultation with the Royal Air Force, decided to employ its B-26 units in attacks at medium altitude, mirroring a decision made earlier in the Mediterranean Theater of Operations. The squadron flew its first combat mission on 15 August, with initial operations focusing on German airfields near the coast of France, in an effort to force the Luftwaffe to withdraw its interceptors from the coastal belt, reducing their effectiveness against heavy bombers passing through on their way to strike targets deeper in occupied Europe. By early September, the squadron adopted a tactic first employed by the 386th Bombardment Group, where all bombers in a formation dropped their bombs based on the lead aircraft, rather than individually, to achieve a greater concentration of bombs on the intended target. September 1943 would prove the busiest while the squadron was part of Eighth Air Force as B-26s made heavy attacks on airfields and communications sites near Boulogne as part of Operation Starkey, an attempt to make the Germans believe an invasion of France was imminent. On 9 October 1943, the squadron flew what would prove to be the last B-26 mission flown by Eighth Air Force.

In October, Ninth Air Force moved to England to take over tactical operations operating from England, building on the core of B-26 units already there. During the winter of 1943-1944, the squadron made numerous attacks on V-1 flying bomb and V-2 rocket sites. During Big Week, the squadron attacked Leeuwarden and Venlo Airfields. In the spring of 1944, the squadron attacked coastal defenses and bridges prior to Operation Overlord, the invasion of Normandy. On D-Day, it attacked targets along the coast, and supported ground forces during June 1944 by attacking line of communication targets and fuel dumps. In late July, the squadron supported Operation Cobra, the breakout at Saint Lo. During August, it attacked German forces at Brest, France.

The squadron moved to France in September, when it began operations from Maupertuis Airfield. For the rest of the war, it operated from Advanced Landing Grounds in Europe; advancing eastward with Allied ground forces. Is operations from advanced fields permitted its first attacks directly on targets in Germany by the fall of 1944. During the Battle of the Bulge, it attacked strongly defended communications and transportation targets at Mayen and Pruem, for which it was awarded a Distinguished Unit Citation. It continued to support the Allied advance into Germany, flying its last combat mission in April 1945.

After V-E Day the squadron moved to Rosieres-en-Santerre Airfield, France, where it remained until returning to the United States for inactivation in November 1945.

=== Vietnam War ===
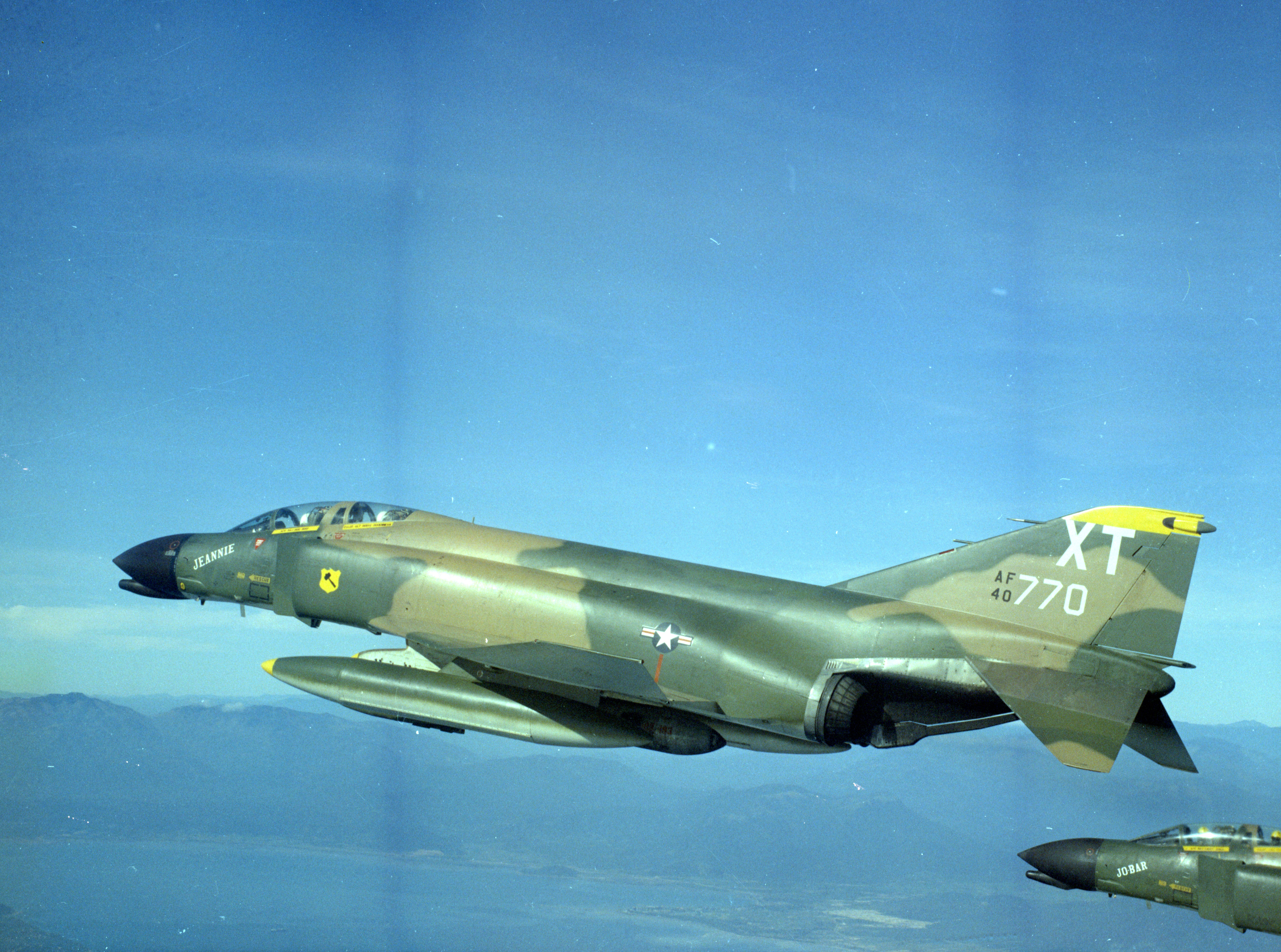
558th Squadron Phantom over South Vietnam (Note: Aircraft is McDonnel F-4C-23-MC, serial 64-770, Jeannie. It was later assigned to the Illinois and Oregon Air National Guard. It is now on display at Seymour Johnson AFB, NC. Baugher, Joe (7 April 2023). "1964 USAF Serial Numbers". Joe Baugher.)

The second predecessor of the squadron was the 558th Tactical Fighter Squadron, which was activated at MacDill Air Force Base, Florida in April 1962 as part of the 12th Tactical Fighter Wing, the initial McDonnell F-4 Phantom II fighter unit in the Air Force. The F-4Cs designed for the Air Force were not yet in production at that time. In order to get the squadron operational, second-line Republic F-84F Thunderstreaks were transferred from the Air National Guard. The squadron received Navy F-4Bs for training and then F-4Cs in January 1964. In the March 1965, the squadron deployed to Naha Air Base, Okinawa to augment the air defenses there, and was attached to the 51st Fighter-Interceptor Wing there. It returned to MacDill in June.

The squadron deployed to Vietnam in November 1965, the first 12th Wing squadron to locate at Cam Ranh Bay Air Base. The squadron flew close air support, interdiction, rescue combat patrol, MiG Cap, and other missions. During the Pueblo Crisis, in February 1968, the squadron deployed to Kunsan Air Base, South Korea, returning in July. In March 1970, fighter operations at Cam Rahn Bay ended and the 12th Wing turned the base over to the 483d Tactical Airlift Wing. Wing headquarters moved to Phu Cat Air Base on 31 March, replacing the 37th Tactical Fighter Wing, while the 558th and the wing's other fighter squadrons were inactivated. The two predecessor squadrons were consolidated in September 1985 as the 558th Tactical Air Support Squadron, but were never active under that name.

=== Flying training ===
The squadron was redesignated the 558th Flying Training Squadron and activated in December 1992. It was assigned to the 12th Operations Group at Randolph Air Force Base, and provided undergraduate navigator training with the Boeing T-43 Bobcat from 15 December 1992 to its inactivation on 1 October 1996. It was again activated with the same assignment and station on 16 January 2002 to provide pilot instructor training with the Beechcraft T-6 Texan II until its inactivation on 28 September 2006. The squadron was reactivated a third time with the same assignment and station in May 2010 for undergraduate Remotely Piloted Aircraft (RPA) pilot and sensor operator training. Currently the 558th serves as the sole point for RPA pilot instrument qualification. The RPA pilot community is also the largest tactical aviation community in the Air Force. Per year, the 558th outputs significantly more tactical aviators than the Bomber and Fighter communities combined.

== Lineage ==
558th Bombardment Squadron

- Constituted as the 558th Bombardment Squadron (Medium) on 25 November 1942

Activated on 1 December 1942
Redesignated 558th Bombardment Squadron, Medium on 9 October 1944
Inactivated on 12 Nov 1945

- Consolidated with the 558th Tactical Fighter Squadron as the 558th Tactical Air Support Squadron on 19 September 1985

558th Flying Training Squadron

- Constituted as the 558th Tactical Fighter Squadron and activated on 17 April 1962 (not organized)

Organized on 25 April 1962
Inactivated on 31 March 1970

- Consolidated with the 558th Bombardment Squadron Squadron as the 558th Tactical Air Support Squadron on 19 September 1985 (remained inactive)
- Redesignated 558th Flying Training Squadron on 14 December 1992

Activated on 15 December 1992
Inactivated on 1 October 1996

- Activated on 16 January 2002

Inactivated on 28 September 2006

- Activated on 20 May 2010

=== Assignments ===
- 387th Bombardment Group, 1 December 1942 – 12 November 1945
- Tactical Air Command, 17 April 1962 (not organized)
- 12th Tactical Fighter Wing, 25 April 1962 – 31 March 1970 (attached to 51st Fighter-Interceptor Wing, 9 March–9 June 1965; 18th Tactical Fighter Wing, 3 February–22 July 1968
- 12th Operations Group, 15 December 1992 – 1 October 1996
- 12th Operations Group, 16 January 2002 – 28 September 2006
- 12th Operations Group, 20 May 2010 – present

=== Stations ===
- MacDill Field, Florida, 1 December 1942
- Drane Field, Florida, 12 April 1943
- Godman Field, Kentucky, 12 May-10 June 1943
- RAF Chipping Ongar (AAF-162), England, 1 July 1943
- RAF Stoney Cross (AAF-452), England, c. 21 July 1944
- Maupertuis Airfield (A-15), France, c. 1 September 1944
- Chateaudun Airfield (A-39), France, c. 18 September 1944
- Clastres Airfield (A-71), France, c. 4 November 1944
- Maastricht Airfield (Y-44), Netherlands, c. 4 May 1945
- Rosieres-en-Santerre Airfield (B-87), France, 30 May–c. November 1945
- Camp Kilmer, New Jersey, 11–12 November 1945
- MacDill Air Force Base, Florida, 25 April 1962 – November 1965 (deployed to Naha Air Base, Okinawa, 9 March–9 June 1965)
- Cam Ranh Air Base, South Vietnam, c. 14 November 1965 – 31 March 1970 (deployed to Kunsan Air Base, South Korea, 3 February–22 July 1968
- Randolph Air Force Base, Texas, 15 December 1992 – 1 October 1996
- Randolph Air Force Base, Texas, 16 January 2002 – 28 September 2006
- Randolph Air Force Base, Texas, 20 May 2010 – present

=== Aircraft ===
- Martin B-26 Marauder (1942–1945)
- Republic F-84 Thunderstreak (1962–1963)
- McDonnell F-4 Phantom II (1963–1970)
- Boeing T-43 Bobcat (1992–1996)
- Beechcraft T-6 Texan II (2002–2006)
- General Atomics MQ-1 Predator (2010–present)

=== Awards and campaigns ===
| Award streamer | Award | Dates | Notes |
|---|---|---|---|
| | Presidential Unit Citation | Germany 23 December 1944 | 558th Bombardment Squadron |
| | Air Force Outstanding Unit Award with Combat "V" Device | 13 November 1965–30 May 1966 | 558th Tactical Fighter Squadron |
| | Air Force Outstanding Unit Award with Combat "V" Device | 1 June 1966–31 May 1967 | 558th Tactical Fighter Squadron |
| | Air Force Outstanding Unit Award with Combat "V" Device | 1 June 1967–31 May 1968 | 558th Tactical Fighter Squadron |
| | Air Force Outstanding Unit Award with Combat "V" Device | 1 June 1968–31 May 1969 | 558th Tactical Fighter Squadron |
| | Air Force Outstanding Unit Award with Combat "V" Device | 1 June 1969–31 March 1970 | 558th Tactical Fighter Squadron |
| | Air Force Outstanding Unit Award | 15 December 1992-30 June 1993 | 558th Flying Training Squadron |
| | Air Force Outstanding Unit Award | 1 July 1993-30 June 1994 | 558th Flying Training Squadron |
| | Air Force Outstanding Unit Award | 1 July 1995-30 June 1996 | 558th Flying Training Squadron |
| | Air Force Outstanding Unit Award | 1 July 2002-30 June 2004 | 558th Flying Training Squadron |
| | Air Force Outstanding Unit Award | 1 July 2004-30 June 2006 | 558th Flying Training Squadron |
| | Air Force Outstanding Unit Award | 20 May 2010-30 June 2011 | 558th Flying Training Squadron |
| | Air Force Outstanding Unit Award | 1 July 2011-30 June 2013 | 558th Flying Training Squadron |
| | Air Force Outstanding Unit Award | 1 July 2013-30 June 2015 | 558th Flying Training Squadron |
| | Air Force Outstanding Unit Award | 1 July 2015-30 June 2017 | 558th Flying Training Squadron |
| | Vietnamese Gallantry Cross with Palm | 15 October 1965-10 March 1970 | 558th Tactical Fighter Squadron |

| Campaign Streamer | Campaign | Dates | Notes |
|---|---|---|---|
| | Air Offensive, Europe | 1 July 1943 – 5 June 1944 | 558th Bombardment Squadron |
| | Normandy | 6 June 1944 – 24 July 1944 | 558th Bombardment Squadron |
| | Northern France | 25 July 1944 – 14 September 1944 | 558th Bombardment Squadron |
| | Rhineland | 15 September 1944 – 21 March 1945 | 558th Bombardment Squadron |
| | Ardennes-Alsace | 16 December 1944 – 25 January 1945 | 558th Bombardment Squadron |
| | Central Europe | 22 March 1944 – 21 May 1945 | 558th Bombardment Squadron |
| | Vietnam Defensive | November 1965–30 January 1966 | 558th Tactical Fighter Squadron |
| | Vietnam Air | 31 January 1966 – 28 June 1966 | 558th Tactical Fighter Squadron |
| | Vietnam Air Offensive | 29 June 1966 – 8 March 1967 | 558th Tactical Fighter Squadron |
| | Vietnam Air Offensive, Phase II | 9 March 1967 – 31 March 1968 | 558th Tactical Fighter Squadron |
| | Vietnam Air/Ground | 22 January 1968 – 7 July 1968 | 558th Tactical Fighter Squadron |
| | Vietnam Air Offensive, Phase III | 1 April 1968 – 31 October 1968 | 558th Tactical Fighter Squadron |
| | Vietnam Air Offensive, Phase IV | 1 November 1968 – 22 February 1969 | 558th Tactical Fighter Squadron |
| | Tet 1969/Counteroffensive | 23 February 1969 – 8 June 1969 | 558th Tactical Fighter Squadron |
| | Vietnam Summer-Fall 1969 | 9 June 1969 – 31 October 1969 | 558th Tactical Fighter Squadron |
| | Vietnam Winter-Spring 1970 | 3 November 1969 – 10 March 1970 | 558th Tactical Fighter Squadron |
