= 24th Helicopter Squadron =

24th Helicopter Squadron

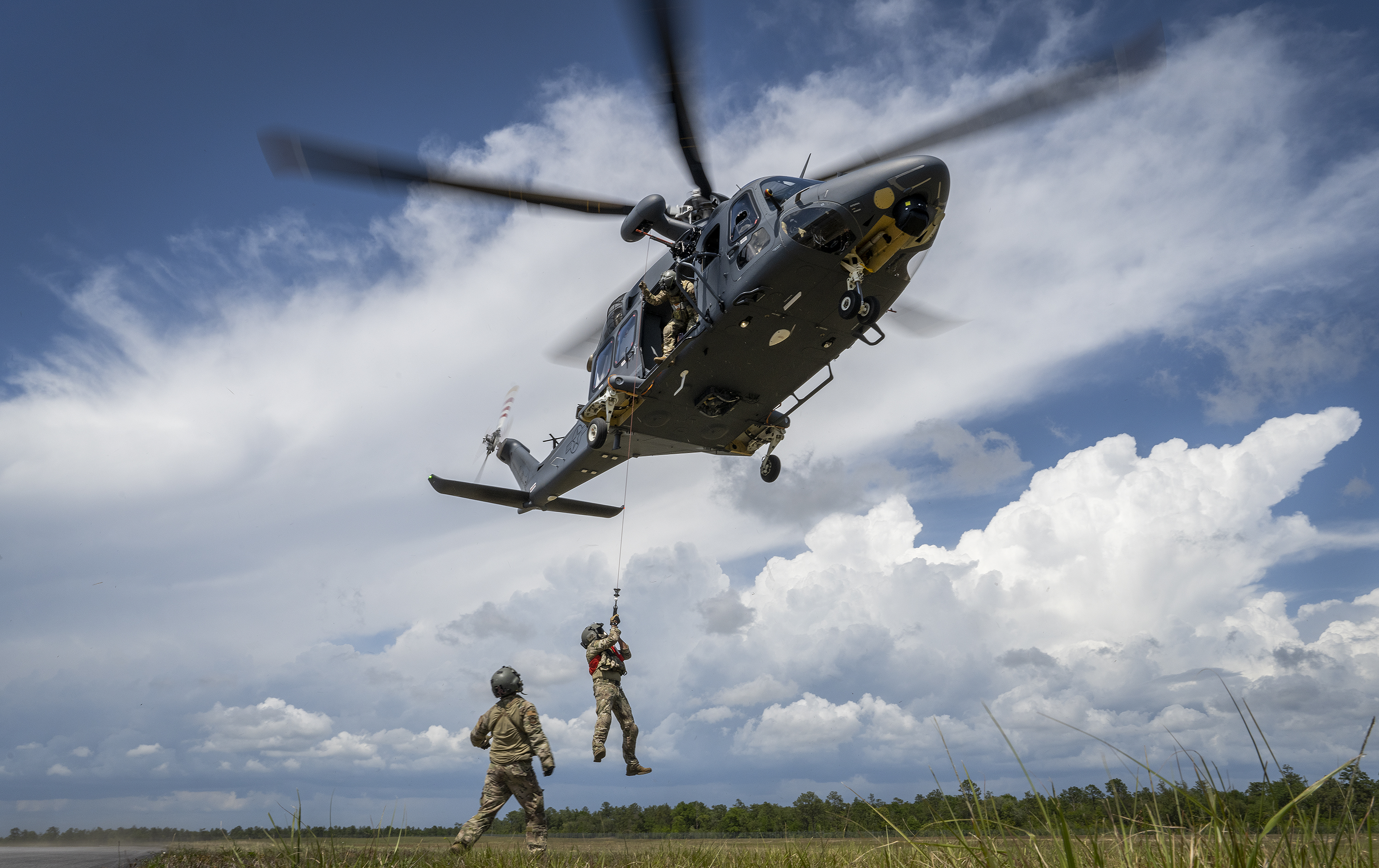
- An MH-139A Grey Wolf lifts a special mission aviator into the air during testing
- Active: 1939–1942; 1942–1946; 1947–1949; 1951–1953; 1956–1960; 1969–1975; 1976–1991; 2018–2022; 2024–present
- Country: United States
- Branch: United States Air Force
- Role: Helicopter training
- Part of: Air Education and Training Command
- Garrison/HQ: Maxwell AFB, Alabama
- Nickname: Golden Jaguars
- Engagements: China Burma India Theater
- Decorations: Air Force Outstanding Unit Award

Insignia
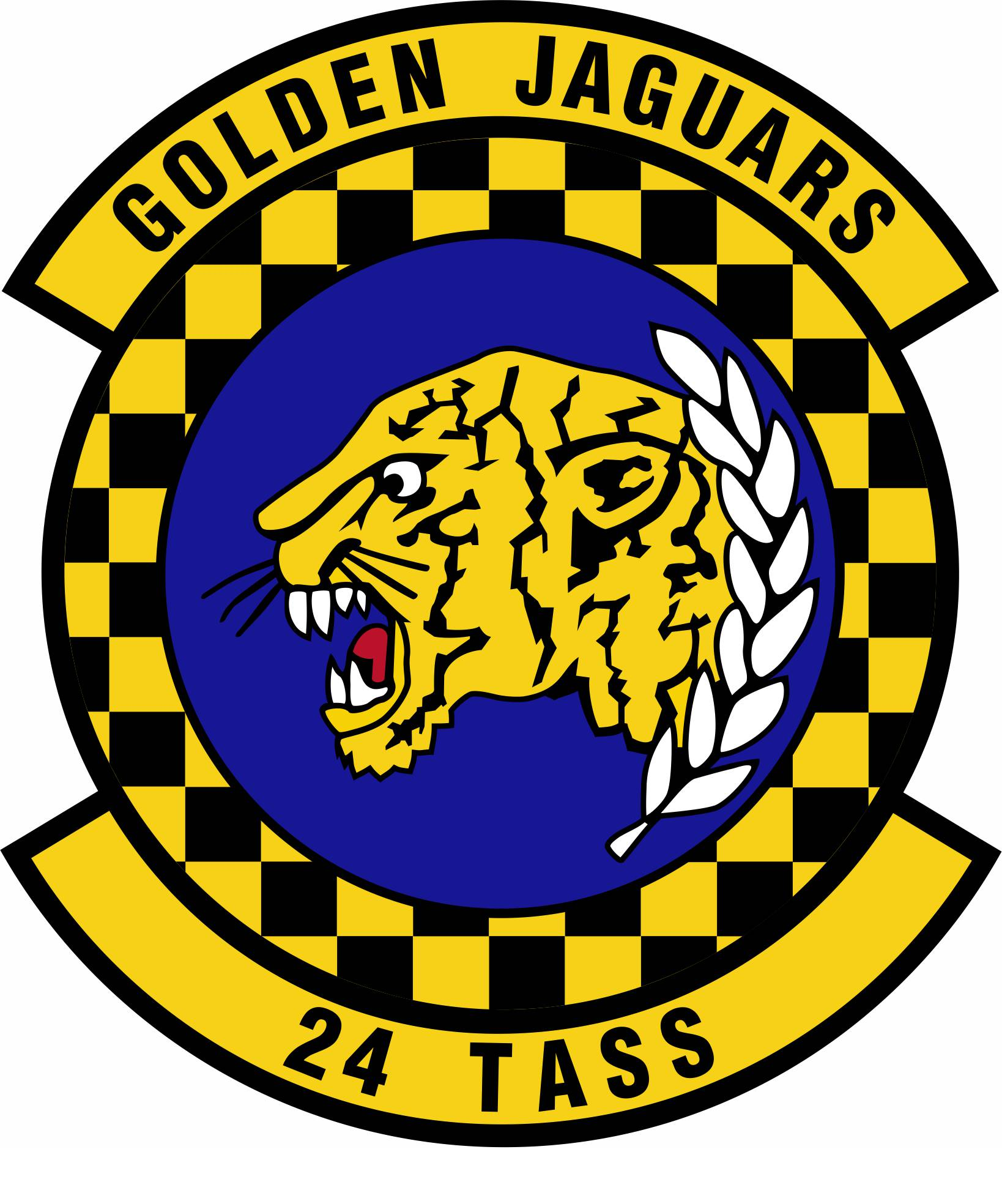
- 24th Helicopter Squadron emblem (Note: Approved 21 June 2018)

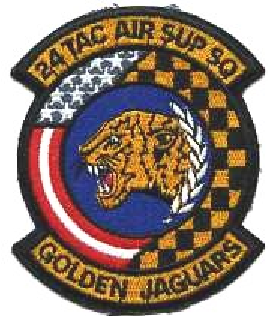
- Patch with 24th Tactical Air Support Squadron emblem (1976–1991)

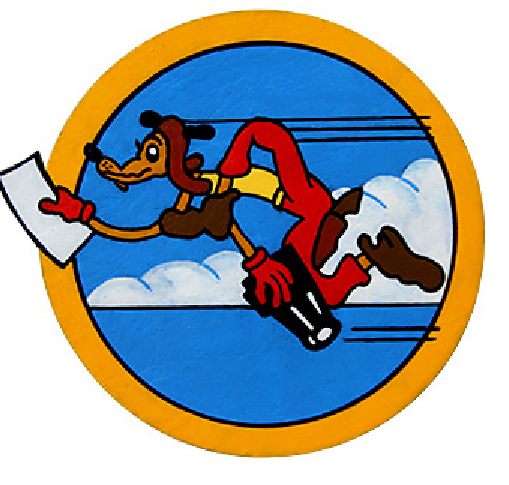
- 24th Combat Mapping Squadron emblem (Note: Approved 2 April 1945. Description: Over and through a medium blue disc, wide border yellow orange, edged black, a caricatured wolf wearing brown aviator's helmet and shoes, yellow sweater, red gloves and trousers, and having brown revolver in holster about waist, running toward dexter, in front of a large, white cloud formation, holding a sheet of white paper in the right hand, pointing a black aerial camera toward base with left forepaw, and leaving black horizontal speed lines to rear.)

The 24th Helicopter Squadron is an active United States Air Force unit, stationed at Maxwell Air Force Base, Alabama. It is a regular air force associate of the reserve 703d Helicopter Squadron, conducting training on the Boeing MH-139 Grey Wolf.

The squadron's first predecessor was organized in 1939 as the 24th Bombardment Squadron. It served as a test organization for light bomber and attack aircraft until it was disbanded in 1942.

Its second predecessor was activated later in 1942 as the 24th Photographic Mapping Squadron. After training in the United States, it deployed to India, operating mapping detachments in India and China. At the end of World War II, it moved to the Philippines, where it was inactivated in 1946. Redesignated the 24th Reconnaissance Squadron, it was activated in the reserve in 1947, but does not appear to have been fully manned or equipped with combat aircraft before inactivating in 1949. It was reactivated in 1951 under Strategic Air Command as the 24th Reconnaissance Squadron. Its mission changed to bombardment the following year, but with two active units both named the 24th Bombardment Squadron, it was inactivated six months later.

The third predecessor of the squadron is the 24th Helicopter Squadron, activated as a light transport unit. It trained in the United States before moving to Japan, where it served until inactivating in 1960. In 1969, it was redesignated the 24th Special Operations Squadron and activated in the Panama Canal Zone. It was redesignated the 24th Composite Squadron in 1971. In 1985, it was consolidated with the other two predecessor units. The squadron participated in Operation Just Cause before inactivating in 1991 as the Air Force reduced its presence in Panama.

From 1987 to 1991 and again from 2018 to 2022 it was active as the 24th Tactical Air Support Squadron.

== Mission ==
The squadron conducts advanced training on the Boeing MH-139 Grey Wolf, focused on complex operational scenarios, including night landings, low-altitude maneuvers and precision targeting.

== History ==
=== World War II ===
==== Proving ground unit ====
The first predecessor of the squadron was the 24th Bombardment Squadron (Light) which was activated in late 1939 as a test unit for light bombardment aircraft at Maxwell Field, Alabama. The squadron was disbanded in the spring of 1942 in a reorganization of United States Army Air Forces operational testing units.

==== Mapping in the Pacific ====
The second predecessor of the squadron was activated in the fall of 1942 as the 24th Photographic Mapping Squadron. After training in the United States under Second Air Force, the squadron deployed to the China Burma India Theater, where it performed combat mapping. mostly with North American B-25 Mitchells and Consolidated B-24 Liberators equipped with vertical and oblique Mapping cameras until moving to Clark Field in the Philippines, where it was inactivated in 1946. In Asia, the squadron deployed detachments to a number of locations, although the headquarters remained in Guskhara Airfield, India.

=== Air Force reserve ===
The squadron was activated again in the reserves in 1947 as the 24th Reconnaissance Squadron, but apparently was not equipped before inactivating when Continental Air Command reorganized under the Wing Base Organization plan in 1949.

=== Strategic Air Command ===
The squadron was activated in the regular Air Force in 1951 as the 24th Strategic Reconnaissance Squadron at Lake Charles Air Force Base, Louisiana and equipped with Boeing RB-29 Superfortresses. When its parent 68th Strategic Reconnaissance Wing converted to a bombardment mission in 1952, the squadron became the 24th Bombardment Squadron, but was inactivated in 1953, and its personnel and equipment were transferred to the 656th Bombardment Squadron, which was simultaneously activated. (Note: SAC found itself with two 24th Bombardment Squadrons when the 24th Strategic Reconnaissance Squadron became a bombardment unit. The 24th Bombardment Squadron, Medium, assigned to the 68th Wing, and the 24th Bombardment Squadron, Heavy at Walker Air Force Base, assigned to the 6th Bombardment Wing. SAC elected to replace the squadron at Chennault. Maurer, Combat Squadrons, pp. 125–127.)

=== Helicopter operations ===
The third predecessor of the squadron was activated in 1956 as the 24th Helicopter Squadron at Sewart Air Force Base, Tennessee. After several months of training the squadron moved to Tachikawa Air Base, Japan, where it served until 1960. The transfer was made on an aircraft carrier of the United States Navy. The unit's mission was to maintain helicopter logistics airlift capability, to perform air land supply operations, scheduled and special airlift operations, and conduct training. Detachment 2 of the squadron was attached to the 41st Air Division to provide logistical support to the division's remote radar sites. In 1958 and 1959 the squadron returned to Burma when it participated in Operation South Bound, which provided assistance to the Burmese Air Force in combatting local insurrectionists.

=== Operations in Central and South America ===
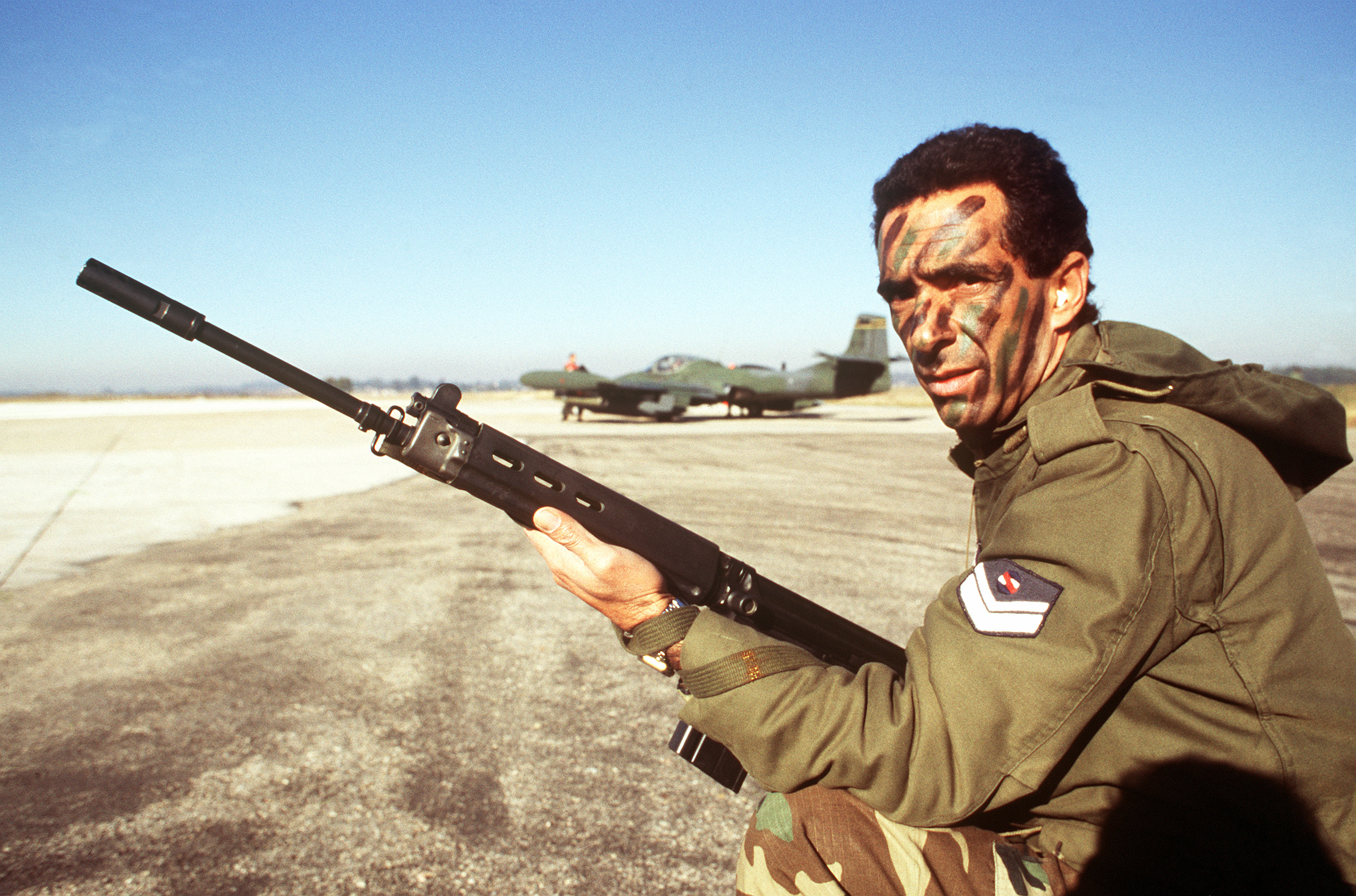
A Uruguayan tactical air controller stands guard over a squadron OA-37 Dragonfly

The squadron was redesignated the 24th Special Operations Squadron and activated in Panama in 1969. In 1985, the squadron was consolidated with its two predecessor units. The consolidated squadron became the 24th Tactical Air Support Squadron in 1987, and was inactivated in the spring of 1991.

=== Close air support training ===
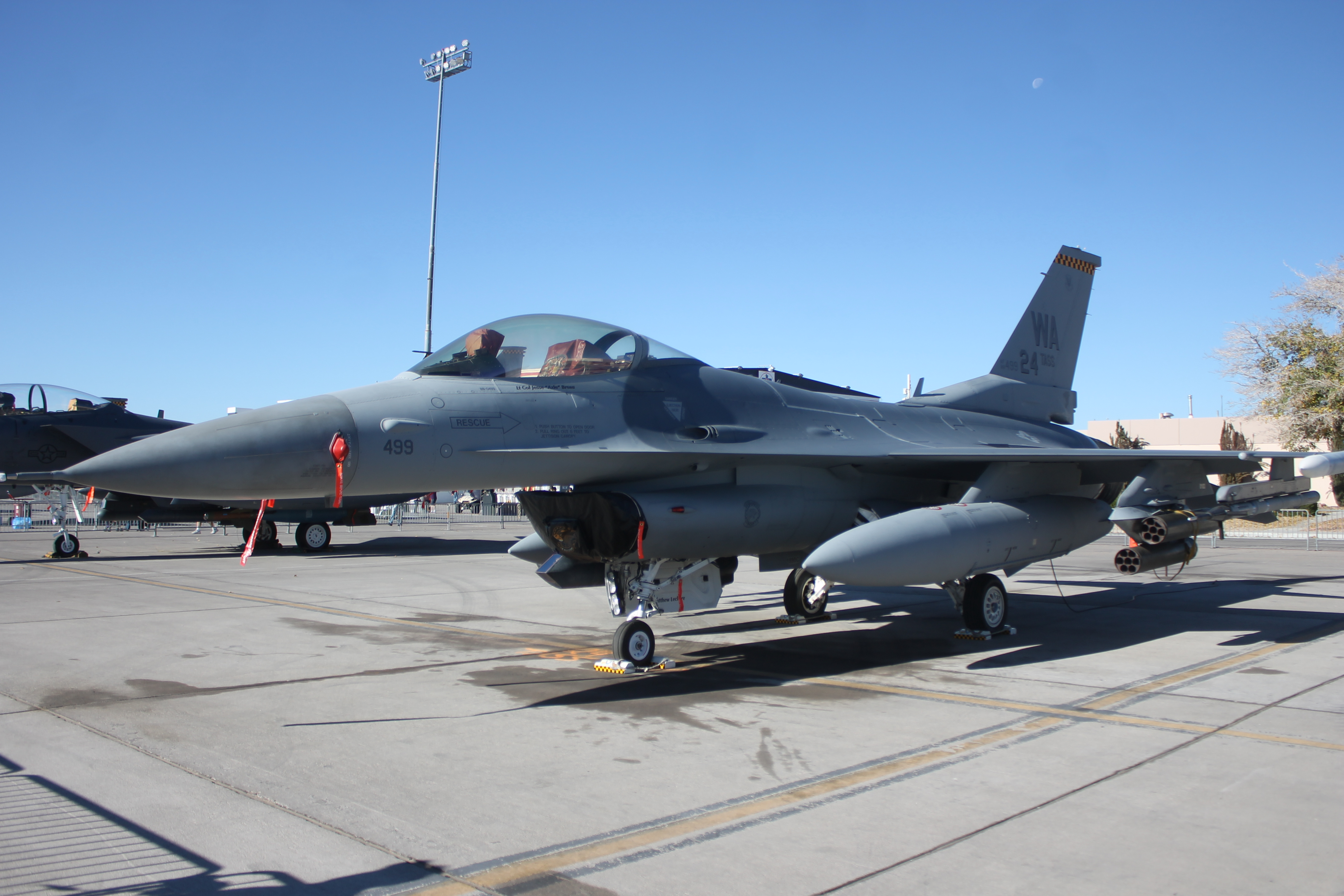
An F-16C Fighting Falcon on display at Aviation Nation 2019 at Nellis Air Force Base.

The squadron was activated on 2 March 2018 at Nellis Air Force Base, Nevada. It was the USAF's Forward Air Controller – Airborne schoolhouse for the General Dynamics F-16 Fighting Falcon as well as supporting the joint terminal attack controller qualification course and Weapons School.

The squadron became non operational in December 2020, which was marked by an "inactivation ceremony" at Nellis. It was inactivated on 1 June 2022.

=== Helicopter training ===
The squadron was redesignated the 24th Helicopter Squadron and activated in December 2024 at Maxwell Air Force Base, Alabama. It is a regular Air Force associate of Air Force Reserve Command's 703d Helicopter Squadron, conducting training on the Boeing MH-139 Grey Wolf helicopter. It is assigned to the 58th Operations Group, stationed at Kirtland Air Force Base, New Mexico. The squadron will train its first cohort of students for the Grey Wolf. They will build on foundational skills learned in basic helicopter courses, refining them into mission-ready capabilities focused on complex operational scenarios, including night landings, low-altitude maneuvers and precision targeting.

== Lineage ==
24th Bombardment Squadron

- Constituted as the 24th Attack-Bombardment Squadron on 1 August 1939

Redesignated 24th Bombardment Squadron (Light) on 28 September 1939
Activated on 1 December 1939
Disbanded on 1 May 1942
Reconstituted on 19 September 1985 and consolidated with 24th Bombardment Squadron, Medium and 24th Composite Squadron as 24th Composite Squadron

24th Strategic Reconnaissance Squadron

- Constituted as the 24th Photographic Mapping Squadron on 14 July 1942

Activated on 2 September 1942
Redesignated as 24th Photographic Squadron, Heavy on 6 February 1943
Redesignated as 24th Combat Mapping Squadron on 11 August 1943
Inactivated on 15 June 1946

- Redesignated 24th Reconnaissance Squadron, Very Long Range, Photographic, Radar Counter-Measures on 13 May 1947

Activated in the reserve on 12 July 1947
Inactivated on 27 June 1949

- Redesignated 24th Strategic Reconnaissance Squadron, Medium, Photographic on 4 October 1951

Activated on 10 October 1951
Redesignated 24th Bombardment Squadron, Medium on 16 June 1952
Redesignated 24th Strategic Reconnaissance Squadron, Medium and inactivated on 16 January 1953

- Consolidated on 19 September 1985 with 24th Bombardment Squadron, (Light) and 24th Composite Squadron as 24th Composite Squadron

24th Helicopter Squadron

- Constituted as the 24th Helicopter Squadron on 24 February 1956

Activated on 9 July 1956
Inactivated on 8 March 1960

- Redesignated 24th Special Operations Squadron on 6 March 1969

Activated on 18 March 1969
Redesignated 24th Composite Squadron on 15 November 1973
Inactivated on 1 July 1975
Activated on 1 January 1976

- Consolidated with 24th Bombardment Squadron, Medium and 24th Bombardment Squadron, Medium on 19 September 1985

Redesignated 24th Tactical Air Support Squadron on 1 January 1987
Inactivated on 31 March 1991

- Activated on 2 March 2018

Inactivated on 1 June 2022

- Redesignated 24th Helicopter Squadron on 23 October 2024

Activated on 6 December 2024

=== Assignments ===
- 23d Composite Group (later Air Corps Proving Ground Detachment, Air Forces Proving Ground Group): 1 December 1939 – 1 May 1942
- 5th Photographic Group (later 5th Photographic Reconnaissance and Mapping Group, 5th Photographic Reconnaissance Group), 2 September 1942
- Third Air Force, 9 October 1943
- III Reconnaissance Command, 12 October 1943
- Army Air Forces, India-Burma Sector, 26 December 1943 (attached to 5306th Photographic and Reconnaissance Group (Provisional), 26 December 1943 – 17 January 1944, Tenth Air Force)
- Tenth Air Force, 7 March 1944
- 8th Photographic Reconnaissance Group (later 8th Reconnaissance Group), 25 April 1944
- Army Air Forces, India-Burma Theater, 20 September 1945
- Thirteenth Air Force, 28 January 1946
- 313th Bombardment Wing, 1 April 1946 − 15 June 1946
- 68th Reconnaissance Group, 12 July 1947 − 27 June 1949
- 68th Strategic Reconnaissance Group, 10 October 1951 (attached to 68th Strategic Reconnaissance Wing)
- 68th Bombardment Wing, 16 June 1952 − 16 January 1953
- Eighteenth Air Force, 9 July 1956
- 315th Air Division: 13 October 1956 − 8 March 1960
- 24th Special Operations Wing (later 24th Special Operations Group, 24th Composite Group), 18 March 1969 − 1 July 1975
- 24th Composite Wing, 1 January 1976
- USAF Southern Air Division, 31 January 1987
- 24th Composite Wing, 1 January 1989
- Air Forces Panama, 15 February − 31 March 1991
- 57th Operations Group, 2 March 2018 – 1 June 2022
- 58th Operations Group, 6 December 2024 – present

=== Stations ===
- Maxwell Field, Alabama, 1 December 1939
- Orlando Army Air Base, Florida, 2 September 1940
- Eglin Field, Florida 29 June 1941 − 1 May 1942
- Peterson Field, Colorado, 2 September 1942
- Will Rogers Field, Oklahoma, 13 October 1943
- Camp Anza, California, 8 November 1943 − 18 November 1943
- Guskhara, India, 5 January 1944
- Calcutta, India, 23 December 1945
- Kanchrapara, India, 17 December 1945 − 17 January 1946 (air echelon moved to Clark Field on 18 December)
- Clark Field, Luzon, Philippines, 29 January 1946 − 15 June 1946
- Hamilton Field (later Hamilton Air Force Base), California, 12 July 1947 − 27 June 1949
- Lake Charles Air Force Base, Louisiana, 10 October 1951 − 16 January 1953
- Sewart Air Force Base, Tennessee, 9 July – 25 September 1956
- Itami Air Base, Japan, 10 October 1956
- Showa Air Station, Japan, 1 July 1957 − 8 March 1960
- Howard Air Force Base, 18 March 1969 − 1 July 1975
- Howard Air Force Base (later Howard Air Base), 1 January 1976 − 31 March 1991
- Nellis Air Force Base, 2 March 2018 – 1 June 2022
- Maxwell Air Force Base, Alabama, 6 December 2024 – present

==== Detachment Locations during World War II ====
- Hsinching Airfield, China, 17 March 1944 – 9 April 1944, 27 April 1944 − c. 1 July 1944, October–November 1944
- Jorhat Airfield, India, 9 April 1944 – 22 April 1944
- Liuchow Airfield, China, 10 July 1944 – 22 September 1944
- Chanyi Airfield, China, 22 September 1944 – 17 February 1945
- Pengshan Airfield, China, November 1944
- Tulihal and Cox's Bazar, India, February 1945 − c. April 1945

=== Aircraft ===
- Curtiss A-12 Shrike:1940–1942
- Curtiss A-18 Shrike: 1940–1942
- Douglas A-20 Havoc: 1940–1942
- Stearman XA-21: 1940–1942
- Martin B-10: 1940–1942
- Martin B-12: 1940–1942
- Douglas B-18 Bolo:1940–1942
- Douglas B-23 Dragon: 1940–1942
- Consolidated B-24 Liberator(F-7): 1943, 1944–1946
- North American B-25 Mitchell (F-9): 1940–1942, 1944
- Boeing RB-29 Superfortress (F-13): 1946; 1952–1953
- Lockheed C-36 Electra: 1940–1942
- Lockheed C-40 Electra: 1940–1942
- Bell YFM-1 Airacuda: 1940–1942
- Consolidated PB-2: 1940–1942
- Stearman PT-17 Kaydet: 1940–1942
- Douglas SBD-1 Dauntless: 1940–1942
- Piasecki H-21: 1956–unknown
- General Dynamics F-16 Fighting Falcon: 2018–2020
- Boeing MH-139 Grey Wolf: 2024–present

=== Awards and campaigns ===
Award streamer	Award	Dates	Notes
	Air Force Outstanding Unit Award	1 January 1957 – 1 August 1958	24th Helicopter Squadron
	Air Force Outstanding Unit Award	18 March 1969 – 13 April 1970	24th Special Operations Squadron
	Air Force Outstanding Unit Award	2 June 1970 – 3 July 1970	24th Special Operations Squadron
	Air Force Outstanding Unit Award	16 March 1971 – 15 March 1973	24th Special Operations Squadron
	Air Force Outstanding Unit Award	1 July 1976 – 30 June 1978	24th Composite Squadron
	Air Force Outstanding Unit Award	1 April 1982 – 31 March 1984	24th Composite Squadron
	Air Force Outstanding Unit Award	20 December 1989 – 14 February 1991	24th Tactical Air Support Squadron

Campaign Streamer	Campaign	Dates	Notes
	India-Burma	5 January 1944 – 28 January 1945	24th Combat Mapping Squadron
	Central Burma	29 January 1945 – 15 July 1945	24th Combat Mapping Squadron
	China Defensive	5 January 1944 – 4 May 1945	24th Combat Mapping Squadron
	Just Cause	20 December 1989–31 January 1990	24th Tactical Air Support Squadron, Panama
