= Violations of Japanese airspace =

Violations of Japanese airspace have occurred on a number of occasions. There have been 39 cases from 1967 to 2017. The vast majority have involved Soviet aircraft during the Cold War, or Russian aircraft afterwards.

There have been several prominent cases of airspace violations.

- Viktor Belenko MiG-25 defection (September 6, 1976)
- Soviet Tu-16 violation of airspace over Okinawa (December 9, 1987)

In addition to actual violations there are many cases of foreign aircraft skirting Japanese airspace. In 2016 fighter squadrons of the Japan Air Self-Defense Force (JASDF) aircraft launched 851 times to intercept Chinese aircraft and 301 times in response to Russian aircraft.

== List of airspace violations ==
| Number | Date | Location | Country | Aircraft type (number) |
|---|---|---|---|---|
| 1 | August 19, 1967 | Rebun Island, Hokkaido | USSR | Unknown (1) |
| 2 | February 7, 1974 | Rebun Island, Hokkaido | USSR | Unknown (1) |
| 3 | September 24, 1975 | Shikine-jima/Kōzu-shima, Tokyo | USSR | Tu-95 (2) |
| 4 | September 6, 1976 | Hokkaido | USSR | MiG-25 (1) |
| 5 | September 7, 1977 | Gotō Islands, Nagasaki | USSR | Tu-95 (2) |
| 6 | March 17, 1978 | Tsushima Island, Nagasaki | USSR | Tu-95 (1) |
| 7 | December 5, 1978 | Rebun Island, Hokkaido | USSR | Unknown (1) |
| 8 | November 15, 1979 | Senkaku Islands, Okinawa | USSR | Tu-95 (2) |
| 9 | June 29, 1980 | Hegura-jima, Ishikawa | USSR | Ilyushin Il-38 (2) |
| 10 | August 18, 1980 | Gotō Islands, Nagasaki | USSR | Ilyushin Il-62 (1) |
| 11 | June 6, 1981 | Rebun Island, Hokkaido | USSR | Ilyushin Il-14 (1) |
| 12 | June 24, 1981 | Rebun Island, Hokkaido | USSR | Unknown (1) |
| 13 | April 3, 1981 | Danjogun, Nagasaki | USSR | Il-62 (1) |
| 14 | October 15, 1983 | Shiretoko, Hokkaido | USSR | MiG-23? (2?) |
| 15 | November 15, 1982 | Okinoshima, Fukuoka | USSR | Tu-16 (1), Tu-95 (1) |
| 16 | November 12, 1983 | Okinoshima, Fukuoka | USSR | Tu-16 (1) |
| 17 | November 23, 1983 | Okinoshima, Fukuoka | USSR | Tu-95 (1), Tu-142 (1) |
| 18 | February 6, 1986 | Rebun Island, Hokkaido | USSR | Unknown (1) |
| 19 | August 27, 1987 | Rebun Island, Hokkaido | USSR | Unknown (1) |
| 20 | December 9, 1987 | Okinawa | USSR | Tu-16 (1) |
| 21 | April 21, 1989 | Rebun Island, Hokkaido | USSR | Unknown (1) |
| 22 | July 6, 1991 | Nemuro Peninsula, Hokkaido | USSR | An-30 |
| 23 | August 15, 1991 | Rebun Island, Hokkaido | USSR | Tu-95 (2) |
| 24 | April 10, 1992 | Rebun Island/Wakkanai, Hokkaido | Russia | An-12 |
| 25 | May 7, 1992 | Sea near Hokkaido | Russia | Unknown (1) |
| 26 | July 28, 1992 | Tsushima Island, Nagasaki | Russia | Tu-154 (2) |
| 27 | August 31, 1993 | Kukujima, Aomori Prefecture | Russia | Il-20 (1) |
| 28 | March 25, 1994 | Senkaku Islands, Okinawa | Taiwan | Beechcraft King Air B350 |
| 29 | March 23, 1995 | Rebun Island, Hokkaido | Russia | MiG-31 |
| 30 | February 14, 2001 | Rebun Island, Hokkaido | Russia | Tu-22M (2), Tu-22(?) (2) |
| 31 | April 11, 2001 | Rebun Island, Hokkaido | Russia | Unknown (1) |
| 32 | April 11, 2001 | Kukujima, Aomori Prefecture | Russia | Su-24 |
| 33 | January 25, 2005 | Rebun Island, Hokkaido | Russia | An-72 |
| 34 | February 9, 2008 | Izu Islands/Lot's Wife (crag), Tokyo | Russia | Tu-95 (1) |
| 35 | December 13, 2012 | Uotsurishima, Okinawa | China | Y-12 (1) |
| 36 | February 7, 2013 | Rishiri Island, Hokkaido | Russia | Su-27 (2) |
| 37 | August 22, 2013 | Okinoshima, Fukuoka | Russia | Tu-95 (2) |
| 38 | September 15, 2015 | Nemuro Peninsula, Hokkaido | Russia? | Fisheries monitoring? |
| 39 | May 18, 2017 | Senkaku Islands, Okinawa | China | Unmanned Aerial Vehicle |

== See also ==
- Tokyo Express (flights)
