= 1876th Communications Squadron =

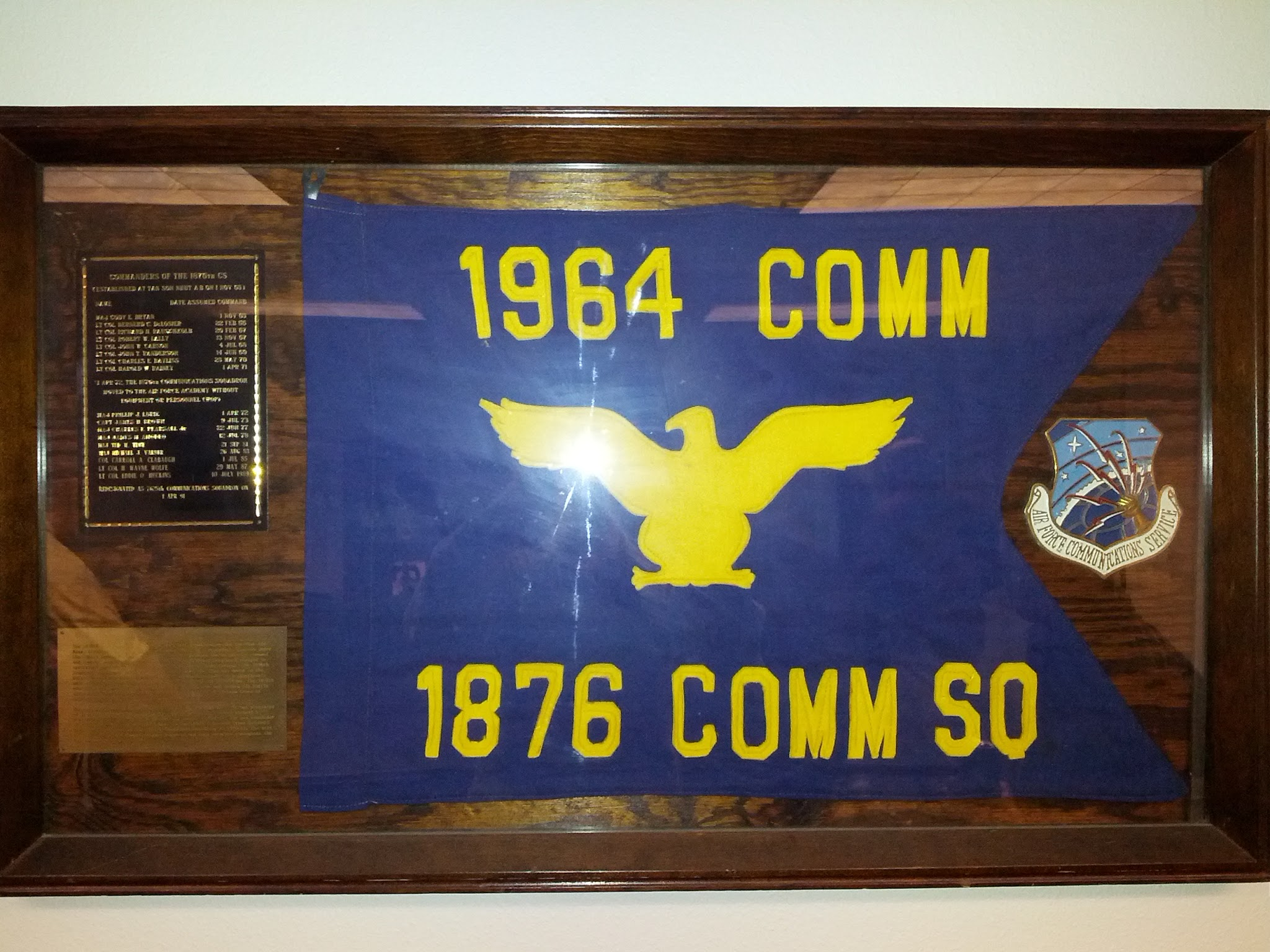
Squadron guidon that was used during the Vietnam war, now in the conference room of the 10th Communications Squadron

The 1876th Communications Squadron was a unit of the United States Air Force that performed communications functions in the Republic of Vietnam from 1965 to 1972 during the Vietnam War and then at the United States Air Force Academy from April 1972, where it was upgraded to a group in 1995. It has been inactive since the early 1990s when USAF organizational changes had it replaced by an org with an older lineage.

== History ==
The squadron was first organized at Tan Son Nhut Air Base, Republic of Vietnam, on 1 November 1965, as a dependent squadron under the 1964th Communications Group (AFCS). Its mission was to provide command and control communications for United States military personnel engaged in operations against Viet Cong and North Vietnamese enemy forces. While in Vietnam, the 1876th was presented seven Air Force Outstanding Unit Awards and earned six battle streamers. The 1876th was also awarded the Republic of Vietnam Cross of Gallantry with Palm.

The 1876th remained in Vietnam until 29 February 1972 when the flag was moved to the unit of the Northern Communications Area (NCA) of the Air Force Communications Service (AFCS).

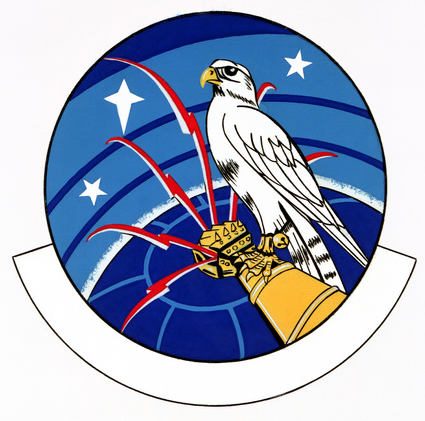
Emblem of the 1876th Comm Squadron

On 1 April 1972, the 1959th Communications Squadron, stationed at the United States Air Force Academy, was inactivated. On the same day, the 1876 CS relocated without equipment or personnel to USAFA as part of the United States forces withdrawal from Southeast Asia. 1876 CS assumed the duties and responsibilities of 1959 CS. As a squadron belonging to Air Force Communications Service, and later Air Force Communications Command (AFCC), the 1876th was a tenant unit at the USAF Academy.

On 1 July 1985, with the integration of the USAFA Computer Resources Organization, the squadron was redesignated as the 1876th Information Systems Support Group (ISSG) by Headquarters AFCC.

On 1 November 1986, the 1876th ISSG was redesignated as the 1876th Communications Group. 1876 CG provided communications, computer, and air traffic services support; developed and maintained software; and managed, operated, and maintained equipment and facilities to include telecommunications center, telephone switchboard, and educational television.

In 1991 Air Force Communications Command was losing its long list of units it had gathered over the years, the units now reporting to the groups, wings, or major commands for which they worked. On 1 April 1991, the 1876th was redesignated the 7625th Communications Squadron, the organization now reporting instead to the USAF Academy organization. Three months later, having shed the many units it had gathered over the years, the status of Air Force Communications Command changed from a major command to a field operating agency.

Circa 16 January 1993 the 7625th Communications Squadron was again redesignated for a short time as the 54th Communications Squadron before the current the 10th Communications Squadron was reactivated on 1 November 1994 at USAFA to take over communications support duties under the newly reactivated 10th Air Base Wing.

== Awards and decorations ==
- seven Air Force Outstanding Unit Awards:
  - with Valor 1 July 1969 - 30 June 1970
  - with Valor 1 July 1970 - 30 June 1971
  - with Valor 1 July 1971 - 1 April 1972

- six Vietnam War battle streamers

- Republic of Vietnam Cross of Gallantry with Palm, 1 April 1966 - 1 April 1972

== Commanders with date assumed command ==
- Maj Code E. Bryan, 1 Nov 1965
- Lt Col Bernerd C. DeLosier, 22 Feb 1966
- Lt Col Richard H. Rauschkole, 20 Feb 1967
- Lt Col Robert W. Lally, 13 Nov 1967
- Lt Col John W. Carson, 4 Jul 1968
- Lt Col John T. Randerson, 14 Jun 1969
- Lt Col Charles E. Bayliss, 25 May 1970
- Lt Col Harold W. Rainey, 1 Apr 1971

1 April 1972, the unit moved to the USAF Academy without equipment or personnel.

- Maj Phillip J. Lubie, 1 Apr 1972
- Capt James H. Brown, 9 Jul 1973
- Maj Charles E. Pearsall, Jr., 22 Jun 1977
- Maj James M. Amodeo, 12 Jul 1978
- Maj Michael J. Varner, 26 Aug 1983
- Col Carroll A. Clabaugh, 1 Jul 1985
- Lt Col H. Wayne Wolfe, 29 May 1987
- Lt Col Eddie O. Huckins, 10 Jul 1989
