= Viet Cong attack on Tan Son Nhut Air Base (1966) =

Part of the Vietnam War (1966)

- Part of the Vietnam War
Date	4–5 December 1966
Location	Tan Son Nhut Air Base, South Vietnam
Result	United States and South Vietnam victory

Belligerents
South Vietnam; United States	Viet Cong

Commanders and leaders
(United States) Colonel Grover Coe	Lê Minh Xuân; Bành Văn Trân (Năm Vững); Nguyễn Văn Kịp (Đồng Đen)

Units involved
377th Air Police Squadron; 120th Assault Helicopter Battalion; 53rd Regional Force Battalion	Special Forces Unit F100

Casualties and losses
(United States) 3 killed (South Vietnam) 3 killed 20 aircraft damaged and 3 vehicles destroyed VC claims: 600+ US and ARVN killed or wounded 260 airplanes, 1 depot with 300 tons of bombs and 13 military vehicles destroyed	28 killed 4 captured

A Viet Cong (VC) attack on Tan Son Nhut Air Base occurred during the early hours of 4 December 1966, during the Vietnam War. Tan Son Nhut Air Base was one of the major air bases used for offensive air operations within South Vietnam and for the support of United States Army and Army of the Republic of Vietnam (ARVN) ground operations. The attack by VC sappers, supported by mortar fire, was repulsed by the United States Air Force (USAF) base security forces by 04:00, though VC stragglers continued to be engaged in and around the base until 5 December.

== Prelude ==
After receiving intelligence that over 5,000 American troops and tons of weapon would land at Tan Son Nhut Air Base in order to prepare for Operation Cedar Falls, elements of the Viet Cong Special Forces Unit F100 led by Lê Minh Xuân left its camp at Bình Chánh, suburb of Saigon. The VC special forces also had support from others VC troops outside the base for logistic and preventing reinforcement of ARVN and the USAF base security forces.

== Battle ==
The VC force led by Nguyễn Văn Kịp (Đồng Đen) penetrated the base perimeter fence at approximately 01:00 on 4 December. The penetration was detected by a USAF sentry dog team at guardpost Alpha K-19 (10.828°N 106.658°E) north of the 07/25 runway and he raised the alarm. A USAF security patrol was deployed to guardpost and the VC began their attack shortly after this. An 8–9 man group of VC was engaged by guardpost 15 near Taxiway W-7. Another group of VC crossed the 07/25 runway and attempted to attack the aircraft parking area but were stopped by machine gun fire from bunker Delta 11 which killed 13 VC.

Another group of VC entered the C-47 and helicopter parking area. The VC fired and threw hand grenades into the aircraft parking area before withdrawing at 01:40. A power unit next to an aircraft revetment exploded after being hit by a grenade and the resulting fire damaged an RF-101C aircraft.

VC mortar fire from outside the base was detected by counter-mortar radar and the mortar site was targeted by ARVN 105mm artillery, Vietnam Air Force A-1s and helicopters from the US Army 120th Assault Helicopter Battalion. Elements of the ARVN 53rd Regional Force Battalion were ambushed as they approached the mortar site, suffering two killed but they overran the mortar position by 02:15 suffering a further one killed.

As some VC withdrew at approximately 01:40, the USAF security police moved to block their escape. At 02:10 the retreating VC engaged the USAF line in a firefight that lasted until 02:35. Two USAF security police were killed in this engagement and two wounded, while three VC were killed.

At 02:30 a VC satchel charge exploded in the old bomb dump area in the north-central area of the base, detonating a store of US Navy 5 inch shells.

At 03:05 a USAF guard at post Alpha K-20 reported that the VC were attacking his position. At 03:50 a sentry dog unit at Alpha K-21 pursued retreating VC and at 04:15 Alpha K-20 was secured but the USAF security policemen at that post had been killed.

At 04:00 the base security forces were put on hold and at 04:45 a full search of the based was conducted. At 06:25 as the sun rose, VC were spotted on the road outside the base perimeter near the penetration point and were engaged by USAF security police, the VC returned fire and two VC were killed, one USAF wounded and two VC captured. A further two VC were captured near the west of runway 07/25. At 08:10 US forces mounted a search and destroy operation on the west perimeter of the air base until 09:20.

The air base resumed normal flight operations at 08:49.

At 20:21 Alpha Post K-34 detected VC and a quick reaction team was despatched to the scene. At 21:00 a search operation commenced and at 21:45 two VC were killed in the area, a further two VC were killed later. At 22:45 to the south of the position another VC was located and killed. At 00:29 on 5 December a sentry dog team from A-34 detected VC and was soon engaged by three VC, the dog handler was shot and wounded, a quick reaction team arrived and the VC were killed with grenades. It was later determined that the VC were part of the original attack force who had been attempting to escape through the original entry point.

At 11:53 on 5 December, a VC was observed in the old bomb dump area and he was engaged and killed.

== Aftermath ==
The Viet Cong claim that they withdrew having destroyed 260 airplanes, a depot of bombs and shells, 13 military vehicles and having killed or wounded over 600 US and ARVN soldiers.

The US suffered three USAF personnel killed and 15 wounded while the ARVN suffered three killed and four wounded. The US/ARVN killed 28 Viet Cong and captured four. 17 aircraft suffered minor to moderate damage, three aircraft suffered major damage and three USAF vehicles were destroyed. The US considered the engagement as a victory as they had repulsed the attack with minimal losses.
