= Tan Son Nhut Air Base =

Airbase in Vietnam

Tan Son Nhut Air Base
- Part of Republic of Vietnam Air Force (RVNAF); Pacific Air Forces (USAF); Vietnam Air Defence - Air Force (VN ADAF)
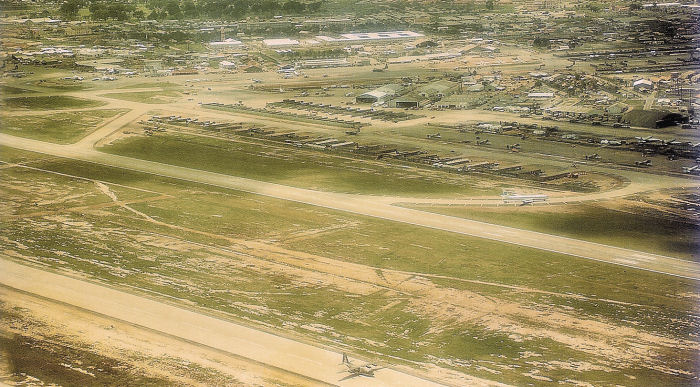
- Tan Son Nhut Air Base – June 1968

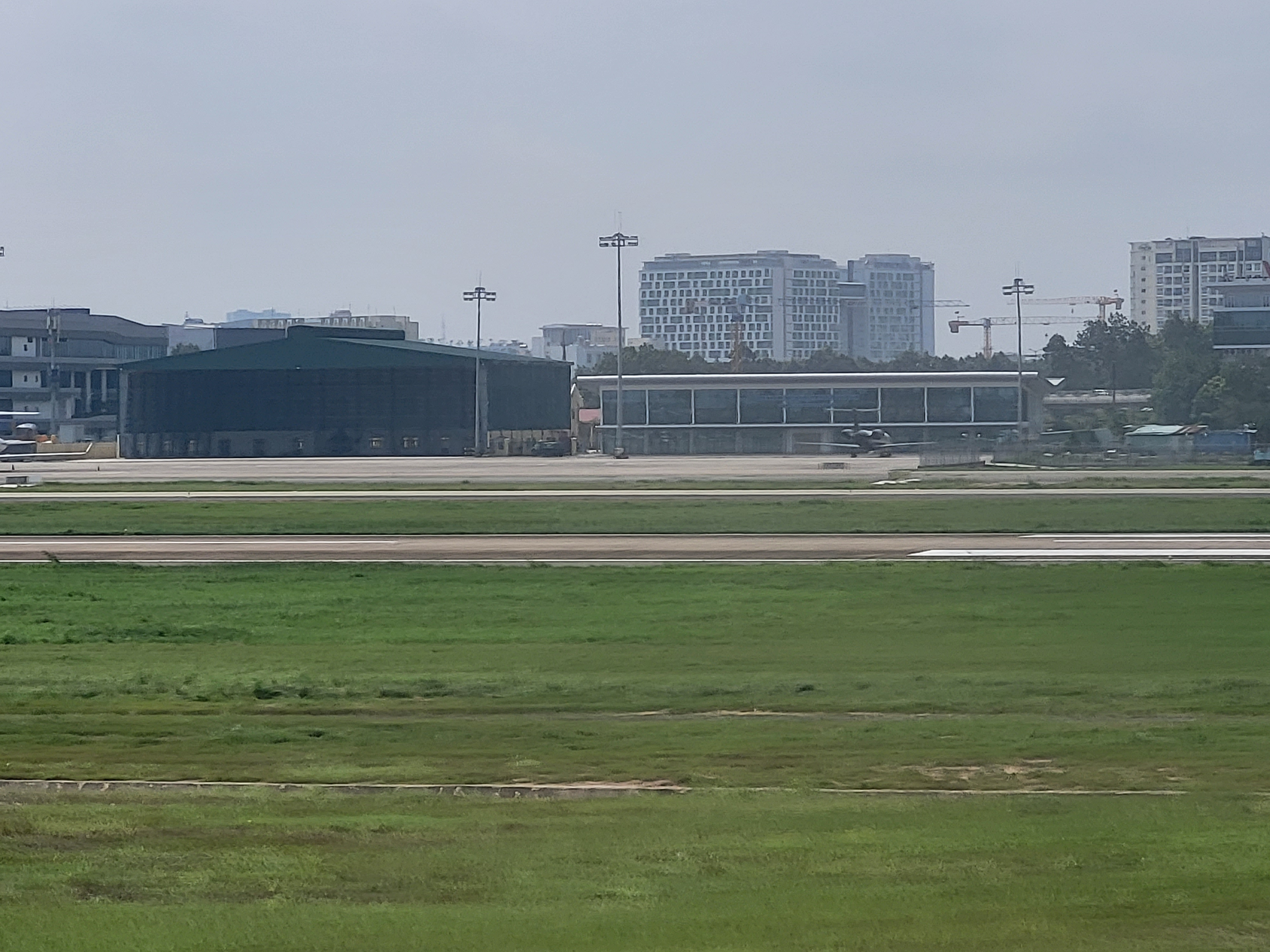
- The modern military terminal as constructed and operated by the Vietnam Air Defence - Air Force

Site information
- Type: Air Force Base
- Condition: Joint Civil/Military Airport

Location
- Location of Tan Son Nhut Air Base in Vietnam
- Location within Vietnam
- Coordinates: 10°49′08″N 106°39′07″E

Site history
- Built: 1955
- In use: 1955–present
- Battles/wars: Vietnam War

Tan Son Nhat International Airport
- IATA: SGN; ICAO: VVTS

Summary
- Elevation AMSL: 10 m (33 ft)
- Interactive map of Tan Son Nhat International Airport

Runways
Direction	Length		Surface
Direction	m	ft	Surface
07L/25R	3,048	10,000	Concrete
07R/25L	3,800	12,468	Concrete

Tan Son Nhut Air Base (Vietnamese: Căn cứ không quân Tân Sơn Nhứt) is a former Republic of Vietnam Air Force (RVNAF) facility located near the city of Saigon in southern Vietnam. The United States used it as a major base during the Vietnam War (1959–1975), stationing Army, Air Force, Navy, and Marine units there. Following the Fall of Saigon, it was taken over as a Vietnam People's Air Force (VPAF) facility and remains in use today.

Tan Son Nhat International Airport (IATA: SGN, ICAO: VVTS) has been a major Vietnamese civil airport since the 1920s. Over time the Vietnam Air Defence - Air Force's military activities at the airport have been gradually reduced due to the airport's proximity to downtown Ho Chi Minh City, as well as military lands having been converted and utilized for civilian facilities and developments.

== Early history ==
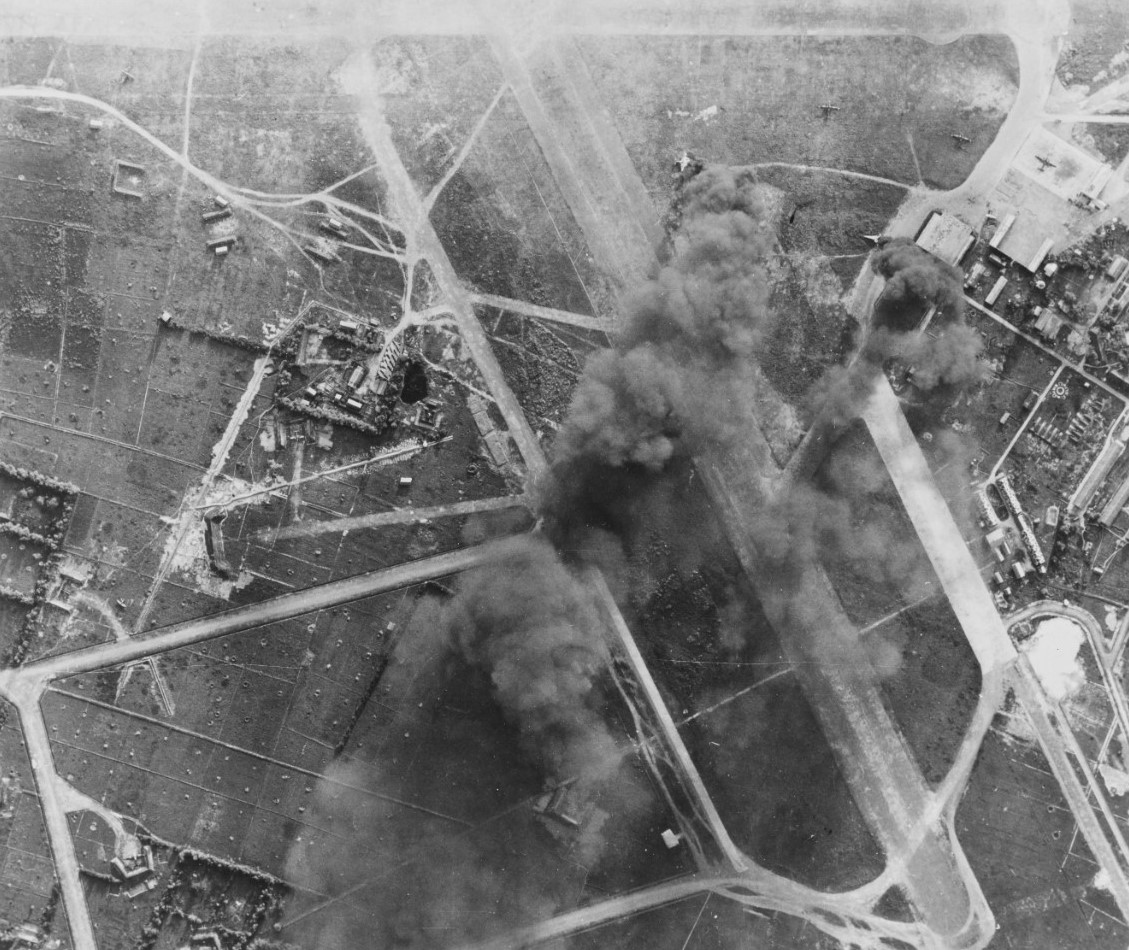
File:Tan Son Nhut airfield under attack by U.S. Navy aircraft, 12 January 1945

Tan Son Nhat Airport was built by the French in the 1930s when the French Colonial government of Indochina constructed a small unpaved airport, known as Tan Son Nhat Airfield, in the village of Tan Son Nhat to serve as Saigon's commercial airport. Flights to and from France, as well as within Southeast Asia were available prior to World War II. During World War II, the Imperial Japanese Army used Tan Son Nhat as a transport base. When Japan surrendered in August 1945, the French Air Force flew a contingent of 150 troops into Tan Son Nhat.

After World War II, Tân Sơn Nhất served domestic as well as international flights from Saigon.

In mid-1956 construction of a 7,200-foot (2,200 m) runway was completed and the International Cooperation Administration soon started work on a 10,000-foot (3,000 m) concrete runway. The airfield was run by the South Vietnamese Department of Civil Aviation with the RVNAF as a tenant located on the southwest of the airfield.

In 1961, the government of South Vietnam requested the U.S. Military Assistance Advisory Group (MAAG) to plan for expansion of the Tan Son Nhut airport. A taxiway parallel to the original runway had just been completed by the E.V. Lane company for the U.S. Operations Mission, but parking aprons and connections to the taxiways were required. Under the direction of the U.S. Navy Officer in Charge of Construction RVN, these items were constructed by the American construction company RMK-BRJ in 1962. RMK-BRJ also constructed an air-control radar station in 1962, and the passenger and freight terminals in 1963. In 1967, RMK-BRJ constructed the second 10,000-foot concrete runway.

== Republic of Vietnam Air Force use ==
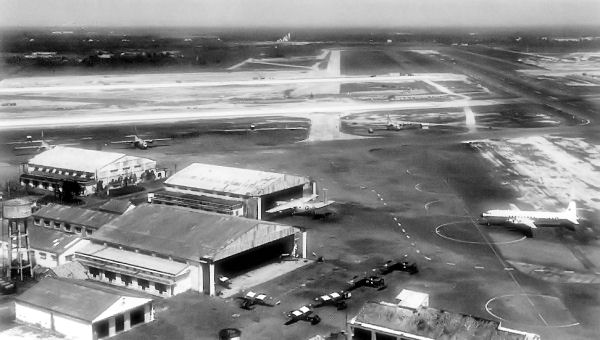
Tan Son Nhut Air Base in 1962. The uncrowded flight line reflects the level of USAF/RVNAF activity

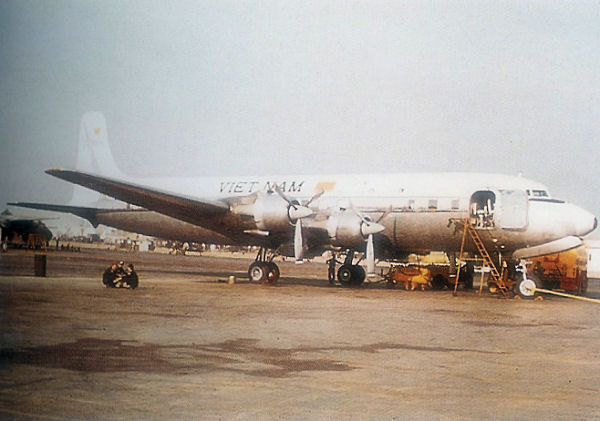
Douglas DC-6B VIP Transport of the RVNAF 314th Special Missions Squadron

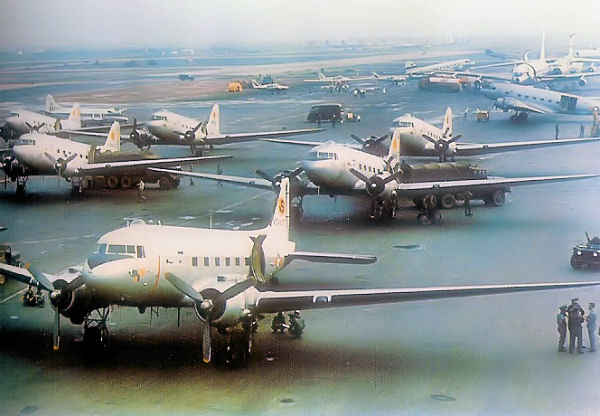
RVNAF C-47 Skytrains of the 413th Transportation Squadron on the crowded flightline at Tan Son Nhut in 1966 along with a Royal Air Force De Havilland Dove, a USAF Lockheed C-141 Starlifter, and several other aircraft

In late 1951, the French Air Force established the RVNAF 312th Special Mission Squadron at Tan Son Nhat Airfield equipped with Morane 500 Criquet liaison aircraft.

In 1952 a heliport was constructed at the base for use by French Air Force medical evacuation helicopters.

In 1953, Tan Son Nhut started being used as a military air base for the fledgling RVNAF, and in 1956 the headquarters were moved from the center of Saigon to Tan Son Nhut. But even before that time, French and Vietnamese military aircraft were in evidence at Tan Son Nhut.

On 1 July 1955, the RVNAF 1st Transport Squadron equipped with C-47 Skytrains was established at the base. The RVNAF also had a special missions squadron at the base equipped with 3 C-47s, 3 C-45s and 1 L-26. The 1st Transport Squadron would be renamed the 413th Air Transport Squadron in January 1963.

In June 1956 the 2nd Transport Squadron equipped with C-47s was established at the base and the RVNAF established its headquarters there. It would be renamed the 415th Air Transport Squadron in January 1963.

In November 1956, by agreement with the South Vietnamese government, the USAF assumed some training and administrative roles of the RVNAF. A full handover of training responsibility took place on 1 June 1957 when the French training contracts expired.

On 1 June 1957 the RVNAF 1st Helicopter Squadron was established at the base without equipment. It operated with the French Air Force unit serving the International Control Commission and in April 1958 with the departure of the French it inherited its 10 H-19 helicopters.

In October 1959 the 2nd Liaison Squadron equipped with L-19 Bird Dogs moved to the base from Nha Trang.

In mid-December 1961 the USAF began delivery of 30 T-28 Trojans to the RVNAF at Tan Son Nhut.

In December 1962 the 293rd Helicopter Squadron was activated at the base, it was inactivated in August 1964.

In late 1962 the RVNAF formed the 716th Composite Reconnaissance Squadron initially equipped with 2 C-45 photo-reconnaissance aircraft.

In January 1963 the USAF opened an H-19 pilot training facility at the base and by June the first RVNAF helicopter pilots had graduated.

In January 1963 the 211th Helicopter Squadron equipped with UH-34s replaced the 1st Helicopter Squadron.

In December 1963 the 716th Composite Reconnaissance Squadron was activated at the base, equipped with C-47s and T-28s. The squadron would be inactivated in June 1964 and its mission assumed by the 2nd Air Division, while its pilots formed the 520th Fighter Squadron at Bien Hoa Air Base.

In January 1964 all RVNAF units at the base came under the control of the newly established 33rd Tactical Wing.

By midyear, the RVNAF had grown to thirteen squadrons; four fighter, four observation, three helicopter, and two C-47 transport. The RVNAF followed the practice of the U.S. Air Force, organizing the squadrons into wings, with one wing located in each of the four corps tactical zones at Cần Thơ Air Base, Tan Son Nhut AB, Pleiku Air Base and Da Nang Air Base.

In May 1965 the Douglas A-1 Skyraider equipped 522nd Fighter Squadron was activated at the base.

=== Command and control center ===
As the headquarters for the RVNAF, Tan Son Nhut was primarily a command base, with most operational units using nearby Biên Hòa Air Base.

At Tan Son Nhut, the RVNAF's system of command and control was developed over the years with assistance from the USAF. The system handled the flow of aircraft from take-off to target area, and return to the base it was launched from. This was known as the Tactical Air Control System (TACS), and it assured positive control of all areas where significant combat operations were performed. Without this system, it would not have been possible for the RVNAF to deploy its forces effectively where needed.

The TACS was in close proximity to the headquarters of the RVNAF and USAF forces in South Vietnam, and commanders of both Air Forces utilized its facilities. Subordinate to TACS was the Direct Air Support Centers (DASC) assigned to each of corps areas (I DASC – Da Nang AB, DASC Alpha – Nha Trang Air Base, II DASC – Pleiku AB, III DASC – Bien Hoa AB, and IV DASC – Cần Thơ AB). DASCs were responsible for the deployment of aircraft located within their sector in support of ground operations.

Operating under each DASC were numerous Tactical Air Control Party (TACPs), manned by one or more RVNAF/USAF personnel posted with the South Vietnamese Army (ARVN) ground forces. A communications network inked these three levels of command and control, giving the TACS overall control of the South Vietnamese air situation at all times.

Additional information was provided by a radar network that covered all of South Vietnam and beyond, monitoring all strike aircraft.

Another function of Tan Son Nhut Air Base was as an RVNAF recruiting center.

=== Use in coups ===
The base was adjacent to the headquarters of the Joint General Staff of South Vietnam, and was a key venue in various military coups, particularly the 1963 coup that deposed the nation's first President Ngô Đình Diệm. The plotters invited loyalist officers to a routine lunch meeting at JGS and captured them in the afternoon of 1 November 1963. The most notable was Colonel Lê Quang Tung, loyalist commander of the ARVN Special Forces, which was effectively a private Ngô family army, and his brother and deputy, Le Quang Trịeu. Later, Captain Nguyễn Văn Nhung, bodyguard of coup leader General Dương Văn Minh, shot the brothers on the edge of the base.

On 14 April 1966 a Viet Cong (VC) mortar attack on the base destroyed two RVNAF aircraft and killed seven USAF and two RVNAF personnel.

The base was attacked by the VC in a sapper and mortar attack on the morning of 4 December 1966. The attack was repulsed for the loss of three US and three ARVN killed and 28 VC killed and four captured.

RVNAF Women's Armed Forces Corps (WAFC) personnel with USAF adviser Captain Mary A. Marsh, June 1968

=== 1968 Tet Offensive ===
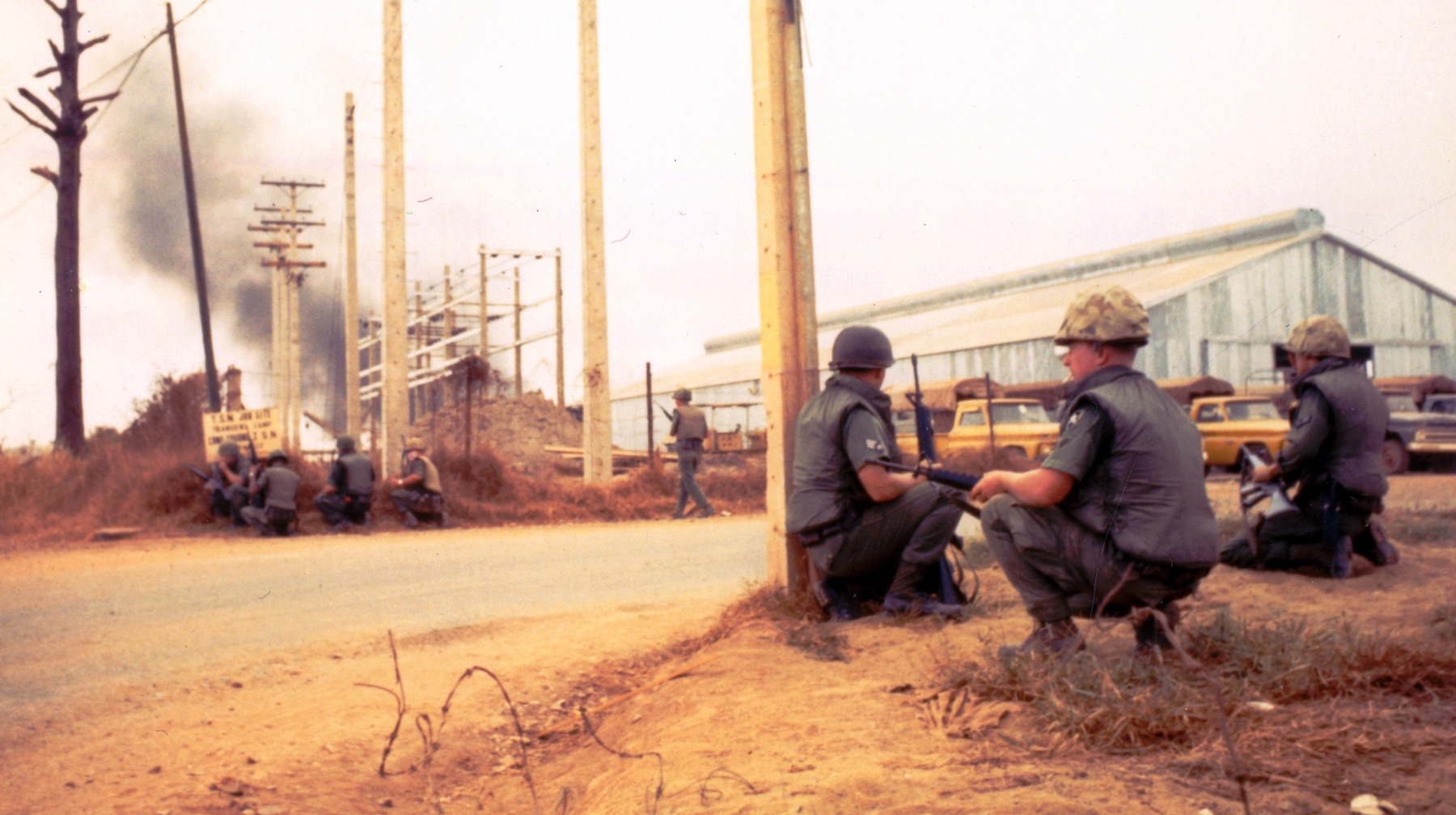
United States Air Force Security Police in combat at Tan Son Nhut during the 1968 Tet Offensive

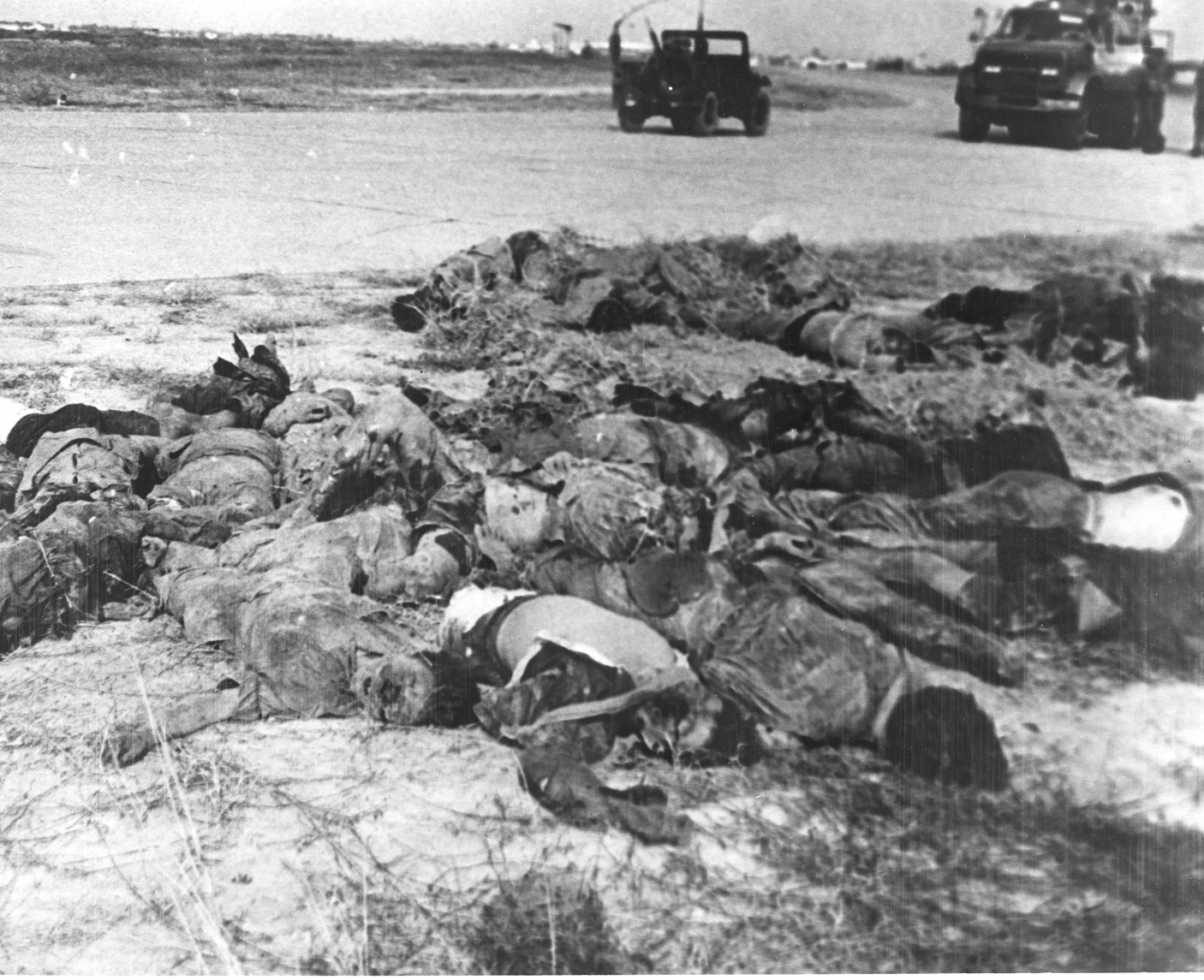
Viet Cong killed during the attack on Tan Son Nhut Air Base during the Tet Offensive

The base was the target of major VC attacks during the 1968 Tet Offensive. The attack began early on 31 January with greater severity than anyone had expected. When the VC attacked much of the RVNAF was on leave to be with their families during the lunar new year. An immediate recall was issued, and within 72 hours, 90 percent of the RVNAF was on duty.

The main VC attack was made against the western perimeter of the base by three VC Battalions. The initial penetration was contained by the base's 377th Security Police Squadron, ad-hoc Army units of Task Force 35, ad-hoc RVNAF units and two ARVN Airborne battalions. The 3rd Squadron, 4th Cavalry Regiment was sent from Củ Chi Base Camp and prevented follow-on forces west of the base from reinforcing the VC inside the base and engaged them in a village and factory west of the base. By 16:30 on 31 January the base was secured. U.S. losses were 22 killed and 82 wounded, ARVN losses 29 killed and 15 wounded, VC losses were more than 669 killed and 26 captured. Fourteen aircraft were damaged at the base.

Over the next three weeks, the RVNAF flew over 1,300 strike sorties, bombing and strafing PAVN/VC positions throughout South Vietnam. Transport aircraft from Tan Son Nhut's 33d Wing dropped almost 15,000 flares in 12 nights, compared with a normal monthly average of 10,000. Observation aircraft also from Tan Son Nhut completed almost 700 reconnaissance sorties, with RVNAF pilots flying O-1 Bird Dogs and U-17 Skywagons.

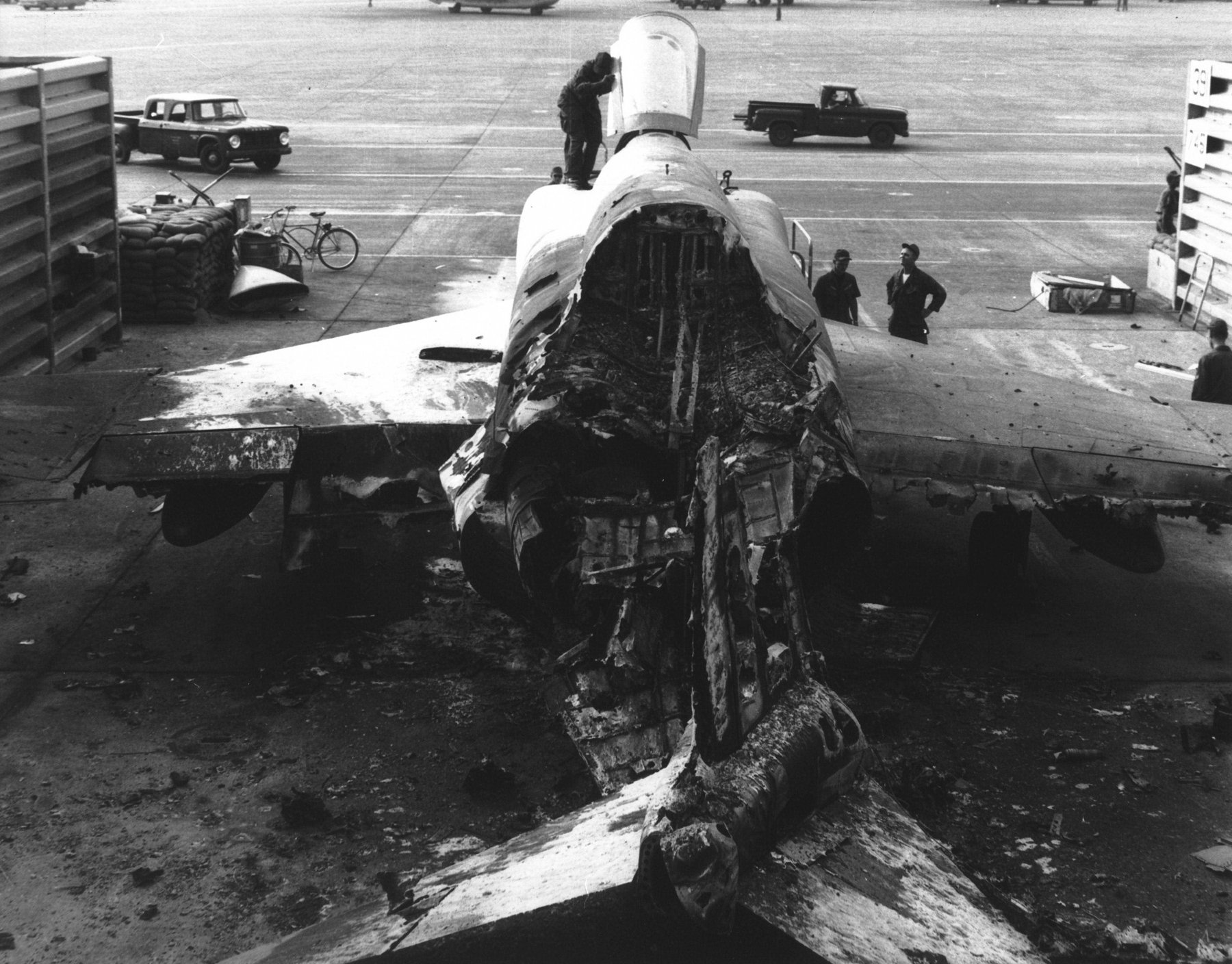
USAF F-4 Phantom II destroyed during a rocket attack on 18 February 1968

At 01:15 on 18 February a VC rocket and mortar attack on the base destroyed 6 aircraft and damaged 33 others and killed one person. A rocket attack the next day hit the civilian air terminal killing one person and six further rocket/mortar attacks over this period killed another six people and wounded 151. On 24 February another rocket and mortar attack damaged base buildings killing four US personnel and wounding 21.

On 12 June 1968 a mortar attack on the base destroyed two USAF aircraft and killed one airman.

The Tet Offensive attacks and previous losses due to mortar and rocket attacks on air bases across South Vietnam led the Deputy Secretary of Defense Paul Nitze on 6 March 1968 to approve the construction of 165 "Wonderarch" roofed aircraft shelters at the major air bases. In addition airborne "rocket watch" patrols were established in the Saigon-Biên Hòa area to reduce attacks by fire.

=== Vietnamization and the 1972 Easter Offensive ===
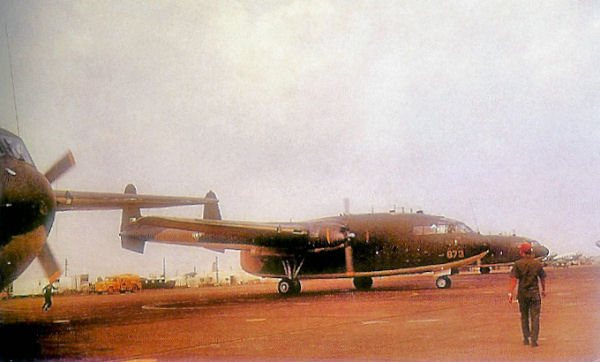
C-119Gs of the RVNAF 819th Transport Squadron

On 2 July 1969 the first 5 AC-47 Spooky gunships were handed over to the RVNAF to form the 817th Combat Squadron which became operational at the base on 31 August.

In 1970, with American units leaving the country, the RVNAF transport fleet was greatly increased at Tan Son Nhut. The RVNAF 33rd and 53rd Tactical Wings were established flying C-123 Providers, C-47s and C-7 Caribous.

In mid 1970 the USAF began training RVNAF crews on the AC-119G Shadow gunship at the base. Other courses included navigation classes and helicopter transition and maintenance training for the CH-47 Chinook.

By November 1970, the RVNAF took total control of the Direct Air Support Centers (DASCs) at Bien Hoa AB, Da Nang AB and Pleiku AB.

At the end of 1971, the RVNAF were totally in control of command and control units at eight major air bases, supporting ARVN units for the expanded air-ground operations system. In September 1971, the USAF transferred two C-119 squadrons to the RVNAF at Tan Son Nhut.

In 1972, the buildup of the RVNAF at Tan Son Nhut was expanded when two C-130 Hercules squadrons were formed there. In December, the first RVNAF C-130 training facility was established at Tan Son Nhut, enabling the RVNAF to train its own C-130s pilots. As more C-130s were transferred to the RVNAF, older C-123s were returned to the USAF for disposal.

As the buildup of the RVNAF continued, the success of the Vietnamization program was evident during the 1972 Easter Offensive. Responding to the People's Army of Vietnam (PAVN) attack, the RVNAF flew more than 20,000 strike sorties which helped to stem the advance. In the first month of the offensive, transports from Tan Son Nhut ferried thousands of troops and delivered nearly 4,000 tons of supplies throughout the country. The offensive also resulted in additional deliveries of aircraft to the RVNAF under Operation Enhance. Also, fighter aircraft arrived at Tan Son Nhut for the first time in the F-5A/B Freedom Fighter and the F-5E Tiger II. The F-5s were subsequently transferred to Bien Hoa and Da Nang ABs.

=== 1973 Ceasefire ===
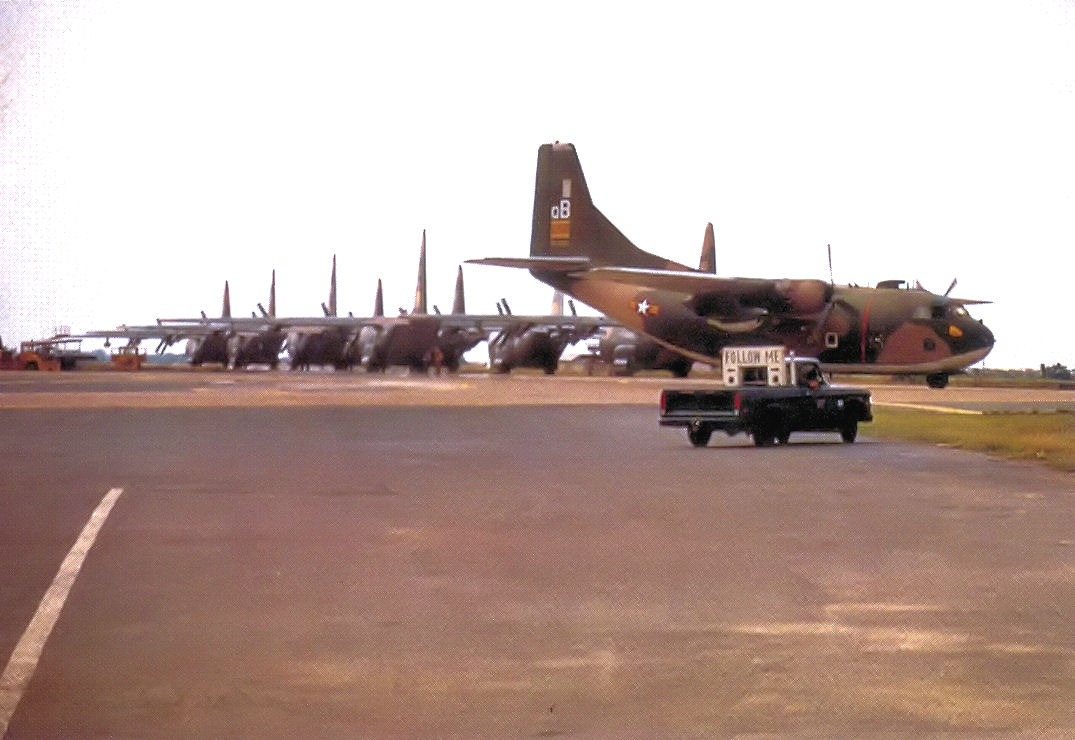
RVNAF C-123 55-4565 assigned to the 421st Transport Squadron

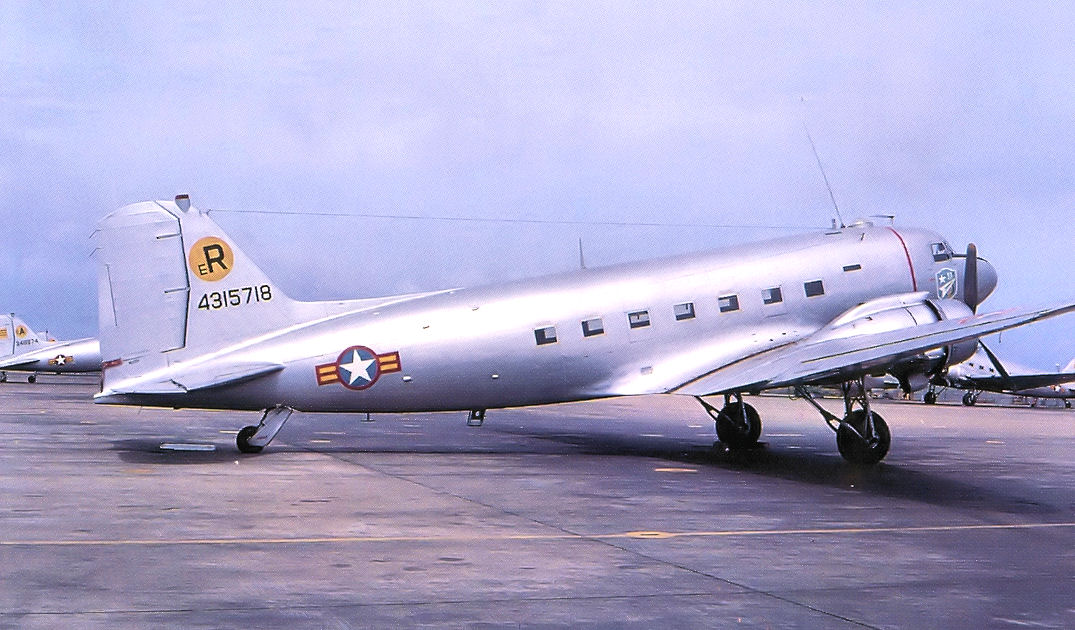
RVNAF Douglas C-47A of the 415th Transport Squadron. These C-47s remained in natural aluminum finish throughout the war

The Paris Peace Accords of 1973 brought an end to the United States advisory capacity in South Vietnam. In its place, as part of the agreement, the Americans retained a Defense Attaché Office (DAO) at Tan Son Nhut Airport, with small field offices at other facilities around the country. The technical assistance provided by the personnel of the DAOs and by civilian contractors was essential to the RVNAF, however, because of the cease-fire agreement, the South Vietnamese could not be advised in any way on military operations, tactics or techniques of employment. It was through the DAO that the American/South Vietnamese relationship was maintained, and it was primarily from this source that information from within South Vietnam was obtained. The RVNAF provided statistics with regards to the military capability of their units to the DAO, however the information was not always reliable.

From the Easter Offensive of 1972, it was clear that without United States aid, especially air support, the ARVN would not be able to defend itself against continuing PAVN attacks. This was demonstrated at the fighting around Pleiku, An Lộc and Quảng Trị where the ARVN would have been defeated without continuous air support, mainly supplied by the USAF. The ARVN relied heavily on air support, and with the absence of the USAF, full responsibility fell on the RVNAF alone. Although equipped with large numbers of Cessna A-37 Dragonfly and F-5 attack aircraft to carry out close air support, during the 1972 offensive, heavy bombardment duty was left to USAF aircraft.

As part of the Paris Peace Accords, a Joint Military Commission was established and VC/PAVN troops were deployed across South Vietnam to oversee the departure of US forces and the implementation of the ceasefire. 200-250 VC/PAVN soldiers were based at Camp Davis (see Davis Station below) at the base from March 1973 until the fall of South Vietnam.

Numerous violations of the Paris Peace Accords were committed by North Vietnamese beginning almost as soon as the United States withdrew its last personnel from South Vietnam by the end of March 1973. The North Vietnamese and the Provisional Revolutionary Government of South Vietnam continued their attempt to overthrow President Nguyễn Văn Thiệu and remove the U.S.-supported government. The U.S. had promised Thiệu that it would use airpower to support his government. On 14 January 1975 Secretary of Defense James Schlesinger stated that the U.S. was not living up to its promise that it would retaliate in the event North Vietnam tried to overwhelm South Vietnam.

When North Vietnam invaded in March 1975, the promised American intervention never materialized. Congress reflected the popular mood, halting the bombing in Cambodia effective 15 July 1973, and reducing aid to South Vietnam. Since Thiệu intended to fight the same kind of war he always had, with lavish use of firepower, the cuts in aid proved especially damaging.

=== Capture ===
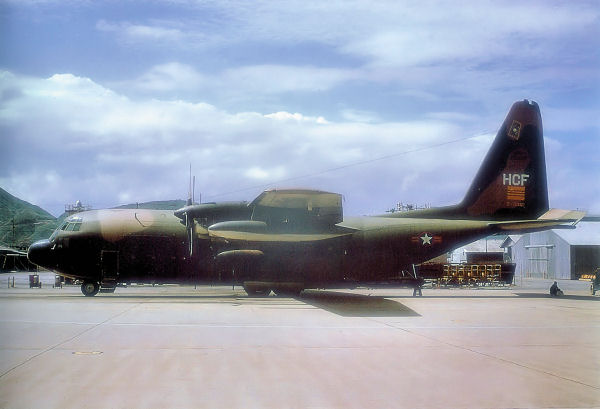
The Lockheed C-130A served with the Republic of Vietnam Air Force from October 1972 to April 1975

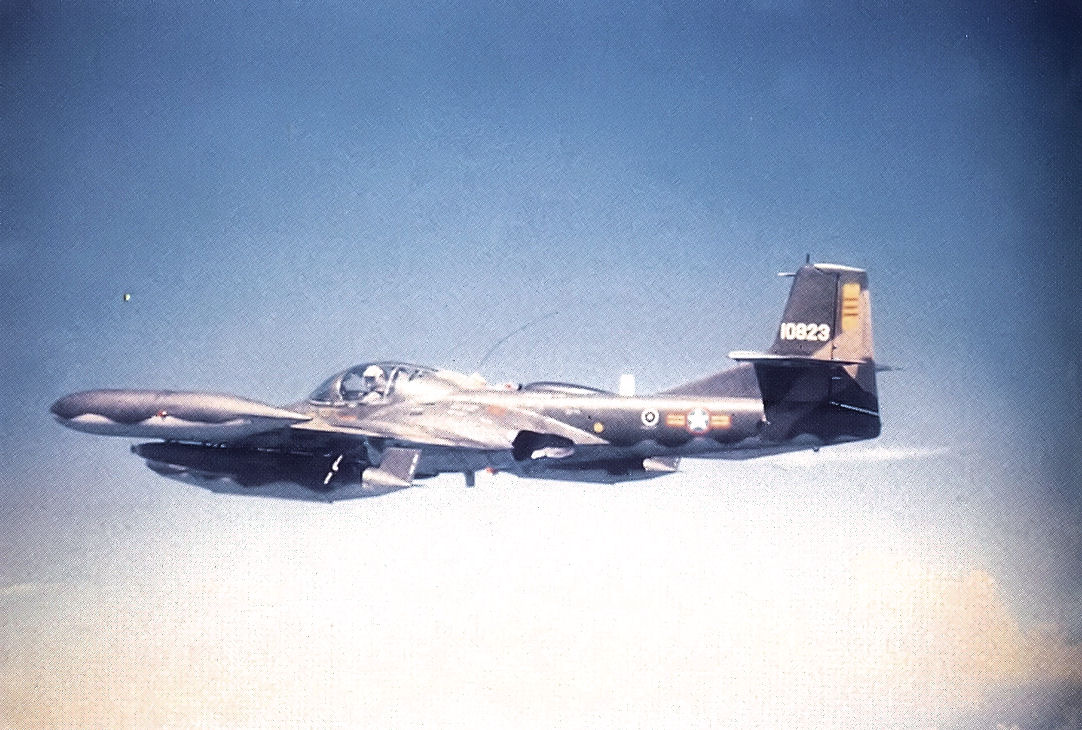
Captured RVNAF A-37 Dragonfly fighter-bombers were used by the Vietnam People's Air Force's Quyet Thang Squadron for theirs attack on Tan Son Nhut Air Base in 1975.

In early 1975 North Vietnam realized the time was right to achieve its goal of re-uniting Vietnam under communist rule, launching a series of small ground attacks to test U.S. reaction.

On 8 January the North Vietnamese Politburo ordered a PAVN offensive to "liberate" South Vietnam by cross-border invasion. The general staff plan for the invasion of South Vietnam called for 20 divisions, it anticipated a two-year struggle for victory.

By 14 March, South Vietnamese President Thiệu decided to abandon the Central Highlands region and two northern provinces of South Vietnam and ordered a general withdrawal of ARVN forces from those areas. Instead of an orderly withdrawal, it turned into a general retreat, with masses of military and civilians fleeing, clogging roads and creating chaos.

On 30 March 100,000 South Vietnamese soldiers surrendered after being abandoned by their commanding officers. The large coastal cities of Da Nang, Qui Nhơn, Tuy Hòa and Nha Trang were abandoned by the South Vietnamese, yielding the entire northern half of South Vietnam to the North Vietnamese.

By late March the US Embassy began to reduce the number of US citizens in Vietnam by encouraging dependents and non-essential personnel to leave the country by commercial flights and on Military Airlift Command (MAC) C-141 and C-5 aircraft, which were still bringing in emergency military supplies. In late March, two or three of these MAC aircraft were arriving each day and were used for the evacuation of civilians and Vietnamese orphans. On 4 April a C-5A aircraft carrying 250 Vietnamese orphans and their escorts suffered explosive decompression over the sea near Vũng Tàu and made a crash-landing while attempting to return to Tan Son Nhut; 153 people on board died in the crash.

As the war entered its conclusion, RVNAF pilots flew sortie after sortie, supporting the retreating ARVN after it abandoned Cam Ranh Bay on 14 April. For two days after the ARVN left the area, the Wing Commander at Phan Rang Air Base fought on with the forces under his command. Airborne troops were sent in for one last attempt to hold the airfield, but the defenders were finally overrun on 16 April and Phan Rang Air Base was lost.

On 22 April Xuân Lộc fell to the PAVN after a two-week battle with the ARVN 18th Division which inflicted over 5000 PAVN casualties and delayed the Ho Chi Minh Campaign for two weeks. With the fall of Xuân Lộc and the capture of Bien Hoa Air Base in late April 1975 it was clear that South Vietnam was about to fall to the PAVN.

By 22 April 20 C-141 and 20 C-130s flights a day were flying evacuees out of Tan Son Nhut to Clark Air Base, some 1,000 miles away in the Philippines. On 23 April President Ferdinand Marcos of the Philippines announced that no more than 2,500 Vietnamese evacuees would be allowed in the Philippines at any one time, further increasing the strain on MAC which now had to move evacuees out of Saigon and move some 5,000 evacuees from Clark Air Base on to Guam, Wake Island and Yokota Air Base. President Thiệu and his family left Tan Son Nhut on 25 April on a USAF C-118 to go into exile in Taiwan. Also on 25 April the Federal Aviation Administration banned commercial flights into South Vietnam. This directive was subsequently reversed; some operators had ignored it anyway. In any case this effectively marked the end of the commercial airlift from Tan Son Nhut.

On 27 April PAVN rockets hit Saigon and Cholon for the first time since the 1973 ceasefire. It was decided that from this time only C-130s would be used for the evacuation due to their greater maneuverability. There was relatively little difference between the cargo loads of the two aircraft, C-141s had been loaded with up to 316 evacuees while C-130s had been taking off with in excess of 240.

On 28 April at 18:06, three A-37 Dragonflies piloted by former RVNAF pilots, who had defected to the Vietnamese People's Air Force at the fall of Da Nang, dropped six Mk81 250 lb bombs on the base damaging aircraft. RVNAF F-5s took off in pursuit, but they were unable to intercept the A-37s. C-130s leaving Tan Son Nhut reported receiving PAVN .51 cal and 37 mm anti-aircraft (AAA) fire, while sporadic PAVN rocket and artillery attacks also started to hit the airport and air base. C-130 flights were stopped temporarily after the air attack but resumed at 20:00 on 28 April.

At 03:58 on 29 April, C-130E, #72-1297, flown by a crew from the 776th Tactical Airlift Squadron, was destroyed by a 122 mm rocket while taxiing to pick up refugees after offloading a BLU-82 at the base. The crew evacuated the burning aircraft on the taxiway and departed the airfield on another C-130 that had previously landed. This was the last USAF fixed-wing aircraft to leave Tan Son Nhut.

At dawn on 29 April the RVNAF began to haphazardly depart Tan Son Nhut Air Base as A-37s, F-5s, C-7s, C-119s and C-130s departed for Thailand while UH-1s took off in search of the ships of Task Force 76. Some RVNAF aircraft stayed to continue to fight the advancing PAVN. One AC-119 gunship had spent the night of 28/29 April dropping flares and firing on the approaching PAVN. At dawn on 29 April two A-1 Skyraiders began patrolling the perimeter of Tan Son Nhut at 2,500 feet (760 m) until one was shot down, presumably by an SA-7 missile. At 07:00 the AC-119 was firing on PAVN to the east of Tan Son Nhut when it too was hit by an SA-7 and fell in flames to the ground.

At 08:00 on 29 April Lieutenant General Trần Văn Minh, commander of the RVNAF and 30 of his staff arrived at the DAO Compound demanding evacuation, signifying the complete loss of RVNAF command and control. At 10:51 on 29 April, the order was given by CINCPAC to commence Operation Frequent Wind, the helicopter evacuation of US personnel and at-risk Vietnamese.

In the final evacuation, over a hundred RVNAF aircraft arrived in Thailand, including twenty-six F-5s, eight A-37s, eleven A-1s, six C-130s, thirteen C-47s, five C-7s, and three AC-119s. Additionally close to 100 RVNAF helicopters landed on U.S. ships off the coast, although at least half were jettisoned. One O-1 managed to land on the USS Midway, carrying a South Vietnamese major, his wife, and five children.

The ARVN 3rd Task Force, 81st Ranger Group commanded by Major Pham Chau Tai defended Tan Son Nhut and they were joined by the remnants of the Loi Ho unit. At 07:15 on 30 April the PAVN 24th Regiment approached the Bay Hien intersection (10.793°N 106.653°E) 1.5 km from the base's main gate. The lead T-54 was hit by M67 recoilless rifle and then the next T-54 was hit by a shell from an M48 tank. The PAVN infantry moved forward and engaged the ARVN in house to house fighting forcing them to withdraw to the base by 08:45. The PAVN then sent three tanks and an infantry battalion to assault the main gate and they were met by intensive anti-tank and machine gun fire knocking out the three tanks and killing at least 20 PAVN soldiers. The PAVN tried to bring forward an 85mm antiaircraft gun but the ARVN knocked it out before it could start firing. The PAVN 10th Division ordered eight more tanks and another infantry battalion to join the attack, but as they approached the Bay Hien intersection they were hit by an airstrike from RVNAF jets operating from Binh Thuy Air Base which destroyed two T-54s. The six surviving tanks arrived at the main gate at 10:00 and began their attack, with two being knocked out by antitank fire in front of the gate and another destroyed as it attempted a flanking manoeuvre. At approximately 10:30 Pham heard of the surrender broadcast of President Dương Văn Minh and went to the ARVN Joint General Staff Compound to seek instructions, he called Minh who told him to prepare to surrender, Pham reportedly told Minh "If Viet Cong tanks are entering Independence Palace we will come down there to rescue you sir." Minh refused Pham's suggestion and Pham then told his men to withdraw from the base gates and at 11:30 the PAVN entered the base.

Following the war, Tan Son Nhut Air Base was taken over as a base for the Vietnam People's Air Force.

=== Known RVNAF units (June 1974) ===
Tan Son Nhut Air Base was the Headquarters of the RVNAF. It was also the headquarters of the RVNAF 5th Air Division.

Vietnamese Air Force Unit Emblems at Tan Son Nhut Air Base

- 33d Tactical Wing
  - 314th Special Air Missions SquadronVC-47, U-17, UH-1, DC-6B
  - 716th Reconnaissance Squadron R/EC-47, U-6A
  - 718th Reconnaissance Squadron EC-47
  - 429th Transport Squadron C-7B
  - 431st Transport Squadron C-7B
  - Det H 259th Helicopter Squadron Bell UH-1H (Medevac)
- 53d Tactical Wing
  - 819th Combat Squadron AC-119G
  - 821st Combat Squadron AC-119G
  - 435th Transport Squadron C-130A
  - 437th Transport Squadron C-130A

== Use by the United States ==
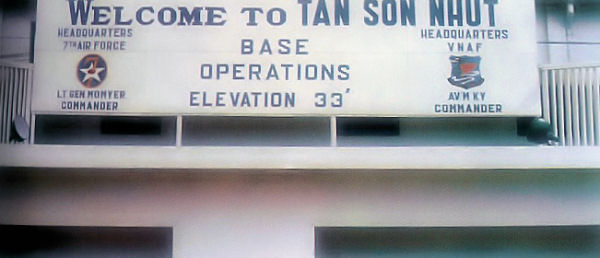
Welcome sign, 1967

During the Vietnam War Tan Son Nhut Air Base was important for both the USAF and the RVNAF. The base served as the focal point for the initial USAF deployment and buildup in South Vietnam in the early 1960s. Tan Son Nhut was initially the main air base for MAC flights to and from South Vietnam, until other bases such as Bien Hoa and Cam Ranh opened in 1966. After 1966, with the establishment of the 7th Air Force as the main USAF command and control headquarters in South Vietnam, Tan Son Nhut functioned as a headquarters, a Tactical Reconnaissance base, and as a Special Operations base. With the drawdown of US forces in South Vietnam after 1971, the base took on a myriad of organizations transferred from deactivated bases across South Vietnam.

Between 1968 and 1974, Tan Son Nhut Airport was one of the busiest military airbases in the world. Pan Am schedules from 1973 showed Boeing 747 service was being operated four times a week to San Francisco via Guam and Manila. Continental Airlines operated up to 30 Boeing 707 military charters per week to and from Tan Son Nhut Airport during the 1968–74 period.

It was from Tan Son Nhut Air Base that the last U.S. airman left South Vietnam in March 1973. The Air Force Post Office (APO) for Tan Son Nhut Air Base was APO San Francisco, 96307.

=== Military Assistance Advisory Group ===
==== Davis Station ====
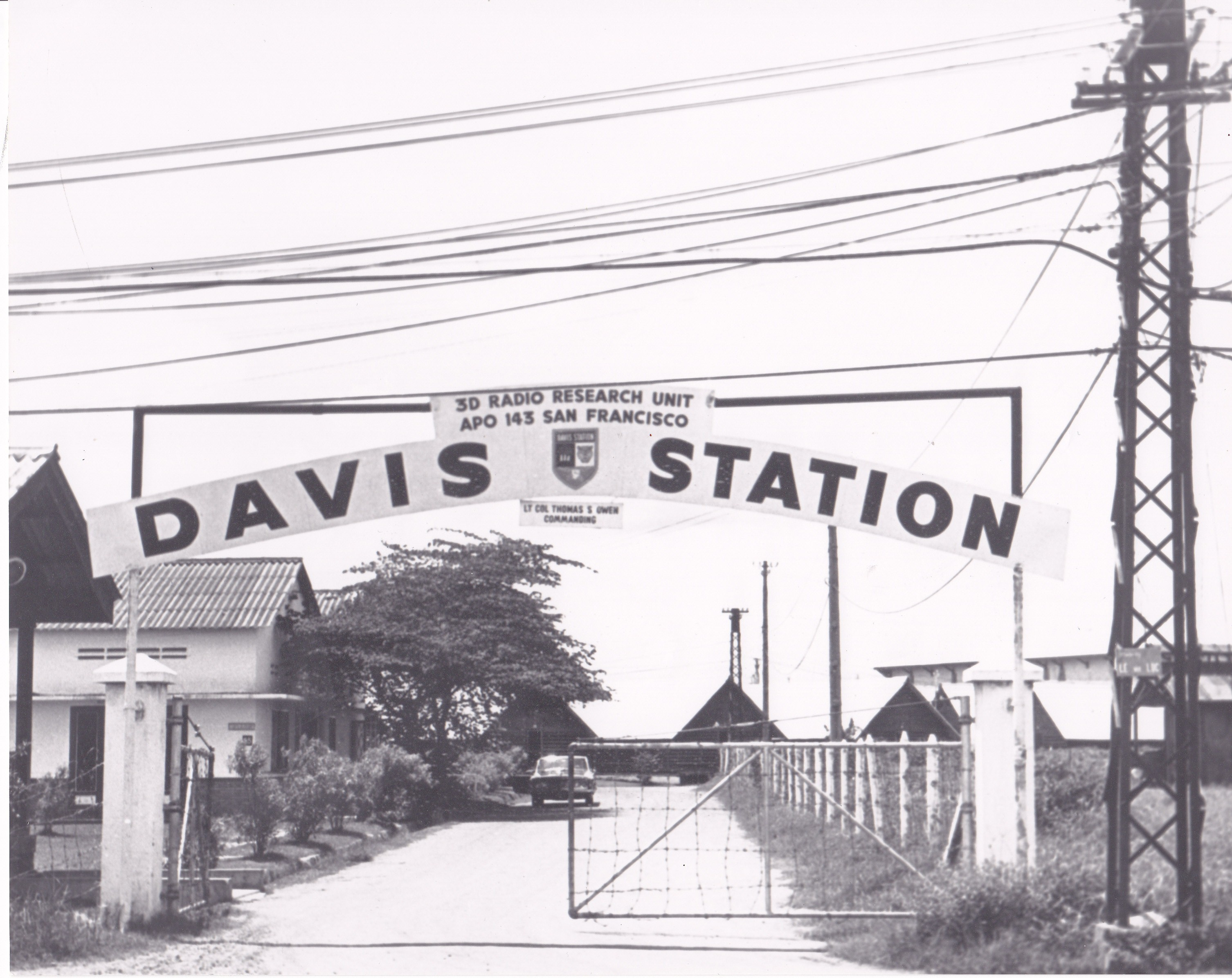
Davis Station

On 13 May 1961 a 92-man unit of the Army Security Agency, operating under cover of the 3rd Radio Research Unit (3rd RRU), arrived at Tan Son Nhut AB and established a communications intelligence facility in disused RVNAF warehouses on the base (10.81°N 106.649°E). This was the first full deployment of a US Army unit to South Vietnam. On 22 December 1961 SP4 James T. Davis of the 3rd RRU was operating a mobile PRD-1 receiver with an ARVN unit near Cầu Xáng when they were ambushed by VC and Davis was killed, becoming one of the first Americans killed in the Vietnam War. In early January 1962 the 3rd RRU's compound at Tan Son Nhut was renamed Davis Station.

On 1 June 1966 the 3rd RRU was redesignated the 509th Radio Research Group. The 509th RR Group continued operations until 7 March 1973, when they were among the last US units to leave South Vietnam.

==== 507th Tactical Control Group ====
In late September 1961, the first permanent USAF unit, the 507th Tactical Control Group from Shaw Air Force Base deployed sixty-seven officers and airmen to Tan Son Nhut to install MPS-11 search and MPS-16 height-finding radars and began monitoring air traffic and training of RVNAF personnel to operate and service the equipment. Installation of the equipment commenced on 5 October 1961 and the unit would eventually grow to 314 assigned personnel. This organization formed the nucleus of South Vietnam's tactical air control system.

==== Tactical Reconnaissance Mission ====
On 18 October 1961, four RF-101C Voodoos and a photo processing unit from the 15th Tactical Reconnaissance Squadron of the 67th Tactical Reconnaissance Wing, based at Yokota AB Japan, arrived at Tan Son Nhut, with the reconnaissance craft flying photographic missions over South Vietnam and Laos from 20 October under Operation Pipe Stem. The RF-101s would depart in January 1962 leaving Detachment 1, 15th Tactical Reconnaissance Squadron to undertake photo-processing.

In March 1962 a C-54 Skymaster outfitted for infrared reconnaissance arrived at the base and remained until February 1963, when it was replaced by a Brave Bull Boeing C-97 Stratofreighter.

In December 1962 following the signing of the International Agreement on the Neutrality of Laos, which banned aerial reconnaissance over Laos, all four Able Marble RF-101Cs arrived at Tan Son Nhut from Don Muang Royal Thai Air Force Base.

On 13 April 1963 the 13th Reconnaissance Technical Squadron was established at the base to provide photo interpretation and targeting information.

Following the Gulf of Tonkin Incident on 4 August 1964, six additional RF-101Cs deployed to the base.

The 67th TRW was soon followed by detachments of the 15th Tactical Reconnaissance Squadron of the 18th Tactical Fighter Wing, based at Kadena AB, Okinawa, which also flew RF-101 reconnaissance missions over Laos and South Vietnam, first from bases at Udorn Royal Thai Air Force Base, Thailand from 31 March 1965 to 31 October 1967 and then from South Vietnam. These reconnaissance missions lasted from November 1961 through the spring of 1964.

RF-101Cs flew pathfinder missions for F-100s during Operation Flaming Dart, the first USAF strike against North Vietnam on 8 February 1965. They initially operated out of South Vietnam, but later flew most of their missions over North Vietnam out of Thailand. Bombing missions against the North required a large amount of photographic reconnaissance support, and by the end of 1967, all but one of the Tactical Air Command RF-101C squadrons were deployed to Southeast Asia.

The reconnaissance Voodoos at Tan Son Nhut were incorporated into the 460th Tactical Reconnaissance Wing in February 1966. 1 RF-101C was destroyed in a sapper attack on Tan Son Nhut AB. The last 45th TRS RF-101C left Tan Son Nhut on 16 November 1970.

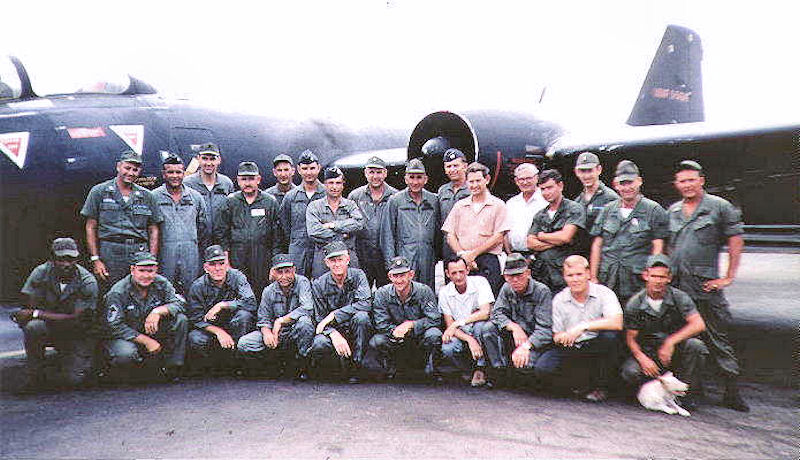
Det 1 460th Tactical Reconnaissance Wing Tan Son Nhut Air Base South Vietnam with RB-57E 55–4264, early 1968

The need for additional reconnaissance assets, especially those capable of operating at night, led to the deployment of two Martin RB-57E Canberra Patricia Lynn reconnaissance aircraft of the 6091st Reconnaissance Squadron on 7 May 1963. The forward nose section of the RB-57Es were modified to house a KA-1 36-inch forward oblique camera and a low panoramic KA-56 camera used on the Lockheed U-2. Mounted inside the specially configured bomb bay door was a KA-1 vertical camera, a K-477 split vertical day-night camera, an infrared scanner, and a KA-1 left oblique camera. The Detachment flew nighttime reconnaissance missions to identify VC base camps, small arms factories, and storage and training areas. The Patricia Lynn operation was terminated in mid-1971 with the inactivation of the 460th TRW and the four surviving aircraft returned to the United States.

On 20 December 1964 Military Assistance Command, Vietnam (MACV) formed the Central Target Analysis and Research Center at the base as a component of its J-2 Intelligence staff branch to coordinate Army and USAF infrared reconnaissance.

On 30 October 1965 the first RF-4C Phantom IIs of the 16th Tactical Reconnaissance Squadron arrived at the base and on 16 November they began flying missions over Laos and North Vietnam.

==== Farm Gate ====
On 11 October 1961, President John F. Kennedy directed, in NSAM 104, that the Defense Secretary "introduce the Air Force 'Jungle Jim' Squadron into Vietnam for the initial purpose of training Vietnamese forces." The 4400th Combat Crew Training Squadron was to proceed as a training mission and not for combat. The unit would be officially titled 4400th Combat Crew Training Squadron, code named Farm Gate. In mid-November the first eight Farm Gate T-28s arrived at the base from Clark Air Base. At the same time Detachments 7 and 8, 6009th Tactical Support Group were established at the base to support operations. On 20 May these detachments were redesignated the 6220th Air Base Squadron.

In February 1963 four RB-26C night photo-reconnaissance aircraft joined the Farm Gate planes at the base.

==== Tactical Air Control Center ====
The establishment of a country-wide tactical air control center was regarded as a priority for the effective utilisation of the RVNAF's limited strike capabilities, in addition an air operations center for central planning of air operations and a subordinate radar reporting center were also required. From 2–14 January the 5th Tactical Control Group was deployed to the base, beginning operations on 13 January 1962.

In March 1963 MACV formed a flight service center and network at the base for the control of all US military flights in South Vietnam.

==== Mule Train ====
On 6 December 1961, the Defense Department ordered the C-123 equipped 346th Troop Carrier Squadron (Assault) to the Far East for 120 days temporary duty. On 2 January 1962 the first of 16 C-123s landed at the base commencing Operation Mule Train to provide logistical support to US and South Vietnamese forces.

In March 1962 personnel from the 776th Troop Carrier Squadron, began replacing the temporary duty personnel. Ten of the C-123s were based at Tan Son Nhut, two at Da Nang Air Base and four at Clark Air Base.

In April 1963 the 777th Troop Carrier Squadron equipped with 16 C-123s deployed to the base.

In July 1963 the Mule Train squadrons at the base became the 309th and 310th Troop Carrier Squadrons assigned to the 315th Air Division.

==== Dirty Thirty ====
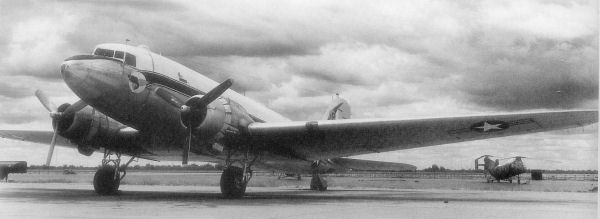
RVNAF DC-3 being flown by USAF "Dirty Thirty" pilots, 1962

Additional USAF personnel arrived at Tan Son Nhut in early 1962 after the RVNAF transferred two dozen seasoned pilots from the 1st Transportation Group at Tan Son Nhut to provide aircrews for the newly activated 2nd Fighter Squadron then undergoing training at Bien Hoa AB. This sudden loss of qualified C-47 pilots brought the 1st Transportation Group's airlift capability dangerously low. In order to alleviate the problem, United States Secretary of Defense Robert McNamara, on the recommendation of MAAG Vietnam, ordered thirty USAF pilots temporarily assigned to the RVNAF to serve as C-47 co-pilots. This influx of U.S. personnel quickly returned the 1st Transportation Group to full strength.

Unlike the USAF Farm Gate personnel at Bien Hoa Air Base, the C-47 co-pilots actually became part of the RVNAF operational structure – though still under U.S. control. Because of their rather unusual situation, these pilots soon adopted the very unofficial nickname, The Dirty Thirty. In a sense they were the first U.S. airmen actually committed to combat in Vietnam, rather than being assigned as advisors or support personnel. The original Dirty Thirty pilots eventually rotated home during early 1963 and were replaced by a second contingent of American pilots. This detachment remained with the RVNAF until December 1963 when they were withdrawn from Vietnam.

==== 509th Fighter-Interceptor Squadron ====
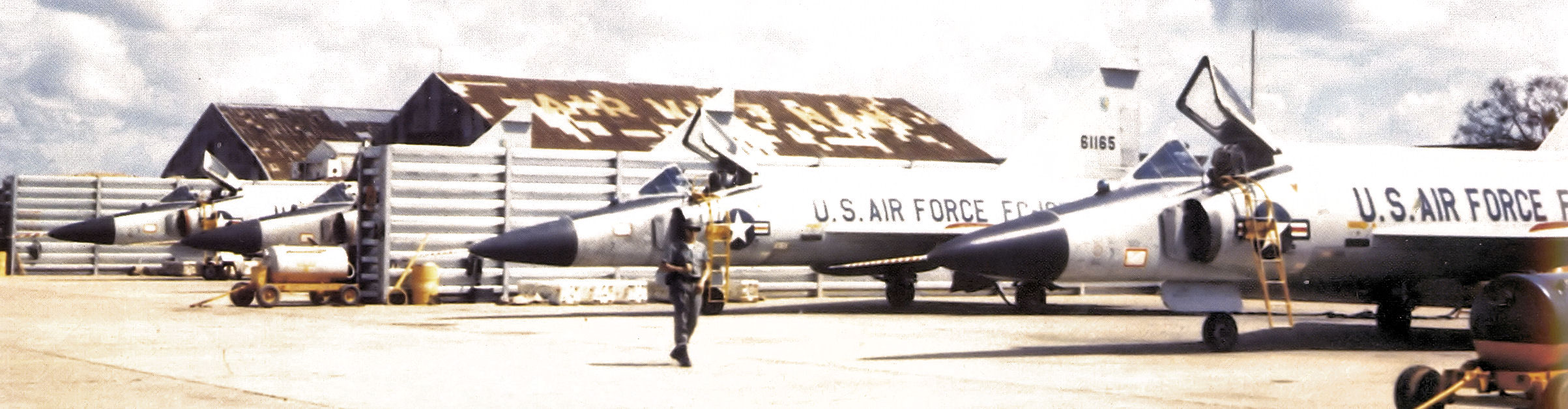
509th Fighter-Interceptor Squadron F-102s Tan Son Nhut Air Base, 1962

Starting on 21 March 1962 under Project Water Glass and later remaining under Project Candy Machine, the 509th Fighter-Interceptor Squadron began rotating F-102A Delta Dagger interceptors to Tan Son Nhut Air Base from Clark AB on a rotating basis to provide air defense of the Saigon area in the event of a North Vietnamese air attack. F-102s and TF-102s (two-seat trainer version) were deployed to Tan Son Nhut initially because ground radar sites frequently painted small aircraft penetrating South Vietnamese airspace.

The F-102, a supersonic, high altitude fighter interceptor designed to intercept Soviet bombers was given the mission of intercepting, identifying and, if necessary, destroying small aircraft, flying from treetop level to 2000 ft at speeds less than the final approach landing speed of the F-102. The TF-102, employing two pilots with one acting solely as radar intercept operator, was considered to be safer and more efficient as a low altitude interceptor. The T/F-102s would alternate with US Navy AD-5Qs. In May 1963 due to overcrowding at the base and the low-probability of air attack the T/F-102s and AD-5Qs were withdrawn to Clark AB from where they could redeploy to Tan Son Nhut on 12–24 hours' notice.

Following the Gulf of Tonkin Incident, 6 F-102s from the 16th Fighter Squadron deployed to the base.

Before the rotation ended in July 1970, pilots and F-102 aircraft from other Far East squadrons were used in the deployment.

=== Air rescue ===
In January 1962 5 USAF personnel from the Pacific Air Rescue Center were assigned to the base to establish a Search and Rescue Center, without having any aircraft assigned they were dependent on support from US Army advisers in each of South Vietnam's four military corps areas to use US Army and Marine Corps helicopters. In April 1962 the unit was designated Detachment 3, Pacific Air Rescue Center.

On 1 July 1965 Detachment 3 was redesignated the 38th Air Rescue Squadron and activated with its headquarters at the base and organized to control search and rescue detachments operating from bases in South Vietnam and Thailand. Detachment 14, an operational base rescue element, was later established at the base.

On 8 January 1966 the 3d Aerospace Recovery Group was established at the base to control search and rescue operations throughout the theater.

On 1 July 1971 the entire 38th ARRS was inactivated. Local base rescue helicopters and their crews then became detachments of the parent unit, the 3d Aerospace Rescue and Recovery Group.

In February 1973 the 3d Aerospace Rescue and Recovery Group left Tan Son Nhut AB and moved to Nakhon Phanom Royal Thai Navy Base.

=== Miscellaneous units ===
From December 1961, the 8th and 57th Transportation Companies (Light Helicopter) arrived with Piasecki CH-21C Shawnee's.

From 1962 the Utility Tactical Transport Helicopter Company (UTTHCO) was based here initially with Bell HU-1A Huey's then UH-1B's.

The 1964th Communications Squadron was designated and organized at Tan Son Nhut on 1 May 1962, in accordance with AFCS G-23 instructions of 29 March 1962. It was assigned to the Southeast Asia Communications Region (itself part of the Pacific Communications Area), Air Force Communications Service. It was upgraded to become the 1964th Communications Group on 1 October 1962 and appears to have directed about 10 squadrons in the Republic of Vietnam. It provided communications and navaids for Air Force fixed bases in the country. One of its squadrons was the 1876th Communications Squadron, designated and organized at Tan Son Nhut on 1 November 1965. The 1876th Communications Squadron was reassigned on 1 April 1972, and moved to the United States Air Force Academy in Colorado.

The 57th Medical Detachment (Helicopter Ambulance) with UH-1B Hueys from January 1963.

During December 1964 the 145th Aviation Battalion were deployed here.

In April 1964 five EC-121D airborne early warning aircraft began staging from the base.

In June 1964 Detachment 2, 421st Air Refueling Squadron equipped with KB-50 aerial refueling aircraft deployed to the base to support Yankee Team operations over Laos.

In April 1965 a detachment of the 9th Tactical Reconnaissance Squadron comprising four RB–66Bs and two EB–66Cs arrived at the base. The RB–66Bs were equipped with night photo and infrared sensor equipment and began reconnaissance missions over South Vietnam, while the EB–66Cs began flying missions against North Vietnamese air defense radars. By the end of May, two more EB–66Cs arrived at the base and they all then redeployed to Takhli Royal Thai Air Force Base.

In mid-May 1965, following the disaster at Bien Hoa the 10 surviving B-57 bombers were transferred to Tan Son Nhut AB and continued to fly sorties on a reduced scale until replacement aircraft arrived from Clark AB. In June 1965, the B-57s were moved from Tan Son Nhut AB to Da Nang AB.

On 8 October 1965 the 20th Helicopter Squadron equipped with 14 CH-3 helicopters was activated at the base, it moved to Nha Trang Air Base on 15 June 1966.

=== 33rd Tactical Group ===
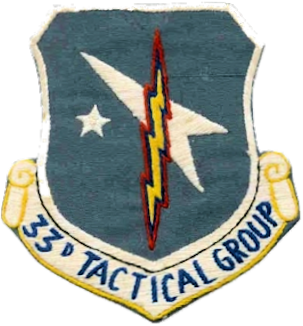

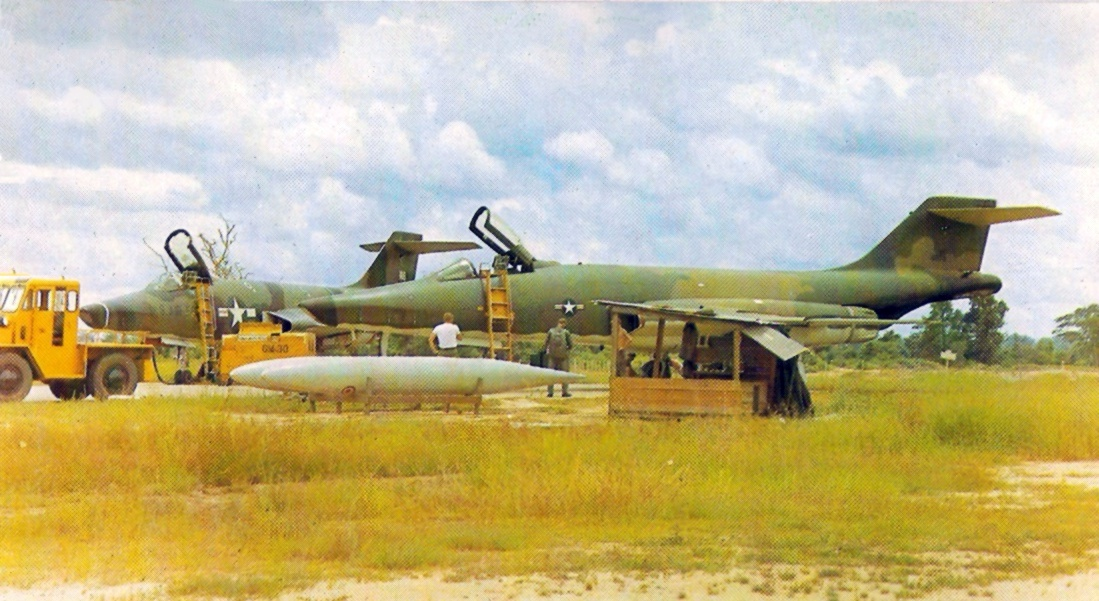
33rd Tactical Group RF-101Cs at Tan Son Nhut, 1965

On 8 July 1963 the units at the base were organized as the 33d Tactical Group, with subordinate units being the 33rd Air Base Squadron, the 33rd Consolidated Aircraft maintenance Squadron and the Detachment 1 reconnaissance elements. The Group's mission was to maintain and operate base support facilities at Tan Son Nhut, supporting the 2d Air Division and subordinate units by performing reconnaissance.

==== 505th Tactical Air Control Group ====
The 505th Tactical Air Control Group was assigned to Tan Son Nhut on 8 April 1964. The Unit was primarily responsible for controlling the tactical air resources of the US and its allies in South Vietnam, Thailand, and to some extent Cambodia and Laos. Carrying out the mission of providing tactical air support required two major components, radar installations and forward air controllers (FACs).

The radar sites provided flight separation for attack and transport aircraft which took the form of flight following and, in some cases control by USAF Weapons Directors. FACs had the critical job of telling tactical fighters where to drop their ordnance. FAC's were generally attached to either US Army or ARVN units and served both on the ground and in the air.

Squadrons of the 505th located at Tan Son Nhut AB were:

- 619th Tactical Control Squadron activated at the base on 8 April 1964 It was responsible for operating and maintaining air traffic control and radar direction-finding equipment for the area from the Mekong Delta to Buôn Ma Thuột in the Central Highlands with detachments at various smaller airfields throughout its operational area. It remained operational until 15 March 1973.
- 505th Tactical Control Maintenance Squadron

==== Close air support ====
Following the introduction of US ground combat units in mid-1965, two F-100 squadrons were deployed to Tan Son Nhut AB to provide close air support for US ground forces:

- 481st Tactical Fighter Squadron, 29 June 1965 – 1 January 1966
- 416th Tactical Fighter Squadron, 1 November 1965 – 15 June 1966

The 481st returned to the United States; the 416th returned to Bien Hoa.

=== 6250th Combat Support Group ===
The first tasks facing the USAF, however, were to set up a workable organizational structure in the region, improve the area's inadequate air bases, create an efficient airlift system, and develop equipment and techniques to support the ground battle.

Starting in 1965, the USAF adjusted its structure in Southeast Asia to absorb incoming units. Temporarily deployed squadrons became permanent in November. A wing structure replaced the groups. On 8 July 1965, the 33d Tactical Group was redesignated the 6250th Combat Support Group.

The number of personnel at Tan Son Nhut AB increased from 7780 at the beginning of 1965 to over 15,000 by the end of the year, placing substantial demands for accommodation and basic infrastructure.

On 14 November 1965 the 4th Air Commando Squadron equipped with 20 AC-47 Spooky gunships arrived at the base and was assigned to the 6250th Group. The aircraft were soon deployed to forward operating locations at Binh Thuy, Da Nang, Nha Trang and Pleiku Air Bases. In May 1966 the 4th Air Commando Squadron moved its base to Nha Trang AB where it came under the control of the 14th Air Commando Wing.

=== 460th Tactical Reconnaissance Wing ===
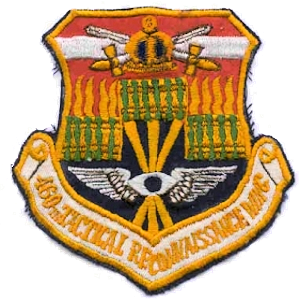

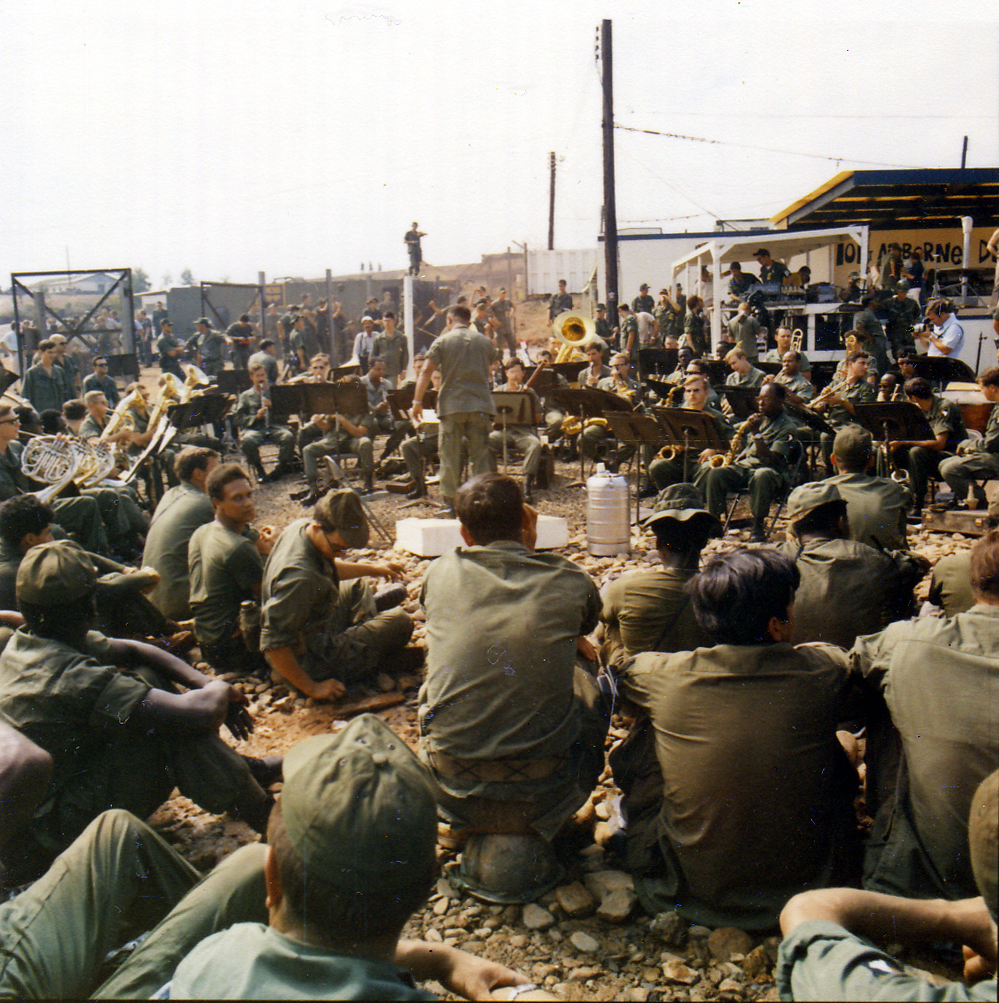
The Army Band plays Christmas music at the Tan Nhut Air Base, 22–9 December 1970

On 18 February 1966 the 460th Tactical Reconnaissance Wing was activated. Its headquarters were shared with the Seventh Air Force Headquarters and MACV. When it stood up, the 460th TRW, alone, was responsible for the entire reconnaissance mission, both visual and electronic, throughout the whole theater. On 18 February 1966 the wing began activities with 74 aircraft of various types. By the end of June 1966, that number climbed to over 200 aircraft. When the 460th TRW stood up, the Wing gained several flying units at Tan Son Nhut:

- 16th Tactical Reconnaissance Squadron (RF-4C)
- 20th Tactical Reconnaissance Squadron: 12 November 1965 – 1 April 1966 (RF-101C)
- Detachment 1 of the 460th Tactical Reconnaissance Wing

On 15 October 1966, the 460th TRW assumed aircraft maintenance responsibilities for Tan Son Nhut AB, including being responsible for all depot-level aircraft maintenance responsibility for all USAF organizations in South Vietnam. In addition to the reconnaissance operations, the 460th TFW's base flight operated in-theater transport service for Seventh Air Force and other senior commanders throughout South Vietnam. The base flight operated T-39A Saberliners, VC-123B Providers (also known as the "White Whale"), and U-3Bs between 1967 and 1971.

==== Photographic reconnaissance ====
- 45th Tactical Reconnaissance Squadron: 30 March 1966 – 31 December 1970 (RF-101C Tail Code: AH)
- 12th Tactical Reconnaissance Squadron: 2 September 1966 – 31 August 1971 (RF-4C Tail Code: AC)

On 18 September 1966, the 432d Tactical Reconnaissance Wing was activated at Takhli Royal Thai Air Force Base, Thailand. After the 432d TRW activated it took control of the reconnaissance squadrons in Thailand. With the activation of the 432d TRW, the 460th TRW was only responsible for RF-101 and RF-4C operations.

In 1970 the need for improved coordinate data of Southeast Asia for targeting purposes led to Loran-C-equipped RF–4Cs taking detailed photographs of target areas which were matched with the Loran coordinates of terrain features on the photo maps to calculate the precise coordinates. This information was converted into a computer program which by mid-1971 was used by the 12th Reconnaissance Intelligence Technical Squadron at the base for targeting.

==== Electronic reconnaissance ====
A few months after the 460th TRW's activation, two squadrons activated on 8 April 1966 as 460th TRW Det 2:

- 360th Tactical Electronic Warfare Squadron: 8 April 1966 – 31 August 1971 (EC-47N/P/Q Tail Code: AJ)
- 361st Tactical Electronic Warfare Squadron: 8 April 1966 – 31 August 1971 (EC-47N/P/Q Tail Code: AL) (Nha Trang Air Base)
- 362d Tactical Electronic Warfare Squadron: 1 February 1967 – 31 August 1971 (EC-47N/P/Q Tail Code: AN) (Pleiku Air Base)

Project Hawkeye conducted radio direction finding (RDF), whose main target were VC radio transmitters. Before this program RDF involved tracking the signals on the ground. Because this exposed the RDF team to ambushes, both the US Army and USAF began to look at airborne RDF. While the US Army used U-6 Beaver and U-8 Seminole aircraft for its own version of the Hawkeye platform, the USAF modified several C-47 Skytrains.

Project Phyllis Ann also used modified C-47s, however, the C-47s for this program were highly modified with an advanced navigational and reconnaissance equipment. On 4 April 1967, project Phyllis Ann changed to become Compass Dart. On 1 April 1968, Compass Dart became Combat Cougar. Because of security concerns the operation's name changed two more times first to Combat Cross and then to Commando Forge.

Project Drillpress also used modified C-47s, listening into VC/PAVN traffic and collected intelligence from it. This data gave insights into the plans and strategy of both the VC and the PAVN. Information from all three projects contributed in a major way to the intelligence picture of the battlefield in Vietnam. In fact about 95 percent of the Arc Light strikes conducted in South Vietnam were based, at least partially, on the data from these three programs. On 6 October 1967, Drillpress changed to Sentinel Sara.

The US would go to great lengths to prevent this equipment from falling into enemy hands, when an EC-47 from the 362d TEWS crashed on 22 April 1970, members of an explosive ordnance unit policed the area destroying anything they found and six F-100 tactical air sorties hit the area to be sure.

Detachments of these squadrons operated from different locations, including bases in Thailand. Each of the main squadrons and their detachments moved at least once due to operational and/or security reasons. Personnel operating the RDF and signal intelligence equipment in the back of the modified EC-47s were part of the 6994th Security Squadron.

On 1 June 1969 the unit transferred to become 360th TEWS Det 1.

==== Inactivation ====
As the Vietnamization program began, Vietnamese crews began flying with EC-47 crews from the 360th TEWS and 6994th SS, on 8 May 1971, to get training on operating the aircraft and its systems. The wing was inactivated in-place on 31 August 1971. Decorations awarded to the wing for its Vietnam War service include:

- Presidential Unit Citation: 18 February 1966 – 30 June 1967; 1 September 1967 – 1 July 1968; 11 July 1968 – 31 August 1969; l February-31 March 1971.
- Air Force Outstanding Unit Award with Combat "V" Device: 1 July 1969 – 30 June 1970; 1 July 1970 – 30 June 1971.
- Republic of Vietnam Gallantry Cross with Palm: 1 August 1966 – 31 August 1971.

=== 315th Air Commando Wing, Troop Carrier ===
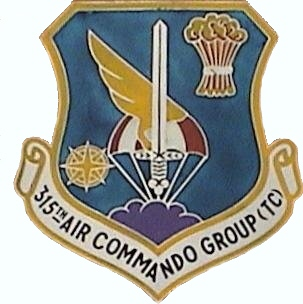

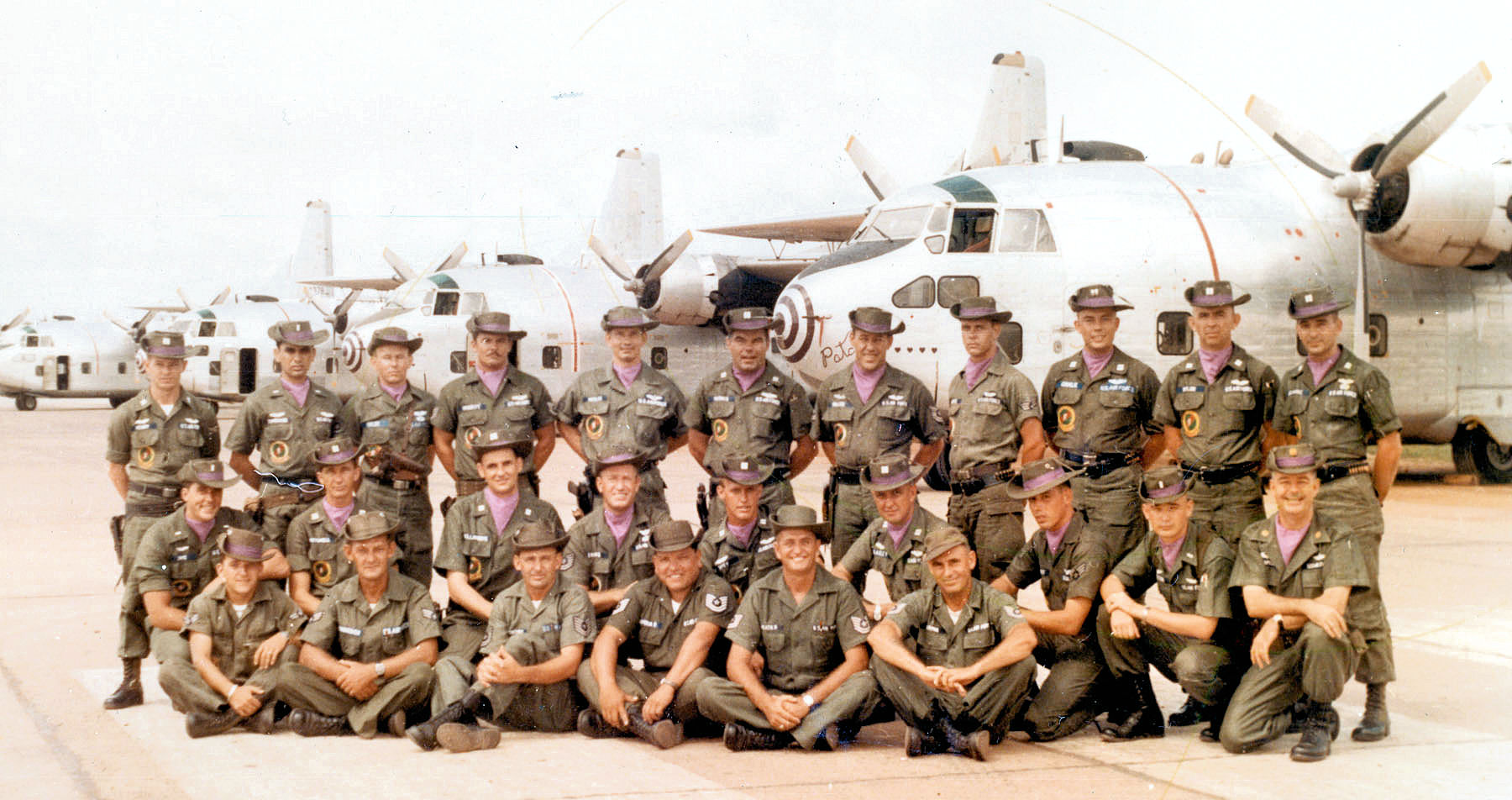
Members of Ranch Hand in 1964/5. The aircraft on the right is C-123 "Patches", now in the National Museum of the USAF

In October 1962, there began what became known as the Southeast Asia Airlift System. Requirements were forecast out to 25 days, and these requirements were matched against available resources. In September 1962 Headquarters 6492nd Combat Cargo Group (Troop Carrier) and the 6493rd Aerial Port Squadron were organized and attached to the 315th Air Division, based at Tachikawa AB. On 8 December 1962 the 315th Air Commando Group, (Troop Carrier) was activated replacing the 6492nd Combat Cargo Group and became responsible for all in-country airlift in South Vietnam, including control over all USAF airlift assets. On the same date the 8th Aerial Port Squadron replaced the 6493rd Aerial Port Squadron.The 315th Group was assigned to the 315th Air Division, but came under the operational control of MACV through the 2d Air Division.

On 10 August 1964 six Royal Australian Air Force RAAF Transport Flight Vietnam DHC-4 Caribous arrived at the base and were assigned to the airlift system.

In October 1964 the 19th Air Commando Squadron equipped with C-123s was established at the base and assigned to the 315th Troop Carrier Group.

On 8 March 1965 the 315th Troop Carrier Group was redesignated the 315th Air Commando Group. The 315th Air Commando Group was re-designated the 315th Air Commando Wing on 8 March 1966.

Squadrons of the 315th ACW/TC were:

- 12th Air Commando Squadron (Defoliation), 15 October 1966 – 30 September 1970 (Bien Hoa) (UC-123 Provider)
- Det 1, 834th Air Division, 15 October 1966 – 1 December 1971 (Tan Son Nhut) (C-130B Hercules)
- 19th Air Commando Squadron 8 March 1966 – 10 June 1971 (Tan Son Nhut) (C-123 Provider) (including 2 Royal Thai Air Force-operated C-123s named Victory Flight)
- 309th Air Commando Squadron 8 March 1966 – 31 July 1970 (Phan Rang) (C-123)
- 310th Air Commando Squadron 8 March 1966 – 15 January 1972 (Phan Rang) (C-123)
- 311th Air Commando Squadron 8 March 1966 – 5 October 1971 (Phan Rang) (C-123)
- Det 1., HQ 315th Air Commando Wing, Troop Carrier 1 August – 15 October 1966
- Det 5., HQ 315th Air Division (Combat Cargo) 8 March – 15 October 1966
- Det 6., HQ 315th Air Division (Combat Cargo) (8 March – 15 October 1966)
- 903rd Aeromedical Evacuation Squadron 8 July 1966
- RAAF Transport Flight, Vietnam (RTFV) 8 March – 15 October 1966

The unit also performed C-123 airlift operations in Vietnam. Operations included aerial movement of troops and cargo, flare drops, aeromedical evacuation, and air-drops of critical supplies and paratroops

==== Operation Ranch Hand ====
The 315th ACG was responsible for Operation Ranch Hand Defoliant operations missions. After some modifications to the aircraft (which included adding armor for the crew), three C-123B Provider aircraft arrived at the base on 7 January 1962 under the code name Ranch Hand.

The 315th ACW was transferred to Phan Rang Air Base on 14 June 1967.

=== 834th Air Division ===
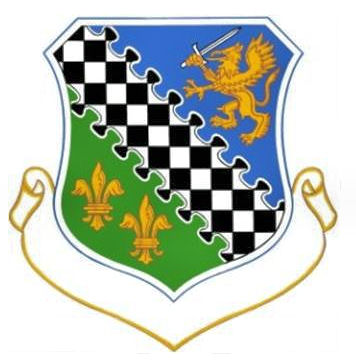

On 15 October 1966 the 834th Airlift Division was assigned without personnel or equipment, to Tan Son Nhut AB to join the Seventh Air Force, providing an intermediate command and control organization and also act as host unit for the USAF forces at the base.

The 315th Air Commando Wing and 8th Aerial Port Squadron were assigned to the 834th Division. Initially the 834th AD had a strength of twenty-seven officers and twenty-one airmen, all of whom were on permanent assignment to Tan Son Nhut.

The Air Division served as a single manager for all tactical airlift operations in South Vietnam, using air transport to haul cargo and troops, which were air-landed or air-dropped, as combat needs dictated, through December 1971. The 834th Air Division became the largest tactical airlift force in the world. In addition to airlift of cargo and personnel and RVNAF training, it took on Ranch Hand defoliation and insecticide spraying; psychological/propaganda leaflet distribution; helicopter landing zone preparation; airfield survey; the operation of aerial ports; and other special missions.

Units it directly controlled were:

- 315th Air Commando (later, 315th Special Operations; 315th Tactical Airlift) Wing: 15 October 1966 – 1 December 1971)

Located at: Tan Son Nhut AB; later Phan Rang AB (15 June 1967 – 1 December 1971) UC-123 Provider. Composed of four C-123 squadrons with augmentation by C-130 Hercules transports from the 315th Air Division, Tachikawa AB, Japan.

Two C-123 Squadrons (32 a/c) at Tan Son Nhut AB;
There were 23 C-130B aircraft assigned by 1 November 1966

- 483d Troop Carrier (later, 483d Tactical Airlift) Wing: 15 October 1966 – 1 December 1971
- 2d Aerial Port Group (Tan Son Nhut)

8th Aerial Port Squadron, Tan Son Nhut (16 detachments)

Detachments were located at various points where airlift activity warranted continuous but less extensive aerial port services. Aerial port personnel loaded, unloaded, and stored cargo and processed passengers at each location.

The Air Division also supervised South Vietnamese air transport operations (primarily C-47s), six DHC-4 Caribou transports operated by the No. 35 Squadron RAAF at Vung Tau Air Base and two Republic of Korea Air Force Curtiss C-46 Commando transport aircraft from 29 July 1967, later replaced by C-54s. The Air Division received the Presidential Unit Citation recognizing their efforts during the Battle of Khe Sanh.

In late 1969 C Flight, 17th Special Operations Squadron equipped with five AC-119G gunships was deployed at the base. By the end of 1970 this Flight would grow to nine AC-119Gs to support operations in Cambodia.

During its last few months, the 834th worked toward passing combat airlift control to Seventh Air Force. On 1 December 1971 the 834th AD was inactivated as part of the USAF withdrawal of forces from Vietnam.

=== 377th Air Base Wing ===
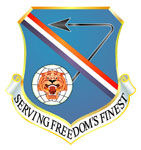

The 377th Air Base Wing was responsible for the day-to-day operations and maintenance of the USAF portion of the facility from April 1966 until the last USAF personnel withdrew from South Vietnam in March 1973. In addition, the 377th ABW was responsible for housing numerous tenant organizations including Seventh Air Force, base defense, and liaison with the RVNAF.

In 1972 inactivating USAF units throughout South Vietnam began to assign units without equipment or personnel to the 377th ABW.

From Cam Ranh AB:

- 21st Tactical Air Support Squadron: 15 March 1972 – 23 February 1973.

From Phan Rang AB:

- 8th Special Operations Squadron: 15 January – 25 October 1972 (A-37)
- 9th Special Operations Squadron: 21 January – 29 February 1972 (C-47)
- 310th Tactical Airlift Squadron: January–June 1972 and March–October 1972 (C-123, C-7B)
- 360th Tactical Electronic Warfare Squadron: 1 February – 24 November 1972 (EC-47N/P/Q)

All of these units were inactivated at Tan Son Nhut AB.

An operating location of the wing headquarters was established at Bien Hoa AB on 14 April 1972 to provide turnaround service for F-4 Phantom IIs of other organizations, mostly based in Thailand. It was replaced on 20 June 1972 by Detachment l of the 377th Wing headquarters, which continued the F-4 turnaround service and added A-7 Corsair IIs for the deployed 354th Tactical Fighter Wing aircraft based at Korat Royal Thai Air Force Base, Thailand on 30 October 1972. The detachment continued operations through 11 February 1973.

The 377th ABW phased down for inactivation during February and March 1973, transferring many assets to the RVNAF. When inactivated on 28 March 1973, the 377th Air Base Wing was the last USAF unit in South Vietnam.

== Post-1975 Vietnam People's Air Force use ==
Following the war, Tan Son Nhut Air Base was taken over as a base for the VPAF which is referred to by the name Tân Sơn Nhất.

Tân Sơn Nhất Air Base was home of 917th Mixed Air Transport Regiment (a.k.a. Đồng Tháp Squadron) of 370th Air Force Division. The regiment's fleet consisted of:

- Bell UH-1 Iroquois
- Mil Mi-8
- Mil Mi-17

917th Mixed Air Transport Regiment was moved to Cần Thơ International Airport in 2017. Only air defense and logistics units remained at the airport today.

In November 2015, the site of Camp Davis was recognized as a national historical relic by the Monuments Conservation Center of Ho Chi Minh City Department of Culture and Sports and the Ho Chi Minh City Monuments Review Board.

== Accident and incidents ==
- 25 October 1967: F-105D Thunderchief #59-1737 crashed into a C-123K #54-0667 on landing in bad weather. The F-105 pilot was killed and both aircraft were destroyed.
- 19 June 1968 at 14:15 a pallet of ammunition exploded on a truck in the munitions area north of the base killing one U.S. soldier. An ambulance crossing the runway to the scene of the explosion was hit by a U.S. Army U-21 on takeoff killing two USAF medics in the ambulance.
- 11 October 1969: an AC-119G of the 17th Special Operations Squadron crashed shortly after takeoff. Six crewmembers were killed and the aircraft was destroyed.
- 28 April 1970: an AC-119G of the 17th Special Operations Squadron crashed shortly after takeoff. Six crewmembers were killed and the aircraft was destroyed.

== Other sources ==
- Endicott, Judy G. (1999) Active Air Force wings as of 1 October 1995; USAF active flying, space, and missile squadrons as of 1 October 1995. Maxwell AFB, Alabama: Office of Air Force History. CD-ROM.
- Martin, Patrick (1994). Tail Code: The Complete History of USAF Tactical Aircraft Tail Code Markings. Schiffer Military Aviation History. ISBN 0-88740-513-4.
- Mesco, Jim (1987) VNAF Republic of Vietnam Air Force 1945–1975 Squadron/Signal Publications. ISBN 0-89747-193-8
- Mikesh, Robert C. (2005) Flying Dragons: The Republic of Vietnam Air Force. Schiffer Publishing, Ltd. ISBN 0-7643-2158-7
- USAF Historical Research Division/Organizational History Branch – 35th Fighter Wing, 366th Wing
- VNAF – The Republic of Vietnam Air Force 1951–1975
- USAAS-USAAC-USAAF-USAF Aircraft Serial Numbers—1908 to present
