= 1964th Communications Group =

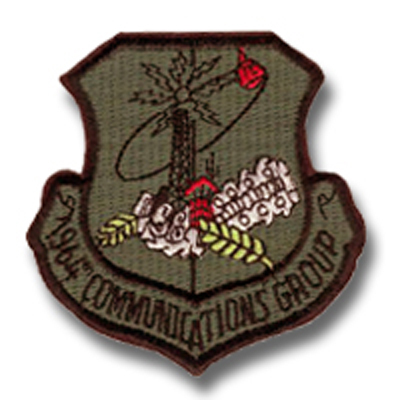
Group patch from when the unit was in Germany

The 1964th Communications Group of the United States Air Force was a highly decorated communications group with service in the Vietnam War and then in Europe.

The Group traced its history to the designation and organization of the 1964th Communications Squadron at Tan Son Nhut Airfield (later, Tan Son Nhut Air Base), South Vietnam, on 1 May 1962, in accordance with AFCS G-23 instructions of 29 March 1962. It was assigned to the Southeast Asia Communications Region (itself part of the Pacific Communications Area), Air Force Communications Service. It was upgraded to Group status on 1 October 1962 and appears to have directed about 10 squadrons in the Republic of Vietnam. It provided communications and navaids for Air Force fixed bases in the country. The group commander also served as the Seventh Air Force director for communications-electronic and as the Southeast Asia Communications Region deputy commander for mainland Southeast Asia.

On 28 March 1973 the group moved without personnel or equipment (WOPE) to Ramstein Air Base, West Germany, and was reassigned to the European Communications Area (AFCS MO-2, 15 March 1973). The European Communications Area later became the European Communications Division; European Information Systems Division; and then the European Communications Division.

In 1984 it became an Information Systems Group. On 1 November 1986 it was redesignated (back) to the 1964th Communications Group (AFCC SO G-O7, 21 October 1986).

By the late 1980s in Germany the group's missions appear to have included telephone, teletype, microwave, cryptographic/dighal subscriber terminal element, secure voice communications, long range navigation, maintenance, and operations within the Federal Republic of Germany.

Roughly at the time of Air Force Communications Command's demise in May 1993, Fletcher's Air Bases, Volume II still listed the group as functioning and located at Ramstein Air Base.

It was redesignated the 86th Communications Group under the 86th Fighter Wing.

On 1 Sep 2004 the USAFE Air and Space Communications Group was inactivated and the inactive 86th Communications Group was redesignated and reactivated as the 86th Air and Space Communications Group with three squadrons: 1st Air and Space Communications Operations Squadron, 1st Combat Communications Squadron, and 1st Communications Maintenance Squadron.

On 16 Jul 2009 the group was inactivated and those squadrons were transferred to the 435th Air and Space Communications Group when the 435th Air Ground Operations Wing was activated.

== Assignments ==
- Southeast Asia Communications Region, 1962
- European Communications Area (later European Communications Division; European Information Systems Division; and then the European Communications Division), 28 March 1973

After the major reorganization of Air Force Communications Command the group may have been assigned to the United States Air Forces in Europe, after 1991.

- 86th Fighter Wing or 86th Wing, later 86th Airlift Wing

== Components ==
- 1876th Communications Squadron designated and organized at Tan Son Nhut Airfield (later, Tan Son Nhut AB), South Vietnam, on 1 November 1965; reassigned on 1 April 1972, and moved to USAF Academy, Colorado (Miller 52).
- 1878th Communications Squadron designated/organized at Pleiku Airport (later AB), South Vietnam, 1 November 1965 (AFCS G-103, 3 August 1965); reassigned 1 January 1972 and moved to Little Rock AFB, Arkansas
- 1879th Communications Squadron, Nha Trang, 1 November 1965; reassigned 1 September 1971 and moved to Richards-Gebaur AFB, Missouri
- The 1881st Communications Squadron designated and organized at Cam Ranh Bay AB, South Vietnam, 15 August 1965; reassigned 31 May 1972 and location changed to Hill Air Force Base, Utah
- 1882d Communications Squadron designated and organized at Phan Rang, South Vietnam, 1 November 1965; reassigned 1 November 1971 and moved to Bergstrom AFB, Texas;
- 1883d Communications Squadron designated and organized at Qui Nhon Airfield, South Vietnam, 1 November 1965; moved to Phu Cat Air Base, 1 April 1967; reassigned 30 November 1971 and moved to Kincheloe Air Force Base, Michigan
- 1965th Communications Squadron, designated and organized at Don Muang Airport, Thailand, 1 October 1964, and assigned to 1964 CG; reassigned 1 November 1965 to the 1974th Communications Group
- 1972d Communications Squadron designated and organized at Da Nang Airport, South Vietnam, 20 August 1965 (AFCS G-73, 18 May 1965, amended by G-105, 4 August 1965); reassigned 13 March 1973 and moved to Eglin Air Force Base, Florida
- 86th Communications Squadron, 1 Jul 1994-15 Jan 2004
- 1st Air and Space Communications Operations Squadron, 1 Sep 2004 - 16 Jul 2009
- 1st Combat Communications Squadron, 1 Sep 2004 - 16 Jul 2009
- 1st Communications Maintenance Squadron, 1 Sep 2004 - 16 Jul 2009

== Awards and decorations ==
- Air Force Outstanding Unit Awards:
  - with Valor 1 July 1969 - 30 June 1970
  - with Valor 1 July 1970 - 30 June 1971
  - with Valor 1 July 1971 - 30 June 1972
  - with Valor 1 July 1972 - 3/27/1973
  - 1 Jan 1976 - 31 Dec 1976
  - 1 Jan 1981 - 31 Dec 1982
  - 1 Aug 1988 - 31 July 1990

- Republic of Vietnam Cross of Gallantry with Palm, 4/01/1966 - 1/28/1973
