= List of United States Air Force special operations squadrons =

This is a list of United States Air Force special operations squadrons. It covers aerial units assigned to Air Force Special Operations Command in the United States Air Force.

== Special Operations Squadrons ==
| Squadron | Shield | Location | Nickname | Aircraft | Notes |
|---|---|---|---|---|---|
| 1st Special Operations Squadron | | Kadena AB | | MC-130J Commando II | Switching to Commando II in 2020 |
| 2d Special Operations Squadron | | Hurlburt Field | | MQ-9 Reaper | 1 March 2009 |
| 3d Special Operations Squadron | | Cannon AFB | "Dragons" | MQ-9 Reaper | |
| 4th Special Operations Squadron | | Hurlburt Field | "Ghost Riders" | AC-130U Spooky | |
| 5th Special Operations Squadron | | Hurlburt Field | | U-28A | |
| 6th Special Operations Squadron | | Hurlburt Field | | UH-1H, UH-1N, Mil Mi-8, Mil Mi-17 | |
| 7th Special Operations Squadron | | RAF Mildenhall | "Air Commandos" | MC-130J Commando II | |
| 8th Special Operations Squadron | | Hurlburt Field | "Black Birds" | CV-22 Osprey | |
| 9th Special Operations Squadron | | Cannon AFB | "Night Wings" | MC-130J Commando II | |
| 12th Special Operations Squadron^{1} | | Tan Son Nhut Airport, Bien Hoa Air Base, Phan Rang Air Base | "Ranch Hand" | UC-123B, UC-123K | |
| 12th Special Operations Squadron^{2} | | Cannon Air Force Base, New Mexico | | General Atomics MQ-1 Predator, General Atomics MQ-9 Reaper | |
| 15th Special Operations Squadron | | Hurlburt Field | "Global Eagles" | MC-130H Combat Talon II | |
| 16th Special Operations Squadron | | Cannon AFB | "Spectre" | AC-130H SpectreAC-130W | |
| 17th Special Operations Squadron | | Kadena AB | "Shadow" | MC-130J Commando II | Inactivated in 2020 |
| 18th Special Operations Squadron | | Phan Rang AB | | AC-119K Stinger | 31 December 1972 |
| 19th Special Operations Squadron | | Hurlburt Field | | AC-130, MC-130, U-28A | |
| 20th Special Operations Squadron | | Cannon AFB | "Green Hornets" | | |
| 21st Special Operations Squadron | | Yokota AB | "Dust Devils" | CV-22 Osprey | 9 October 2007 |
| 22d Special Operations Squadron | | Nahkon Phanom RTAFB | "Zorro" | A-1E/G/H/J Skyraider | 1970 |
| 31st Special Operations Squadron | | Osan AB | | MH-53 Pave Low | 31 August 2001 |
| 33d Special Operations Squadron | | Cannon AFB | | MQ-9 Reaper | |
| 34th Special Operations Squadron | | Hurlburt Field | | U-28A | |
| 55th Special Operations Squadron | | Hurlburt Field | "Night Hawks" | MH-60G Pave Hawk | 16 September 1999 |
| 67th Special Operations Squadron | | RAF Mildenhall | "Night Owls" | MC-130J Commando II | |
| 71st Special Operations Squadron | | Kirtland AFB | | CV-22 Osprey | |
| 73d Special Operations Squadron | | Hurlburt Field | "Ghostrider" | AC-130J | |
| 90th Special Operations Squadron | | Nha Trang AB | | | 8 July 1973 |
| 193d Special Operations Squadron | | Pennsylvania ANG | "Quiet Professionals" | EC-130J Commando Solo | |
| 309th Special Operations Squadron | | Phan Rang AB | | C-123B/K | |
| 310th Special Operations Squadron | | Phan Rang AB | | C-123B/K | |
| 311th Special Operations Squadron | | Phan Rang AB | | C-123B/K | |
| 318th Special Operations Squadron | | Cannon AFB | | PC-12 | |
| 319th Special Operations Squadron | | Hurlburt Field | | U-28A | |
| 415th Special Operations Squadron | | Kirtland AFB | | MC-130J Commando II, HC-130J Combat King II | Training Squadron |
| 427th Special Operations Squadron | | Pope Air Force Base | | | |
| 512th Special Operations Squadron | | Kirtland AFB | | UH-1N Twin Huey, HH-60 Pave Hawk | 6 October 2000 |
| 522d Special Operations Squadron | | Cannon AFB | "Fireballs" | MC-130J Commando II | Inactivated in 2014 |
| 524th Special Operations Squadron | | Cannon AFB | "Hounds" | | 6 October 2009 |
| 550th Special Operations Squadron | | Kirtland AFB | "Wolfpack" | HC-130 King Bird, MC-130H Combat Talon II, MC-130P Combat Shadow | Inactive |
| 551st Special Operations Squadron | | Cannon AFB | | AC-130H, MC-130W | 15 Jun 2021 |
| 602d Special Operations Squadron | | Nahkon Phanom RTAFB | | A-1E/G/H/J Skyraider | 1970 |
| 606th Special Operations Squadron | | Nahkon Phanom RTAFB | | C-123 Provider, U-10 | 15 June 1971 |
| 609th Special Operations Squadron | | Nahkon Phanom RTAFB | | A-1E/G/H/J Skyraider | 1 December 1969 |
| 711th Special Operations Squadron | | Duke Field | | MC-130E Combat Talon I | |
| 745th Special Operations Squadron | | Hurlburt Field | | RC-26 | Provisional ANG unit |

== See also ==
- List of United States Air Force squadrons
- List of United States Air Force special tactics squadrons
