= 22nd Training Squadron =

US Air Force unit

22nd Training Squadron

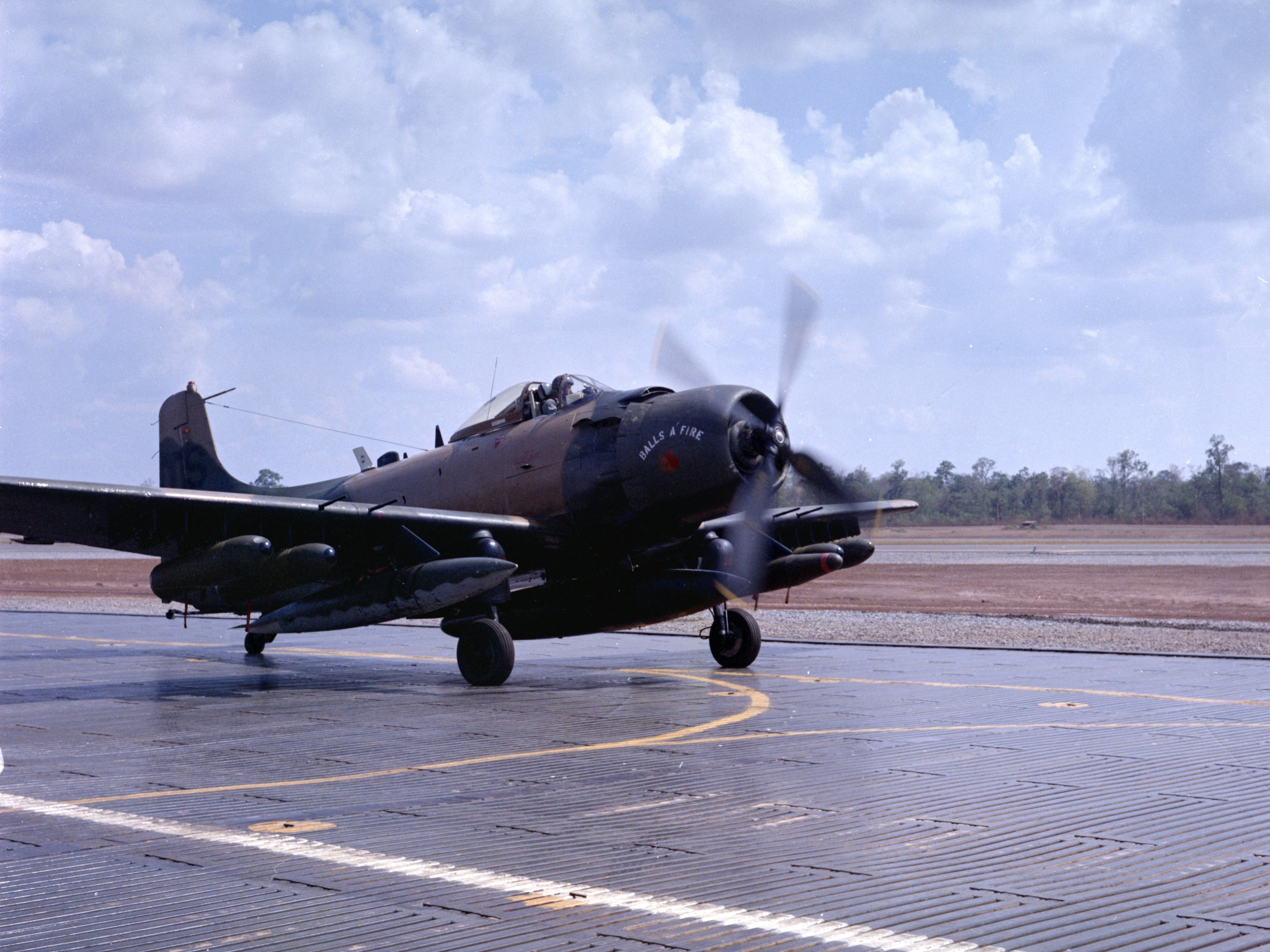
- A-1H Skyraider of the 22nd SOS at Nakhon Phanom Royal Thai Air Force Base, 1970
- Active: 1968–1970; 1971–present
- Country: United States
- Branch: United States Air Force
- Role: SERE training
- Part of: Air Education and Training Command
- Garrison/HQ: Fairchild Air Force Base
- Engagements: Viet Nam War
- Decorations: Presidential Unit Citation; Air Force Outstanding Unit Award with combat "V" Device

Insignia
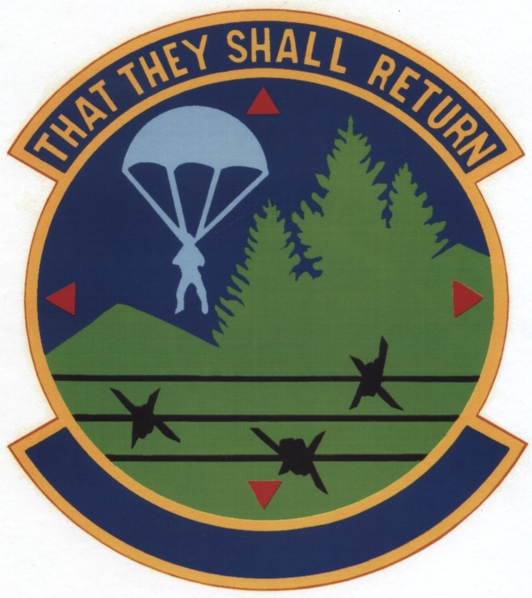
- 22nd Training Squadron emblem
- TS: Squadron A-1 Tail Code

The 22nd Training Squadron is a United States Air Force unit stationed at Fairchild Air Force Base, Washington. Its mission is Survival, Evasion, Resistance and Escape training. The squadron is assigned to the 336th Training Group of Air Education and Training Command.

== History ==
The squadron was first organized as the 22nd Special Operations Squadron and operated in Southeast Asia during the Vietnam War for two years from October 1968 until September 1970. The 22nd flew Douglas A-1 Skyraiders and was assigned to the 56th Special Operations Wing at Nakhon Phanom Royal Thai Air Force Base.

The primary call sign used by the unit was "Zorro", for interdiction missions over the Ho Chi Minh trail, and the squadron was thus nicknamed the "Zorros." (The 606th Air Commando Squadron also used the "Zorro" call sign for a period of time prior to the establishment of the 22nd for its missions over the Trail flying North American T-28 Trojan fighter bombers).

The 3612th Combat Crew Training Squadron was organized in 1971 and assigned to the 3636th Combat Crew Training Group at Fairchild Air Force Base, Washington. In 1993, the two squadrons were consolidated as the 22nd Crew Training Squadron. The squadron conducts Survival, Evasion, Resistance and Escape training.

== Lineage ==
22nd Special Operations Squadron

- Constituted as the 22nd Special Operations Squadron on 8 October 1968 and activated (not organized)
- Organized on 25 October 1968

Inactivated on 30 September 1970

- Consolidated on 1 January 1993 with the 3612th Combat Crew Training Squadron as the 22nd Crew Training Squadron

22nd Training Squadron

- Organized on 1 April 1971 as the 3612th Combat Crew Training Squadron
- Consolidated on 1 January 1993 with the 22nd Special Operations Squadron as the 22nd Crew Training Squadron

Recesignated 22nd Training Squadron on 1 April 1994

=== Assignments ===
- Pacific Air Forces, 8 October 1968 (not organized)
- Thirteenth Air Force, 25 October 1968
- 56th Special Operations Wing, 31 October 1968 – 30 September 1970
- 3636th Combat Crew Training Group (later 336th Crew Training Group, 336th Training Group), 1 April 1971 – present

=== Stations ===
- Nakon Phanom Royal Thai Air Force Base, Thailand, 25 October 1968 – 30 September 1970
- Fairchild Air Force Base, Washington, 1 April 1971 – present

=== Aircraft ===
- Douglas A-1 Skyraider, 1968–1970

== See also ==
- List of United States Air Force squadrons
- List of United States Air Force special operations squadrons
- List of A-1 Skyraider operators
