= 56th Fighter Wing =

US Air Force wing

56th Fighter Wing

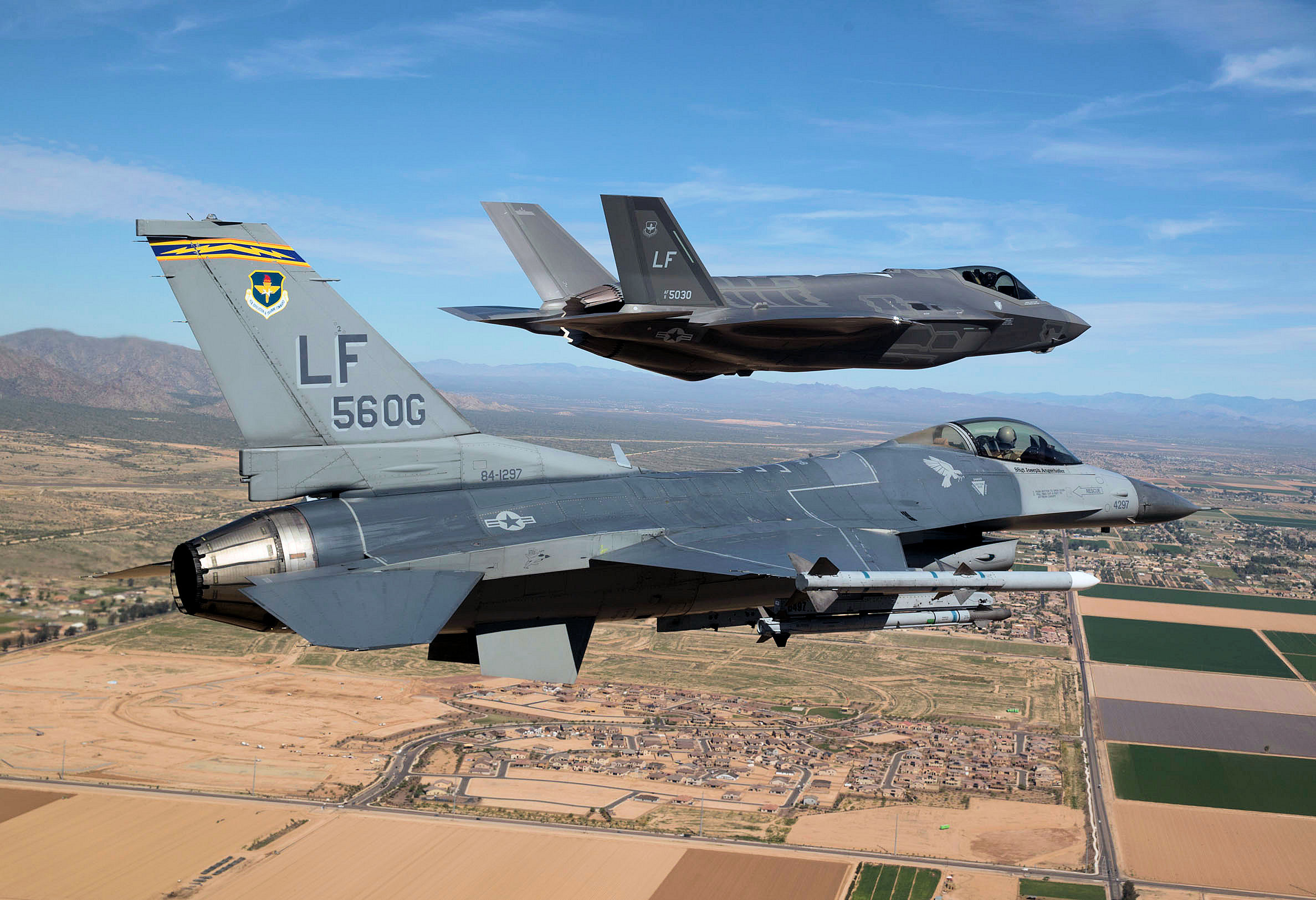
- F-16 Fighting Falcon with the wing's first F-35 Lightning II
- Active: 1947–1952; 1961–1964; 1967–present
- Country: United States
- Branch: United States Air Force
- Role: Fighter Training
- Part of: Air Combat Command
- Garrison/HQ: Luke Air Force Base
- Nickname: Thunderbolts
- Motto: Cave Tonitrum Latin Beware of the Thunderbolt
- Decorations: Presidential Unit Citation; Air Force Outstanding Unit Award with Combat "V" Device; Air Force Outstanding Unit Award; Republic of Vietnam Gallantry Cross w/ Palm

Commanders
- Current commander: Col. Nicholas Ihde
- Deputy Commander: Col. John D. Ryan
- Command Chief: CMSgt Nathan Chrestensen
- Notable commanders: Philip Breedlove; Ronald Fogleman; Joseph Ralston; Robin Rand; Carrol Chandler; Perry J. Dahl; Henry Viccellio Jr.

Insignia
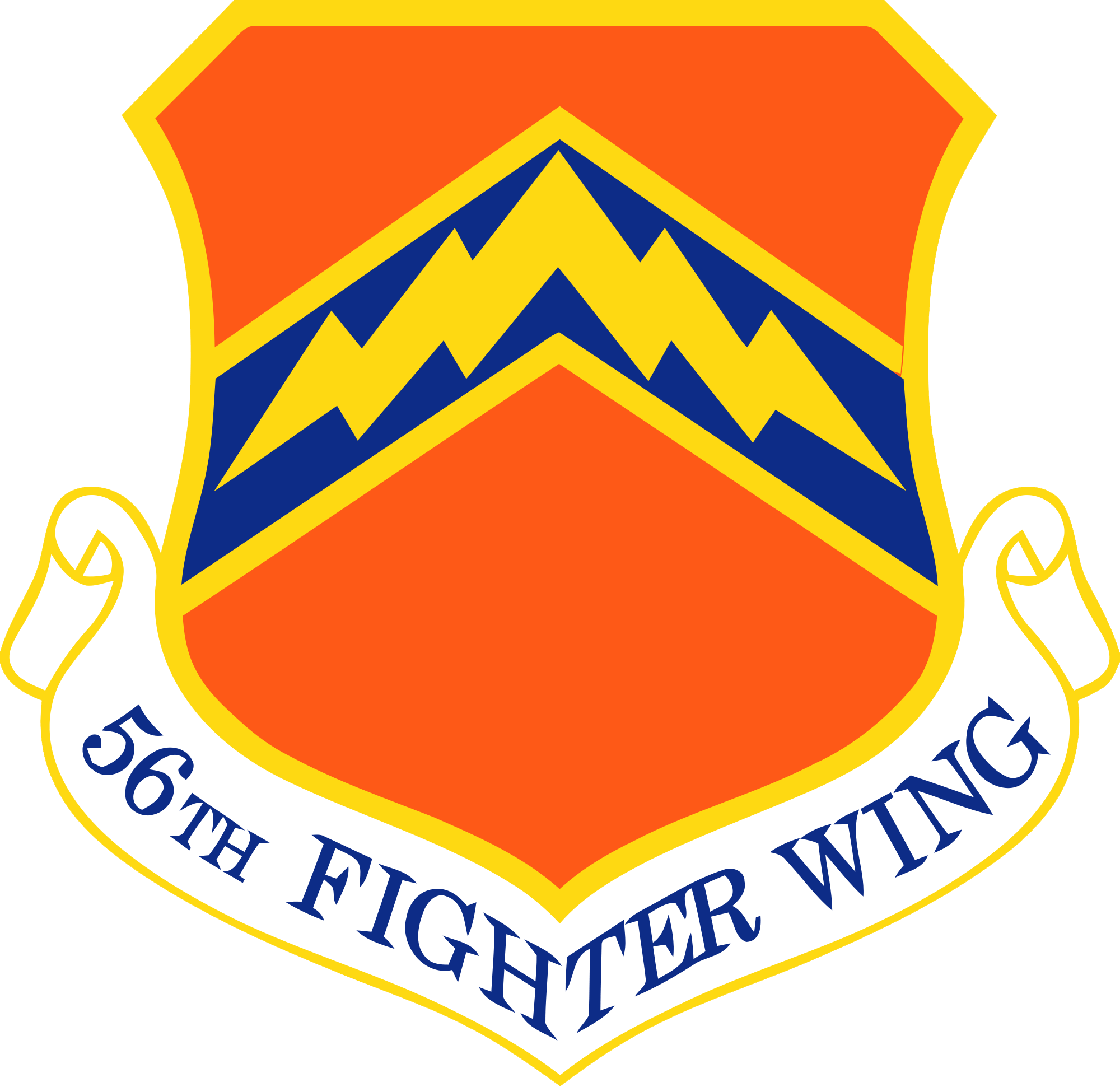
- 56th Fighter Wing emblem (approved 19 April 1967)
- Tail code at Luke AFB: LF

The 56th Fighter Wing is a fighter wing in the United States Air Force. It is the world's largest Lockheed Martin F-35 Lightning II wing and one of two Air Force F-35 training locations. Additionally, it is one of two active-duty F-16 training bases. The 56th graduates dozens of F-35 and General Dynamics F-16 Fighting Falcon pilots and 300 air control professionals annually.

Additionally, the 56th Fighter Wing oversees the Gila Bend Air Force Auxiliary Field and the Barry M. Goldwater Range, a military training range spanning more than 1.7 million acres of Sonoran Desert.

== History ==
=== Initial activation ===
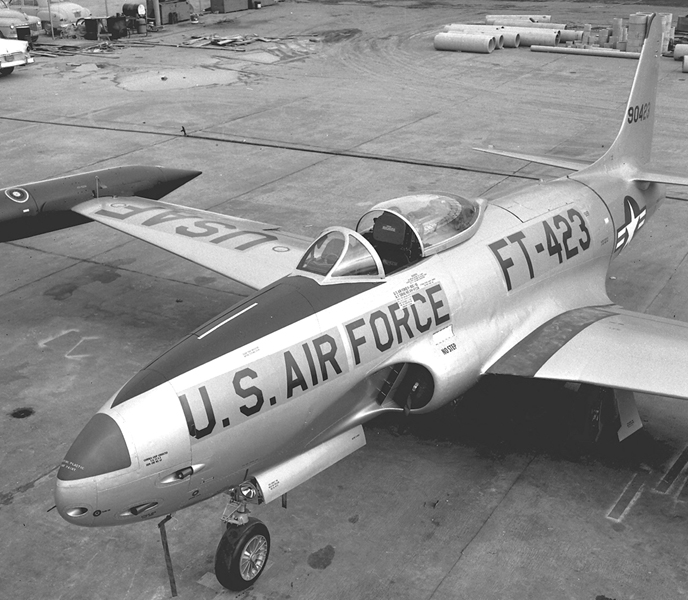
Lockheed F-80

The 56th Fighter Wing was activated 15 August 1947 at Selfridge Field, Michigan as part of the United States Air Force's experimental wing base reorganization, in which combat groups and all supporting units on a base were assigned to a single wing. The 56th Fighter Group, flying Lockheed P-80 Shooting Stars, became its operational component. The wing base organization was made permanent in 1948.

In July and August 1948, the wing pioneered the first west-to-east jet fighter transatlantic crossing along the northern air route from the United States to Europe, flying 16 of its F-80's from Selfridge to Fürstenfeldbruck Air Base, Germany, by way of Maine Labrador, Greenland, Iceland and Scotland.

=== Air Defense Command ===
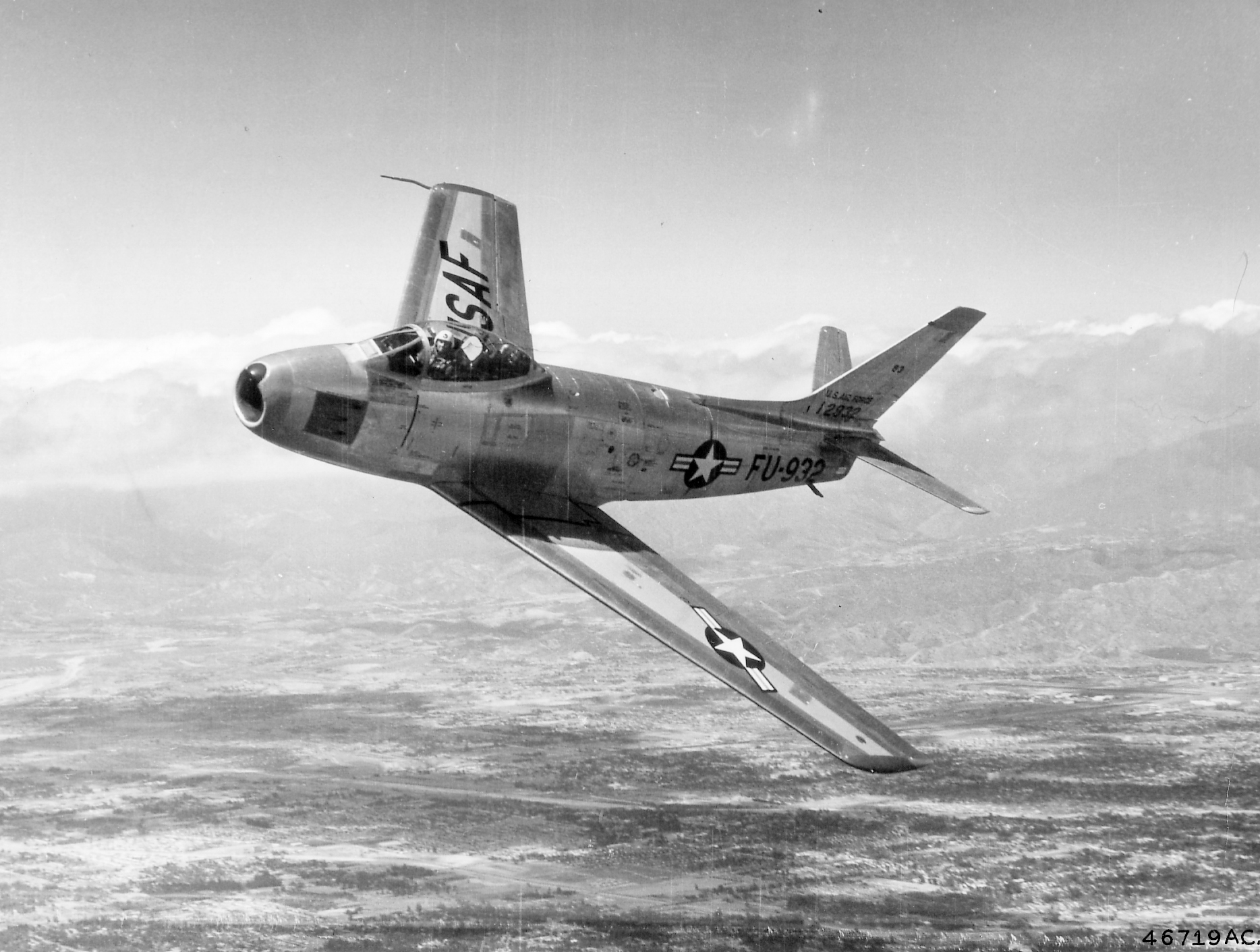
North American F-86F Sabre jet

The wing's mission included the air defense of a large portion of the United States. As this mission became more important, the 56th was transferred from Strategic Air Command (SAC) to Continental Air Command in December 1948, and then to the newly reformed Air Defense Command (ADC) on 1 December 1950. This mission was emphasized when the unit was redesignated 56th Fighter-Interceptor Wing in January 1950. It converted to the North American F-86 Sabre later that year. In a major ADC reorganization, to respond to the command's difficulties under the existing wing base organizational structure in deploying fighter squadrons to best advantage, the 56th was inactivated along with its 56th Fighter-Interceptor Group on 6 February 1952. Its operational squadrons were transferred to the recently organized 4708th Defense Wing.

Almost nine years later the wing was reactivated at K. I. Sawyer Air Force Base, Michigan, where it replaced the 56th Fighter Group as Sawyer began to grow in size as SAC's 4042d Strategic Wing began to add combat elements, requiring a larger support base. The wing once again had air defense mission. The wing controlled a single tactical unit, the 62d Fighter-Interceptor Squadron, flying the McDonnell F-101 Voodoo, which was capable of carrying the nuclear armed AIR-2 Genie. At the time the wing was activated, it maintained two aircraft on five minute alert status. In February 1962, in addition to these two interceptors, one third of the wing's aircraft were placed on fifteen minute alert.

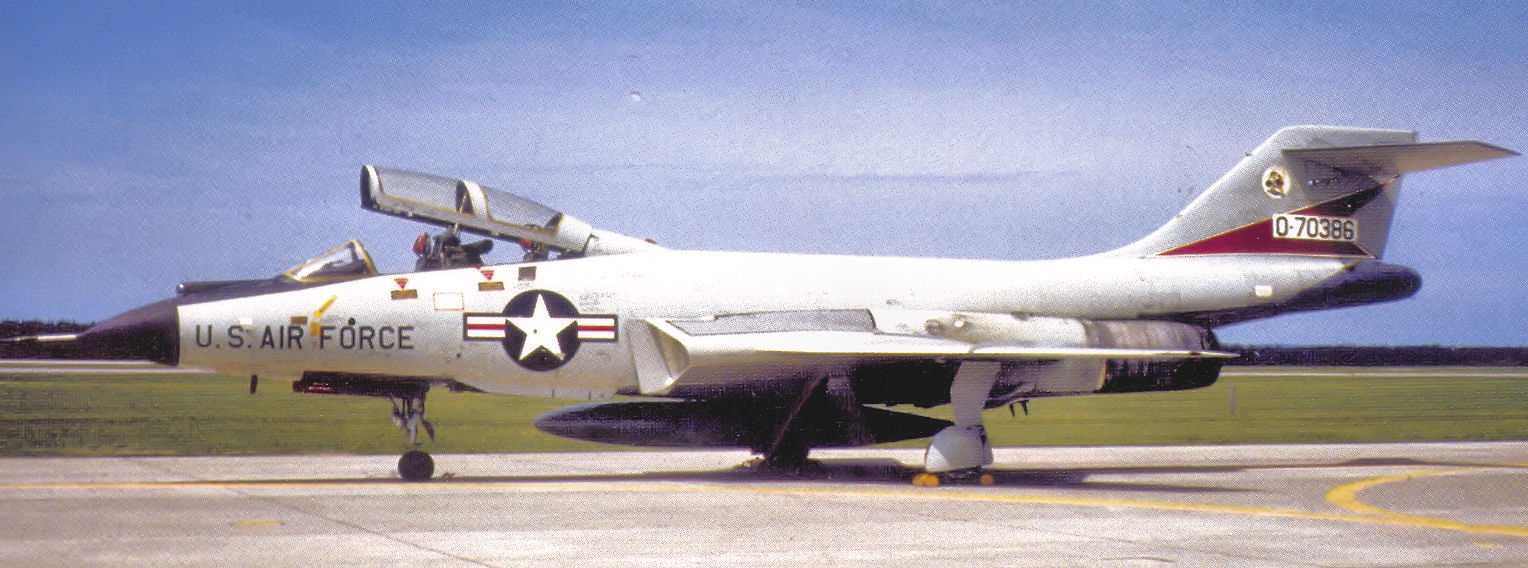
62d FIS F-101B (Note: Aircraft is McDonnell F-101B-95-MC Voodoo serial 57-386 at K.I. Sawyer AFB.)

On 22 October 1962, at the beginning of the Cuban Missile Crisis, when President Kennedy announced the presence of Soviet intermediate-range ballistic missiles in Cuba. Continental Air Defense Command (CONAD) directed the dispersal of interceptors within the United States. The dispersal plan called for Hector Field, North Dakota to be the wing's dispersal base, but ADC's dispersal plan was incomplete and Phelps Collins Field, Michigan became the wing's "interim" dispersal base. The wing sent one third of its aircraft there. All wing aircraft, including those at home and those at Phelps Collins were armed and placed on fifteen minute alert status. The increased alert posture was maintained through mid-November, when CONAD returned the wing to its normal alert status.

The wing was assigned to the Sault Sainte Marie Air Defense Sector until October 1963 when it became part of the Duluth Air Defense Sector. It participated in many ADC exercises, tactical evaluations and other air defense operations. Although the number of ADC interceptor squadrons remained almost constant in the early 1960s, attrition (and the fact that production lines closed in 1961) caused a gradual drop in the number of planes assigned to a squadron, from 24 to typically 18 by 1964. These reductions made it apparent that the primary mission of K.I. Sawyer would be to support SAC. In preparation for K.I. Sawyer becoming a SAC base, the wing's single tactical squadron transferred to the Duluth Air Defense Sector on 16 December 1963, and on 1 January 1964, the wing was transferred to SAC, which inactivated it and transferred its support elements to the 410th Bombardment Wing, which became the base's new host.

=== Vietnam War ===
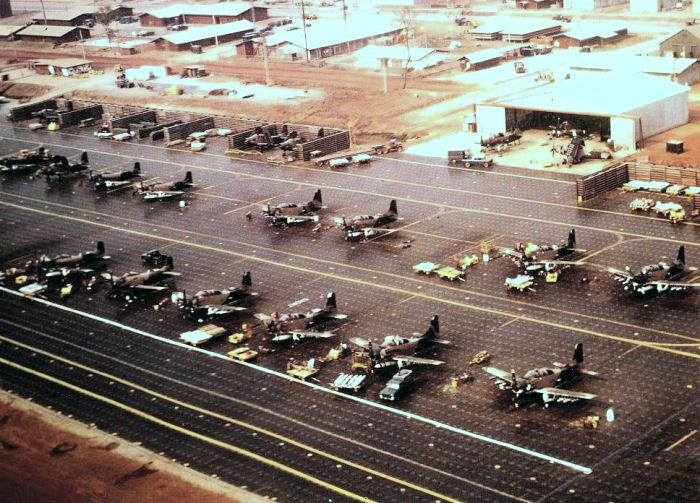
Douglas Skyraiders of the 1st and 602nd Squadrons at Nakhon Phanom

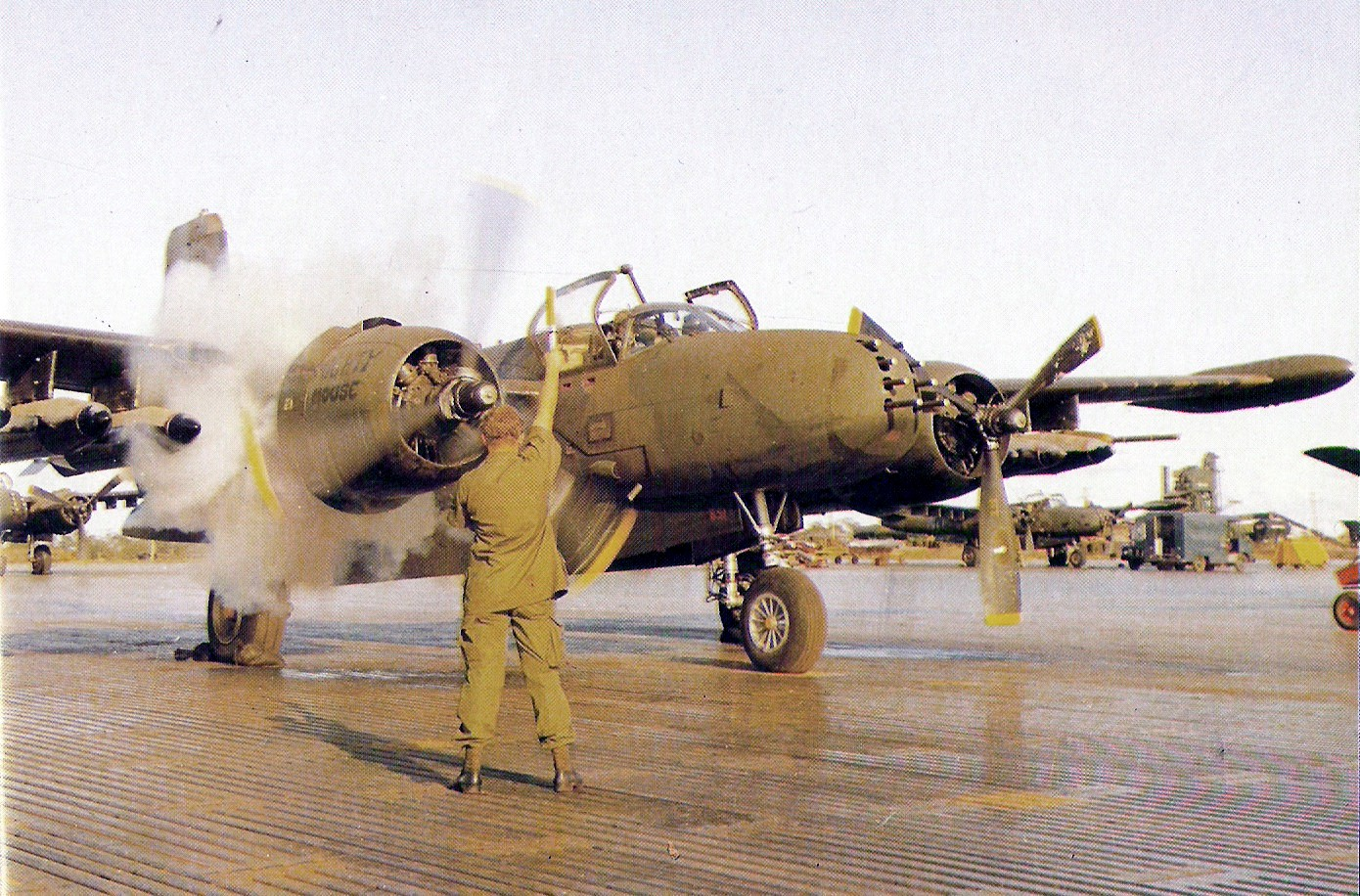
B-26K of the 609th Squadron

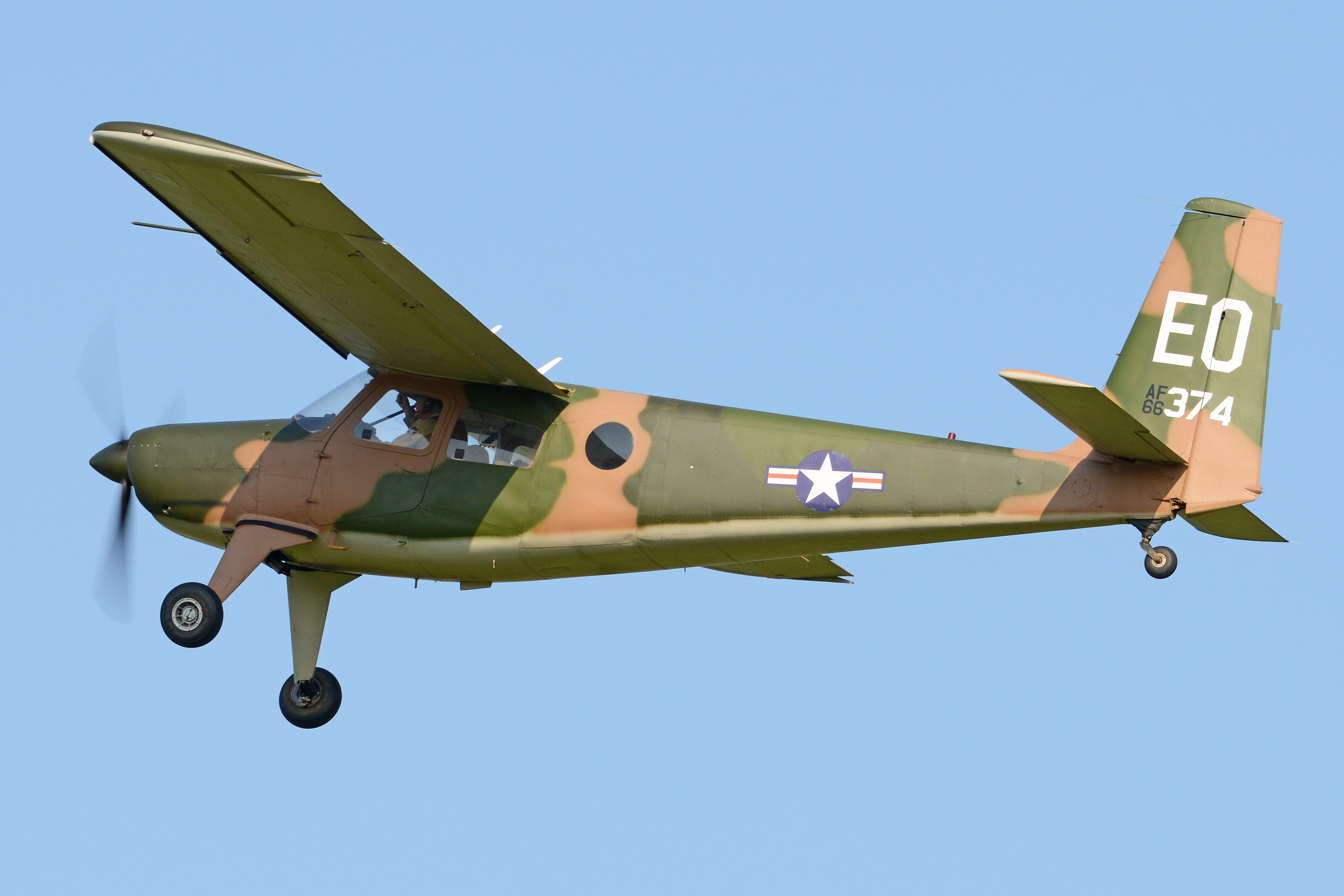
Helio U-10

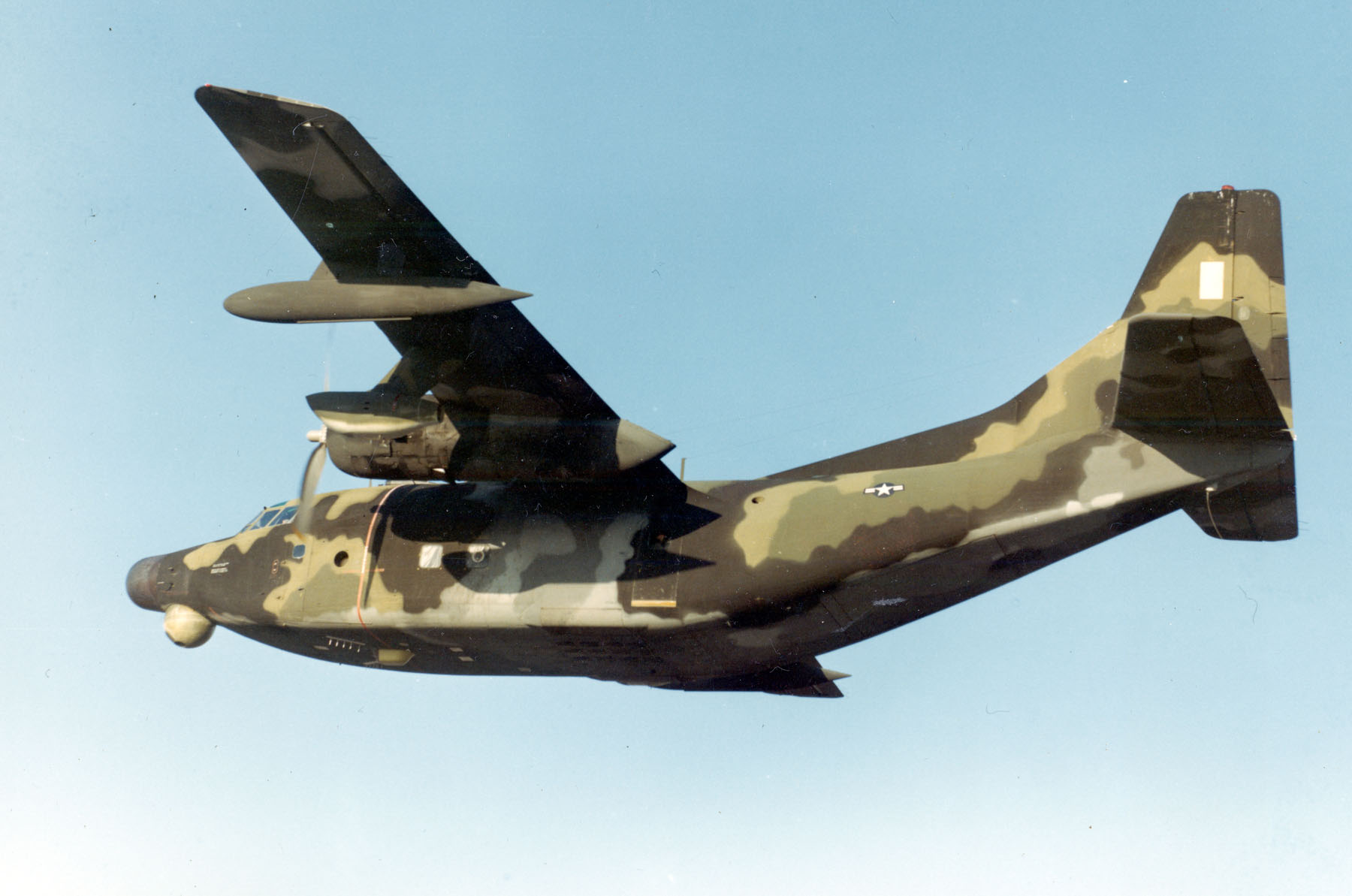
NC-123K

The wing was renamed the 56th Air Commando Wing and activated at Nakhon Phanom Royal Thai Air Force Base, (Note: The base was commonly referred to by its identifier, "NKP", or informally as "Naked Fanny.") Thailand in April 1967, replacing the 634th Combat Support Group as the mission there expanded. It was assigned the 606th Air Commando Squadron, a composite unit flying Helio U-10 Couriers, Fairchild C-123 Providers, Douglas A-26 Invader and North American T-28 Trojans, and the 602d Fighter Squadron flying Douglas A-1 Skyraiders at Udorn Royal Thai Air Force Base, Thailand. The wing continued to grow, adding the 609th Air Commando Squadron, which took over the T-28s and A-26s of the 606th, the 21st Helicopter Squadron, which was activated in November with Sikorsky CH-3 helicopters and the 1st Air Commando Squadron, another Skyraider squadron, which moved to Nakhon Phanom from Pleiku Air Base, South Vietnam in late December. The wing was assigned to Thirteenth Air Force, but was attached Seventh Air Force in Saigon for operational control.

The wing entered combat in Southeast Asia as soon as it was activated. It employed a wide variety of aircraft to meet specialized missions. Those missions included interdiction, psychological warfare, close air support, search and rescue, forward air control, training Royal Thai Air Force and Royal Lao Air Force personnel, and helicopter escort for clandestine insertion and extraction of personnel in Laos and North Vietnam.

The Battle of Lima Site 85 began in January 1968 and continued through March. The wing provided close air support for the defending forces. While this battle was continuing in Laos, the Siege of Khe Sanh, just across the border in South Vietnam, began in February. The wing continued to support the defenses of both sites through the end of the battles in April 1968. In the middle of 1968, the wing became the 56th Special Operations Wing and its various air commando, fighter and helicopter squadrons became special operations squadrons at the same time. Operations at Nakhon Phanom continued to expand as the 602d Squadron moved from Udorn in June and a third squadron of A-1s, the 22d Special Operations Squadron, was activated in October 1968.

By late 1969, attrition had reduced the number of A-26 Invaders in the 609th Special Operations Squadron. The squadron was inactivated in December and the remaining planes were returned to the United States.

Wing elements participated in the Operation Ivory Coast, the Son Tay Prison raid on 21 November 1970. The wing continued combat operations until 1973, ending operations in Vietnam in mid-January 1973, in Laos on 22, and in Cambodia on 15 1973. However, after combat operations ended, the wing continued to provide support services at Nakorn Phanom.

Although no longer assigned combat units, the 56th assisted in Operation Eagle Pull, the evacuation of Phnom Penh on 12 April 1975 and Operation Frequent Wind, the evacuation of Saigon on 29 and 30 April 1975. During the Mayagüez incident on 15 May 1975, it provided forward air control and helicopter insertion/extraction support. On 30 June 1975, the wing transferred its assets to the 656th Special Operations Wing and moved on paper to MacDill Air Force Base, where it replaced the 1st Tactical Fighter Wing, assuming its mission, personnel and equipment.

=== Tactical fighter operations ===
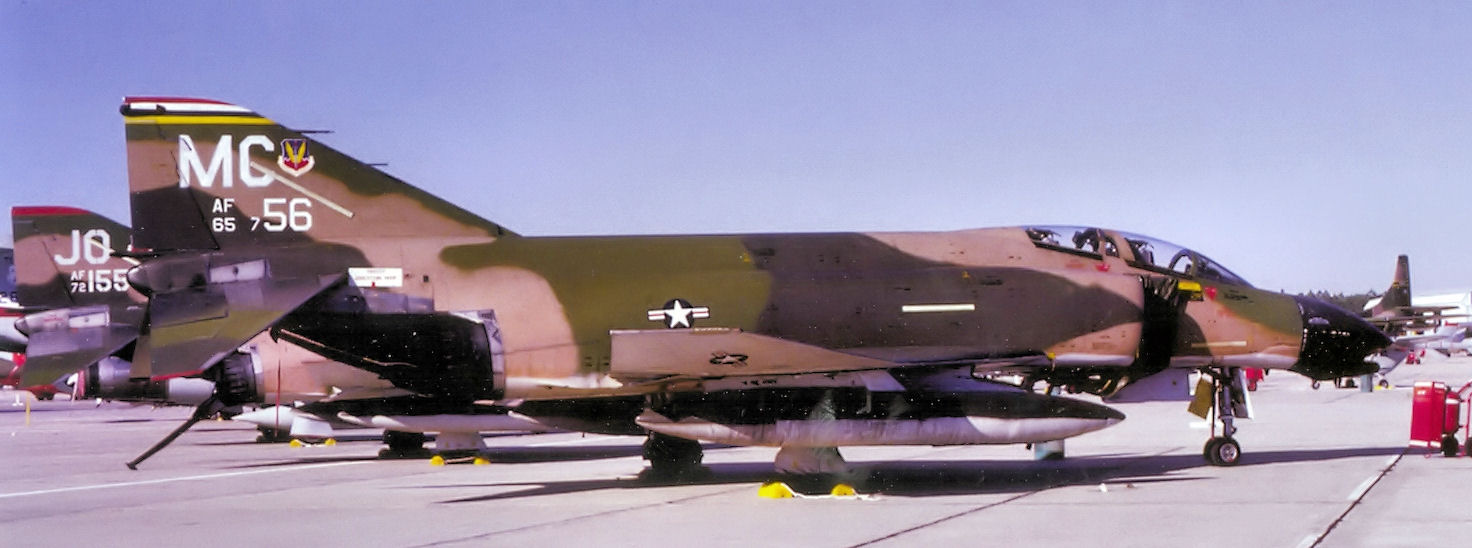
63d Tactical Fighter Squadron F-4D (Note: Aircraft is McDonnell F-4D-28-MC Phantom serial 65-756 at Dyess Air Force Base in 1979.)

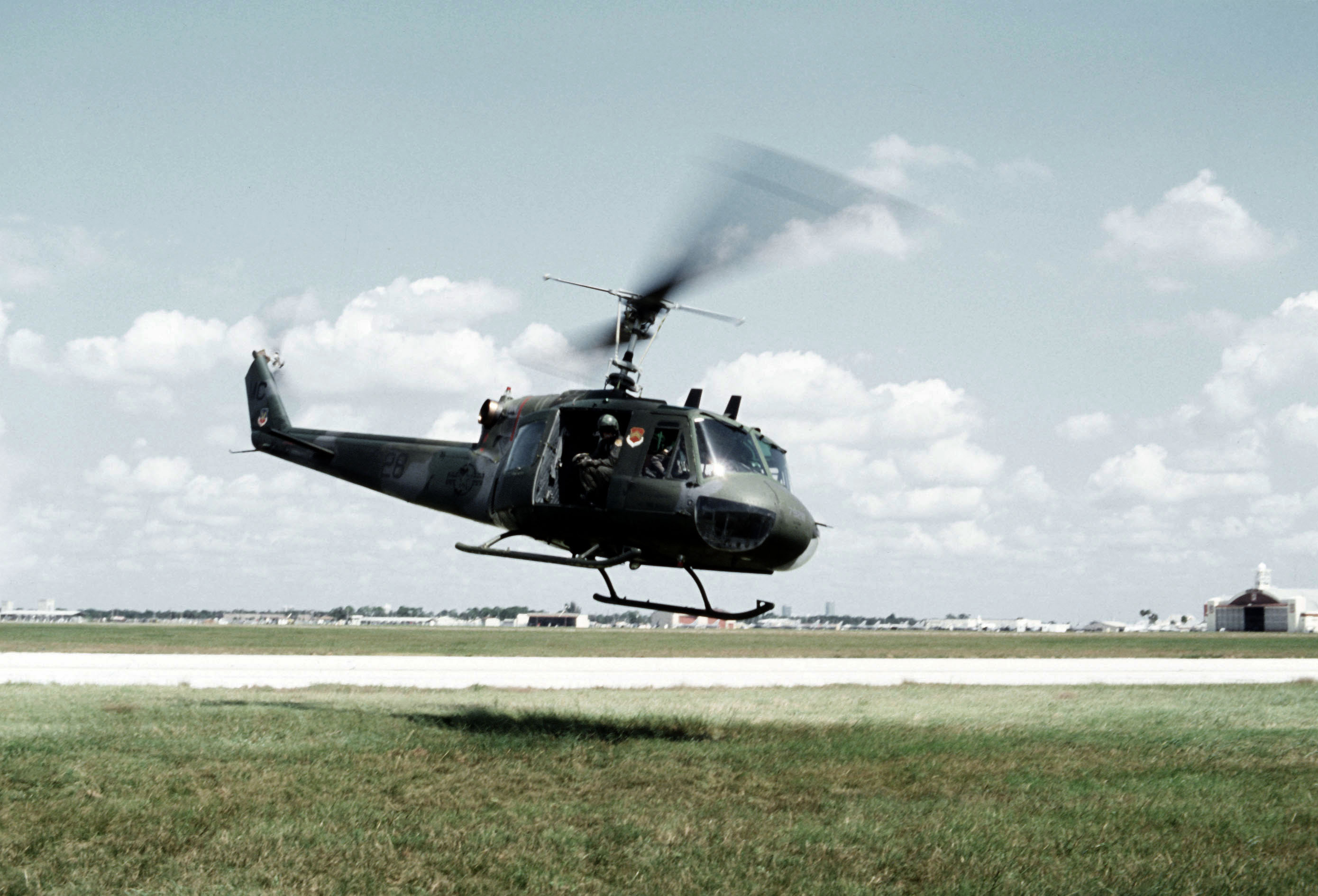
UH-1P used for range support at Avon Park

At MacDill, the wing became the 56th Tactical Fighter Wing and operated McDonnell F-4 Phantom IIs. In addition to acting as host for MacDill, the wing operated nearby Avon Park Air Force Range, Florida.

The wing conducted F-4D/E replacement training for pilots, weapon systems officers, and maintenance personnel until July 1982. It was equipped with UH-1P helicopters from 1976 to 1987, to support Avon Range logistics needs, search and rescue efforts, and humanitarian missions.

Starting in 1980 the wing began to convert to F-16A and F-16B aircraft, completing the transition in 1982. The 56th became the unit for transitioning USAF and select allied nation pilots into the new fighter, while continuing to augment NORAD's air defense forces in the southeastern US. The wing provided logistic support to US Central Command beginning in 1983 and to US Special Operations Command after 1986. It upgraded to F-16C and F-16D aircraft between 1988 and 1990, providing support personnel and equipment to units in Southwest Asia from August 1990 – March 1991.

The 1991 Base Realignment and Closure Commission evaluated the Air Force's need for fighter bases it was decided to close MacDill AFB except for a small communications element and transfer it to another service or agency.

This recommendation was later altered and MacDill AFB remained open, being transferred to the Air Mobility Command and eventually becoming home to the 6th Air Mobility Wing and its KC-135R and C-37A aircraft, while the 347th Wing, and later the 23rd Wing, at Moody AFB, Georgia would assume responsibility for the Avon Park Air Force Range and the Deployed Unit Complex (DUC) at MacDill AFB.

The 56th Fighter Wing moved on paper to Luke Air Force Base, Arizona on 1 April 1994, where it assumed the assets of the 58th Fighter Wing.

=== Flying training ===
At Luke, the 56th took over the 58th Wing F-16 training mission, but its McDonnell Douglas F-15 Eagle training mission was transferred to Tyndall Air Force Base, Florida.

After Hurricane Andrew battered Homestead Air Force Base, Florida, its three F-16 fighter squadrons (307th, 308th, and 309th) dispersed to Moody AFB and Shaw AFB for an interim period. In 1994, the 308th and 309th transferred to Luke and expanded the 56th to become the largest fighter wing in the Air Force. The wing reached its peak in 1997 when the 21st Fighter Squadron was added to train pilots for the Republic of China Air Force. This brought the total number of flying units based at Luke to eight (five active duty F-16 training squadrons, two FMS F-16 squadrons, and one Air Force Reserve F-16 squadron) and over 200 aircraft. This number was reduced by two active duty flying squadrons following the recommendations of the 2005 Base Realignment and Closure Commission.

In March 2014, The 54th Fighter Group was activated under the wing to conduct F-16 Fighting Falcon training as the 56th Operations Group transitions to F-35 Lightning II training. The group was established with a single flying squadron, but added a second squadron in 2015. The group consists of approximately 800 personnel, maintains $2.2 billion in F-16 assets and executes a $144 million operations and maintenance budget to carry out F-16 training.

=== Units in 2026 ===
- 56th Operations Group

The 56th Operations Group is the flying element of the wing. It trains and produce F-35 pilots and crew chiefs for the United States and allied forces. It also maintains resources to meet potential contingency and wartime tasking. Finally it trains all operators for air control squadrons which provide ground tactical command and control operations for the United States.

- 54th Fighter Group

The 54th Fighter Group is located at Holloman Air Force Base, New Mexico. The group trains an average of 180 students per year on the F-16, averaging more than 10,800 sorties and 14,600 hours per fiscal year.

- 56th Maintenance Group

The 56th Maintenance Group provides aircraft maintenance and generates more than 25,000 sorties compiling 32,000 flight hours per year. It is the largest maintenance group in the Air Force, with 2,200 members. The group also trains more than 3,000 maintenance technicians and 1,000 F-16 crew chiefs each year

- 607th Air Control Squadron

The 607th Air Control Squadron (ACS) is a unit at Luke Air Force Base in Arizona that trains Airmen to perform key roles in command and control operations around the world. The 607th ACS is known for its training and collaboration with other nations, and for its role in training Airmen for the Control and Reporting Center (CRC) career field. The 607th Air Control Squadron trains Air Battle Managers (ABM), Mission Systems Operators (MSO) and Weapons Directors (WD).

- 56th Mission Support Group

The 56th Mission Support Group has 1,965 members and performs the installation management. The base has approximately $396 million in land, building and real property including 4,200 acres at Luke and 1.7 million acres at the Barry M. Goldwater range complex.

- 56th Comptroller Squadron

The 56th Comptroller Squadron provides financial services, financial analysis, non-appropriated fund oversight and quality assurance for the wing.

== Lineage ==
- Established as the 56th Fighter Wing on 28 July 1947

Organized on 15 August 1947 (Note: The experimental (table of distribution) wing was discontinued on 1 August 1948. The permanent (table of organization) wing was established the same day. The Air Force later consolidated the two wings and considers this to have been a redesignation. Ravenstein, pp. 90–92.)
Redesignated 56th Fighter-Interceptor Wing on 20 January 1950
Inactivated on 6 February 1952

- Redesignated 56th Fighter Wing (Air Defense) and activated on 28 December 1960 (not organized)

Organized on 1 February 1961
Discontinued and inactivated on 1 January 1964

- Redesignated 56th Air Commando Wing and activated on 16 March 1967 (not organized)

Organized on 8 April 1967
Redesignated 56th Special Operations Wing on 1 August 1968
Redesignated 56th Tactical Fighter Wing on 30 June 1975
Redesignated 56th Tactical Training Wing on 1 October 1981
Redesignated 56th Fighter Wing on 1 October 1991

== Assignments ==
- Fifteenth Air Force, 15 August 1947
- Strategic Air Command, 1 October 1947
- Tenth Air Force, 1 December 1948 (attached to 26th Air Division 10 December 1949 – 19 February 1950, 30th Air Division after 20 February 1950)
- Eastern Air Defense Force, 1 September 1950 – 6 February 1952 (remained attached to 30th Air Division)
- Air Defense Command, 28 December 1960 (not organized)
- Sault Sainte Marie Air Defense Sector, 1 February 1961
- Duluth Air Defense Sector, 1 October 1963 – 1 January 1964
- Pacific Air Forces, 16 March 1967 (not organized)
- Thirteenth Air Force, 8 April 1967 (attached to Seventh Air Force until 26 February 1974, then attached to United States Support Activities Group/Seventh Air Force)
- Ninth Air Force, 30 June 1975
- Nineteenth Air Force, 1 April 1994 – 13 July 2012
- Air Education and Training Command, 13 July 2012 – 1 October 2014
- Nineteenth Air Force, 1 October 2014 – 17 July 2026
- Fifteenth Air Force, 17 July 2026

== Components ==
Groups

- 56th Fighter Group (later 56th Fighter-Interceptor, 56th Operations) Group: 15 August 1947 – 6 February 1952; 1 November 1991 – 4 January 1994; 1 April 1994 – present
- 54th Fighter Group, 1 March 2014 – 1 October 2018

Squadrons

- 1st Air Commando Squadron (later 1st Special Operations Squadron): 20 December 1967 – 15 December 1972
- 13th Tactical Fighter Training Squadron: 15 January 1976 – 1 July 1982
- 18th Special Operations Squadron: 25 August 1971 – 31 December 1972 (AC–119)
- 21st Helicopter Squadron (later 21st Special Operations Squadron): 27 November 1967 – 30 June 1975
- 22d Special Operations Squadron: 25 October 1968 – 30 September 1970
- 23d Tactical Air Support Squadron: 15 March 1972 – 30 June 1975 (O-2A, OV-10)
- 61st Tactical Fighter Squadron (later 61st Tactical Fighter Training Squadron): 30 June 1975 – 1 November 1991
- 62d Tactical Fighter Squadron (later 62d Tactical Fighter Training Squadron): 1 February 1961 – 16 December 1963; 30 June 1975 – 1 November 1991
- 63d Tactical Fighter Squadron (later 63d Tactical Fighter Training Squadron): 30 June 1975 – 1 November 1991
- 72d Tactical Fighter Training Squadron: 1 July 1982 – 1 November 1991
- 97th Fighter-Interceptor Squadron: attached 1 December 1950 – 20 May 1951
- 361st Tactical Electronic Warfare Squadron: 1 September 1972 – 30 June 1974 (EC-47N/P)
- 554th Reconnaissance Squadron: 15 December 1970 – 30 September 1972 (QU-22B)
- 602d Fighter Squadron (later 602d Special Operations Squadron): 8 April 1967 – 31 December 1970

Udorn Royal Thai Air Force Base until October 1968

- 606th Air Commando Squadron (later 606th Special Operations Squadron): 8 April 1967 – 15 June 1971
- 607th Air Control Squadron: 1 Nov 1991 – Present
- 609th Air Commando Squadron (later 609th Special Operations Squadron): 15 September 1967 – 1 December 1969
- 4501st Tactical Fighter Replacement Squadron: 30 June 1975 – 15 January 1976

== Stations ==
- Selfridge Field (later Selfridge Air Force Base), Michigan, 15 August 1947 – 6 February 1952
- K.I. Sawyer Air Force Base, Michigan, 1 February 1961 – 1 January 1964
- Nakhon Phanom Royal Thai Air Force Base, Thailand, 8 April 1967 – 30 June 1975
- MacDill Air Force Base, Florida, 30 June 1975 – 31 March 1994
- Luke Air Force Base, Arizona, 1 April 1994 – present

== Aircraft ==
- Lockheed P-80 (later F-80) Shooting Star, 1947–1950
- North American F-86 Sabre, 1950–1952
- Republic F-47 Thunderbolt, 1951–1952
- North American F-51 Mustang, 1951–1952
- Lockheed F-94 Starfire, 1951–1952
- McDonnel F-101 VooDoo, 1961–1963
- Douglas A-1 Skyraider, 1967–1972
- Douglas A-26 Invader, 1967–1969
- Sikorsky CH-3, 1967–1972
- Fairchild C-123 Provider, 1967–1971
- Fairchild UC-123 Provider, 1968–1971
- North American T-28 Trojan 1967–1973
- North American RT-28 Trojan 1967–1972
- de Havilland Canada U-6 Beaver, 1967
- Helio U-10 Courier, 1967–1969
- Douglas C-47 Skytrain, 1969–1972
- Douglas EC-47 Skytrain, 1972–1974
- Sikorsky CH-53 Sea Stallion, 1970–1975
- Beechcraft QU-22 Pave Eagle, 1970–1972
- Fairchild AC-119, 1971–1972
- Sikorsky H-34, 1972
- North American OV-10 Bronco, 1972–1975
- Cessna O-1 Bird Dog, 1973
- McDonnell F-4 Phantom II, 1975–1982
- Bell UH-1P Huey, 1976–1987
- General Dynamics F-16 Fighting Falcon, 1980–present
- Lockheed Martin F-35A Lightning II, 2014–present

== Awards and campaigns ==
- Presidential Unit Citation:

(Vietnam): 1 November 1968 – 1 May 1969
1 October 1969 – 30 April 1970
1 April 1972 – 22 February 1973

- Air Force Outstanding Unit Award with Combat "V" Device:

1 December 1970 – 30 November 1971
1 December 1971 – 29 February 1972
23 February 1973 – 28 February 1974
24 January-2 May 1975

- Air Force Outstanding Unit Award

1 January 1977 – 1 January 1979
1 July 1980 – 30 June 1982
1 June 1984 – 31 May 1986
1 May 1987 – 30 April 1989
1 May 1989 – 30 April 1990
1 May 1990 – 30 April 1991
1 July 1994 – 30 June 1996
1 July 1996 – 30 June 1998
1 July 1998 – 30 June 2000
1 July 2001 – 30 June 2003
1 July 2003 – 30 June 2005
1 July 2005 – 30 June 2006
1 July 2006 – 30 June 2007
1 July 2007 – 30 June 2008

- Republic of Vietnam Gallantry Cross with Palm:

8 April 1967 – 28 January 1973

Campaigns
Vietnam Air Offensive, Phase II; Vietnam Air Offensive, Phase III; Vietnam Air/Ground; Vietnam Air Offensive, Phase IV; TET 69/ Counteroffensive; Vietnam Summer-Fall, 1969; Vietnam Winter-Spring, 1970; Sanctuary Counteroffensive; Southwest Monsoon; Commando Hunt V; Commando Hunt VI; Commando Hunt VII; Vietnam Ceasefire.

== Bibliography ==
- Anthony, Major Victor B. (1973). The Air Force in Southeast Asia: Tactics and Techniques of Night Operations 1961–1970 (PDF). Washington, DC: Office of Air Force History. ISBN 1-780396-57-0. Archived from the original (PDF) on 19 September 2020.
- Cornett, Lloyd H; Johnson, Mildred W (1980). A Handbook of Aerospace Defense Organization, 1946 - 1980 (PDF). Peterson AFB, CO: Office of History, Aerospace Defense Center. Archived from the original (PDF) on 23 November 2006.
- Grant, C. L. "The Development of Continental Air Defense to 1 September 1954, USAF Historical Study No. 126" (PDF). Research Studies Institute, USAF Historical Division, Air University.
- McMullen, Richard F. (1964) The Fighter Interceptor Force 1962–1964, ADC Historical Study No. 27 (Confidential, declassified 22 March 2000)
- Ravenstein, Charles A. (1984). Air Force Combat Wings, Lineage & Honors Histories 1947–1977. Washington, DC: Office of Air Force History. ISBN 0-912799-12-9.
- Ray, Thomas W. "Nuclear Armament: Its Acquisition, Control and Application to Manned Interceptors 1951–1963" ADC Historical Study No. 20, Air Defense Command, Ent AFB, CO (Secret- Restricted Data, redacted version declassified 20 June 1996)
- NORAD/CONAD Participation in the Cuban Missile Crisis, Historical Reference Paper No. 8, Directorate of Command History Continental Air Defense Command, Ent AFB, CO, 1 Feb 63 (Top Secret NOFORN declassified 9 March 1996)
- "56th Fighter Wing ushers in new era under new commander, reassigned to Air Combat Command". Aerotech News.

Further reading

- Berger, Carl, ed. (1977). 1961–1973: An Illustrated History (PDF). The United States in Southeast Asia. Washington, DC: Office of Air Force History. ISBN 978-0912799162. LCCN 76608038. Archived from the original (PDF) on 20 December 2016.
