= List of Royal Thai Air Force bases =

During 1954–1975 (the Vietnam War or Second Indochina War), the Thai Government allowed the Joint United States Military Advisory Group - Thailand (JUSMAG-THAI) to fund and manage the modernization of Royal Thai Air Force bases. In an unsigned agreement these airbases were to be operated by the United States Air Force for the specific purpose of attacking North Vietnam with some 500 airplanes. These bases were supplied by a Naval Base near the deep-water port of Sattahip. Many American military specialists were assigned to JUSMAG-THAI in Bangkok. As many as 45,000 US military personnel were stationed in Thailand.

== History ==
Air bases of the Royal Thai Air Force

The RTAF command structure consists of headquarters and five groups, which are: command group, combat group, support group, education and training group, and special services group. During the 1960s Thailand experienced one of the most rapid growth rates among developing countries: more than 10% per year in GNP, and about 8% per year in real output. The First National Economic Development Plan (1961-1966) was successfully implemented. US grant economic assistance totalled about US$500 million through the end of 1970. Direct military assistance totalled another US$800 million for the same period, continuing at the rate of US$25–55 million per year. According to US government statistics, between 1950 and 1987 the US provided Thailand with more than US$2 billion in military assistance.

The vast nature of this enterprise enriched Thailand at every level of society, enabling a jump in indigenous heavy construction, communications, transportation, and defense. The following categories are found in United States Government Accountability Office catalog summaries: locomotives, aeronautical ground services, Bangkok-Saraburi Highway, southern roads, development loans, technical support, civil police, village radios, agricultural development, rural health, potable water, malaria eradication, rural electrification, Chiang Mai Medical School.

Additionally, there was the construction of 315 km (196 mi) of all-weather roads in the north and northeast, requiring 138 bridges and culverts, costing US$11 million (US$174,000 for maintenance equipment; requiring the training of 199 personnel (36 mechanics, 6 supply specialists, 97 equipment operators, 60 drivers)).

== War's end ==
The end of the war resulted in all US personnel and equipment being removed by 1976 at Thai request. The Royal Thai Air Force found it too costly to operate any but Khorat and Takhli. Many of the others were turned over to the Department of Civil Aviation.

- (RTN) U-Tapao International Airport-----12 41' N, 101 00' E
- Ubon Ratchathani---------15 15' N, 104 52' E
- Khorat (Nakhon Ratchasima) -------14°55′58″N 102°04′40″E
- Khon Kaen----16 28' N, 102 47' E
- Udon Thani ---------17 23' N, 102 47' E
- Takhli-------15°16′17″N 100°17′40″E
- Nam Phong----16 39' N, 102 58' E
- Nakhon Phanom------17 23' N, 104 39' E

== Summary of US aid ==
The following data is taken from what appears to be a working paper summary of the United States Operations Mission (USOM) in Thailand dated 1968, found at the Cornell University Library "Pamphlet HC Thailand 370" 3-1924-007-619-574.

AID (Agency for International Development) Assistance Through FY 1968 (millions of dollars)

- Grants 431; Loans 64; Regional 34: Total 529
- Staff: 460 Americans, 660 Thai
- Training: 6,300 Thais sent abroad 1951-68 for study in the fields of: agriculture, 1,490; education, 1,341; health, 969; public administration, 824; civil policing, 435; community development, 501; transportation, 287; industry 202; labor, 28; Mekong and Pa Mong projects, 16; general, 218.

Development Indicators Taiwan vs Thailand: GNP 234/141, Per Capita Electric Power 680/58, Literacy Rate 72/70, Inhabitants per physician 1500/7300, Roads per 1000 square miles 590/40, Population Density 1010/170,

Thai Gross National Product (GNP) in constant 1965 millions of dollars: 1961/2925, 1962/3082, 1963/3386, 1964/3590, 1965/3907, 1966/4339, 1967/4551

== See also ==
- http://www.country-data.com/cgi-bin/query/r-13803.html
- http://home.pcisys.net/~jjwilson/tob.html
