= 602nd Special Operations Squadron =

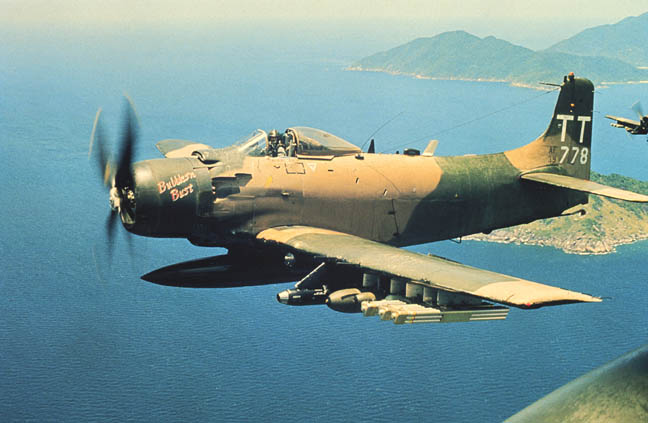
- A Douglas A-1H Skyraider of the 602nd Special Operations Squadron over Vietnam in June 1970
- Active: 1944–1945; 1963–1970
- Country: United States
- Branch: United States Air Force
- Role: Close air support and search and rescue escort
- Nickname: Firefly
- Engagements: China-Burma-India Theater; Vietnam War
- Decorations: Distinguished Unit Citation; Presidential Unit Citation; Air Force Outstanding Unit Award with Combat "V" Device; Republic of Vietnam Gallantry Cross with Palm

Insignia
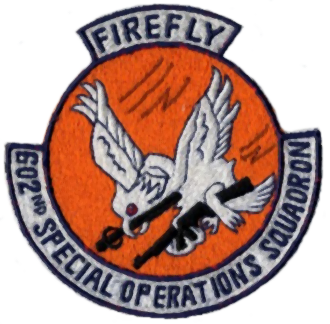
- Patch with 602nd Special Operations Squadron emblem
- (Note: Approved 3 August 1945. Description: Over and through a light turquoise blue disc, a caricatured brown eagle with yellow beak and feet, diving through space toward dexter base, wearing a GI helmet with orange straps, holding a commando knife, proper, in the beak, and grasping and firing a black "tommy" gun in the talons, all emitting speed lines to the rear.): 2nd Fighter Commando Squadron emblem Copyright Walt Disney Productions

The 602nd Special Operations Squadron was a United States Air Force squadron that operated in Southeast Asia during the Vietnam War.

== History ==
=== Vietnam War ===
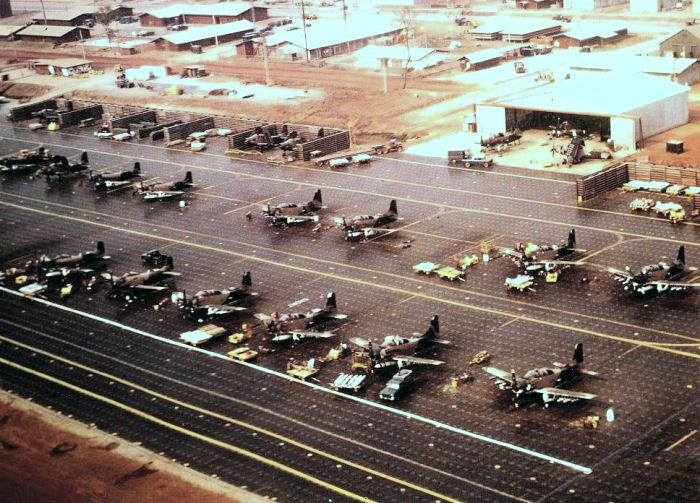
Douglas A-1 Skyraiders of the 1st and 602nd Special Operations Squadrons at Nakhon Phanom Royal Thai Air Force Base during the Vietnam War

The 602nd Fighter Squadron (Commando) was activated in May 1964 for the Vietnam War, and along with the 1st Air Commando Squadron, was a part of the 34th Tactical Group. The squadron became operational at Bien Hoa Air Base on 15 October 1964. By 1966 the squadron had been renamed the 602nd Air Commando Squadron and moved, first to Nha Trang Air Base in South Vietnam, and then to Udorn Royal Thai Air Force Base, Thailand. In March 1968 it moved again to Nakhon Phanom Royal Thai Navy Base. On 1 August 1968 it was redesignated the 602nd Special Operations Squadron, and was inactivated on 31 December 1970 at Nakhon Phanom. The original Squadron patch was drawn by Walt Disney in 1944. The sky was blue with a wisp of cloud behind the left wing of the eagle. No call sign was mounted above the patch.

The squadron operated Douglas A-1 Skyraiders under the call sign "Firefly". Their daylight task was the primary one of combat search and rescue of air crew downed in the Kingdom of Laos. A secondary task was night operations as flareships supporting the Hmong guerrillas of General Vang Pao's Clandestine Army in the Operation Barrel Roll area. At times, the squadron flew single ship sorties; they would also sometimes mark their own targets for their air strikes.

== Lineage ==
- Constituted as the 2nd Fighter Reconnaissance Squadron on 11 April 1944

Activated on 20 April 1944
Redesignated 2nd Fighter Squadron, Commando on 2 June 1944
Inactivated on 12 November 1945

- Disbanded on 8 October 1948
- Reconstituted, redesignated 602nd Fighter Squadron, Commando, and activated on 15 April 1963 (not organized)

Organized on 1 May 1963

- Redesignated 602nd Special Operations Squadron on 1 August 1968

Inactivated on 31 December 1970

=== Assignments ===
- Third Air Force: 20 April 1944
- 2nd Air Commando Group: 22 April 1944 – 12 November 1945
- Tactical Air Command: 15 April 1963 (not organized)
- 1st Air Commando Group (later 1st Air Commando Wing): 1 May 1963
- Pacific Air Forces: 1 October 1964
- 34th Tactical Group: 18 October 1964
- 6251st Tactical Fighter Wing: 8 July 1965
- 3rd Tactical Fighter Wing: 21 November 1965
- 14th Air Commando Wing: 8 March 1966
- 56th Air Commando Wing (later 56th Special Operations Wing): 8 April 1967 – 31 December 1970

=== Stations ===
- Lakeland Army Air Field, Florida, 20 April 1944
- Cross City Army Air Field, Florida, 9 June 1944
- Alachua Army Air Field, Florida, 21 June 1944
- Drew Field, Florida, 17 August 1944
- Lakeland Army Air Field, Florida, 22 August 1944 – 23 October 1944
- Kalaikunda, India, 15 December 1944
- Cox's Bazar, India, 13 February 1945
- Kalaikunda, India, 14 May 1945 – 22 October 1945
- Camp Kilmer, New Jersey, 11 November 1945 – 12 November 1945
- Eglin Air Force Base Auxiliary Airfield#9, Florida, 1 May 1963
- Bien Hoa Air Base, Vietnam, 12 Oct 1964
- Nha Trang Air Base, Vietnam, 1 Feb 1966
- Udorn Air Base, Thailand, 15 Dec 1966
- Nakhon Phanom Royal Thai Naval Air Base, Thailand, 30 Jun 1968 – 31 Dec 1970

=== Aircraft ===
- North American P-51D Mustang, 1944–1945
- North American F-6 Mustang, 1945
- Douglas B-26B/C Invader, 1963–1964
- Douglas A-1E/G/H/J Skyraider, 1964–1970

=== Operations ===
- Combat in CBI Theater, 14 Feb – 9 May 1945
- Combat in SEA, 1964–1970

=== Campaign streamers ===
- World War II:
  - Central Burma
- Vietnam:
  - Vietnam Advisory;
  - Vietnam Defense;
  - Vietnam Air;
  - Vietnam Air Offensive;
  - Vietnam Air Offensive, Phase II;
  - Vietnam Air Offensive, Phase III;
  - Vietnam Air/Ground;
  - Vietnam Air Offensive, Phase IV;
  - Tet 69/Counteroffensive;
  - Vietnam Summer–Fall 1969;
  - Vietnam Winter–Spring 1970;
  - Sanctuary Counteroffensive;
  - Southwest Monsoon;
  - Commando Hunt V

=== Decorations ===
- Distinguished Unit Citation: Bangkok, Thailand, 15 Mar 1945
- Presidential Unit Citations: Vietnam: 1 Jul 1965 – 30 Jun 1966; 1 Jul 1966 – 7 Mar 1967; 12 Apr – 30 Jun 1967; 1 Nov 1968 – 1 May 1969; 1 Oct 1969 – 30 Apr 1970
- Air Force Outstanding Unit Award With Combat "V" Device: 1–31 Dec 1970
- Republic of Vietnam Gallantry Cross with Palm, 1 Apr 1966 – 31 Dec 1970
