= 609th Special Operations Squadron =

- 609th Special Operations Squadron patch
- Active: 1942-1944; 1944-1945; 1967-1969
- Country: United States
- Branch: United States Air Force
- Role: Special Operations
- Part of: Pacific Air Forces
- Nickname: Nimrods
- Engagements: Vietnam War
- Decorations: Presidential Unit Citation; Air Force Outstanding Unit Award with Combat "V" Device; Republic of Vietnam Gallantry Cross with Palm

The 609th Special Operations Squadron is an inactive United States Air Force unit. Its last assignment was with the 56th Special Operations Wing at Nakhon Phanom Royal Thai Navy Base, Thailand. The squadron served for two and a half years combat duty during the Vietnam War, primarily flying missions over the Ho Chi Minh Trail in Laos. It earned several decorations, including the Presidential Unit Citation, before it was inactivated in December 1969.

The first predecessor of the squadron was the 349th Night Fighter Squadron, which served as a night fighter training unit in Florida and California until it was disbanded in a reorganization of Army Air Forces training units and replaced by the 450th AAF Base Unit.

The second predecessor of the 609th was the 329th Transport Squadron, which was organized overseas to provide airlift services in the Mediterranean Theater of Operations

== History ==
=== Night fighter training ===
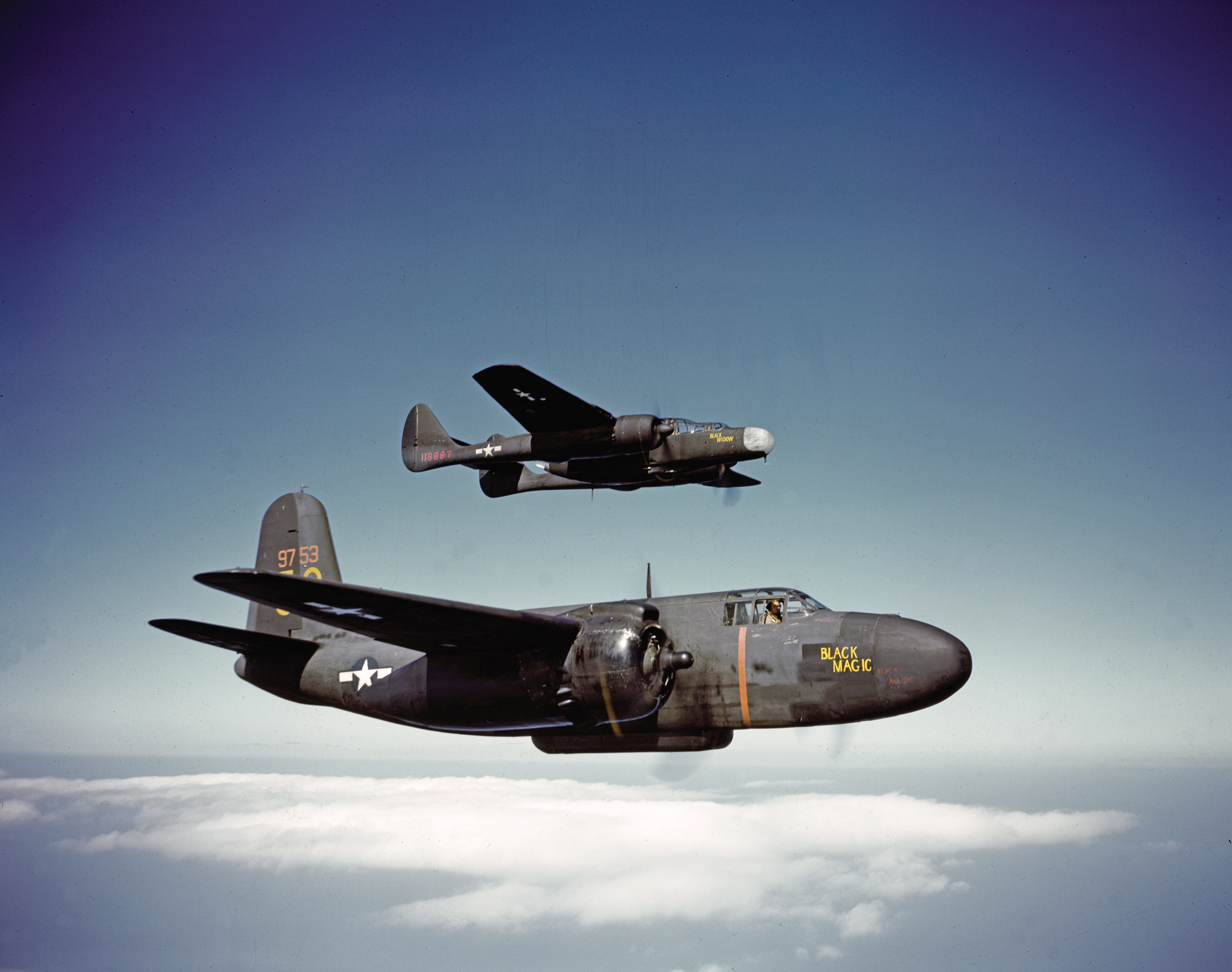
The first YP-61 to arrive at Orlando Army Air Base and a squadron P-70

The 349th Night Fighter Squadron was formed at Orlando Army Air Base, Florida in October 1942 as part of the Army Air Force School of Applied Tactics Fighter Command School from elements of the 81st Fighter Squadron. Its personnel were veteran American pilots trained by the Royal Air Force in night interception operations. It was initially equipped with three Douglas DB-7s and twenty-three Douglas P-70s. Shortages in operational flying aircraft, spare parts and other issues kept flying training very rudimentary for the squadron's first classes that graduated in December 1942.

As 1943 progressed additional aircraft and equipment arrived and the program expanded. In September, the first American-built dedicated night fighter began to arrive, the YP-61, and a few production Northrop P-61A Black Widows. In January 1944 the entire night fighter training program moved to Hammer Field, California and was placed under IV Fighter Command. The move placed the squadron nearer to Northrop Aircraft manufacturing facility at Hawthorne, California. Most P-61 squadrons trained by the squadron were planned to deploy for operations in the Pacific and China Burma India Theaters.

In March 1944 the 348th was disbanded when the AAF found that standard military units, based on relatively inflexible tables of organization were proving less well adapted to the training mission. Accordingly, a more functional system was adopted in which each base was organized into a separate numbered unit during a reorganization of units in the United States. The squadron's personnel and equipment were transferred to Squadron B of the 450th Army Air Forces Base Unit (Night Fighter Replacement Training Unit).

=== Airlift in the Mediterranean Theater ===
The 329th Transport Squadron delivered cargo and mail throughout the Mediterranean Theater of Operations from its activation in March 1944 until it was inactivated in September 1945. The squadron was disbanded in 1948, then reconstituted in 1985 and consolidated with the 609th.

=== Combat Operations During the Vietnam War ===
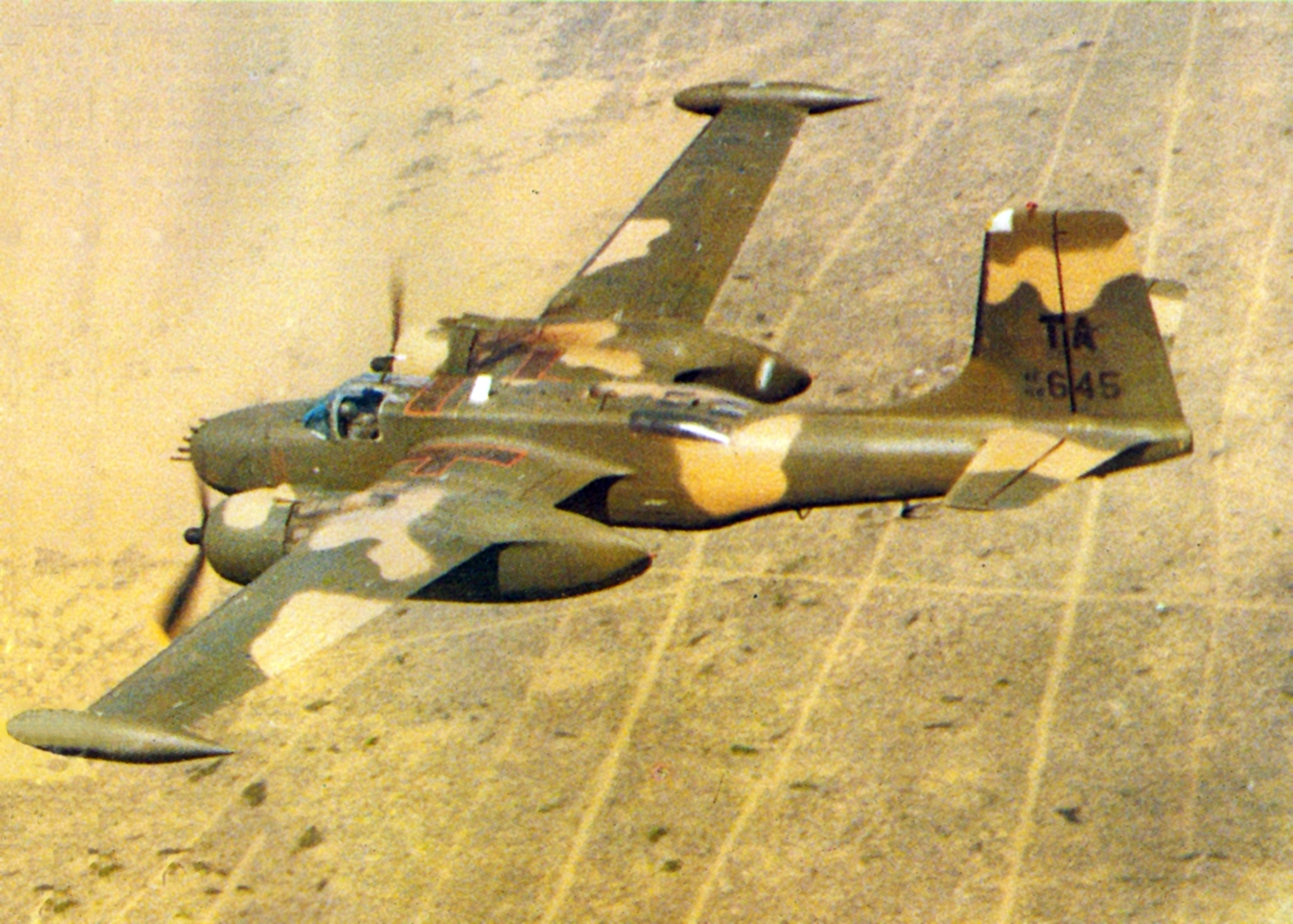
An A-26 Invader of the 609th Special Operations Squadron flying near Nakhon Phanom Royal Thai Air Base in 1969.

The 609th Special Operations Squadron was organized as the 609th Air Commando Squadron at Nakhon Phanom RTAFB, Thailand on 15 September 1967. It was assigned to the 56th Air Commando Wing. The squadron flew the Douglas A-26 Invader, a twin engine attack bomber of WWII vintage. These aircraft were transferred from the 606th Air Commando Squadron which transitioned to other aircraft. The primary mission of the 609th was night interdiction of truck traffic along the Ho Chi Minh Trail. Its call sign for these missions was "Nimrod", inherited from the 606th and other squadrons that had flown that mission, and "The Nimrods" soon became the squadron's nickname. The squadron's A-26 aircraft carried tail letters "TA".

On 1 August 1968, all Air Commando Wings were redesignated as Special Operations Units, and the 56th Air Commando Wing became the 56th Special Operations Wing, with the 609th Air Commando Squadron becoming the 609th Special Operations Squadron.

The night interdiction tasks of the 609th were gradually taken over by squadrons flying Lockheed AC-130 gunships, and the A-26 aircraft were phased out of active service by November 1969. By the time the last four surviving A-26s were withdrawn at the unit stand down, the squadron had flown 7,159 combat missions, and been credited with destroying 4,268 enemy supply trucks.

The 609th was inactivated on 1 December 1969. The squadron's losses had been heavy, and it was awarded the Presidential Unit Citation for gallantry.

The remains of two squadron pilots, Maj. James E. Sizemore and Maj. Howard V. Andre, shot down over Laos in 1969, were recovered in 2013 and buried at Arlington National Cemetery

== Lineage ==
349th Night Fighter Squadron

- Constituted as the 349th Night Fighter Squadron on 1 October 1942

Activated on 4 October 1942
Disbanded on 31 March 1944
Reconstituted on 19 September 1985 and consolidated with the 609th Special Operations Squadron

329th Transport Squadron

- Constituted as the 329th Transport Squadron (Cargo & Mail), Light on 12 May 1944

Activated on 31 May 1944
Inactivated on 9 September 1945
Disbanded on 8 October 1948
Reconstituted on 19 September 1985 and consolidated with the 609th Special Operations Squadron

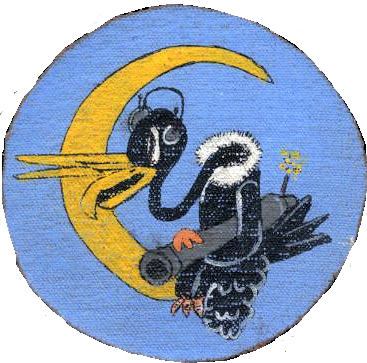
the 349th Night Fighter Squadron patch

609th Special Operations Squadron

- Constituted as the 609th Air Commando Squadron on 22 August 1967 and activated (not organized)

Organized on 15 September 1967
Redesignated 609th Special Operations Squadron on 1 August 1968
Inactivated on 1 December 1969

=== Assignments ===
- Fighter Command School, 4 October 1942
- Army Air Forces School of Applied Tactics, 21 January 1943
- 481st Night Fighter Operational Training Group, 26 July 1943
- Fourth Air Force, 15 January 1944 – 31 March 1944
- Mediterranean Air Transport Service, 31 May 1944 – 9 September 1945
- Pacific Air Forces, 22 August 1967 (not organized)
- 56th Air Commando Wing (later 56th Special Operations Wing), 15 September 1967 – 1 December 1969.

=== Stations ===
- Kissimmee Army Air Field, Florida, 4 October 1942
- Hammer Field, California, 15 January – 31 March 1944
- Capodichino Airport, Naples, Italy, 31 May 1944 – 9 September 1945
- Nakhon Phanom Royal Thai Navy Base, Thailand, 15 September 1967 – 1 December 1969

=== Commanders ===
Lt Col William R. Yancey, January 1943-31 March 1944
Maj James E. Scoggins Jr., 31 May 1944
Capt William E. Gedecke, c. June 1944
Capt Bernard J. Weist, 24 August 1944 – unknown
Lt Col Allen F. Learmonth, 15 September 1967
Lt Col Robert E. Brumm, by 31 March 1968
Lt Col John J. Shippey, by 30 September 1968
Lt Col Robert L. Schultz, by 31 December 1968
Lt Col Robert W. Stout, by 30 September 1969
Lt Col Jackie R. Douglas, by 30 October 1969 – 1 December 1969

=== Aircraft ===
- Douglas DB-7, 1942
- L-6, 1942–1943
- Northrop P-61 Black Widow, 1942–1944
- Douglas P-70 Havoc, 1942–1944
- Boeing B-17 Flying Fortress, 1944–1945
- North American B-25 Mitchell, 1944–1945
- Douglas C-47 Skytrain, 1944–1945
- Douglas C-53 Skytrooper, 1944–1945
- Douglas A-26 Invader, 1967–1969.

=== Awards and campaigns ===
Award streamer	Award	Dates	Notes
	Presidential Unit Citation	1 October 1967–30 April 1968	609th Air Commando Squadron (later 609th Special Operations Squadron)
	Presidential Unit Citation	1 November 1968-1 May 1969	609th Special Operations Squadron
	Presidential Unit Citation	1 October 1969-1 December 1969	609th Special Operations Squadron
	Air Force Outstanding Unit Award with Combat "V" Device	1 July 1968–1 December 1969	609th Special Operations Squadron
	Vietnamese Gallantry Cross with Palm	15 September 1967-1 December 1969	609th Air Commando Squadron (later 609th Special Operations Squadron)

Campaign Streamer	Campaign	Dates	Notes
	American Theater without inscription	9 October 1942 – 31 March 1944	349th Night Fighter Squadron
	Rome-Arno	31 May 1944 – 9 September 1944	329th Transport Squadron
	Vietnam Air Offensive, Phase II	15 September 1967 – 31 March 1968	609th Air Commando Squadron
	Vietnam Air/Ground	22 January 1968 – 7 July 1968	609th Air Commando Squadron
	Vietnam Air Offensive, Phase III	1 April 1968 – 31 October 1968	609th Air Commando Squadron (later 609th Special Operations Squadron)
	Vietnam Air Offensive, Phase IV	1 November 1968 – 22 February 1969	609th Special Operations Squadron
	Tet 1969/Counteroffensive	23 February 1969 – 8 June 1969	609th Special Operations Squadron
	Vietnam Summer-Fall 1969	9 June 1969 – 31 October 1969	609th Special Operations Squadron
	Vietnam Winter-Spring 1970	3 November 1969-31 December 1969	609th Special Operations Squadron
