= Nakhon Phanom Royal Thai Navy Base =

Royal Thai Navy facility

Nakhon Phanom Royal Thai Navy Base
- Part of Royal Thai Navy (RTN)
- Nakhon Phanom Province
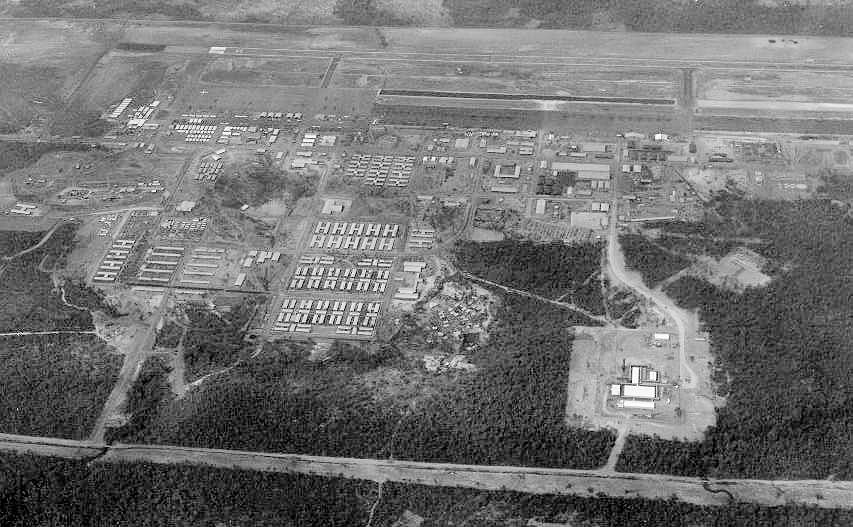
- Nakhon Phanom Royal Thai Air Force Base in the 1960s looking to the southwest

Site information
- Type: Naval Air Base
- Owner: Royal Thai Navy
- Operator: Royal Thai Navy
- Controlled by: Royal Thai Navy
- Condition: Military Naval Air Base

Location
- Coordinates: 17°23′02″N 104°38′35″E

Site history
- Built: 1963
- Built by: Mobile Construction Battalion Three
- In use: 1963-present
- Battles/wars: Vietnam War

Airfield information
- IATA: KOP; ICAO: VTUW

Summary
- Elevation AMSL: 587 ft (179 m)
- Coordinates: 17°23′02″N 104°38′35″E

Map
- Location of Nakhon Phanom Royal Thai Air Force Base

Runways
Direction	Length		Surface
Direction	ft	m	Surface
15/33	8,203	2,500	Asphalt

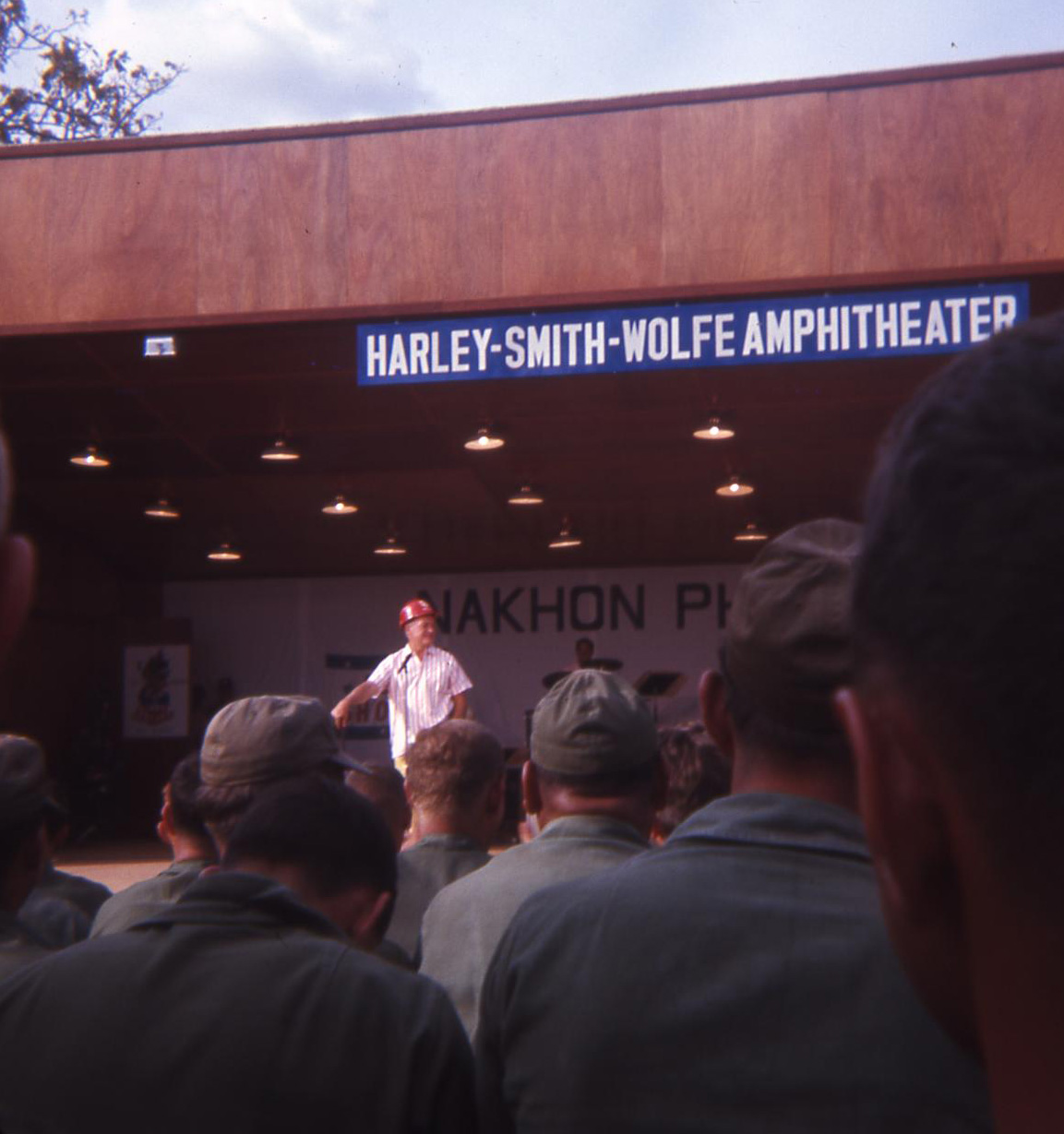
Bob Hope's 1966 Christmas Show at Nakhon Phanom

The Nakhon Phanom Royal Thai Navy Base (NKP), formerly Nakhon Phanom Royal Thai Air Force Base, is a Royal Thai Navy facility used for riverine patrols along the Mekong River. It is approximately 587 km (365 mi) northeast of Bangkok, 14.5 km (9.0 mi) west of Nakhon Phanom city in Nakhon Phanom Province in the northeastern region of Thailand, and 411 km (255 mi) from Hanoi in Vietnam. The Mekong River is NKP's border with Laos. The airfield at NKP is jointly used as a civilian airport.

== History ==
Nakhon Phanom Royal Thai Navy Base was established in the 1950s as a RTAF base.

The civil war inside Laos and fears of it spreading into Thailand led the Thai government to allow the United States to covertly use five Thai bases beginning in 1961 for the air defence of Thailand and to fly reconnaissance flights over Laos.

Under Thailand's "gentleman's agreement" with the United States, Royal Thai Air Force Bases used by the USAF were considered Royal Thai Air Force bases and were commanded by Thai officers. Thai air police controlled access to the bases, along with USAF Security Police, who assisted them in base defence using sentry dogs, observation towers, and machine gun bunkers. All United States Air Force personnel were not fully armed. There were insufficient arms due to the nature of the mission at NKP. Often instructions were given prior to off-base activities to avoid answering questions posed by the press.

The USAF forces at Nakhon Phanom were under the command of the United States Pacific Air Forces (PACAF).

The APO for NKP was APO San Francisco, 96310

== The USAF at Nakhon Phanom ==
During the Vietnam War NKP was a front-line facility of the Royal Thai Air Force (RTAF) used by the United States in its efforts to defend South Vietnam against insurgency by North Vietnam and the Pathet Lao guerrillas in Laos from 1961 to 1975.

Beginning in the late 1950s, North Vietnam began to move troops into areas of eastern Laos in support of the Pathet Lao, and also as a defensive measure to protect their logistical support of the insurgency in South Vietnam. In September 1959, North Vietnam formed Group 959 in Laos with the aim of building the Pathet Lao into a stronger force in its guerrilla war aimed at overthrowing the Royal Lao Government. Group 959 openly supplied, trained and supported the Pathet Lao militarily.

With Thailand sharing a long common border with Laos along the Mekong River, the Thai government was increasingly concerned about the spread of a communist insurgency into Thailand, which already faced a growing insurgency of its own in that part of the country. The Thai government were concerned about the activities of the Communist Party of Thailand It was therefore receptive to the idea of allowing U.S. military personnel to use Thai territory for operations in support of the Lao Government, and later in support of South Vietnam.

The first American military personnel to arrive at NKP in 1962 were the U.S. Navy's Mobile Construction Battalion Three who undertook the task of constructing runways and raising the first buildings at the new base as part of a United States commitment under SEATO with the 6,000-foot (1,800 m) PSP runway opening on 1 June 1963.

On 20 June 1964 2 HH-43B of the 33rd Air Rescue Squadron and their crews were deployed to NKP to provide search and rescue over western Laos for US aircraft engaged in Yankee Team missions, however their short range limited their usefulness. Conditions at NKP were initially spartan with no latrines or electric power. At the end of June an electrical generator was installed and living facilities began to be constructed.

The 507th Tactical Control Squadron began arriving in August 1964, with the bulk of its personnel arriving in 1964.

In November 1964 Detachment 1 (provisional) equipped with improved HH-43Fs replaced the 2 HH-43Bs at NKP.

The 5th Tactical Control Group exercised command jurisdiction over the 507th until May 1965 when the 6235th Air Base Squadron was formed. Overall control of the USAF units was then turned over to the 35th Tactical Group at Don Muang Royal Thai Air Force Base. On 8 April 1966 the 6235th Air Base Squadron was discontinued and the 634th Combat Support Group along with its subordinate squadrons was activated.

On 6 July 1965 2 CH-3Cs assigned to Detachment 1 of the 38th Air Rescue Squadron arrived at NKP improving the rescue capacity there.

With U.S. irregular warfare operations already being conducted from the base, on 2 February 1966, the Thai government approved the establishment of a USAF Air Commando unit in Thailand, using the existing USAF facilities at NKP to give the appearance that the United States was not introducing another unit into Thailand. USAF forces at NKP were under the overall command of the United States Pacific Air Forces (PACAF).

NKP initially housed USAF search and rescue forces and maintained a communications capability in support of U.S. Air Force objectives in Southeast Asia. NKP was the location of TACAN station "Channel 89" and was referenced by that identifier in voice communications during air missions. The 634th Combat Support Group was inactivated and the 56th Air Commando Wing was formed on 8 April 1967. The 606th Air Commando Squadron formed the operational backbone of the new wing, and the 56th Combat Support Group took over the major support functions. The 56th Air Commando Wing designation was changed to 56th Special Operations Wing on 1 August 1968.

Along with USAF Air Commando and Special Operations forces, MACV-SOG units operated out of NKP, along with Air America, Echo 31 and other clandestine organizations which used NKP as an operating base for their activities in Laos, Cambodia and North Vietnam.

Only older propeller driven aircraft and specialized aircraft operated from the installation. Some of the aircraft operating out of NKP bore civilian markings or were unmarked. In addition, the 56h SOW also worked closely with the U.S. embassies in Laos and Thailand to provide training for special air warfare units.

=== Squadrons of the 56th SOW ===
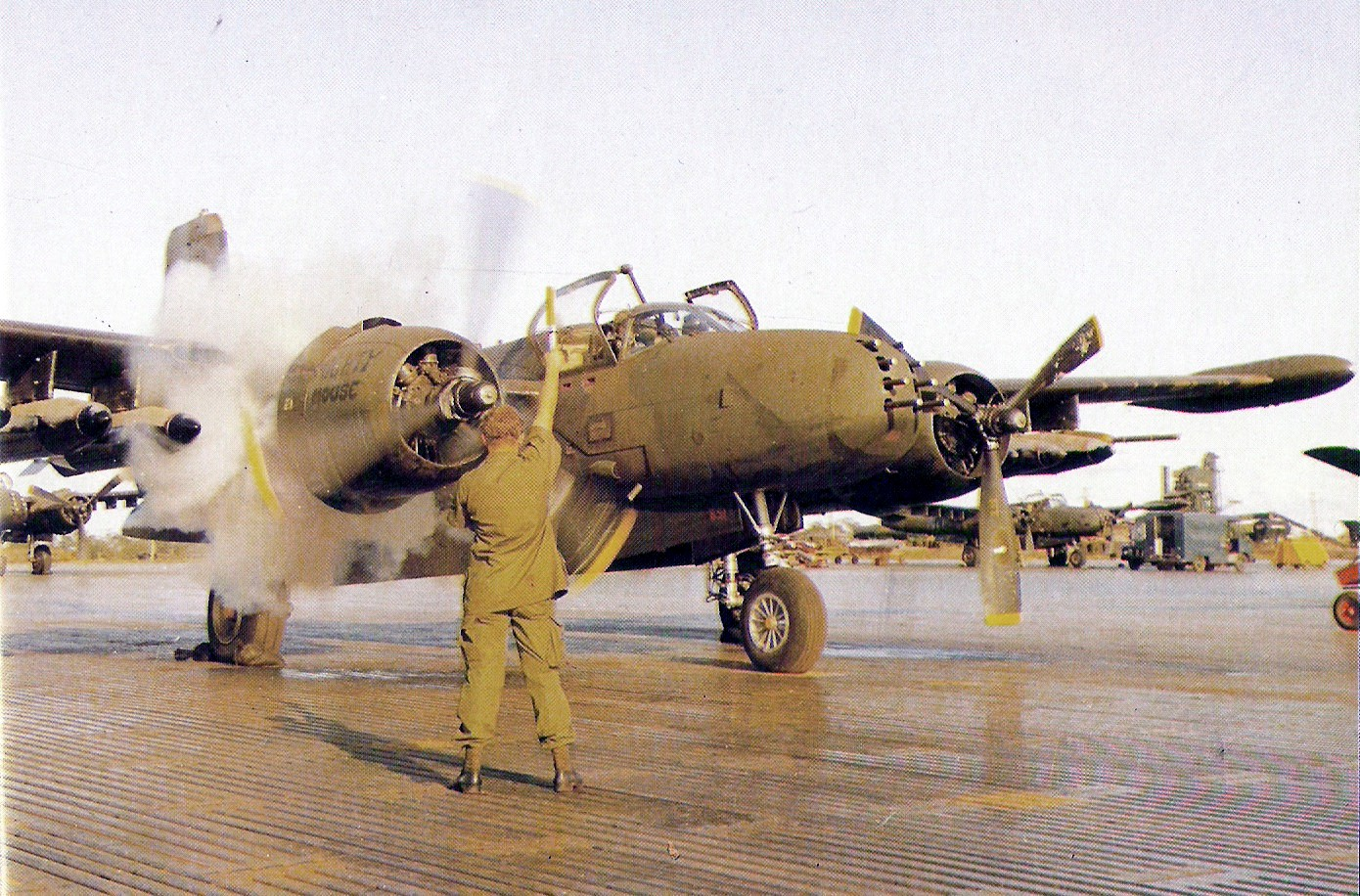
A 609th SOS B-26K/A-26A starting engines in 1969

==== Special Operations Squadrons ====
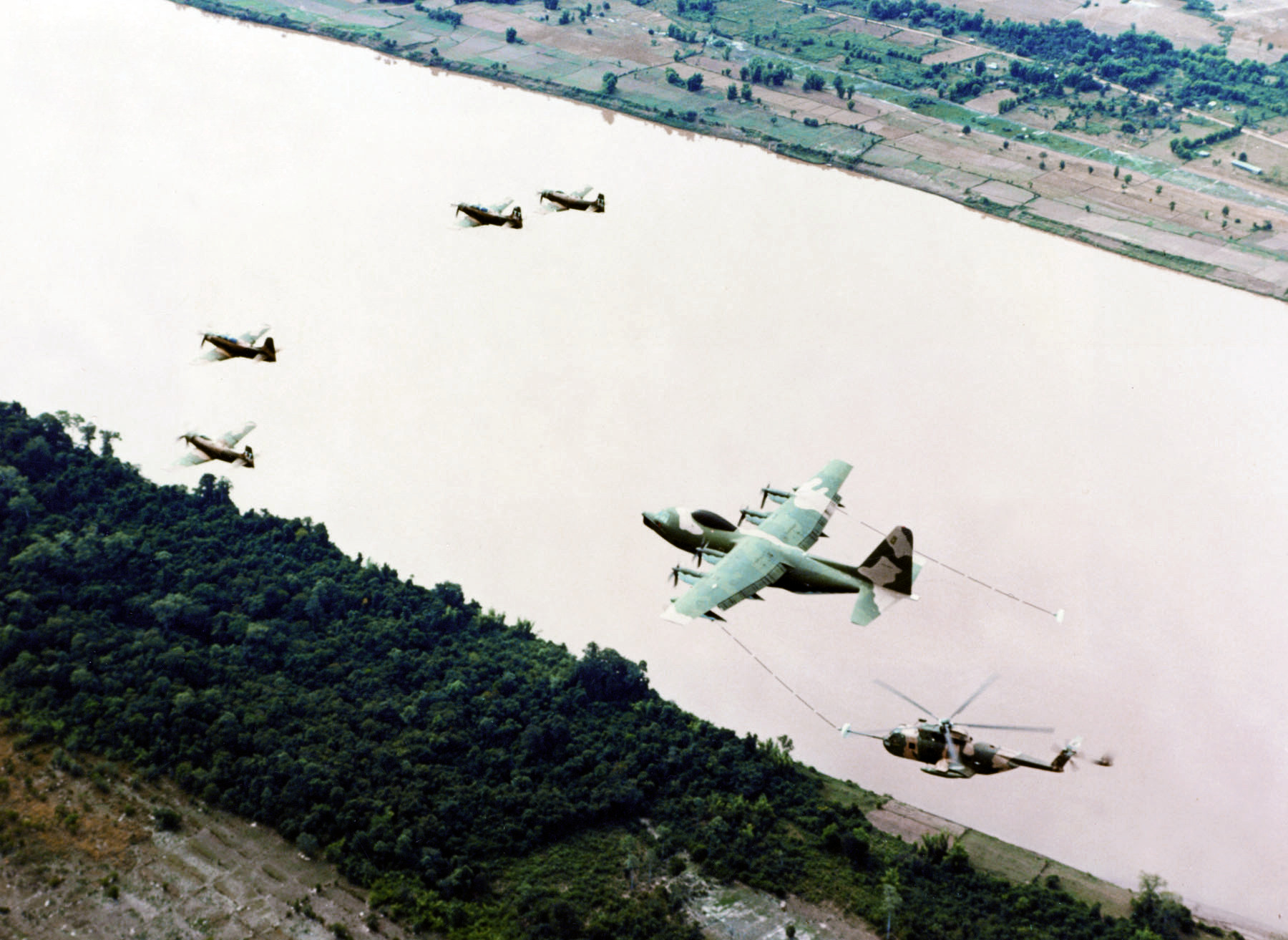
U.S. Air Force air rescue team: Four NKP based A-1 Skyraiders and a Lockheed HC-130P Hercules recovery aircraft refueling a Sikorsky HH-3E Jolly Green Giant helicopter

- 1st Air Commando Squadron (redesignated 1st Special Operations Squadron 1 August 1968), 20 December 1967 - 15 December 1972, call sign Hobo:(A-1E/G/H/J, Tail Code: TC)
- 18th Special Operations Squadron 25 August 1971 - 31 December 1972, call sign Stinger:(AC–119, Tail Code: EH)
- 21st Helicopter Squadron (redesignated 21st Special Operations Squadron 1 August 1968), 27 November 1967 - 30 June 1975, call signs Dusty & Knife:(CH-3C/E, CH-53E)
- 22d Air Commando Squadron 25 October 1968 - 30 September 1970, call sign Zorro:(A-1E/G/H/J, Tail Code: TS)
- 602d Air Commando Squadron (redesignated 602d Special Operations Squadron 1 August 1968), 8 April 1967 - 31 December 1970, call sign Sandy/Firefly:(A-1E/H/J, Tail Code: TT)
- 606th Air Commando Squadron (redesignated 606th Special Operations Squadron 1 August 1968), 8 April 1967 - 15 June 1971, call sign: Candlesticks (C-123 Flareships) and Loudmouth/Litterbugs (U-10D, C-123B, T-28D, Tail Code: TO)
- 609th Air Commando Squadron (redesignated 609th Special Operations Squadron 1 August 1968), 15 September 1967 - 1 December 1969, call sign Nimrod:(A-26A/K, T-28D, UC/C-123K, Tail Code: TA)

==== Forward Air Control Squadron ====
- 23d Tactical Air Support Squadron 15 April 1966 - 22 September 1975, call sign Nail: (O-1, O-2, OV-10)

==== Other USAF Squadrons ====
- 460th Reconnaissance Squadron 15 December 1970 - 30 September 1972 (EC-47N/P)
- 554th Reconnaissance Squadron 15 December 1970 - 30 September 1972, call sign Vampire: (QU-22B)
- 361st Tactical Electronic Warfare Squadron 1 September 1972 - 30 June 1974 (EC-47)

==== United States Navy ====
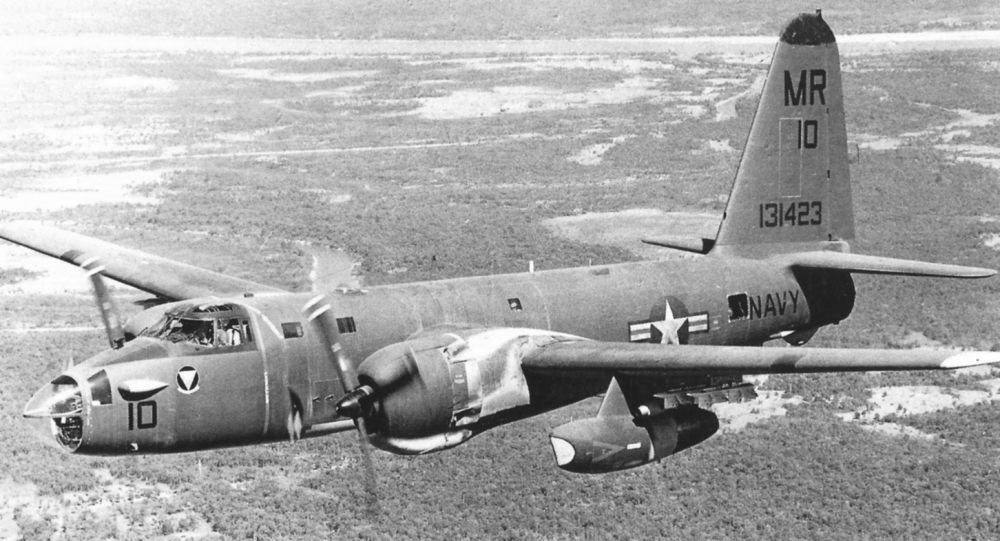
Lockheed OP-2E Neptune of observation squadron VO-67 on a mission over Laos in 1967/68

- Observation Squadron 67 (VO-67) February 1967 - July 1968, operating OP-2E aircraft as part of Operation Igloo White implanting sensors at low levels. Tail code MR (Mud River).

=== Tenant Units ===
- 38th Aerospace Rescue and Recovery Squadron (redesignated 38th Aerospace Rescue and Recovery Squadron on 8 January 1966) 6 July 1965 call sign Jolly Green operating CH-3C/E, HH-3E and HH-53E helicopters.
- 40th Aerospace Rescue and Recovery Squadron 18 March 1968 - 1 October 1975 operating HH-3s, HH-43s, HH-53B/C and HC-130Ps.
- 1987th Communications Squadron, 1974 Communications Group, Air Force Communications Service, from 1 June 1966;
- 621st Tactical Control Squadron, Detachment 5, Invert
- Task Force Alpha (Operation Igloo White signal processing center)
- 10th Weather Squadron Military Airlift Command (MAC)
- 56th Combat Support Group
- 456th Munitions Maintenance Squadron
- 6994th Security Squadron
- 6908th Security Squadron
- 6th Aerial Port Squadron (MAC) (Detachment) DET4 6 APS
- 621st Tactical Control Squadron (Detachment)
- RED HORSE Squadron

Decorations bestowed on the 56th SOW were:

- Presidential Unit Citation (Southeast Asia): 1 November 1968 – 1 May 1969; 1 October 1969 – 30 April 1970; 1 April 1972 – 22 February 1973.
- Air Force Outstanding Unit Award with Combat "V" Device: 1 December 1970 – 30 November 1971: 1 December 1971 – 29 February 1972; 23 February 1973 – 28 February 1974; 23 January 1975 - 30 April 1975.
- Republic of Vietnam Gallantry Cross with Palm: 8 April 1967 – 28 January 1973.

=== US Support Activities Group and 7th Air Force ===
Under the terms of the Paris Peace Accords, Military Assistance Command Vietnam (MACV) and all American and third country forces had to be withdrawn from South Vietnam within 60 days of the ceasefire. A multi-service organization was required to plan for the application of U.S. air and naval power into North or South Vietnam, Cambodia or Laos, should this be required and ordered. Called the United States Support Activities Group & 7th Air Force (USSAG/7th AF), it was to be located at Nakhon Phanom. In addition a small U.S. military headquarters was needed to continue the military assistance program for the South Vietnamese military and supervise the technical assistance still required to complete the goals of Vietnamization and also to report operational and military intelligence through military channels to DOD authorities. This headquarters was to become the Defense Attache Office, Saigon.

The advance echelon of USSAG/7AF moved from Tan Son Nhut Air Base to Nakhon Phanom on 29 January 1973. Transfer of the main body, drawn largely from the operations and intelligence sections of MACV and Seventh Air Force, began on 10 February. USSAG was activated on 11 February 1973 under the command of commander of MACV, but at 08:00 on 15 February, USAF General John W. Vogt Jr., as USSAG/7AF commander, took over from MACV control of American air operations. U.S. air support operations into Cambodia continued under USSAG/7th AF until August 1973. The DAO was established as a subsidiary command of MACV and remained under the command of commander of MACV until the deactivation of MACV on 27 March 1973 at which time command passed to the Commander USSAG/Seventh Air Force at Nakhon Phanom.

=== Major operations involving NKP ===
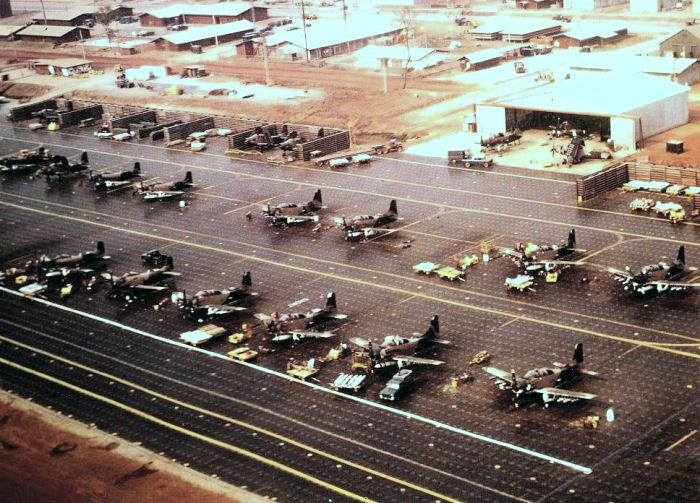
Douglas A-1E and A-1H Skyraiders of the 1st SOS and the 602nd SOS at NKP

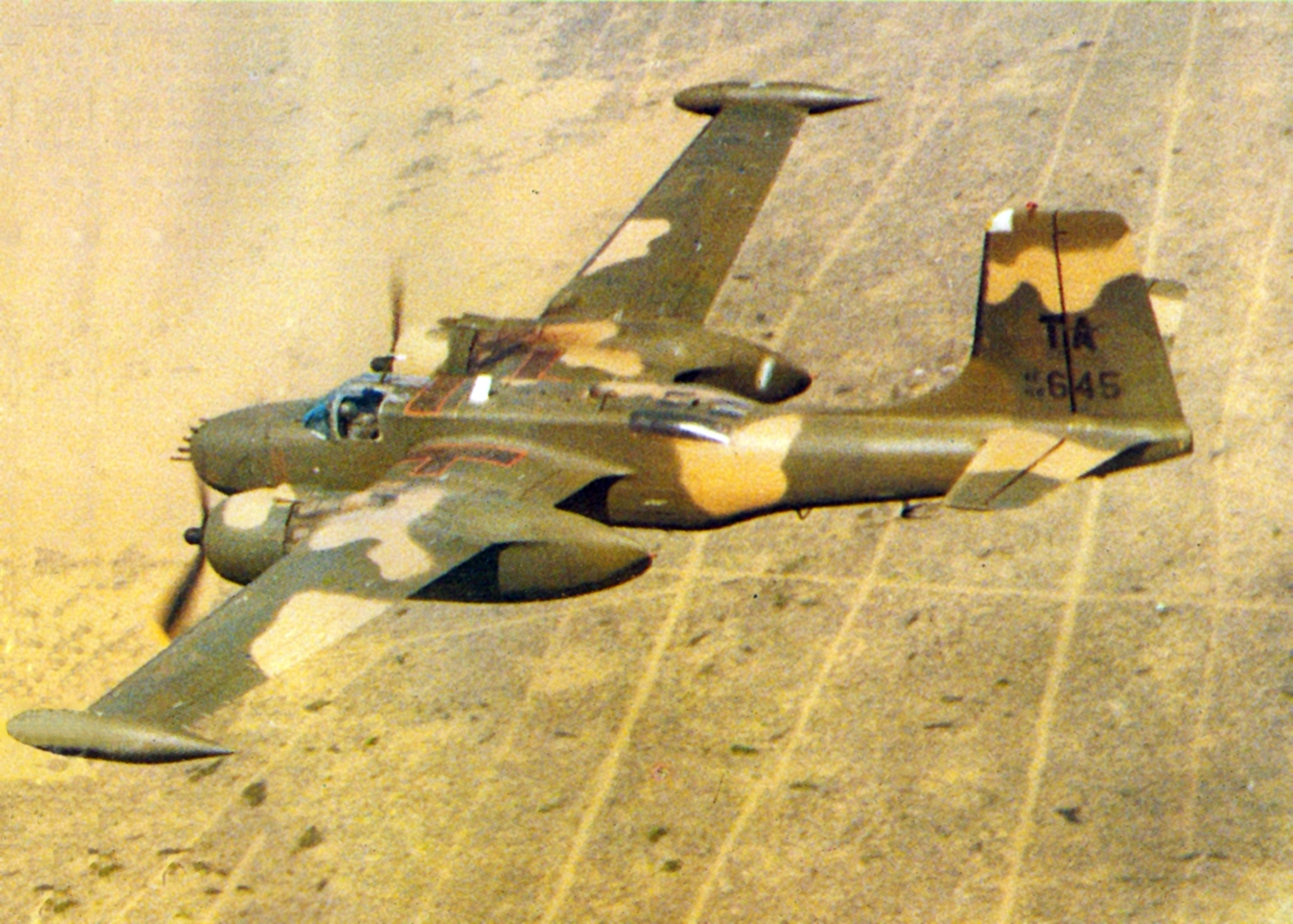
A-26 Invader of the 609th SOS, 1969

==== Operation Barrel Roll ====
Operation Barrel Roll was a covert USAF 2nd Air Division (later Seventh Air Force) and U.S. Navy Task Force 77, interdiction and close air support campaign conducted in Laos between 14 December 1964 and 29 March 1973 concurrent with the Vietnam War. The initial purpose of the operation was to serve as a signal to North Vietnam to cease its support for the Viet Cong insurgency in South Vietnam. The operation became increasingly involved in providing close air support to the Royal Lao Armed Forces, CIA-backed Hmong forces, and Thai Army elements in a covert ground war in northern and northeastern Laos. The US pulled out of Laos in early 1973 as part of the Paris Peace Accords and the Case–Church Amendment of June 1973 prevented any further US military activity in Laos, Cambodia and Vietnam without Congressional approval.

==== Operation Ivory Coast ====
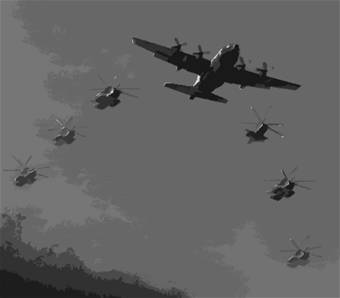
Son Tay Raiders - 1970

NKP was one of the staging bases for the failed Sơn Tây prison camp POW rescue mission in November 1970. Its objective was the rescue of approximately 90 American Prisoners of War from the camp. The attempted rescue itself was a failure as the prisoners had been moved some months before.

==== The Mayaguez incident ====
On 13 May 1975, US Seventh Air Force commander Lieutenant General John J. Burns and his staff developed a contingency plan to retake the SS Mayaguez using an assault force composed of men of the Nakhon Phanom 56th Security Police Squadron. Seventy-five volunteers from the 56th would be dropped onto the containers on the decks of the Mayaguez on the morning of 14 May. In preparation for this assault five HH-53s and seven CH-53s were ordered to proceed to U-Tapao Royal Thai Navy Airfield for staging. At approximately 21:30, one of the 21st SOS CH-53s (AF Ser. No. 68-10933, call sign Knife 13) crashed, killing 18 security police and the five man flight crew.

=== Palace Lightning - USAF Withdrawal ===
With the collapse in Laos, the fall of both Cambodia and South Vietnam in April 1975 and in the aftermath of the unauthorized use of Thai bases during the Mayaguez incident, the political climate between Washington and Bangkok began to sour, and the Thai Government demanded that the U.S. remove the bulk of its forces out of Thailand by the end of the year. Under operation Palace Lightning, the USAF began to withdraw its aircraft and personnel from Thailand. Following a directive from the Joint Chiefs of Staff, CINCPAC on 11 June 1975 directed the disestablishment of USSAG/7th AF. The disestablishment was effective at 17:00 on 30 June. With the disestablishment of USSAG/7th AF control of the Four Party Joint Military Team established under the Paris Peace Accords, the Joint Casualty Resolution Center and the residual Defense Attaché Office reverted to CINCPAC. On 30 June 1975 the 56th Special Operations Wing was inactivated and the 656th Special Operations Wing was activated as a placeholder unit at NKP until the USAF could complete its withdrawal. The Search and Rescue units were among the last to leave Thailand. On 1 October 1975 the last USAF units left NKP with the 40th Aerospace Rescue and Recovery Squadron moving to Korat Royal Thai Air Force Base and the 3d Aerospace Rescue and Recovery Group moving to U-Tapao.

== Accidents and incidents ==
- On 21 November 1972, USAF Douglas EC-47Q, AF Ser. No. 43-49771 of the 361st Tactical Electronic Warfare Squadron crashed killing two of the 10 people on board. It had flown a tactical mission under the call sign Baron 56, and had taken off at about 10:44 local time (03:44 UTC). At 17:00, the aircraft was returning from the mission when it bounced on landing and started to depart the left side of the runway. The pilot over-corrected, causing the aircraft to depart to the right of the runway. Although a go-around was initiated, the aircraft hit trees damaging the port propeller. The co-pilot considered that the starboard engine was failing and that engine's propeller was feathered. The aircraft then crashed into another bank of trees 2 nautical miles (3.7 km) beyond the end of the runway. The wrecked aircraft was destroyed in the post-crash fire.

== See also ==
- United States Air Force In Thailand
- United States Pacific Air Forces
- United States Special Operations Command
- Air Force Special Operations Command
- Seventh Air Force
- Thirteenth Air Force

== Bibliography ==
- Glasser, Jeffrey D. (1998). The Secret Vietnam War: The United States Air Force in Thailand, 1961–1975. McFarland & Company. ISBN 0-7864-0084-6.
- Martin, Patrick (1994). Tail Code: The Complete History of USAF Tactical Aircraft Tail Code Markings. Schiffer Military Aviation History. ISBN 0-88740-513-4.
- Robbins, Christopher (1985) Air America. Avon, ISBN 0-380-89909-4
- Robbins, Christopher (1987) The Ravens: Pilots of the Secret War in Laos. Crown, ISBN 0-517-56612-5
- Warner, Roger (1998) Shooting at the Moon: The Story of America's Clandestine War in Laos. Steerforth, ISBN 1-883642-36-1
