= 606th Special Operations Squadron =

606th Special Operations Squadron
- Active: 1966-1971
- Country: United States
- Branch: United States Air Force
- Role: Special Operations
- Part of: Pacific Air Forces
- Decorations: Presidential Unit Citation; Air Force Outstanding Unit Award with Combat "V" Device; Vietnamese Gallantry Cross with Palm

Insignia
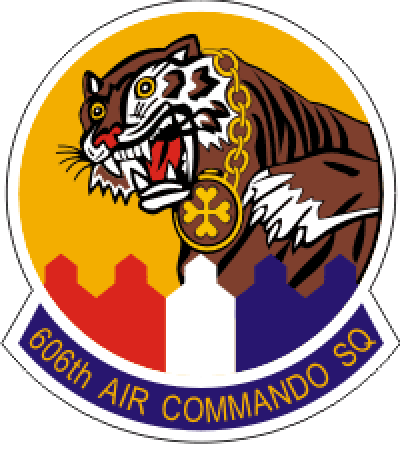
- 606th Air Commando Squadron emblem

The 606th Special Operations Squadron is an inactive unit of the United States Air Force. The squadron was first activated as the 606th Air Commando Squadron in March 1966 and stationed at Nakhon Phanom Royal Thai Air Force Base, Thailand. The squadron flew C-123 Provider and A-26A bomber aircraft over the Ho Chi Minh trail at night during the Vietnam War to interdict the movement of people and equipment. The squadron was inactivated on 30 June 1971.

== Organization ==
The 606th Special Forces Squadron was composed of two sections, the Fairchild C-123 Provider section which was under the call sign of "Candlestick", and the U-10 Helio Courier section which was under the call signs of "Loudmouth" and "Litterbugs" (and "Clown" for Civil Action missions).

== History ==
C-123s had been used in Vietnam since 1962 to drop flares for night interdiction missions, but their use declined after the introduction of the Douglas AC-47 Spooky in the country. The continued need for flare drop aircraft continued for operations over Laos, and in the spring of 1966, Pacific Air Forces activated the 606th Air Commando Squadron at Nakhon Phanom Royal Thai Air Force Base, Thailand and equipped it with UC-123Bs to continue this mission. (Note: Anthony calls the 606th a "flare-dedicated" unit, but it was a composite unit from first organization. Anthony, p. 81.)

Although starting out as a flare support flight, the UC-123s had added night reconnaissance and forward air control, which became its primary missions by 1968. The squadron flew from four to nine night reconnaissance missions per night over the Steel Tiger and Barrel Roll areas of Laos, flying in shifts to provide coverage throughout the night. After a lack of success with the use of starlight scopes in T-28s, a locally manufactured mount was designed and mounted near the Provider's escape hatch, which enabled an observer to sweep the area below the plane for targets. "Candlestick" flare and reconnaissance planes then teamed up with "Zorro" T-28s or "Nimrod' Douglas A-26 Invaders strike aircraft as a hunter killer team.

By 1969, heavy antiaircraft fire proved a problem for the "Candlestick" aircraft, which had upgraded to the UC-123K. The unit improvised a defense using chaff, which was manually thrown out the floor hatch to confuse enemy radars. The "Candlestick" operation ended when the squadron was inactivated in June 1971.

North American T-28 Trojans, call sign "Zorro" also flew with the 606th. Twelve of them moved to Nakhon Phanom in June 1966 along with Douglas A-26 Invader "Nimrods". After being credited with 67 truck strikes during the week of 2 through 9 November 1966, a detachment of Douglas A-26 Invader "Nimrods" was attached to the 606th. In September 1967, this detachment plus the T-28 "Zorro" forward air controllers were spun off into the 609th Special Operations Squadron.

== Lineage ==
- Constituted as the 606th Air Commando Squadron, Composite and activated on 12 January 1966 (not organized)

Organized on 8 March 1966

- Redesignated 606th Special Operations Squadron on 1 August 1968

Inactivated on 15 June 1971

=== Assignments ===
- Pacific Air Forces, 12 January 1966 (not organized)
- Thirteenth Air Force, 8 March 1966 (attached to 2d Air Division)
- 634th Combat Support Group, 8 April 1966
- 56th Air Commando Wing (later 56th Special Operations Wing), 8 April 1967 - 15 June 1971

=== Stations ===
- Nakhon Phanom Royal Thai Air Force Base, 8 March 1966 - 15 June 1971

=== Aircraft ===
- Fairchild UC-123B
- Fairchild UC-123K
- North American T-28 Trojan
- Helio U-10 Courier

=== Awards and campaigns ===
Award streamer	Award	Dates	Notes
	Presidential Unit Citation	1 November 1967-30 Sep 1968	606th Air Commando Squadron (later 606th Special Operations Squadron)
	Presidential Unit Citation	1 November 1968-1 May 1969	606th Special Operations Squadron
	Presidential Unit Citation	1 October 1969 - 30 April 1970	606th Special Operations Squadron
	Air Force Outstanding Unit Award with Combat "V" Device	1 October 1968-30 September 1969	606th Special Operations Squadron
	Air For**ce Outstanding Unit Award with Combat "V" Device	1 December 1970-15 June 1971	606th Special Operations Squadron
	Vietnamese Gallantry Cross with Palm	1 April 1966-1 August 1968	606th Air Commando Squadron (Note: The Gallantry Cross is listed as two awards in AF Pamphlet 900-2, but was probably a single award listed under the squadron's two designations.)
	Vietnamese Gallantry Cross with Palm	1 August 1968 1968-15 June 1971	606th Special Operations Squadron

Campaign Streamer	Campaign	Dates	Notes
	Vietnam Air	8 March 1966 – 28 June 1966	606th Air Commando Squadron
	Vietnam Air Offensive	29 June 1966 – 8 March 1967	606th Air Commando Squadron
	Vietnam Air Offensive, Phase II	9 March 1967 – 31 March 1968	606th Air Commando Squadron
	Vietnam Air/Ground	22 January 1968 – 7 July 1968	606th Air Commando Squadron
	Vietnam Air Offensive, Phase III	1 April 1968 – 31 October 1968	606th Air Commando Squadron (later 606th Special Operations Squadron)
	Vietnam Air Offensive, Phase IV	1 November 1968 – 22 February 1969	606th Special Operations Squadron
	Tet 1969/Counteroffensive	23 February 1969 – 8 June 1969	606th Special Operations Squadron
	Vietnam Summer-Fall 1969	9 June 1969 – 31 October 1969	606th Special Operations Squadron
	Vietnam Winter-Spring 1970	3 November 1969 – 30 April 1970	606th Special Operations Squadron
	Sanctuary Counteroffensive	1 May 1970 – 30 June 1970	606th Special Operations Squadron
	Southwest Monsoon	1 July 1970 – 30 November 1970	606th Special Operations Squadron
	Commando Hunt V	1 December 1970 – 14 May 1971	606th Special Operations Squadron
	Commando Hunt VI	15 May 1971 – 15 June 1971	606th Special Operations Squadron
