= Wayne Fisk =

US Air Force pararescueman

- Born: April 6, 1945 (age 81); Waldport, Oregon, U.S.
- Military career
- Allegiance: United States
- Branch: United States Air Force
- Service years: 1966–1993
- Rank: Chief Master Sergeant
- Conflicts: Vietnam War; Mayagüez incident
- Awards: Silver Star (2); Defense Superior Service Medal; Legion of Merit; Distinguished Flying Cross (2); Meritorious Service Medal (2); Air Medal (18); Air Force Commendation Medal (2); Air Force Achievement Medal (2)

Chief Master Sergeant Wayne Fisk (born April 6, 1945) is a retired United States Air Force pararescueman. He was involved in Operation Ivory Coast, the raid on the Son Tay prisoner of war camp, and later the rescue of the crew of the SS Mayagüez. When the Mayagüez was hijacked by Cambodian Communist forces in May 1975, Fisk was a member of the assault force that successfully recovered the ship and the entrapped United States Marines. For his actions, he was awarded his second Silver Star.

Concluding the Mayagüez mission, Fisk was recognized as the last American serviceman to engage Communist forces in ground combat in Southeast Asia. In 1979, he was the first Air Force enlisted recipient of the US Jaycees Ten Outstanding Young Men of America. In 1986, he became the first director of the Air Force Enlisted Heritage Hall on Maxwell AFB-Gunter Annex.

== Early life ==
Wayne Fisk was born in Waldport, Oregon, on April 6, 1945, and raised on the Oregon Coast. In high school, Wayne was a member of the honor society, an award-winning cadet in the Alaska Civil Air Patrol, and he even turned down an appointment to the United States Air Force Academy to care for his terminally ill mother. In March 1966, Fisk enlisted in the Air Force and was accepted for pararescue training.

== Air Force career ==
In 1967, Fisk served at Eglin AFB, Florida, until assigned to the 40th Aerospace Rescue and Recovery Squadron (40th ARRS) at Udorn Royal Thai Air Force Base, Thailand, performing combat rescue missions in both Laos and North Vietnam. One year later, he transferred to Kindley Air Force Base, Bermuda, as a member of the Air Force primary recovery team for Apollo missions 8, 9 and 10.

After only 11 months in Bermuda, Fisk voluntarily returned to Southeast Asia for two more consecutive tours with the 37th Aerospace Rescue and Recovery Squadron. It was during this time that then-Staff Sergeant Fisk participated in Operation Ivory Coast, the raid on the Son Tay prisoner of war camp, in November 1970 and received the Silver Star for his actions. From 1972 to 1974, he instructed at the USAF Pararescue School at Hill AFB, Utah, and was honored as the training wing's outstanding NCO instructor.

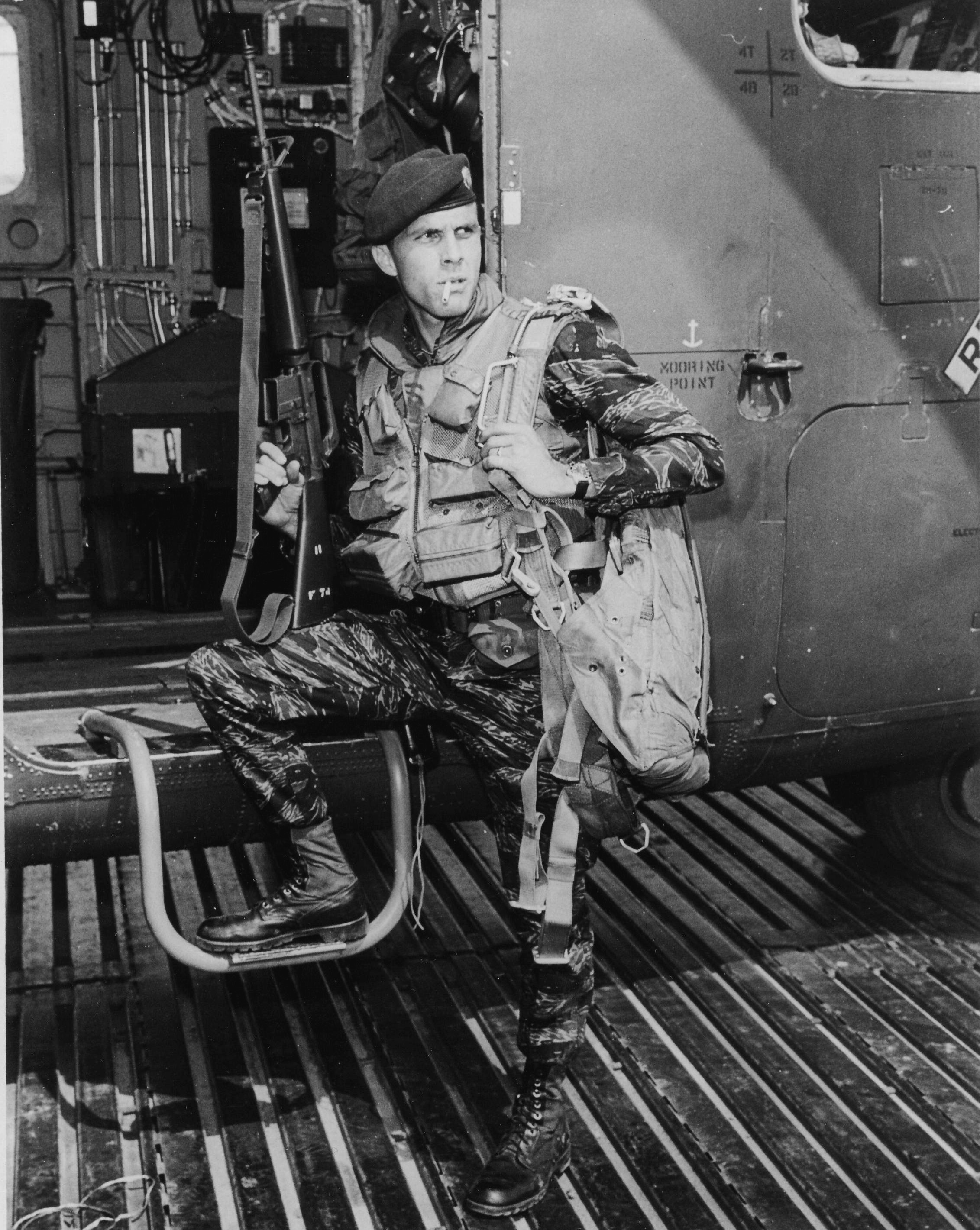
Fisk preparing to board a 40th ARRS CH-53

Fisk later returned to the 40th ARRS in Thailand as a technical sergeant and participated in Operation Eagle Pull, the evacuation of Phnom Penh, Cambodia. In May 1975, when Cambodian communist forces hijacked the Mayagüez in what came to be known as the Mayaguez incident. Fisk, flying aboard Knife 51, a 21st Special Operations Squadron CH-53, was a member of the assault force that successfully recovered the ship, attempted to rescue the crew, and liberated the entrapped US Marines. Knife 51 was the last helicopter to evacuate the Marines from Koh Tang and Fisk was the last Air Force serviceman to leave the ground, having combed the beach for stragglers. Fisk received his second Silver Star for this operation.

In January 1976, Fisk moved to Clark AB, Philippines, to be an Assistant Team Chief, Team Chief, and Acting First Sergeant for Det 1, 33 Aerospace Rescue and Recovery Service (AARS). In 1979, Fisk was honored as the first USAF enlisted man named to the US Jaycees Ten Outstanding Young Men of America, the Military Airlift Command's Senior NCO of the Year, the US Air Force's Outstanding Airman in the Philippines; and a recipient of the Air Force Association's Citation of Honor. In October 1979 Fisk worked at Headquarters, Aerospace Rescue and Recovery Service, Scott AFB, Illinois, as the Pararescue Standardization and Evaluation Flight Examiner.

After a parachute injury in 1980, Fisk left pararescue duty to serve as an instructor at the USAF Senior Noncommissioned Officer Academy, Gunter AFS, Alabama. As a newly minted chief master sergeant, Fisk led the effort to establish the USAF Enlisted Heritage Hall and later became the director. His final Air Force assignment came when he was assigned as the Operations Coordinator in the Defense Attache Office, Embassy of the United States of America, Ottawa, Canada.

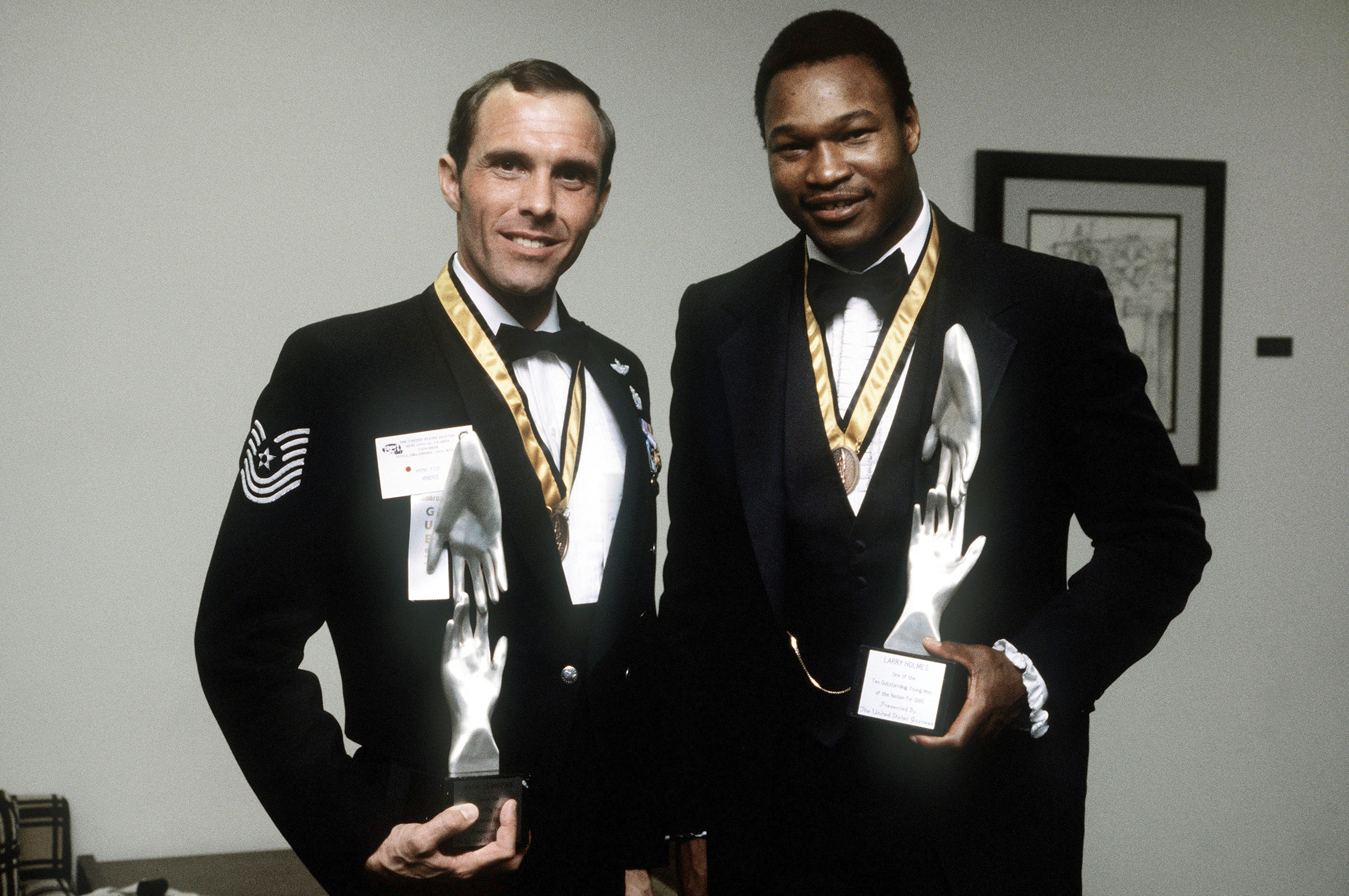
Fisk (on the left) and Larry Holmes with their US Jaycees trophies, in Tulsa, Oklahoma in 1979.

Fisk's awards and decorations include the Silver Star with oak leaf cluster, the Defense Superior Service Medal, the Legion of Merit, the Distinguished Flying Cross with oak leaf cluster, the Meritorious Service Medal with oak leaf cluster, and the Air Medal with 18 oak leaf clusters.

Fisk is married to the former Angelina Arceo from the Philippines. According to some sources, he is the father of the Pararescue tradition of getting tattoos of green footprints on one's buttocks.

In May 2023 Fisk received the United States Special Operations Command's Bull Simons Award.

== Military awards and decorations ==

Master Parachutist Badge
Silver Star		Defense Superior Service Medal
Legion of Merit	Distinguished Flying Cross w/ Combat "V"	Meritorious Service Medal
Air Medal (19 total awards)	Air Medal	Commendation Medal
Achievement Medal	Presidential Unit Citation	Joint Meritorious Unit Award
Outstanding Unit Award	Organizational Excellence Award	Navy Unit Commendation
Combat Readiness Medal	Good Conduct Medal	Outstanding Airman of the Year Ribbon
National Defense Service Medal	Armed Forces Expeditionary Medal	Vietnam Service Medal
Humanitarian Service Medal	Air Force Overseas Short Tour Service Ribbon	Air Force Overseas Long Tour Service Ribbon
Air Force Longevity Service Award	NCO PME Graduate Ribbon	Small Arms Expert Marksmanship Ribbon
Air Force Training Ribbon	Vietnam Gallantry Cross	Vietnam Campaign Medal
Air Force Scuba Diver insignia
