= Robert P. Coogan =

American vice admiral (1922–2015)

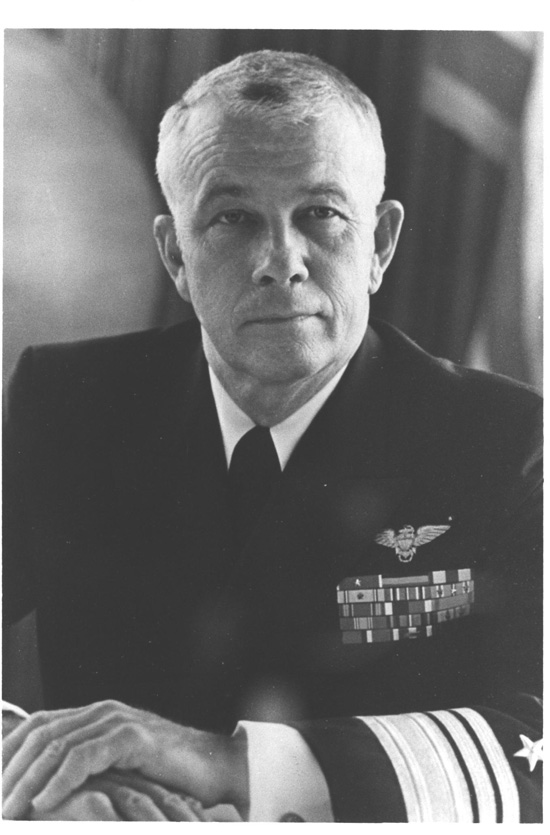
- VADM Robert P. Coogan
- Born: April 1, 1922; Newport, Rhode Island
- Died: March 9, 2015 (aged 92); San Diego, California
- Military career
- Allegiance: United States of America
- Branch: United States Navy
- Service years: 1943–1980
- Rank: Vice admiral
- Commands: Commander, Naval Air Forces; Third Fleet; Carrier Task Force 73, US 7th Fleet; USS Shangri-La (CV-38); USS Tolovana (AO-64)

Robert Paul Coogan (April 1, 1922 – March 9, 2015) was a vice admiral in the United States Navy who served as its Commander, Naval Air Forces from 1976 to 1980 and Third Fleet from 1975 to 1976. Coogan also served as commanding officer of both USS Shangri-La (CV-38) and USS Tolovana (AO-64), commander of Task Force 73, directing Navy actions during the Mayaguez incident in 1975, as well as commandant of midshipmen at the United States Naval Academy from 1969 until 1971. He was born in Newport, Rhode Island. After leaving the navy, Coogan worked as president of Aerojet. In his later years, he resided in San Diego, California, where he died in 2015 at the age of 92.
