= Mayaguez incident =

Last battle of American involvement in Southeast Asia

- Part of the aftermath of Cambodian Civil War
- The wreckage of U.S. Air Force CH-53 helicopters Knife 23 (left) and Knife 31 (right), shot down during the battle, lying on Koh Tang's East Beach shortly after the battle
Date	12–15 May 1975; 51 years ago
Location	Koh Tang, Democratic Kampuchea
Result	Khmer Rouge victory: Successful release of SS Mayaguez and crew

Belligerents
United States	Democratic Kampuchea

Commanders and leaders
Randall W. Austin	Em Son

Units involved
1st Battalion, 4th Marines; 2nd Battalion, 9th Marines; 21st Special Operations Squadron; 40th Aerospace Rescue and Recovery Squadron; 56th Aerospace Rescue and Recovery Squadron; 23rd Tactical Air Support Squadron; USS Henry B. Wilson; USS Gridley; USS Harold E. Holt; USS Coral Sea Carrier Air Wing 15	Khmer Rouge

Strength
300+	100+

Casualties and losses
38 killed 3 captured (later executed); 50 wounded 3 helicopters destroyed	13–25 killed on Koh Tang island Unknown killed on Swift boats and Cambodian mainland 4 Swift Boats sunk

The Mayaguez incident took place between Kampuchea (now Cambodia) and the United States from 12 to 15 May 1975, less than a month after the Khmer Rouge took control of the capital Phnom Penh, ousting the U.S.-backed Khmer Republic. After the Khmer Rouge seized the U.S. merchant vessel SS Mayaguez in a disputed maritime area, the U.S. mounted a hastily prepared rescue operation. U.S. Marines recaptured the ship and attacked the island of Koh Tang where it was believed that the crew were being held as hostages. Encountering stronger-than-expected defences on Koh Tang, three United States Air Force helicopters were destroyed during the initial assault and the Marines fought a desperate day-long battle with the Khmer Rouge before almost all were evacuated. The Mayaguez's crew were released unharmed by the Khmer Rouge shortly after the attack on Koh Tang began. The names of the Americans killed, including three marines left behind on Koh Tang after the battle and subsequently executed by the Khmer Rouge, are the last names on the Vietnam Veterans Memorial.

== Background ==
In 1939 during the French colonial period an administrative line was drawn between Cambodia and French Cochinchina known as the Brevie Line, named after then governor-general of French Indochina Jules Brévié. While not intended to determine sovereignty, the Brevie Line became the de facto maritime border between Cambodia and Vietnam. In 1967 Prince Norodom Sihanouk then Prime Minister of Cambodia agreed with North Vietnam that the borders of Cambodia and Vietnam were those drawn by the French in order to prevent any further Vietnamese claims on Cambodian territory.

Following the Fall of Phnom Penh on 17 April 1975 the Khmer Rouge moved to take control of all of Cambodia from the residual Khmer Republic forces. With the Fall of Saigon on 30 April 1975 the Khmer Rouge demanded that all People's Army of Vietnam (PAVN) and Viet Cong forces leave their base areas in Cambodia, but the PAVN refused to leave certain areas which they claimed were Vietnamese territory. The PAVN also moved to take control of a number of islands formerly controlled by the now-defunct South Vietnam and other territories and islands contested between Vietnam and Cambodia.

On 1 May 1975 Khmer Rouge forces landed on Phú Quốc which was claimed by Cambodia but controlled by South Vietnam. On 10 May the Khmer Rouge captured the Thổ Chu Islands, where they evacuated and later executed 500 Vietnamese civilians. The PAVN launched a counterattack evicting the Khmer Rouge from Phú Quốc and Thổ Chu and attacked Cambodia's Poulo Wai island.

As part of these island battles, the Khmer Navy actively patrolled Cambodian coastal waters both to stop Vietnamese incursions and also for fear that merchant ships could be used by the Central Intelligence Agency (CIA) to supply opponents of the new Khmer Rouge regime. On 2 May the Khmer Navy captured seven Thai fishing boats. On 4 May the Cambodians pursued a South Korean freighter after which the South Korean Transportation Ministry put out a warning about shipping in the area. On 7 May they held a Panamanian vessel near Poulo Wai and questioned its crew before releasing them and their ship after 36 hours. They fired on a Swedish vessel in the same area. On 12 May the Khmer Rouge sent a force to occupy Poulo Wai. Despite these actions no general warning was issued to U.S. merchant shipping.

Cambodia had claimed 12 nautical miles (22 km; 14 mi) of territorial waters since 1969 and had boarded ships on this basis. The U.S. did not recognize 12 nautical mile territorial waters claims in 1975, recognizing only 3 nautical miles (5.6 km; 3.5 mi), and categorized the waters near Poulo Wai as international sea lanes on the high seas.

== Khmer Rouge seize the Mayaguez ==
The crisis began on the afternoon of 12 May 1975, as the U.S. container ship SS Mayaguez, owned by Sea-Land Service Inc., passed nearby Poulo Wai en route from Hong Kong to Sattahip, Thailand. U.S. military reports state that the seizure took place 6 nautical miles (11 km; 6.9 mi) off the island, but crew members brought evidence in a later legal action that Mayaguez had sailed about 2 nautical miles (3.7 km; 2.3 mi) off Poulo Wai and was not flying a flag. Poulo Wai Island is located 60 miles off the coast from Sihanoukville and 32 miles from Koh Tang Island.

At 14:18, a Khmer Navy Swift Boat was sighted approaching the Mayaguez. The Khmer Rouge fired across the bow of Mayaguez and when Captain Charles T. Miller ordered the engine room to slow down to manoeuvring speed to avoid the machine-gun fire, the Khmer Rouge then fired a rocket-propelled grenade (RPG) across the bow of the ship. Miller ordered the transmission of an SOS and then stopped the ship. Seven Khmer Rouge soldiers boarded Mayaguez and their leader, Battalion Commander Sa Mean, pointed at a map indicating that the ship should proceed to the east of Poulo Wai.

One of the crew members broadcast a Mayday which was picked up by an Australian vessel. Mayaguez arrived off Poulo Wai at approximately 16:00 and another 20 Khmer Rouge boarded the vessel. Sa Mean indicated that Mayaguez should proceed to Ream on the Cambodian mainland, but Captain Miller showed that the ship's radar was not working and mimed the ship hitting rocks and sinking. Sa Mean radioed his superiors and was apparently instructed to stay at Poulo Wai, dropping anchor at 16:55.

Mayaguez was carrying 107 containers of routine cargo, 77 containers of government and military cargo, and 90 empty containers, all insured for $5 million (equivalent to $30 million in 2025). The Khmer Rouge never inspected the containers, and exact contents have not been disclosed, but Mayaguez had loaded containers from the U.S. Embassy in Saigon nine days before the fall of Saigon. The captain had a U.S. government letter only to be opened in certain emergency circumstances, which he destroyed.

== President Ford reacts ==
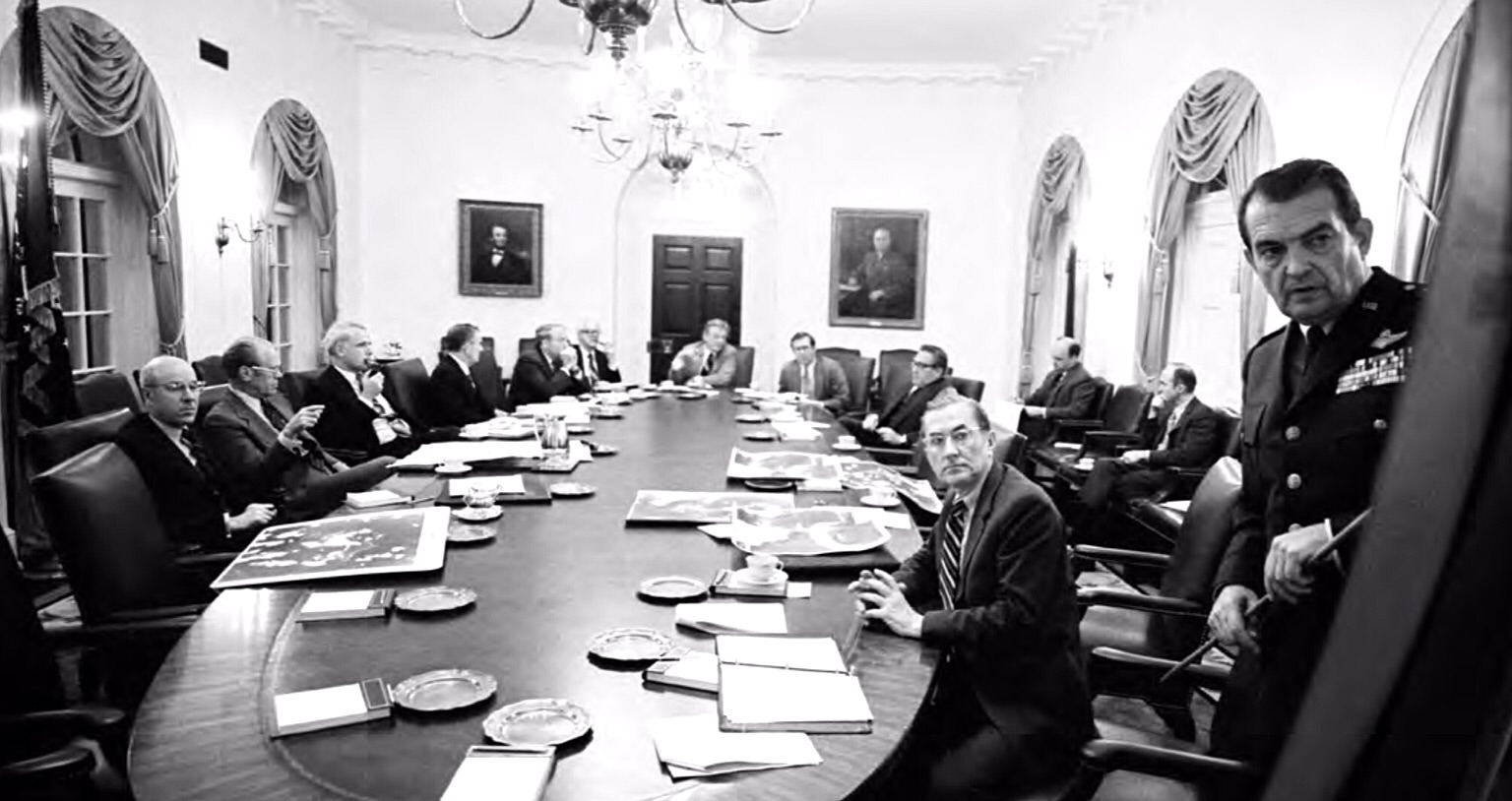
The acting Chairman of The Joint Chiefs of Staff, General David C. Jones (standing), briefs the National Security Council at The White House on possible military options during the second meeting on the Mayaguez crisis on 12 May 1975.

Mayaguez's SOS and Mayday signals were picked up by a number of listeners including an employee of Delta Exploration Company in Jakarta, Indonesia, who notified the U.S. Embassy in Jakarta. By 05:12 Eastern Daylight Time (EDT) the first news of the incident reached the National Military Command Center (NMCC) in Washington, D.C.

President Gerald Ford was informed of the seizure of Mayaguez at his morning briefing with his deputy assistant for national security affairs, Brent Scowcroft. At 12:05 EDT (23:05 Cambodia), a meeting of the National Security Council (NSC) was convened to discuss the situation. Meanwhile, the NMCC ordered Admiral Noel Gayler, Commander in Chief of the U.S. Pacific Command (CINCPAC), to launch reconnaissance aircraft to locate Mayaguez. The members of the NSC were determined to end the crisis decisively, believing that the fall of South Vietnam less than two weeks before, and the forced withdrawal of the United States from Cambodia (Operation Eagle Pull) and South Vietnam (Operation Frequent Wind) had severely damaged the U.S. reputation.

They also wished to avoid comparisons to the Pueblo incident of 1968, where the failure to promptly use military force to halt the capture of a U.S. intelligence ship by North Korea led to an eleven-month hostage situation. Vice President Nelson A. Rockefeller insisted that "this will be seen as a test case... judged in South Korea," saying further "I think a violent response is in order. The world should know that we will act and that we will act quickly." The Pueblo was not Secretary of State Henry Kissinger’s preferred historical analogy, however. Instead, he was thinking of the 1969 EC-121 shootdown by a North Korean military aircraft over the Sea of Japan. Kissinger thought the US reaction to the North Korean downing of the US Navy's EC-121 in international airspace with the loss of all 31 crewmen was exactly what they should avoid. Kissinger later told the security council members, "We assembled forces like crazy. But in the end, we did not do anything."

It was determined that keeping Mayaguez and her crew away from the Cambodian mainland was essential. Since the United States had no diplomatic contact with the Khmer Rouge regime in Cambodia, Ford instructed Kissinger to urge the People's Republic of China to persuade the Khmer Rouge to release Mayaguez and her crew.

Following the NSC meeting, the White House issued a press release stating that Ford considered the seizure an act of piracy, though this claim did not have a foundation in maritime law. Secretary of Defense James R. Schlesinger ordered the military to locate Mayaguez and prevent her movement to the Cambodian mainland, employing munitions (including tear gas and sea mines) if necessary.

Kissinger sent a message to the Chinese Liaison Office in Washington demanding the immediate release of Mayaguez and her crew, but the chief of the Liaison Office refused to accept the note. Kissinger then instructed George H. W. Bush, the head of the U.S. Liaison Office in Beijing, to deliver the note to the Chinese Foreign Ministry and to pass on an oral message that "The Government of the United States demands the immediate release of the vessel and of the full crew. If that release does not immediately take place, the authorities in Phnom Penh will be responsible for the consequences."

== U.S. rescue preparations ==
Following Schlesinger's instructions, P-3 Orion aircraft stationed at Naval Air Station (NAS) Cubi Point in the Philippines and at U-Tapao Royal Thai Navy Airfield in Thailand took off to locate Mayaguez. The aircraft carrier USS Coral Sea, then en route to Australia, was ordered into the area. The destroyer escort USS Harold E. Holt and the guided missile destroyer USS Henry B. Wilson were both ordered to proceed at high speed from the Philippine Sea towards Mayaguez's last known location.

An alert order was sent to 1st Battalion 4th Marines (1/4 Marines) at Subic Bay and to the 9th Marine Regiment on Okinawa. A reinforced company from 1/4 Marines was ordered to assemble at NAS Cubi Point for airlift to Thailand, while a 1,100-man Battalion Landing Team (BLT) assembled in Okinawa.

=== Locating and stopping Mayaguez ===
On the early morning of 13 May, the P-3 Orions identified large radar returns near Poulo Wai and dropped flares on the suspected location of Mayaguez provoking Khmer Rouge gunfire. Low on fuel, the two Orions returned to base and were replaced with another Orion from Patrol Squadron 17. At 08:16 local time the Orion made a low pass over Poulo Wai positively identifying Mayaguez and again drawing Khmer Rouge gunfire.

Shortly afterwards the Khmer Rouge leader, Sa Mean, ordered Captain Miller to get Mayaguez underway. At 08:45 Mayaguez set off towards the northeast following one of the Swift Boats. The Orion continued to track Mayaguez as it left Poulo Wai. Once the location of Mayaguez was identified, Admiral Gayler ordered the commander of the Seventh Air Force, Lieutenant General John J. Burns, at Korat Royal Thai Air Force Base, to move combat aircraft to the area.

At 13:00 two unarmed United States Air Force (USAF) F-111 fighter-bombers diverted from a training mission began making low-level high-speed passes by Mayaguez. Once the F-111s had left, Sa Mean ordered Captain Miller to follow the Swift Boats around Koh Tang and drop anchor approximately 1.5 km north of the island. Two F-4 Phantoms soon arrived over Mayaguez and began firing their 20 mm cannon into the water in front of the ship. The F-4s were followed by A-7D Corsairs and more F-111s which continued to fire into the sea in front of and behind the ship indicating that no further movement should be attempted.

At 16:15, the Khmer Rouge ordered Mayaguez's crew onto two fishing boats which then took them closer to the shore of Koh Tang.

=== U.S. forces assemble ===
U.S. Navy warships Coral Sea, Harold E. Holt and Henry B. Wilson were all scheduled to arrive on station by 15 May, but none of these ships carried any troops. USS Hancock carried a Marine contingent but could not arrive on station until 16 May, while USS Okinawa also carried Marines but could not arrive until 18 May.

III Marine Amphibious Force (III MAF) assigned Task Force 79.9 with recovering Mayaguez and designated D Company 1/4 Marines in the Philippines as the unit that would actually retake Mayaguez, but Burns wanted additional force and orders were sent to the 3rd Marine Division on Okinawa. 1st Battalion, 9th Marines (BLT 1/9) was then on alert as the primary "air contingency" reaction force, but most of BLT 1/9 were ending their tours of duty and were not subject to further extension of their tours except in the case of emergency. III MAF requested the extension of BLT 1/9's tour but this was refused.

The 2nd Battalion, 9th Marines (BLT 2/9) (commanded by Lieutenant Colonel Randall W. Austin) was then on a training exercise on Okinawa and it received orders on the night of 13 May to return to camp and prepare for departure by air at dawn on 14 May. On the morning of 14 May BLT 2/9 boarded USAF C-141s at Kadena Air Base to fly to Thailand. The 9th Marine Regiment had been the first U.S. ground combat force committed to the Vietnam War in 1965, but in May 1975 only a few of the officers and non-commissioned officers from BLT 2/9 had seen combat in Vietnam.

Nine USAF HH-53C Jolly Green helicopters of the 40th Aerospace Rescue and Recovery Squadron and 10 CH-53 Knives of the 21st Special Operations Squadron stationed at Nakhon Phanom Royal Thai Navy Base were available for the rescue operation. There were differences between the two types which would become relevant during the battle: the HH-53 was air-refuellable, had 450 US gallon (1,700 L; 370 imp gal) self-sealing fuel tip tanks, a tail minigun with armor plating, and two waist miniguns. The CH-53 was not air-refuellable, had 650 US gallon (2,500 L; 540 imp gal) tip tanks that lacked self-sealing and two waist miniguns. Thus, the HH-53s' fuel tanks were less vulnerable to ground fire and, with their refueling capability, could remain in the area of operations indefinitely, so long as they had access to aerial tanker support.

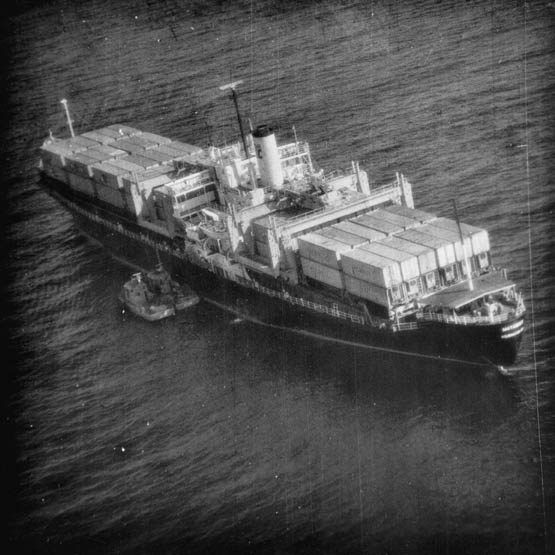
An aerial surveillance photo showing two Khmer Rouge Swift Boats during the initial seizing of the SS Mayaguez

On 13 May Burns and his Seventh Air Force staff developed a contingency plan to retake Mayaguez using an assault force composed of men of the USAF 56th Security Police Squadron. 75 volunteers from the 56th would be dropped onto the containers on the decks of Mayaguez on the morning of 14 May. In preparation for this assault five HH-53s and seven CH-53s were ordered to proceed to U-Tapao for staging. At approximately 21:15, one of the 21st SOS CH-53s (68-10933, call sign Knife 13) crashed en route to U Tapao, killing 18 security police and its five-man crew.

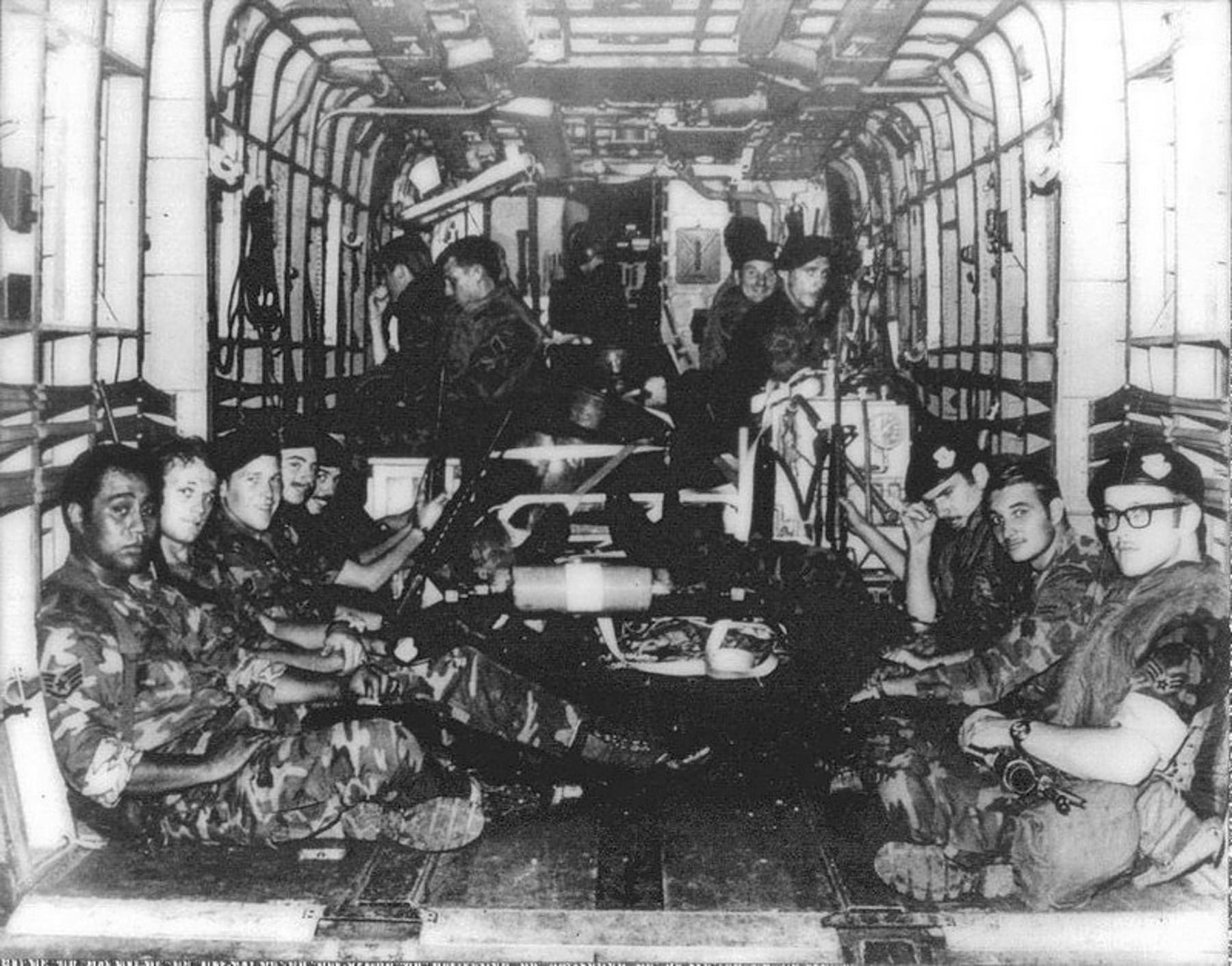
These 23 USAF Security Policemen were killed when their helicopter crashed due to a mechanical failure.

=== Third NSC meeting ===
Just before 05:00 EDT on 14 May a message arrived in the Department of State from the US embassy in Tehran. The subject line was "Chinese Embassy Tehran Believes Mayaguez to be Freed Soon." The Pakistani first secretary had told an American diplomat that a senior Chinese embassy official in Tehran said China was "embarrassed" by the Cambodian seizure of the Mayaguez and expected it to be released soon. The message was passed on to Kissinger who claimed it was of dubious reliability and it was not circulated among the NSC.

Ford chaired an NSC meeting at 10:22 EDT (21:22 Cambodia), where the Air Force rescue plan was cancelled due to the loss of Knife 13 and the fact that the containers on Mayaguez could not bear the weight of the helicopters while rappelling men down would expose them to gunfire. It was decided that it was necessary to wait for the Navy ships to arrive off Koh Tang and for the Marines to assemble in Thailand before a rescue attempt would be mounted. Ford ordered the Air Force to sink any Cambodian boats moving between Koh Tang and the mainland. Following this meeting Kissinger told Ford "This is your first crisis. You should establish a reputation for being too tough to tackle. This is a replay of the EC-121."

=== Boats interdicted ===
Early on the morning of 14 May, the Khmer Rouge loaded Mayaguez's crew onto one of the fishing boats and they left Koh Tang following two of the Swift Boats on a heading for Kampong Som. Two F-111s swept past the fishing boat, followed by a pair of F-4s and a pair of A-7s, which began firing in front of the Swift Boats and then directly at the Swift Boats, causing one of them to turn back to Koh Tang. The jets were then joined by an AC-130H Spectre gunship from the 388th Tactical Fighter Wing which proceeded to engage the second Swift Boat with its cannons.

An A-7D then sprayed the Swift Boat with its 20 mm cannon, sinking it. The fighters then came at the fishing boat dropping bombs and firing their cannon into the water in front of it, spraying the boat with shrapnel. The fighter crews reported back that 30 to 40 Caucasians had been seen on board the fishing boat. Despite Ford's order to sink all boats, the jets sought orders from higher command.

=== Fourth NSC meeting ===
In Washington, Ford convened another NSC meeting at 22:30 EDT (09:30 14 May Cambodia). A communication link had been established between the White House, Seventh Air Force at Nakhon Phanom, CINCPAC in Hawaii and the aircraft circling above Koh Tang allowing for near real-time communications. The circling fighters reported that they could try to shoot the rudder off the fishing boat to stop its progress to Kampong Som, but the NSC decided that the risk of killing Mayaguez crew was too great. At 23:00 EDT (10:00 Cambodia) Ford ordered that only tear gas should be dropped on or near the fishing boat, while all patrol boats should be sunk.

The NSC meeting continued to consider the appropriate course to resolve the crisis. It was informed that the Chinese Foreign Ministry in Beijing had refused to pass on the American note intended for the Khmer Rouge, but George Bush reported that they had read the note and that it might have been relayed to the Khmer Rouge. With a diplomatic solution appearing unlikely, General David Jones, acting Chairman of the Joint Chiefs of Staff, presented the NSC with a range of military options. Rescue planning was complicated by the uncertainty surrounding the location of Mayaguez's crew. It was believed that some were still on the ship, some on Koh Tang and others were on the fishing boat bound for Kampong Som. The NSC decided to proceed with a simultaneous attack by Marines to retake Mayaguez and attack Koh Tang, together with attacking Cambodian shipping and bombing mainland targets. Kissinger emphasized they needed to "impress the Koreans and the Chinese" with the punitive strikes.

The NSC debated whether to assault Koh Tang on the 15th or 16th. The Pentagon's option paper that Jones had distributed explained why a 48-hour delay was advantageous. The primary risk of military operations on the 15th was the "serious disadvantage of slow insertion (270 men per wave at 4+ hour intervals)." Alternatively, with the arrival of the USS Hancock in the area, a "coordinated assault at first light on 16 May would "carry lower military risks" and "enhance the prospects of quick success and minimize the loss of life." However, the paper noted that the disadvantage of going on the 16th was less chance of surprise and more time for the Cambodians to "put forward preconditions for the return of the ship and/or crew."

When Ford asked for the Pentagon's recommendation, Schlesinger deferred to Jones who said "We recommend that we land [on the morning of the 15th] on the island and on the ship." He told the NSC members the island could be taken with "high assurance of success." He thought, "The 175 Marines can secure themselves, with gunships and tactical air... When the second group arrives, we can cut off the neck of the island and move out... With somewhat over 600 Marines by nightfall, we should have a good feel for what is there. We can perhaps withdraw the next day." Jones concluded his presentation by saying "that is the operation as we recommend it, as a joint recommendation from all the Joint Chiefs."

At 10:10, despite having been hit by tear gas, the fishing boat arrived at Kampong Som. The Khmer Rouge commander at Kampong Som, apparently fearing attack by the Americans, refused to accept responsibility for Mayaguez's crew and so the fishing boat moved further down the coast, dropping anchor off the island of Koh Rong Sanloem. The circling fighters lost track of the fishing boat once it entered the port at Kampong Som, and so this was the location transmitted up the chain of command. At 11:29, U.S. aircraft sank another patrol boat and damaged another four.

1/4 Marines had arrived at U-Tapao from the Philippines at 05:45 on 14 May and had been waiting on standby for a helicopter assault on Mayaguez, but as the news of the arrival of the fishing boat at Kampong Som came in the helicopter assault was cancelled. At 14:00, BLT 2/9 began arriving at U-Tapao.

=== The rescue plan ===
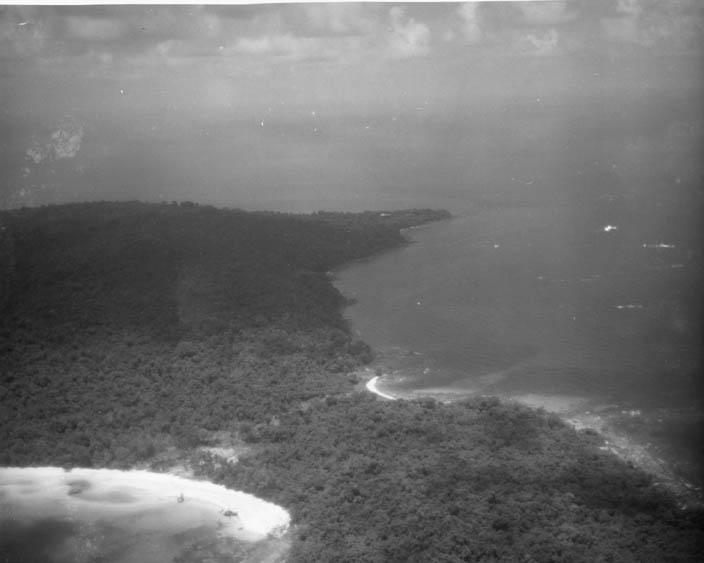
USAF reconnaissance photo of Koh Tang, showing East Beach and two downed CH-53s (left) and West Beach (right)

On the afternoon of 14 May, Burns received the order to proceed with a simultaneous assault on Koh Tang and Mayaguez timed to begin just before sunrise (05:42) on 15 May. D Company, 1/4 Marines would retake Mayaguez while BLT 2/9 Marines would rescue the crew on Koh Tang. With minimal intelligence available regarding the geography of Koh Tang, the commander of BLT 2/9 and his staff took off in a U-21 to make an aerial reconnaissance of the island.

Arriving over Koh Tang at 16:00, they were prevented from closely approaching the island in order not to compromise the secrecy of the mission or draw ground fire, but they determined that the island was so covered in jungle that the only two viable landing zones available were beaches on the west and east shores of the northern portion of Koh Tang. The Defense Intelligence Agency had made an assessment, in part from RF-4C and U-2 reconnaissance flights, that between 150 and 200 Khmer Rouge backed by heavy weapons occupied Koh Tang. This report was conveyed to U-Tapao but was never briefed to the planners (probably due to security classification issues) who believed that only about 20 Cambodian irregulars armed with small arms were on the island.

At 21:00, the rescue plan was finalized. Six hundred marines from BLT 2/9 — composed of E and G Companies — were assigned to conduct a combat assault in five CH-53 Knives and three HH-53 Jolly Greens to seize and hold Koh Tang. Two helicopters would make a diversionary assault on the West Beach (10.316°N 103.135°E), while six helicopters would make the main assault on the wider East Beach (10.316°N 103.139°E). The East Beach force would move to the nearby compound where Mayaguez's crew was believed to be held and then move across and link up with the West Beach force.

Two more waves of helicopters would be required to deploy all of BLT 2/9 to Koh Tang. The flight from U-Tapao to Koh Tang was a four-hour round trip. It was estimated that only 20–30 Khmer Rouge were on Koh Tang; the information regarding the heavy anti-aircraft fire coming from Koh Tang and the number of gunboats present was not passed on to the Marines. Preparatory airstrikes of the landing zones were ruled out for fear of hitting crew members who might be held nearby.

A unit of 57 marines from D Company, 1/4 Marines together with volunteers from Military Sealift Command to get Mayaguez underway, an explosive ordnance disposal team and a Cambodian linguist would be transferred by three HH-53 Jolly Greens to the Holt which was scheduled to arrive on station at dawn for a ship-to-ship boarding of Mayaguez one hour after the assault on Koh Tang began. Two additional CH-53s (because of their superior firepower, all the HH-53s were used for troop lift) were tasked as combat search and rescue helicopters, supported by an HC-130 "King" Airborne Mission Control aircraft of the 56th Aerospace Rescue and Recovery Squadron whose crew had extensive coordination meetings with both USAF and Marine HH-53 crews prior to launch.

USS Wilson was assigned to support the Koh Tang operation, and, after retaking Mayaguez, USS Holt would be deployed in a blocking position between Koh Tang and the Cambodian mainland with the mission of intercepting and engaging any Khmer reaction forces. U.S. Navy aircraft from Coral Sea were given the mission of striking targets on the Cambodian mainland to prevent interference with the rescue.

In the afternoon in New York City, the US ambassador to the UN, John A. Scali, delivered a request for assistance to UN Secretary-General Kurt Waldheim that noted the US reserved the right to act in self-defense in accordance with Article 51 of the UN Charter. Waldheim called the Chinese representative to the UN to his office and contacted the Cambodians via a channel used previously to secure the release of foreign citizens from Phnom Penh.

At 15:52 EDT (02:52 15 May Cambodia), Ford convened the fourth and final NSC meeting regarding Mayaguez. Jones briefed the NSC on the assault plan and plans for strikes by Guam-based B-52s on the port facilities at Kampong Som and the Ream Naval Base. Concerned that the use of B-52s might be excessive, Ford limited the bombing to attacks by carrier-based aircraft commencing at 07:45 (Cambodia) and gave the go-ahead to the rescue plan. Given the reports that the crew had probably been moved to the mainland, the NSC discussed whether any Americans were actually on Koh Tang. Kissinger pointed out there was no way to know and that "taking the island if they are not there is easier to explain than failing to take it if they are." Schlesinger agreed that "we have an obligation to get the Americans or to see if they are there."

At 19:00 EDT (06:00 15 May Cambodia) the UN issued a statement that the secretary-general was communicating with the Cambodians and that he encouraged all parties to refrain from further use of force.

== The Khmer Rouge on Koh Tang ==
Unknown to the Americans then converging on Koh Tang, none of Mayaguez's crew were on the island, which was defended by over 100 Khmer Rouge. These defences were intended to counter the Vietnamese, not the Americans. The Khmer Rouge commander of Kampong Som District, Em Son, was also given responsibility for securing Koh Tang and on 1 May he took a force of 100 men to Koh Tang to defend the island against possible Vietnamese attack. Sa Mean was given responsibility for the defense of Poulo Wai.

On the East Beach, two heavy machine guns had been dug in at each end of the beach and fortified firing positions had been built every 20 metres behind a sand berm connected by a shallow zig-zag trench. Two M60 machine guns, B-40 RPGs and two DK-82 recoilless rifles were in the firing positions. On the West Beach, a heavy machine gun, an M60, B-40 RPGs and a 75 mm recoilless rifle were dug into connected firing positions. North of each beach was a 60 mm mortar and south of the beaches was an 81 mm mortar that could fire on either beach. Ammunition was stored in dug-in bunkers, one behind each beach, with a third ammunition dump located near Em Son's command post in the jungle south of the beaches.

== Mayaguez's crew on Koh Rong Sanloem ==
Upon their arrival at Koh Rong Sanloem, Miller was taken to the senior Khmer Rouge commander where he was subject to a cursory interrogation before being asked if he could talk to the American planes from Mayaguez. The Khmer Rouge explained that they had already lost three boats and numerous men and were anxious to call off the American bombers. Miller explained that if they returned to the ship and restarted her engines they could then generate electricity to call their office in Bangkok which could then contact the U.S. military. The Khmer Rouge radioed instructions to their higher command and then gave approval for Miller and nine men to return to Mayaguez. As darkness was falling it was decided that they would return to Mayaguez the following morning, 15 May.

== Rescue operation ==
=== Retaking Mayaguez ===
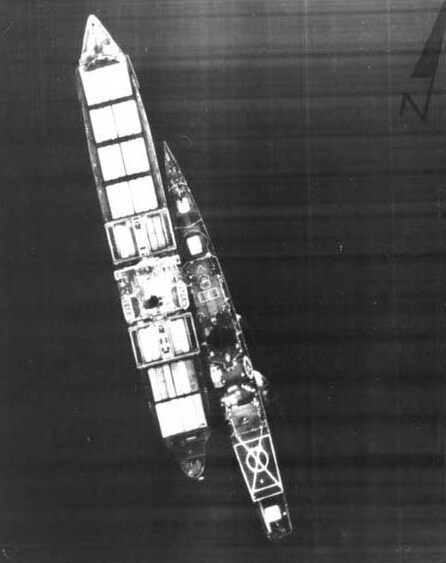
USS Harold E. Holt pulls alongside SS Mayaguez to allow the boarding party to board.

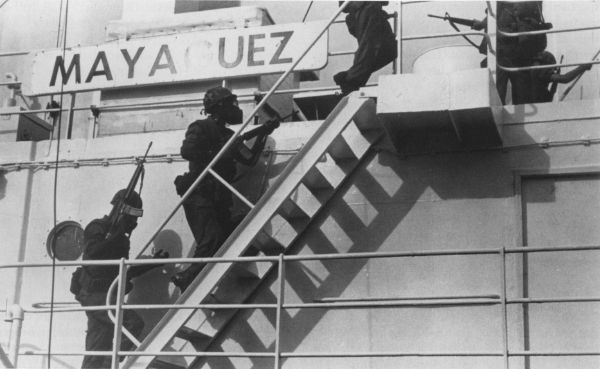
1/4 Marines board the Mayaguez.

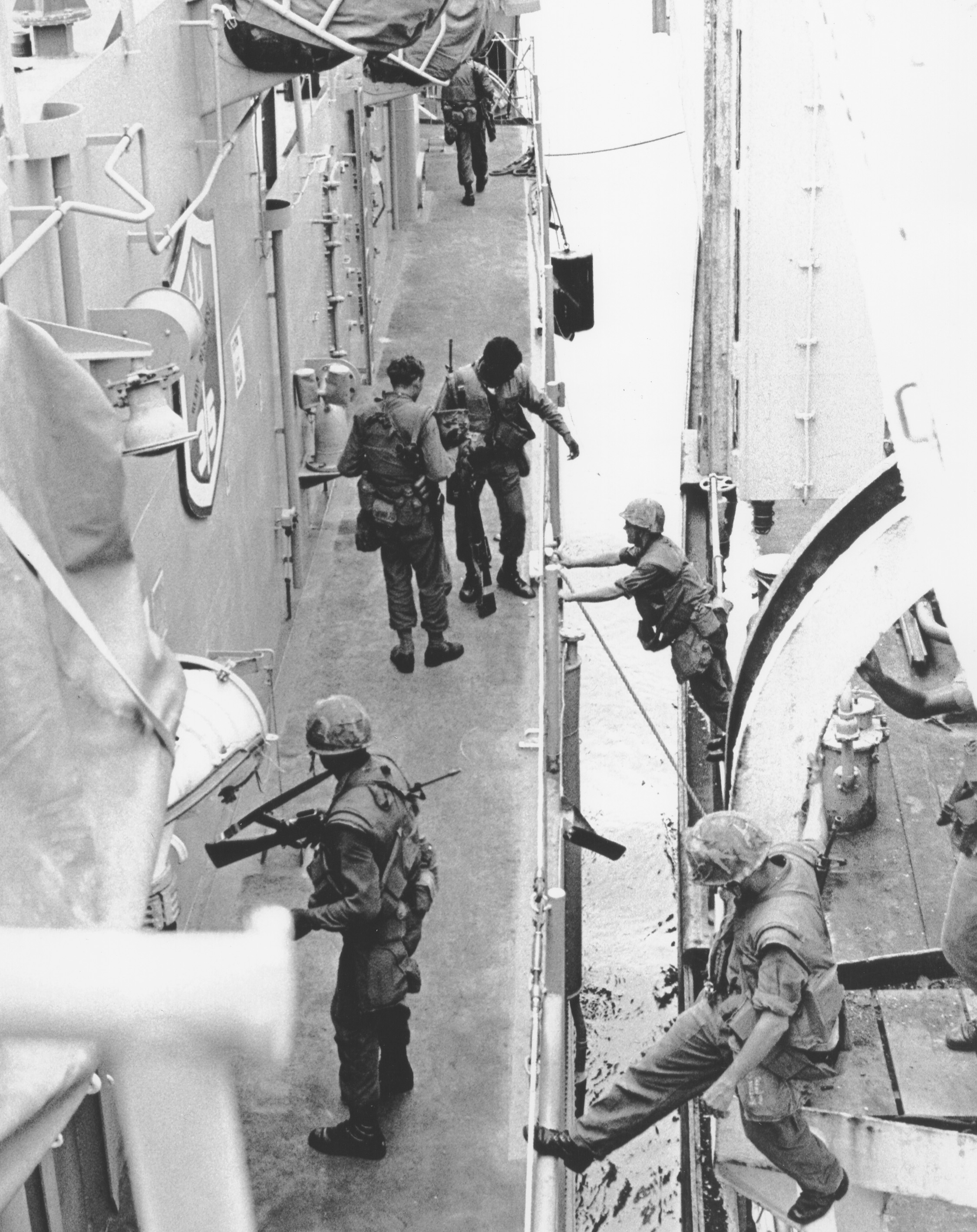
1/4 Marines reboard USS Harold E. Holt from SS Mayaguez.

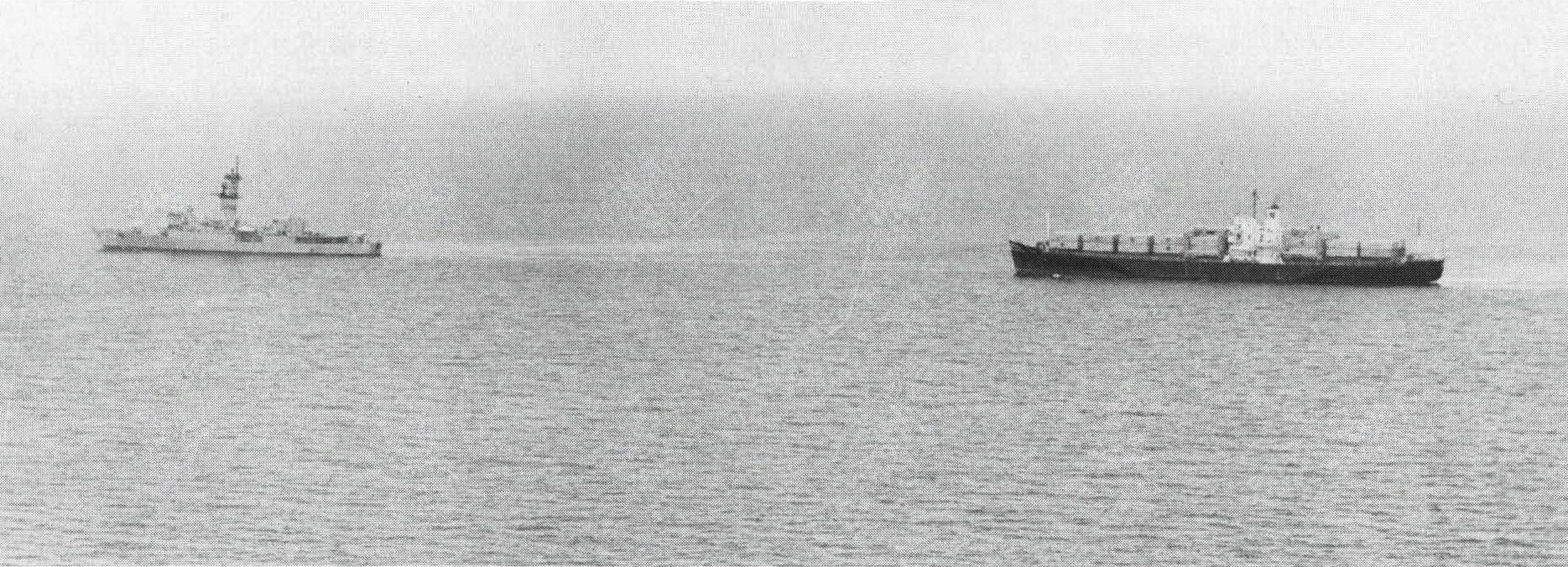
USS Harold E. Holt tows SS Mayaguez away from Koh Tang.

At 06:13 on 15 May, the first phase of the operation began with the transfer by three HH-53s of D/1/4 Marines to the Holt. As the Holt slowly came alongside, USAF A-7D aircraft saturated Mayaguez with tear gas munitions. Equipped with gas masks, the Marines at 07:25 hours then conducted one of the few hostile ship-to-ship boardings by the U.S. Navy since the American Civil War, securing the vessel after an hour-long search, finding her empty.

=== The assault on Koh Tang ===
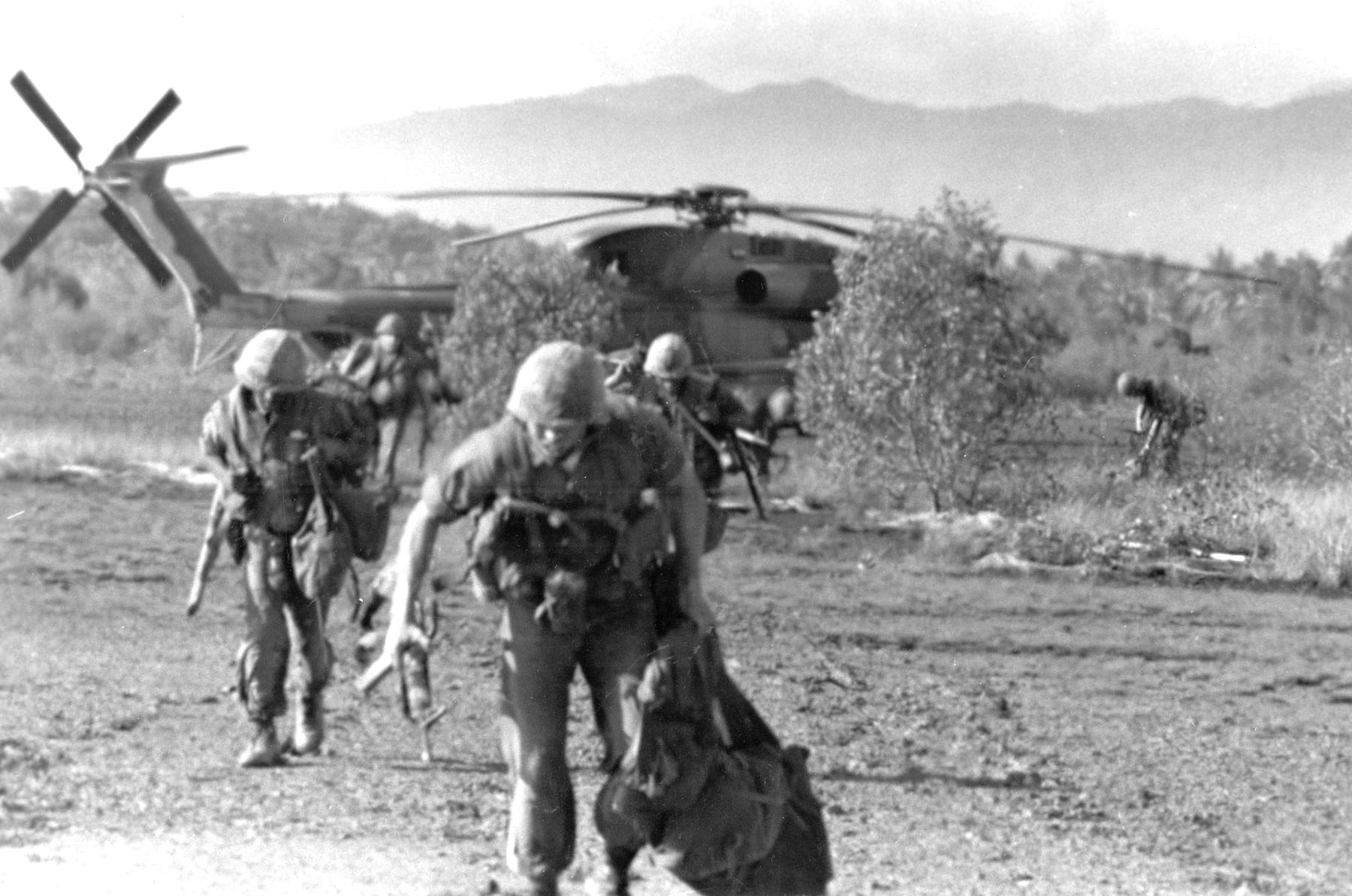
U.S. marines abandon their damaged helicopter Knife 22 in Thailand.

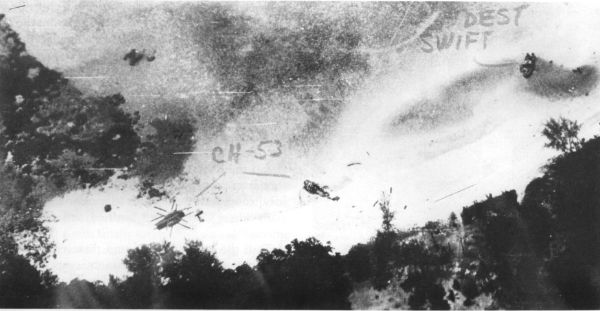
East Beach with Knife 23 at left, Knife 31 at center and a destroyed Khmer Rouge Swift Boat at right

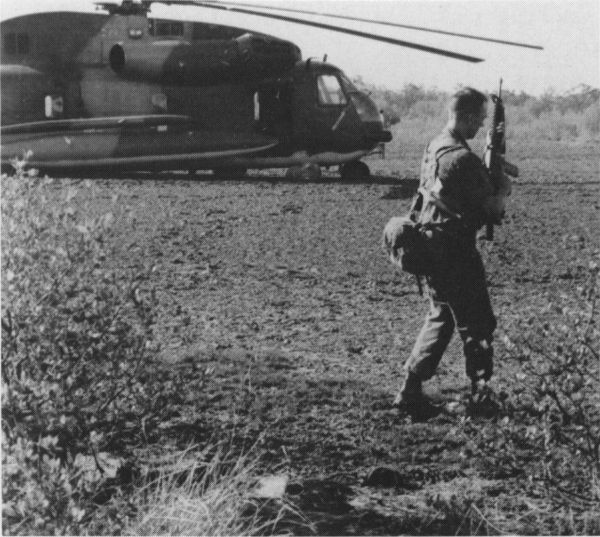
Knife 22 after emergency landing in Trat Province, Thailand

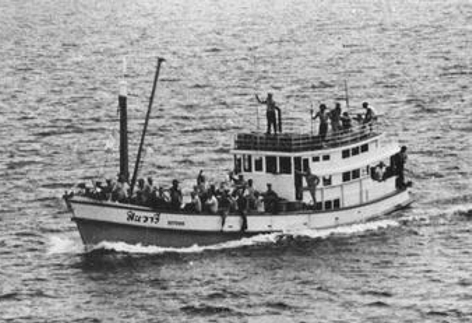
The Mayaguez crew released on the Sinvari

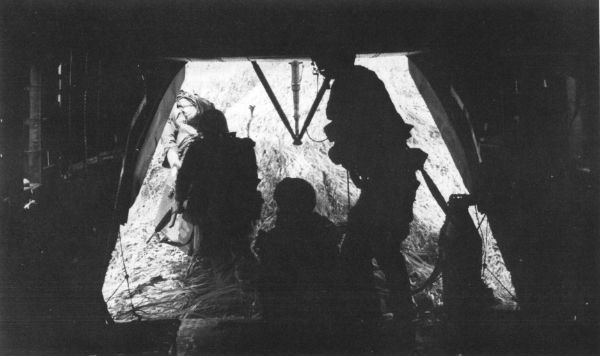
BLT 2/9 Command group disembarks Jolly Green 43 on the West Beach.

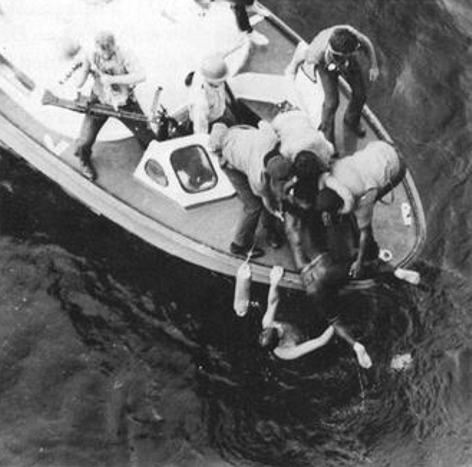
Gig of USS Henry B. Wilson rescues USAF personnel.

At 06:12, the eight helicopters (five CH-53 Knives and three HH-53 Jolly Greens) of the Koh Tang assault force approached the two Landing zones (LZs) on Koh Tang. At the West Beach, the first section of two CH-53 helicopters came in at 06:20. The first helicopter; Knife 21, landed safely, but while offloading its marines came under heavy automatic weapons fire, destroying an engine. It managed to take off, protected by suppressive fire from the second CH-53, Knife 22, and ditched 1.6 km offshore. Knife 22 was damaged so severely that it turned back with its marines (including the G Company commander) still aboard escorted by Jolly Green 11 and Jolly Green 12, and crash-landed in Trat Province on the Thai coast, where its passengers were picked up by Jolly Green 12 and returned to U-Tapao.

At 06:30, the CH-53s approaching the East Beach encountered intense automatic weapons and RPG fire from the entrenched Khmer Rouge. Knife 31 was hit by two RPGs, which ignited its left fuel tank and ripped away the nose of the helicopter. It crashed in a fireball fifty meters offshore. The copilot, five marines, and two Navy corpsmen were killed in the crash, another marine drowned swimming from the wreck and three marines were killed by gunfire trying to reach the beach. A tenth marine died of his wounds while clinging to the burning wreckage. The surviving ten marines and three Air Force crewmen were forced to swim for two hours before being picked up by the gig of the arriving Henry B. Wilson.

Among the Marine survivors was the battalion's Forward Air Controller, who used an Air Force survival radio while swimming to direct A-7 air strikes against the island until the battery failed. The second CH-53, Knife 23, was hit by an RPG which blew off the tail section and crash-landed on the East Beach but it offloaded its 20 marines and crew of five. They set up a defensive perimeter and the Knife 23 co-pilot used his survival radio to call in airstrikes but they were cut off from reinforcements and rescue for twelve hours.

Knife 32 was inbound to the East Beach when it was hit by an RPG and aborted its landing, instead heading out over the West Beach to the Knife 21 crash site where it dumped fuel and proceeded to rescue the three Knife 21 crewmen. Two other sections of the first wave, consisting of the remaining four helicopters, were diverted from the East Beach to the West Beach and eventually landed all of their marines between 06:30 and 07:00, although the final insertion by Jolly Green 41 required support from an AC-130 gunship to penetrate the Khmer Rouge fire on its fifth attempt. Knife 32, Jolly Green 41 and Jolly Green 42 eventually landed 81 marines on the West Beach under the command of the company Executive Officer, and Jolly Green 43 landed 29 marines of the battalion command post and mortar platoon a kilometre to the southwest.

By 07:00 109 marines and five Air Force crewmen were on Koh Tang but in three isolated beach areas and in close contact with Khmer Rouge troops. The Marines at the northern end of West Beach attempted to move down the beach to link up with Austin's command element to the south, but were beaten back by heavy Khmer Rouge fire which killed Lance corporal Ashton Loney.

While isolated, the Marines were able to use their 81 mm mortars for fire support and devised a makeshift communications network for controlling supporting air strikes by USAF A-7 and F-4 aircraft. It was decided that the platoon isolated on the East Beach should be extracted; following suppressive fire from an AC-130, Jolly Green 13 landed there at 08:15 amid a hail of machine-gun fire. It had landed some 100 m away from the Marines, who were reluctant to risk running to the helicopter; the helicopter took off again with its fuel lines ruptured and made an emergency landing in Rayong, Thailand.

Of the eight helicopters assaulting Koh Tang, three had been destroyed (Knife 21, Knife 23 and Knife 31) and four others were damaged too severely to continue operations (Knife 22, Knife 32, Jolly Green 41 and Jolly Green 42). Of the helicopters used in the recapture of Mayaguez, Jolly Green 13 had been severely damaged in the East Beach rescue attempt. This left only three helicopters (all HH-53s – Jolly Greens 11, 12 and 43) of the original eleven available to bring in the follow-up forces of BLT 2/9, so the 2 CH-53s (Knife 51 and 52) whose mission had been search and rescue – the last available helicopters – were reassigned to carry troops.

The five helicopters picked up 127 marines of the second wave at U-Tapao between 09:00 and 10:00. At 11:50 Knife 52, Knife 51 and Jolly Green 43 arrived over Koh Tang and prepared to land on the East Beach. As Knife 52 approached, fire punctured its fuel tanks and the pilot aborted the landing and headed back to U-Tapao leaking fuel. Knife 51 and Jolly Green 43 also abandoned their landings and assumed a holding pattern.

=== Release of Mayaguez's crew ===
At 06:07 the Khmer Rouge information and propaganda minister, Hu Nim, made a radio broadcast announcing that Mayaguez would be released. The section of his communique on the release was:

Regarding the Mayaguez ship. We have no intention of detaining it permanently and we have no desire to stage provocations. We only wanted to know the reason for its coming and to warn it against violating our waters again. This is why our coast guard seized this ship. Their goal was to examine it, question it and make a report to higher authorities who would then report to the Royal Government so that the Royal Government could itself decide to order it to withdraw from Cambodia's territorial waters and warn it against conducting further espionage and protractive activities. This applies to this Mayaguez ship and to any other vessels like the ship flying Panama flags that we released on May 7, 1975.

The transmission was intercepted by the CIA station in Bangkok, translated and delivered to the White House by 07:15 (20:15 EDT). The White House was sceptical of the Khmer Rouge message and the lack of clarity regarding the crew and released a press statement at 08:15 (21:15 EDT) saying that U.S. military operations would continue until the crew of Mayaguez was released. At 07:44 the JCS ordered a delay to the first armed reconnaissance strike by planes from Coral Sea on the Kompong Som oil storage complex and Ream airfield. Confusion over orders meant that the planes dropped their ordnance at sea and returned to the Coral Sea, when at 07:48 the JCS reinstated the order for airstrikes.

At 06:30 on Koh Rong Sanloem, the crew of Mayaguez were informed that they would be allowed to return to their ship, after having first agreed to a statement that they had not been mistreated. At 07:15 Mayaguez's crew was loaded aboard the Thai fishing boat, Sinvari (which had been captured by the Khmer Rouge five months earlier) escorted by a second boat with Sa Mean and other Khmer Rouge. Once away from Koh Rong Sanloem the second boat picked up the Khmer Rouge guards from Sinvari and instructed the crew to return to Mayaguez and call off the American planes.

At 09:35 a circling P-3 Orion spotted Sinvari and Wilson was ordered to intercept it, originally thinking it was a Khmer Rouge gunboat. The P-3 then identified that Caucasians were aboard and at 09:49 Mayaguez's crew was brought aboard Wilson. Confirmation of the release of the crew was sent to the White House and at 11:27 (00:27 EDT) Ford went on U.S. national television announcing the recovery of Mayaguez and the rescue of its crew, but obscuring the fact that the crew had in fact been released by the Khmer Rouge.

Ford, at Kissinger's urging, declined to cancel the scheduled airstrikes on the Cambodian mainland until the Marines on Koh Tang had been withdrawn. At 08:45 A-6A Intruder and A-7E aircraft from VA-22, VA-94 and VA-95 escorted by F-4N fighters of VF-51 and VF-111 aboard Coral Sea began the second wave of airstrikes, bombing landing barges and oil storage facilities at Kompong Som and cargo planes and T-28 Trojan aircraft at Ream airfield. Despite receiving confirmation of the release of the crew, at 10:20 the third wave of airstrikes hit boats at Ream naval base. At 11:45 the fourth planned airstrike on the mainland was cancelled and the jets directed to support the Marines on Koh Tang.

=== Extraction of U.S. Marine elements ===
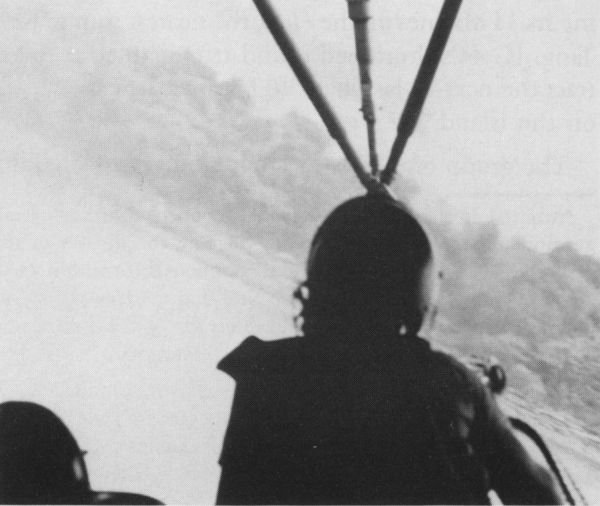
View of the West Beach from an HH-53

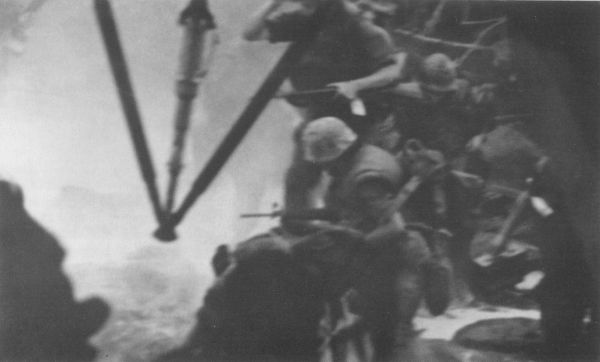
Marines of 3rd Platoon, Company G board Jolly Green 11 to evacuate the East Beach.

The U.S. Joint Chiefs of Staff decided that, with the ship recaptured and the crew released, further reinforcement of Koh Tang was unnecessary and at 11:55 they ordered the U.S. forces to "immediately cease all offensive operations against the Khmer Republic [and to] disengage and withdraw all forces from operating areas as soon as possible". Hearing this order, the circling EC-130 ABCCC recalled the second assault wave. The helicopters with the second wave reversed course until Austin, on the ground on Koh Tang, convinced Burns that the reinforcements were necessary to prevent his units from being overrun; the order was rescinded at 12:10.

The second wave carrying the marines from Knife 22 and a platoon from Company E had originally taken off at staggered times between 09:00 and 10:00, but with the reversal of course its arrival on Koh Tang was seriously delayed. At 12:10 Knife 51, followed by Jolly Greens 43, 11 and 12 landed 100 additional marines and evacuated nine wounded on the West Beach, making a total of 225 marines – 205 on the West Beach and 20 marines and five airmen on the East Beach. Around the same time Austin's isolated command unit planned a linkup of its small contingent with the bulk of Golf Company at the northern end of the West Beach. Using mortar fire and A-7 airstrikes to clear Khmer Rouge in the jungle between the two forces, it reached the G Company perimeter at 12:45.

By 14:00 firing on the West Beach had reduced substantially as Em Son had moved most of his men back from the beaches with only three-man patrols maintaining pressure on the two Marine enclaves. Austin asked the ABCCC if he should attempt to push across the island (a distance of approximately 1,100 feet (340 m)) to link up with the isolated unit on the East Beach, but was advised that another helicopter pickup would be attempted first. At 14:15 Jolly Greens 11 and 43 approached East Beach, but were repulsed by heavy fire. Jolly Green 43 had a fuel line damaged, but made an emergency landing aboard Coral Sea at 14:36, where it was repaired and returned to service by 17:00.

During the attempted landing by Jolly Green 43, fire was seen coming from a semi-submerged Swift Boat that had been shot up by an AC-130 the previous day, A-7 aircraft were called in to destroy the boat with their 20 mm cannon. At 16:20 hours, Nail 68, an Air Force OV-10 forward air control (FAC) aircraft, arrived and took over the direction of air support. At 16:23 Nail 68 called on Wilson to use its 5-inch gun to destroy the semi-submerged Swift Boat.

This change in controllers marked a turning point in the quality of airborne firepower available to the Marines because for the first time that day they had an airborne observer exclusively dedicated to providing accurate and timely close air support. At 17:00 Em Son gathered his forces and moved back up the island to secure an ammunition dump that lay between the West and East Beaches. He was surprised to find the dump intact and no marines lying in ambush. Now supplied, his men would be able to increase the pressure on the Marines again.

At 18:00 as the sun began to set a third attempt to rescue the East Beach force was attempted, using Jolly Green 11 as the rescue ship and with gunfire support from Jolly Green 12, Knife 51 and the gig from Wilson mounting four M60s. Nail 68 first ordered gun runs by an AC-130 followed by F-4s and A-7s along the edge of the East Beach. As this was going on, five C-130s arrived over Koh Tang carrying BLU-82 "daisy cutter" bombs — a 15,000-pound (6,800 kg) device and the largest conventional explosive weapon in the U.S. arsenal at the time. Not seeing any practical use for the BLU-82s, Nail 68 ordered them dropped well south of the Marines' positions.

At 18:15 Jolly Green 11 approached the East Beach, but did not actually set down because the hulk of Knife 23 was sitting on the beach. Instead, the pilot (First Lieutenant Donald Backlund) skilfully hovered the helicopter several feet off the ground just north of the original beach LZ. The extraction was difficult because the helicopter would see-saw up and down. Only a few marines at a time could board the helicopter's rear ramp in this fashion by timing their jumps to coincide with the downward motion of the aircraft. Jolly Green 11 was hit numerous times, but managed to transport its cargo of 20 marines and five airmen to the Coral Sea.

Shortly after Jolly Green 11 evacuated the East Beach, the first BLU-82 was dropped causing a huge explosion and sending a shock wave across the West Beach. Austin quickly called the ABCCC with the instruction that no more of the bombs should be dropped. A report from Jolly Green 11 indicated that a marine might be in the wreckage of Knife 31 and Jolly Green 12 went in to search for any survivors. Jolly Green 12 hovered above the wreck, while a crewman was lowered on a rescue hoist to survey the wreckage. No marine was recovered and Jolly Green 12 suffered extensive damage in the rescue attempt and flew to Coral Sea.

As a moonless night fell over Koh Tang, the remaining two helicopters, Knife 51 and the hastily repaired Jolly Green 43, were joined by Jolly Green 44 which had been out of service at its Nakhon Phanom base but had been repaired and flown to the area. At 18:40 this force began to withdraw the remaining 205 marines from the West Beach, protected by AC-130 fire and naval gunfire support from Henry B. Wilson and its gig. The first load of 41 marines was lifted out at 18:40 by Knife 51 and flown to the Coral Sea, followed by 54 taken aboard Jolly Green 43.

As Jolly Green 44 picked up a load of 44 marines, the remaining marines in the shrinking West Beach perimeter came under intense attack and were in danger of being overrun. The round trip to Coral Sea took thirty minutes, so the pilot, First Lieutenant Bob Blough, decided to deliver his marines to Harold E. Holt, the nearest ship to Koh Tang, in complete darkness while hovering the helicopter over the ship with only its front wheels touching down. Within five minutes Jolly Green 44 returned and picked up 34 more marines, leaving 32 still on the island. Jolly Green 44 was suffering engine trouble and this time headed for Coral Sea.

At 20:00 Knife 51 landed and began loading marines in the dark, and under fire. Captain Davis and Gunnery Sergeant McNemar were joined by Knife 51's Pararescueman Technical Sergeant Wayne Fisk outside of Knife 51. With the marines aboard, Fisk followed Davis and McNemar in boarding Knife 51. Fisk requested permission to deplane, and as he moved to do so, two marines stumbled aboard, out of the darkness. Fisk located Davis and asked whether all his men were aboard, confirming they were. Fisk, for a final time requested and received permission to deplane Knife 51, with McNemar waiting by Knife 51 as Fisk hastily searched the beach. With illumination rounds from Cambodian mortars, Fisk returned to Knife 51 where McNemar jumped aboard, and Knife 51, some 10 minutes after landing, departed Koh Tang for the Coral Sea

== U.S. Marines left behind and subsequent controversy ==
Due to the intense direct and indirect fire during the operation, the bodies of marines and airmen who were killed in action were left where they fell including LCpl Ashton Loney, whose body was left behind in the darkness during the evacuation of the West Beach.

With each withdrawal, the Marines contracted their perimeter on the West Beach. Lance Corporal John S. Standfast, squad leader, 3rd Squad, 3rd Platoon, Company E and his squad covered Company G's withdrawal during the reduction of the perimeter, and he then singlehandedly directed the pullback of his own squad. Before withdrawing to the safety of the new perimeter, Standfast and his platoon guide Sergeant Andersen moved forward to the old perimeter to ensure that no member of the company inadvertently had been left behind, each time checking every foxhole. As the Company E commander Captain Mykle E. Stahl prepared to board Jolly Green 44 he informed Captain Davis that all of his men were inside the perimeter, not realising that three marines of an M60 machine gun team had set up a firing position behind a rocky outcrop beyond the right flank of the perimeter.

Even as Knife 51 left the West Beach, there was confusion as to whether any marines remained on Koh Tang. The pilot, First Lieutenant Brims, radioed the FAC that some marines aboard claimed there were still fellow marines on the ground, but this was soon contradicted by Davis who said that all marines were off Koh Tang. Two hours after the evacuation was completed, with the Koh Tang Marines dispersed among three Navy ships, Company E commander Captain Stahl discovered that three of his marines were missing.

The Marines checked all of the Navy ships but could not locate Lance Corporal Joseph N. Hargrove, Private First Class Gary L. Hall, and Private Danny G. Marshall, members of a three-man machine gun team which had been assigned to protect the right flank of the constantly shrinking perimeter during the final evacuation. Sergeant Andersen was the last member of the Marine force to see Hall, Hargrove and Marshall alive at about 20:00 when he ordered them to move back to a new position which was located to the left of the position occupied by Captain Davis.

Just after 20:20 USAF Staff Sergeant Robert Velie on the ABCCC aircraft received a radio transmission from an American asking when the next helicopter was coming to extract them. After Velie received the authentication code from the caller to confirm this was not a Khmer Rouge ploy, Velie's commander radioed the Holt to advise that marines were still on the island. Holt radioed back that the marines should swim out to sea for rescue, but when Velie passed this message back to the caller he was told this wasn't possible because only one of the three could swim. Velie advised the caller to take cover as air strikes were about to hit the area. The caller confirmed this and no further radio contact was received.

A rescue operation was proposed using Marine volunteers aboard the only three serviceable helicopters. On Coral Sea the Commander of Task Force 73, Rear Admiral Robert P. Coogan met with Austin, Davis, McNemar and Coulter, who had just arrived from Subic Bay with a 14-man U.S. Navy SEAL, team to consider possible options. Coogan asked Coulter to take Wilson's gig ashore in daylight unarmed under a white flag with leaflets dropped and Wilson broadcasting the crew's intentions to recover the American bodies and determine the status of the missing men if possible, but Coulter was sceptical and instead proposed taking his team ashore for a night reconnaissance, but this was refused by Coogan.

Coogan had to weigh up the order from Seventh Fleet to cease hostile actions against the Khmer Rouge against the lack of evidence that any of the men were still alive, he decided that there would be no rescue mission unless there was some confirmation that the three marines were still alive. The following morning Wilson cruised back and forth between the West and East Beaches for three hours broadcasting messages in English, French and Khmer saying that they had no hostile intent, but simply wished to retrieve any U.S. personnel dead or alive on the Koh Tang and would send an unarmed boat ashore if the Khmer Rouge signalled them.

Half of Wilson's crew was on deck scanning the beaches and jungle for any sign of the missing marines, but no signal was received from the Khmer Rouge or the missing marines. With no indication that the three marines were still alive and the certainty that more lives would be lost in any forced rescue attempt, a return to Koh Tang was ruled out and Wilson departed the area. Hargrove, Hall and Marshall were declared Missing in Action and then on 21 July 1976 their status was changed to Killed in Action (Body Not Recovered).

In 1985, an eyewitness report indicated that a wounded American had been captured on Koh Tang after the assault and was subsequently executed. The NSA intercepted Cambodian messages which referred to 'the American that was captured' with orders not to talk about this.

In 1999 Em Son approached the Joint Task Force-Full Accounting (JTF-FA) on learning that they were looking for further information regarding the events on Koh Tang. Em Son advised that on the morning on 16 May he ordered his men to search the West Beach for any remaining Americans. About 100 m from the beach one of the Khmer Rouge was hit by M16 fire. The Khmer Rouge then fired mortars and encircled the firing position, capturing one American with a leg wound. Em Son's description of the American matched that of Hargrove. The Khmer Rouge continued their search and located an abandoned M60 machine gun, various equipment and the covered body of a black American soldier. Em Son ordered the dead American (presumably Ashton Loney) buried and the prisoner taken to his headquarters. When Em Son was advised that the Khmer Rouge hit by M16 fire had died, he ordered the American to be shot.

Approximately one week after the assault, Em Son's men noticed that their leftover food was being disturbed and on searching they found bootprints in the mud. They set up a night ambush and on the third night they captured two Americans matching the descriptions of Hall and Marshall. Em Son radioed Kampong Som and was ordered to deliver the Americans to the mainland. The following morning the two Americans were taken by boat to the mainland and then driven to the Ti Nean Pagoda above Sihanoukville where they were stripped to their underwear and shackled. After one week, on orders from Phnom Penh, each American was beaten to death with a B-40 rocket launcher. Hall's body was buried in a shallow grave near the beach. Marshall's was dumped on the beach cove.

Recovery efforts in 1999 by the JTF-FA later found bone fragments that might have belonged to Hall and Marshall, but DNA tests proved inconclusive due to the small size of the fragments. Hargrove, Hall and Marshall all received Purple Hearts from the U.S. Marine Corps. Hargrove's family did not receive the award until 1999, after investigative journalist and author Ralph Wetterhahn published several articles in popular magazines about his findings.

In 2007, Hargrove's cousin, Cary Turner, began a campaign to have Joint POW/MIA Accounting Command (JPAC), the successor agency to JTF-FA, return to Koh Tang to search for Hargrove's remains. In October 2008 JPAC was reported to have found four sets of remains in an area indicated by Em Son as being where the American suspected to be Hargrove was buried. One of the sets of remains was said to be Caucasian in nature, but DNA analysis was needed before the identity could be confirmed.

In 2016 the Defense POW/MIA Accounting Agency (DPAA), the successor to JPAC, announced that it had recovered Hall's ID card and other items from an empty grave on the island and later acknowledged having recovered a US radio and flak jacket from near where Knife 51 had taken off.

== Aftermath ==
=== Casualties ===
U.S. estimates of Khmer Rouge casualties were 13–25 killed on Koh Tang with an unknown number killed on Swift Boats and on the Cambodian mainland.

U.S. casualties were ten marines, two Navy corpsmen, and an Air Force crewman killed in the crash of Knife 31; an Air Force crewman killed in the crash of Knife 21; one marine killed in action on the West Beach; and three marines missing in action and presumed dead. Fifty were wounded including thirty-five marines and six airmen. In addition, eighteen USAF Security Police and five flight crew were killed in the CH-53 crash on the way to U-Tapao.

Between 1991 and 1999, U.S. and Cambodian investigators conducted seven joint investigations, led by the JTF-FA. On three occasions Cambodian authorities unilaterally turned over remains believed to be those of American servicemen. In October and November 1995, U.S. and Cambodian specialists conducted an underwater recovery of the Knife 31 crash site where they located numerous remains, personal effects and aircraft debris associated with the loss. USS Brunswick, a U.S. Navy salvage vessel, enabled the specialists to conduct their excavation offshore. In addition to the support provided by the Cambodian government, the Government of Vietnam also interviewed two Vietnamese informants in Ho Chi Minh City who turned over remains that were later positively identified. As a result of these investigations the remains of Second Lieutenant Richard Vandegeer, Lance Corporals Gregory S Copenhaver and Andres Garcia and Privates First Class Lynn Blessing, Walter Boyd, Antonio R Sandoval and Kelton R. Turner were identified. In 2012 the remains of PFC James Jacques, PFC Richard W Rivenburgh and PFC James Maxwell were identified. A US Department of Defense Factsheet of US MIAs in Cambodia dated April 27, 2021 reports: “Witnesses have assisted in identifying recovery sites on Koh Tang, the island associated with the Mayaguez incident. Thirteen of the 18 Americans missing from that incident have been recovered and identified".

=== Awards ===
Four airmen were awarded the Air Force Cross for their actions during the battle:

- Captain Rowland Purser, pilot of Jolly Green 43
- First Lieutenant Donald Backlund, pilot of Jolly Green 11
- First Lieutenant Richard C. Brims, pilot of Knife 51
- Staff Sergeant Jon Harston, flight mechanic of Knife 31

Second Lieutenant James V. McDaniel, platoon commander of Company G, 2/9 Marines was awarded the Navy Cross.

Two airmen and four marines were awarded the Silver Star:

- Technical Sergeant Wayne Fisk, a pararescueman on Knife 51.
- First Lieutenant Bob Blough, pilot of Jolly Green 44.
- Lieutenant Colonel Randall W. Austin, the commanding officer of 2/9 Marines.
- First Lieutenant Michael S. Eustis, USMC, the artillery liaison officer of 2/9 Marines.
- First Lieutenant James D. Keith, USMC, the executive officer of Company G, 2/9 Marines.
- First Lieutenant Terry L. Tonkin, USMC, the forward air controller of 2/9 Marines.

Although the Mayaguez incident did not occur in Vietnam, it is commonly referred to as the last battle of the Vietnam War. However, U.S. military personnel who participated in it are not eligible for the Vietnam Service Medal by virtue of participating in that battle alone. The Armed Forces Expeditionary Medal is authorized instead for military members who participated in the battle. A congressional bill was introduced in 2016 to award veterans of the Mayaguez battle the medal, but the bill was referred to committee, effectively ending it.

=== Impact on Kampuchea ===
The U.S. air attacks destroyed a large part of the Khmer Navy and Air Force weakening them for the war with Vietnam over the disputed islands. In mid-June Vietnam attacked Poulo Wai and fought the Khmer Rouge before withdrawing in August and recognising it as Kampuchean territory. Relations between the two countries improved thereafter until early 1977 when the Kampuchean Revolutionary Army began attacking Vietnamese border provinces, killing hundreds of Vietnamese civilians, which eventually resulted in the Cambodian–Vietnamese War starting in December 1978.

For the Khmer Rouge leadership, the fact that the U.S. attacked them even after they had announced the release of the Mayaguez and its crew, combined with memories of the U.S. bombing of Cambodia prior to August 1973, reinforced their beliefs that the U.S. "imperialists" were determined to undermine their revolution. The increasingly paranoid Khmer Rouge presumed that any foreigners captured in the country and purged Khmer Rouge (including Hu Nim), were CIA spies and would torture them at Tuol Sleng until they obtained confessions confirming their beliefs, after which they would be executed.

=== Impact on Thailand ===
In discussing the possible Thai response to the operation, Kissinger told the NSC that the Thai government would be upset, "but they will also be reassured" and "the Thai military will love it." As news of the operation reached Bangkok protests began outside the U.S. Embassy. U-Tapao air base had been used by U.S. rescue forces despite an explicit refusal of permission by the relatively new civilian Thai government of Kukrit Pramoj. After being refused by the Thai government, the US sought and obtained permission from the Thai military to proceed, resulting in considerable anger towards the United States. The Thai government called the act a violation of Thailand's sovereignty and called for the immediate withdrawal of all U.S. forces from U-Tapao. As a result, the USAF implemented Palace Lightning, closing all USAF bases. The last USAF personnel left Thailand in June 1976.

=== Impact on the United States ===
The reaction of the U.S. public was favorable with President Ford's overall approval rating rising 11 percentage points. However Ford's public approval ratings fell off quickly and precipitously as details of the incident and casualty figures became better known.

Some congressmen were dissatisfied with the level of consultation they received under the War Powers Resolution. Senator Mike Mansfield was the most critical, saying "we were informed, not consulted". In 1977 Senator Thomas Eagleton introduced an amendment to the War Powers Resolution that added the rescue of nationals to the list of situations not requiring prior approval by Congress, but also stipulating that only minimum force would be used in rescue. Eagleton's proposed amendment did not pass and similar amendments have been proposed since but also not progressed.

On 23 June 1975, the House of Representatives Subcommittee on International Political and Military Affairs asked the General Accounting Office to review all aspects of the incident. On the War Powers Resolution, the General Accounting Office report's assessment was "The available evidence suggests less than full compliance with Section 3 [of the War Powers Resolution]."

The paramount objective during the crisis, as Scowcroft later explained, "was to make it clear, to everyone, to our friends, to potential opponents, that notwithstanding the fact that we had just withdrawn from Southeast Asia under fairly ignominious circumstances, if you will, that the United States understood its interests and was prepared to protect them." Schlesinger later said the same thing, acknowledging the primary reason for the use of force was “to make quite clear to all parties that the United States was still an effective force." Although the general goal was to reinforce the US reputation for defending its interests, the main concern in that regard was the Korean Peninsula. As Scowcroft related in 1980, "To the extent that we were looking anywhere specifically, it was primarily probably not Southeast Asia at that time, but at Korea," where the renewal of the long-simmering conflict between the two Koreas was considered a real possibility.

In November 1975 Schlesinger was dismissed as Secretary of Defense due to his perceived insubordination during the crisis.

=== Impact on U.S. military rescue planning ===
The Mayaguez Rescue was the most classic example of assured failure with Joint Operations to that time. Unfortunately, the lesson was not learned and the same mistakes were repeated in the Iranian Hostage Rescue operation (1980). ... In the final analysis... the lack of accurate intelligence resulted in faulty decisions. Decisions were driven by the desire to do something and to do it as quickly as possible.

— — Brigadier-General Richard E. Carey

The U.S. military received much criticism for its handling of the incident. In addition to the failure of intelligence to determine the whereabouts of the crew of Mayaguez and the presence of a sizable hostile force on Koh Tang, the timing of the operation was questioned until it became clear that combat had been underway four hours before the crew was released. Within the services, the Marines in particular were critical of the ad hoc nature of the joint operation and the perceived pressure from the Administration for hasty action, although the success of Operation Frequent Wind had been the basis for many decisions made during the crisis.

Vice Admiral George P. Steele, the Seventh Fleet commander, later stated that: "The sad part of the Mayaguez is that we had sufficient force coming up with the Seventh Fleet, after it had been turned around from the evacuation of Vietnam stand down, to seize Southern Cambodia. I begged for another day or two, rather than commit forces piecemeal as we did .... The idea that we could use U.S. Air Force air police and Air Force helicopters as an assault force appears to me as ridiculous today as it did then."

When many of the coordination and communications problems arose again during Operation Eagle Claw, the hostage rescue mission in Iran in 1980, significant changes in joint and special operations were brought about.

=== Legal action by crew ===
In April 1977 some Mayaguez crew members brought lawsuits in admiralty law at the San Francisco Superior Court against Sea-Land Service Inc relating to the incident. The crew members claimed that Captain Miller was derelict in his duty by "recklessly venturing into known dangerous and hostile waters of foreign sovereignty (Cambodia)" inviting the capture. Evidence was provided that Mayaguez was not flying a flag, and had sailed about two nautical miles off Poulo Wai. In June 1977, a settlement was reached. In February 1979 another settlement was reached by other crew members, making a total settlement of $388,000 to the crew members taking legal action.

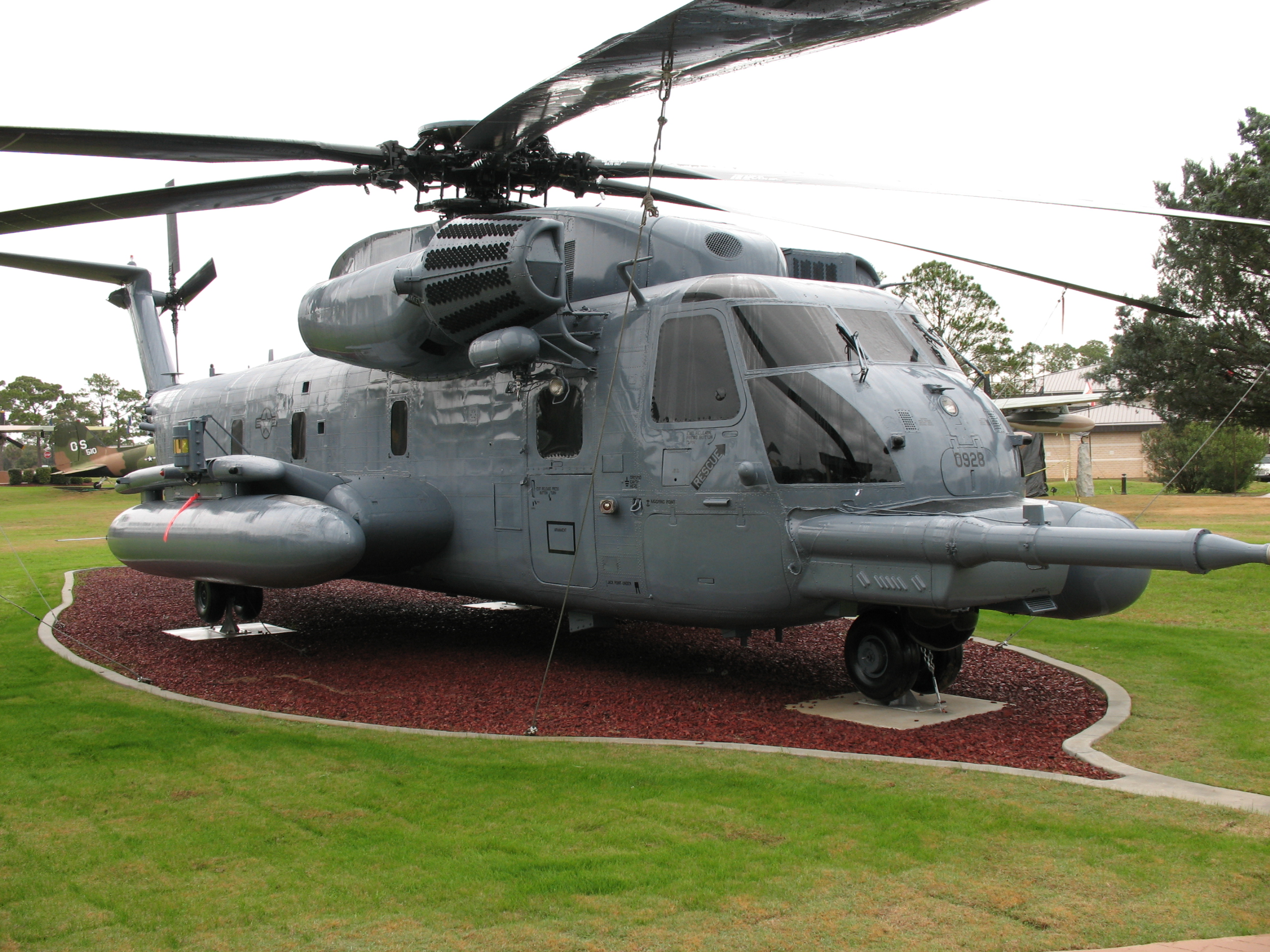
Former Knife 22, number 68-10928, upgraded to MH-53M Pave Low on display at Memorial Air Park, Hurlburt Field, Florida

=== Memorials ===
In 1996 the Mayaguez-Marine Corps Memorial was dedicated in the grounds of the U.S. embassy in Phnom Penh by then Ambassador Kenneth M. Quinn and Senator John McCain. The memorial lists the names of the 18 U.S. servicemembers killed and missing at Koh Tang, along with Marine Security Guard Sergeant Charles "Wayne" Turberville, who was killed in a Khmer Rouge grenade attack on 26 September 1971. The former Knife 22, number 68-10928, upgraded to MH-53M Pave Low is on display at Memorial Air Park, Hurlburt Field, Florida.

== See also ==
- Khmer National Navy
- List of hostage crises
