= 21st Special Operations Squadron =

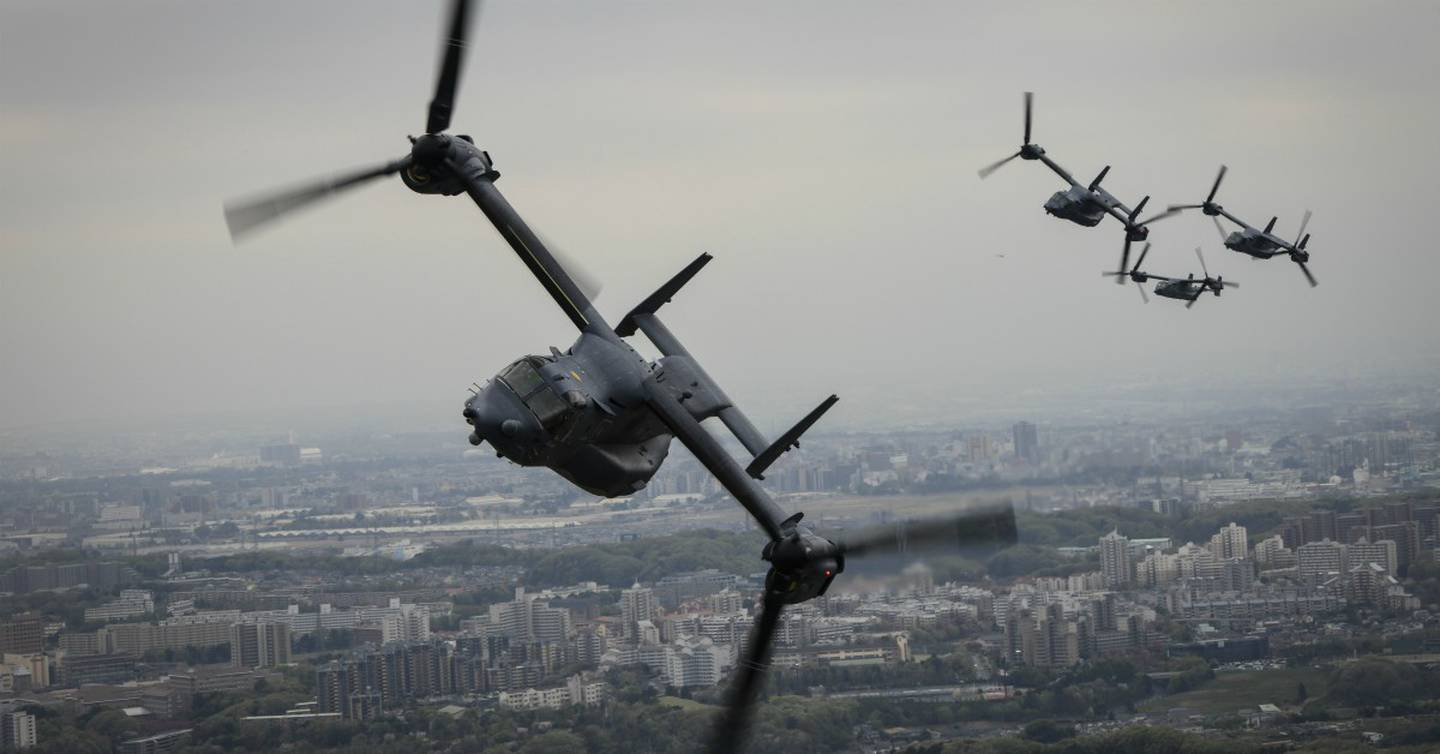
- Active: 1940–1946; 1956–1957; 1967–1975; 1988–2007; 2019–
- Country: United States
- Branch: United States Air Force
- Role: Special operations
- Garrison/HQ: Yokota Air Base, Japan
- Nickname: Dust Devils
- Engagements: World War II; Asiatic-Pacific Campaign (1941-1945): Vietnam War (1967–1973); Operation Frequent Wind Mayaguez incident: Gulf War; NATO Operations; Operation Deny Flight Operation Deliberate Force
- Decorations: Distinguished Unit Citation; Presidential Unit Citation; Air Force Outstanding Unit Award w/Combat "V" Device; Air Force Outstanding Unit Award; Philippine Republic Presidential Unit Citation; Vietnamese Gallantry Cross with Palm

Insignia
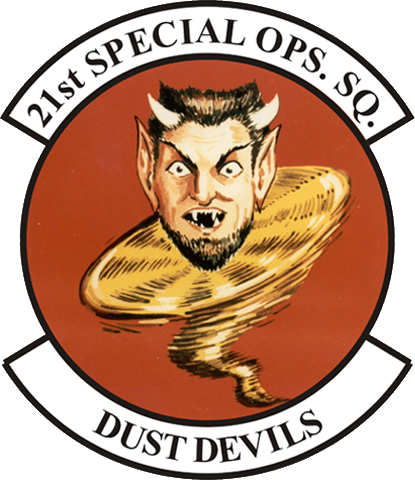
- 21st Special Operations Squadron emblem (approved 18 October 1967, reinstated 1996)

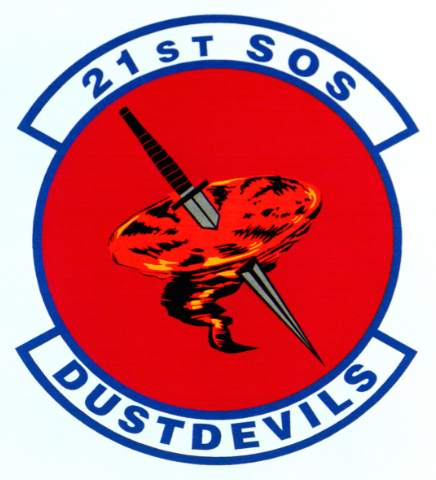
- 21st Special Operations Squadron emblem (approved 6 June 1995)

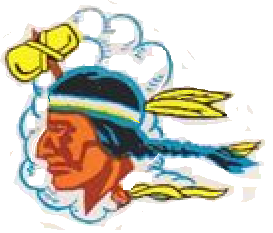
- 21st Pursuit Squadron emblem (approved 20 December 1941)

The 21st Special Operations Squadron is a unit within the 353rd Special Operations Wing, United States Air Force based at Yokota Air Base, Japan. The unit has been activated and inactivated a number of times in its history. Prior to October 2007 it was with the 352nd Special Operations Group, United States Air Force, United States European Command, and based at Royal Air Force base RAF Mildenhall in Suffolk, England.

It can trace its roots back to the 21st Pursuit Squadron, which was activated on 1 February 1940 at Moffett Field, California. It took part in the combat in the Philippine Islands, from 8 December 1941. Being inactivated on 2 April 1946, later being activated as the 21st Helicopter Squadron, and inactivated again. Then activated for the Vietnam War on 30 June 1967, assigned to Tactical Air Command, later being redesignated the 21st Special Operations Squadron on 1 August 1968. The squadron took part in both Operation Frequent Wind, and the Mayaguez incident. In addition to its combat duties, the unit has taken part in a number of humanitarian aid operations.

== Mission ==
The 21st Special Operations Squadron, which fell under the 352nd Special Operations Group, RAF Mildenhall, UK, was inactivated on 31 October 2007 with the inactivation ceremony taking place at RAF Mildenhall, UK on 9 October temporarily ending the Air Force Special Operations vertical lift mission in Europe.

The inactivation of the Dust Devils was the first step in preparation for the arrival of the CV-22 tilt-rotor aircraft.

The 21st Special Operations Squadron's mission consisted of day or night, all-weather, low-level penetration of denied territory to provide infiltration, exfiltration, resupply, or fire support for elite air, ground, and naval forces. The unique capabilities of the MH-53J permitted the squadron to operate from unprepared landing zones.

== History ==
The 21st Special Operations Squadron traces its lineage to the 21st Pursuit Squadron (Interceptor) which was constituted on 22 December 1939. Activated on 1 February 1940 at Moffett Field, California, it was assigned to the 35th Pursuit Group until 15 January 1942 (but attached to the 24th Pursuit Group, c.20 November 1941 – 2 April 1946). The squadron saw combat in the Philippine Islands, from 8 December 1941–c. 1 May 1942 and a ground echelon fought as infantry in Bataan, from 18 January–c. 8 April 1942. It was not operational from the fall of the Philippines until its inactivation on 2 April 1946. Aircraft flown by the squadron during that period were probably the P-36, (1940–1941) and the P-40 (1941–1942).

It was consolidated on 19 September 1985 with the 21st Helicopter Squadron, which was activated on 9 July 1956 at Donaldson Air Force Base, South Carolina, flying the Piasecki H-21 and assigned to the Eighteenth Air Force (but attached to the 63rd Troop Carrier Wing, 9 July 1956 – 30 June 1957; 314th Troop Carrier Wing, 30 June 1957). It was reassigned to Ninth Air Force, on 1 September until 15 October 1957 (remained attached to 314th Troop Carrier Wing through c.8 October 1957). It inactivated on 5 October 1957.

It reactivated on 30 June 1967, assigned to Tactical Air Command, and was organized on 15 July 1967 at Shaw Air Force Base, South Carolina under the 507th Tactical Control Group. Operating the CH-3 (until 1971), it was reassigned to the 56th Air Commando Wing (later, 56th Special Operations Wing), on 27 November 1967. It was redesignated as the 21st Special Operations Squadron on 1 August 1968.

In 1970, the squadron began operating the Sikorsky CH-53 Sea Stallion. In September 1970, the 21st Special Operations Squadron flew eleven CH-3E helicopters and one new CH-53 helicopter, which arrived at Nakhon Phanom Royal Thai Air Force Base on 8 August. The squadron referred to the large CH-53 as "BUFF", for "big, ugly, fat fellow", and this designation should not be confused with a similar nickname given to B-52 bombers.

=== Vietnam War ===
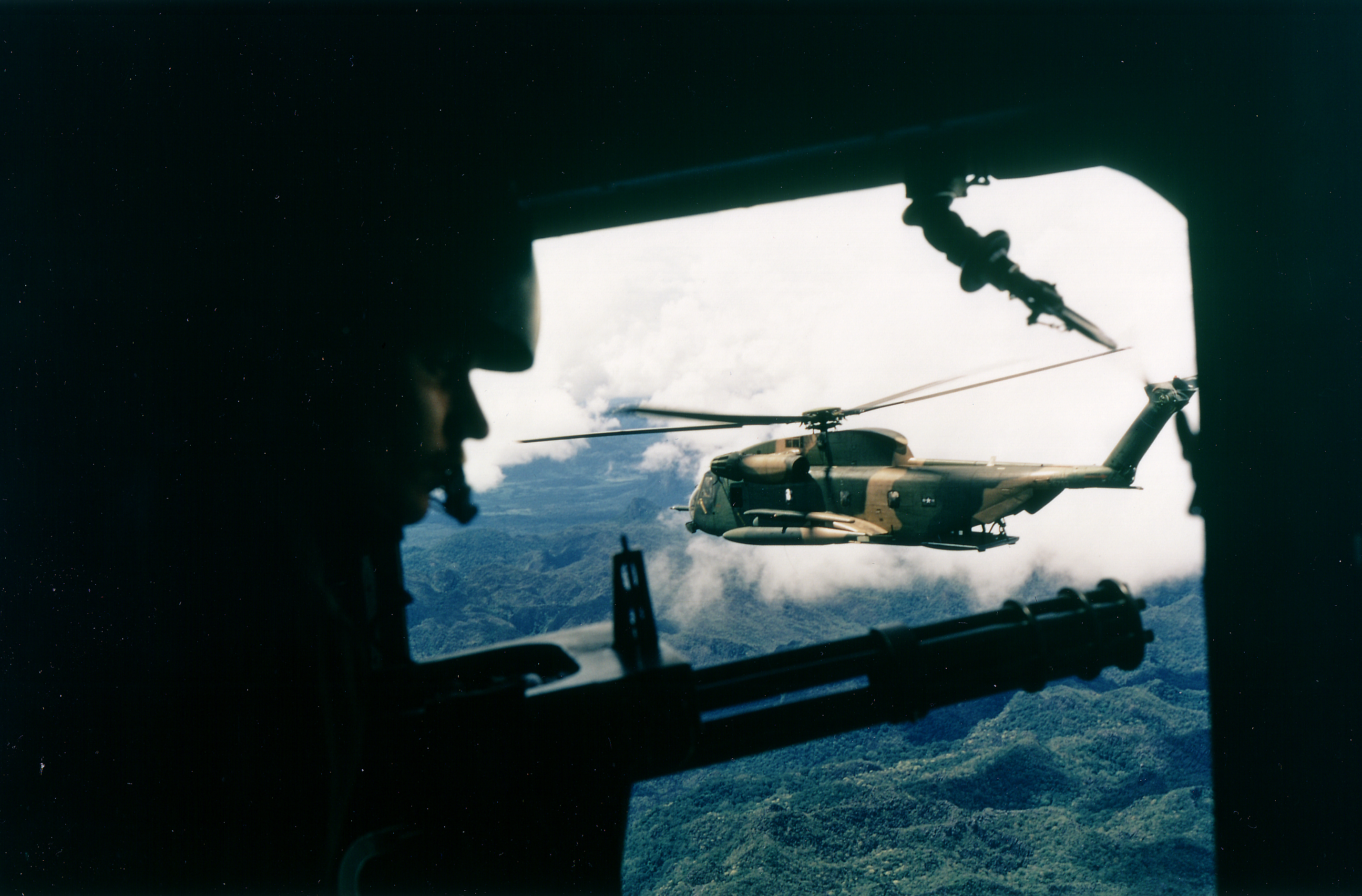
A HH-53 helicopter of the 40th Aerospace Rescue and Recovery Squadron as seen from the gunner's position in a helicopter of the 21st Special Operations Squadron in Vietnam, October 1972

The squadron saw combat in Southeast Asia, from November 1967 – August 1973, aircraft losses were as follows:

- 23 May 1968, Dusty 51, CH-3 BuNo 66-13295 was lost to unknown causes while flying a sensor delivery mission north of Khe Sanh, Quang Tri Province, South Vietnam, the crash site could not be reached due to heavy enemy activity. All five crewmen and a combat photographer were KIA, their remains were recovered on 2 November 1968 by Marines from Kilo Company, 3rd Battalion 4th Marines. This was the first combat loss for the 21st SOS
- 13 August 1970, Skycap 36 CH-3E BuNo 63-09681 was flying between Nakhon Phanom and Ubon Royal Thai Air Force Base when it was hit by a 12.7mm round which blew up the hydraulic accumulators and knocked out both engines causing the aircraft to crash. Four of the crewmen were killed.
- 24 October 1970, Knife 33 CH-3E BuNo 66-13287 was in a flight of two extracting indigenous personnel from a hill top LZ in Laos. Knife 33 picked up 11 personnel and as it lifted off, it turned and fell into trees 200 meters from the LZ. A short time later, the other helicopter picked up 8 indigenous personnel and the surviving crewmembers. The pilot and flight engineer were both killed.
- 1 March 1971, Knife 34 CH-53 BuNo 68-10931 crashed on landing at Lima Site 20 in Laos, hit ground, spun right, rolled down hill, flipped and burst into flames. The pilot and copilot were both killed.
- 24 January 1975, CH-53 BuNo 70-1628 crashed near Ban Nakhon, Thailand. The four-man crew were all killed.

On 29 and 30 April 1975, eight of the Squadron's CH-53s participated in Operation Frequent Wind, operating from USS Midway.

- 13 May 1975, Knife 13 CH-53 BuNo 68-10933 departed from Nakhon Phanom Royal Thai Air Force Base with a crew of five and eighteen USAF Security Police on board to assist in the recovery operation of the SS Mayaguez. The helicopter disappeared from the airfield's departure radar 40 miles (64 km) west of the airfield. All on board were killed.
- 15 May 1975, 7 of the squadron's CH-53s supported the rescue of the SS Mayaguez, with 3 destroyed in the assault on Koh Tang Island. Knife 23 BuNo 68-10927 crash-landed on Koh Tang, all 5 crew were later rescued. Knife 31 BuNo 68-10925 was hit by 2 RPGs, exploded and crashed in the sea 50m offshore, 10 marines, 2 navy corpsmen and the copilot Second Lieutenant Richard Vandegeer were killed in the crash, but their remains were not recovered until 1995. Knife 21 was hit and ditched a mile offshore, the flight engineer Staff Sergeant Elwood E. Rumbaugh was killed, remains not recovered

The 21st was reassigned to Thirteenth Air Force, on 30 June 1975 (though attached to the 656th Special Operations Wing) before inactivating on 22 September 1975 at U-Tapao Royal Thai Navy Airfield, Thailand.

=== Reactivation in Europe ===
The squadron was reactivated on 1 May 1988 at RAF Woodbridge, England. The 67th ARRS which flew both the HC-130 "Hercules" and HH-53 "Super Jolly Green Giant" was split into two units, becoming the 67th Special Operations Squadron for the 130 fixed-wing aircraft and the 21st Special Operations Squadron for the rotary wing. Flying the MH-53J Pave Low III, it was assigned to the 39th Special Operations Wing (though attached to the Joint Special Operations Task force at Batman Air Base, Turkey, from 13 January–18 March 1991 and from 6 April–10 June 1991 at Diyarbakır Air Base, Turkey). The 21st provided support to coalition forces during Southwest Asia conflict, from January to March 1991 and later.

The 21st relocated to RAF Alconbury, England, and was reassigned to the 352nd Special Operations Group, on 1 December 1992 (though attached to Joint Special Operations Task Force from 2 March–12 July 1993, deploying during that period to Brindisi Air Base, Italy and Incirlik Air Base, Turkey).

Joint Task Force Provide Comfort deployed to Incirlik Air Base at Adana, Turkey, on 6 April 1991. The initial Provide Comfort deployment was a scaled-down package made up of the lead elements of the USAF 39th Special Operations Wing. This unit was first labeled "Express Care." Its ground organization included command, administration, ordnance, maintenance, supply, and support personnel. The ground component of Joint Task Force Express Care was the 1st Battalion, 10th Special Forces Group. The Army's Special Forces were experienced, highly skilled, unconventional warriors specially trained to work and live with indigenous populations in remote areas. About 200 Special Forces soldiers were assigned to support Provide Comfort. General Jay Garner tasked Colonel James L. Jones to move the 24th Marine Expeditionary Unit into northern Iraq on 20 April to secure the town of Zakho. In preparation, a flight of two MH-53J Pave Low helicopters from 21 SOS made a reconnaissance of the area. They brought back photographs and video imagery of the operations area and potential camp sites.

A squadron MH-53 Pave Low was escorted by two Hungarian Mil MI-24 Hind gunships over Lake Balaton on their way to Szentkirályszabadja airfield Veszprém, Hungary, for participation in the Hungarian/US Bilateral Rescue Exercise Combined Rescue 95. The Stokes Litter on the Pave Low is designed for rapid extraction of injured without landing.

In 1998, an Air Force MH-53 Pave Low from the 21st Special Operations Squadron, RAF Mildenhall, England, flew out of San Vito, Italy in support of the Bosnian peacekeeping mission.

An MH-53J Pave Low helicopter from the 352nd Special Operations Group's 21st Special Operations Squadron, landed aboard the USS Monongahela (AO-178) operating in the Mediterranean Sea on 4 February 1999. The helicopter, call sign SKAT 08, got an emergency call to evacuate a seaman with appendicitis for transport to the hospital in Lecce, Italy. The patient was transferred and the helicopter returned to Brindisi Air Station, Italy, without incident.

The 21st Special Operations Squadron participated in a combat search and rescue mission for the pilot of a downed F-117A stealth fighter during the air campaign against Serbia and the forces of Yugoslavian president Slobodan Milošević. A radio transmission from a refueling tanker stating it had received no response from his F-117A customer. Then followed reports the stealth fighter was missing or shot down. Soon after, the MC-130P Combat Shadow crew took off en route to Bosnia-Herzegovina for a rendezvous with three rescue helicopters. Two were MH-53 Pave Lows, one from the 21st SOS and the other from the 20th SOS at Hurlburt Field, Florida. The third helicopter was an MH-60 Pave Hawk from the now inactivated 55th SOS at Hurlburt Field. The plan called for the rescue helicopters to refuel immediately before crossing the Serbian border to allow them to operate with full fuel tanks. After more than 90 minutes of orbiting close to the border, the call came from the helicopter crews for the desperately needed fuel that would enable them to continue the rescue mission. The refueling took place at the unusually low altitude of 700 feet within three miles of the Serbian border. President Clinton called the 352nd SOG commander to give personal thanks.

In 1993, the 352nd Special Operations Group, RAF Mildenhall, England, and the 16th Special Operations Wing, Hurlburt Field, Florida, initially deployed people and hardware to San Vito while supporting Operation Provide Promise, a humanitarian airlift that sustained thousands of sick and starving civilians trapped by Bosnia's civil war. Eventually, as Balkan peacekeeping efforts began in earnest, unit tasking switched to Operation Deny Flight, with 352nd SOG and 16th SOW resources staying put. And they maintained a sizable presence there as long as US General Dynamics F-16 Fighting Falcons, French Dassault Mirage 2000s or British Panavia Tornadoes continue flying air-policing missions. Supporting the fighter community is a big part of the mission. The Squadron has an all-weather, around-the-clock capability to go in and get them if anything goes wrong.

Things did "go wrong" for one French aircrew on 30 August 1995, during the first day of Operation Deliberate Force, NATO's bombing campaign that eventually forced Bosnian factions into a truce. Within an hour after the campaign began, Serbian ground forces shot down a Mirage, capturing its injured pilot and weapon systems officer. Unaware the Frenchmen were prisoners, special operations members flew nightly reconnaissance missions into Bosnia from Italy, hoping to locate and then rescue the men. On one flight, two MH-53 Pave Low helicopters from the squadron – exposed by bright moonlight – came under heavy anti-aircraft and small-arms fire. Seventy-five miles deep into hostile territory, the choppers, call signs Knife 44 and 47, slugged their way out while receiving help from a Hurlburt AC-130 Spectre, two Fairchild Republic A-10 Thunderbolt IIs, two Marine McDonnell Douglas F/A-18 Hornets and a Navy Northrop Grumman EA-6B Prowler. Staff Sgts. Dennis Turner and Randy Rutledge, Knife 44 side-gunners from Hurlburt's 20th Special Operation Squadron, were wounded by shrapnel during the fight but managed to return a furious fusillade of their own. Both men received Purple Hearts.

Mildenhall's 21st and 7th squadrons, using MH-53s and MC-130H Combat Talon IIs, also ferried troops into Sarajevo and Tuzla, and played a key role in Bosnia's 1996 elections by flying 54 United States delegates – including special envoy Richard Holbrooke – to eight polling sites scattered throughout the war-scarred country. During the delegate shuttles, Hurlburt 16th SOS Spectres patrolled travel routes, and MC-130P Combat Shadows from Mildenhall's 67th SOS refueled helicopters and provided airborne command and control.

In mid-1996 Air Force Special Operations Command helicopters passed the 5,000 flying-hour milestone supporting NATO's Bosnian operations. MH-53J Pave Low III crews from both the 21st Special Operations Squadron, RAF Mildenhall, UK, and the 20th SOS, Hurlburt Field, Florida, provided combat search and rescue capability for more than three years and continue flying missions supporting Operation Joint Endeavor. The Pave Lows did numerous combat search and rescue missions, including two missions into Bosnia to search for two French crewmembers shot down during Operation Deliberate Force. The Paves also aided the Marine helicopters that rescued Capt. Scott O'Grady in 1995.

In early 1997 members of the 352d Special Operations Group, 100th Air Refueling Wing and Third Air Force departed for areas around Zaire as part of the enabling force to support Joint Task Force Guardian Retrieval. Approximately 200 people and aircraft from the 352d, 23 people from the 200th and seven from Third Air Force deployed to Libreville, Gabon, in West Africa, while four other wings and 3rd AF members were sent to Brazzaville, Congo. The wing also supported the operation with air refueling. The first group assets, MC-130P Combat Shadows from the 67th Special Operations Squadron, arrived in Africa followed by additional special operations assets including MH-53J Pave Low helicopters from the 21st. Mildenhall airmen joined about 400 soldiers, sailors and Marines comprising the joint task force ashore in West Africa. Approximately 550 American citizens were in Zaire and the majority of those were in the capital, Kinshasa.

A 1,300-member coalition force, spearheaded by Joint Special Operations Task Force 2, operates 10 miles outside of Brindisi at San Vito Air Station. Its role is to support NATO troops deployed to Bosnia-Herzegovina and aircrews monitoring a no-fly zone above that volatile country, where Serbian mobs attacked Army patrols in September 1997. All these special operations resources were based at San Vito, but for 34 years during the Cold War, San Vito hosted various intelligence units that intercepted and analyzed transmissions from former Warsaw Pact countries. And though the base supposedly closed in October 1994, as part of the United States military drawdown, the Bosnian mission keeps San Vito's gates open.

The leadership traits of Capt. Mark T. Daley, a squadron airman, earned him the Air Force's 1999 Lance P. Sijan Leadership Award for Junior Officers.

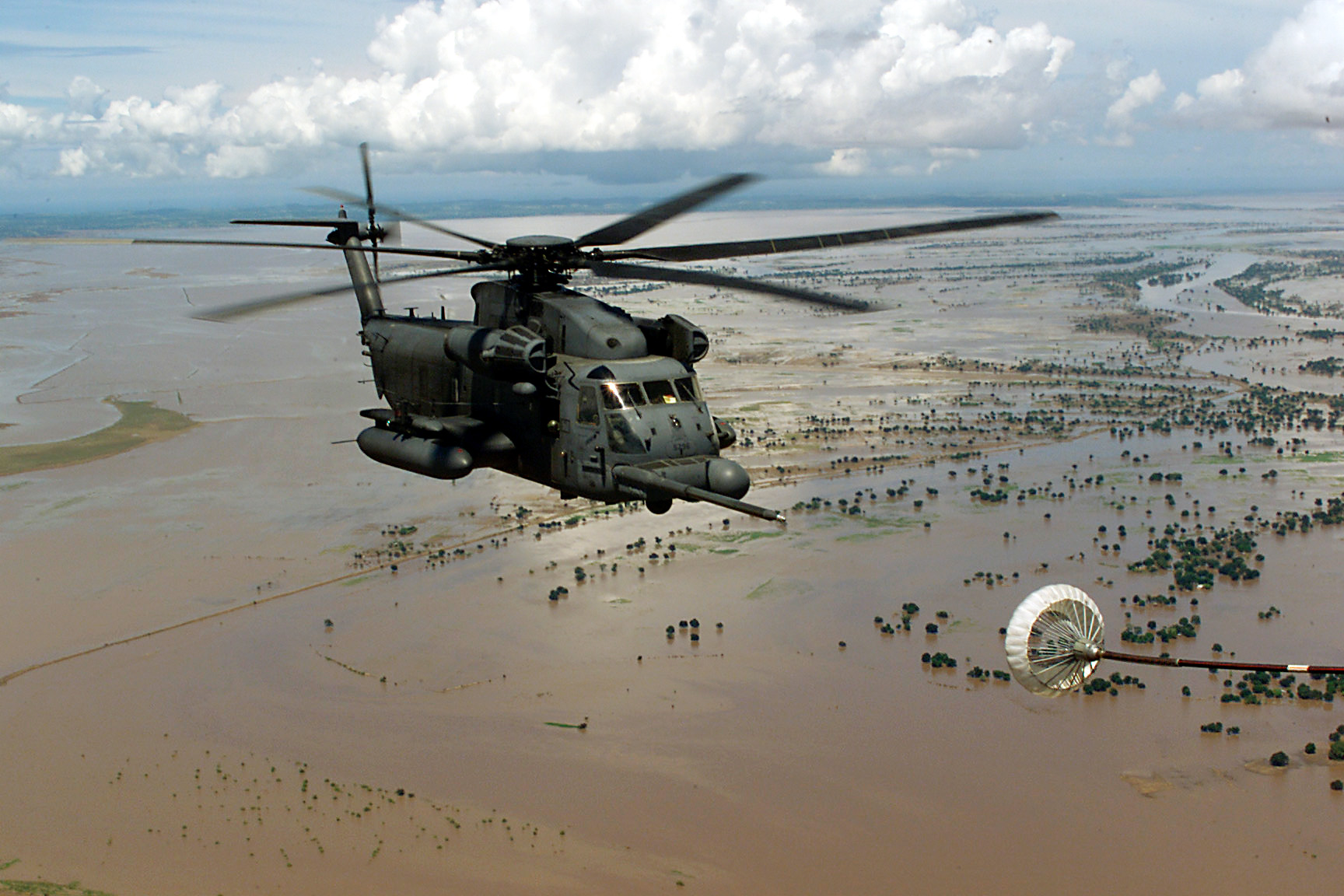
MH-53M Pave Low IV helicopter approaches the refueling basket of an MC-130P Combat Shadow for in-flight refueling as they fly over flooded Central Mozambique, 20 March 2000

In March 2000, the squadron deployed a MH-53M Pave Low IV helicopter to Air Force Base Hoedspruit, South Africa to support Operation Atlas Response. Operation Atlas Response was a multi-national humanitarian relief mission helping displaced people in central and southern Mozambique that had been devastated by floods. A United States Air Force flight crew used the maiden voyage of one of its MH-53M Pave Low IV helicopters 12 March to deliver desperately needed clothing to flood victims in Mozambique. The 21st transported more than 4,700 pounds of donated clothing from the Mozambique town of Palmeira to Xai-Xai, a city still half-submerged by floodwaters.

A call came on the early evening of 21 May 2002 to rescue two injured passengers aboard a storm-damaged yacht, the Persuader, in rough seas approximately 450 miles off the southwest coast of England. Answering that call was a combined Team Mildenhall effort resulting in hoisting the injured man and woman aboard an MH-53M Pave Low IV helicopter and transferring them to a civilian hospital. Those involved in the daring rescue placed it among their most harrowing experiences. Because the yacht was out of range of British air and sea rescue vessels, the 21st Special Operations Squadron was called upon. The duration of the mission stretched across two days and required about 90,000 pounds of fuel via aerial refueling. The two Combat Shadows received about 56,000 pounds during three aerial refuelings from KC-135s, and the two Pave Low helicopters received about 32,000 pounds during nine aerial refuelings from the two Combat Shadows. It was the longest non-stop rescue performed from the British Isles.

Special Operations Forces and rescue forces were in high demand during Operation Iraqi Freedom. The MH-53Ms from the 21st SOS conducted missions over Iraq.

With the retirement from USAF active duty of the Pave LOW MH-53J & M model helicopters, the 21st was inactivated on 9 October 2007.

The squadron was activated again on 1 July 2019 at Yokota Air Base, Japan and equipped with CV-22 Osprey tilt-rotor aircraft. It is assigned to the 353d Special Operations Wing, which is stationed at Kadena Air Base, Japan.

=== Lineage ===
- Constituted 21st Pursuit Squadron (Interceptor) on 22 December 1939

Activated on 1 February 1940
Inactivated on 2 April 1946

- Consolidated (19 September 1985) with the 21st Helicopter Squadron

Constituted on 24 February 1956
Activated on 9 July 1956
Inactivated on 15 October 1957

- Activated on 30 June 1967

Organized on 15 July 1967
Redesignated 21st Special Operations Squadron on 1 August 1968
Inactivated on 22 September 1975

- Activated on 1 May 1988.

Inactivated on 9 October 2007

- Activated on 1 July 2019

=== Assignments ===
- 35th Pursuit Group, 1 February 1940 – 15 January 1942

Attached to 24th Pursuit Group, c. 20 November 1941 – 2 April 1946

- Eighteenth Air Force, 9 July 1956 (attached to 63d Troop Carrier Wing until 30 June 1957, then to 314th Troop Carrier Wing)
- Ninth Air Force, 1 September 1957 – 15 October 1957 (attached to 314th Troop Carrier Wing through c. 8 October 1957)
- Tactical Air Command, 30 June 1967 (not organized)
- 507th Tactical Control Group, 15 July 1967
- 56th Air Commando Wing (later, 56th Special Operations Wing), 27 November 1967
- Thirteenth Air Force, 30 June 1975 – 22 September 1975 (attached to 656th Special Operations Wing)
- 39th Special Operations Wing, 1 May 1988 (attached to Joint Special Operations Task force, 13 January-18 March 1991 and 6 April-10 June 1991)
- 352d Special Operations Group, 1 December 1992 – 9 October 2007 (attached to Joint Special Operations Task Force 2 March 1993 – 12 July 1993)
- 353d Special Operations Group, 1 July 2019 – present

=== Stations ===
- Moffett Field, California, 1 February 1940
- Hamilton Field, California, 10 September 1941 – October 1941
- Nichols Field, Luzon, Philippines, c. 20 November 1941

Air echelon operated from Clark Field, Luzon, c. 9 December 1941 – c. 15 December 1941

- Lubao Airfield, Luzon, c. 25 December 1941
- Bataan, Luzon, c. 4 January 1942 – 6 April 1942
- A portion of the air echelon operated from Del Monte Field, Mindanao, c. 9 April 1942 – c. 1 May 1942
- Donaldson Air Force Base, South Carolina, 9 July 1956 – 15 October 1957
- Shaw Air Force Base, South Carolina, 15 July 1967
- Nakhon Phanom Royal Thai Air Force Base, Thailand, 27 November 1967 – 22 September 1975

Air echelon operated from: Ubon Royal Thai Air Force Base, Thailand, 11–13 April 1975
Air echelon operated from: USS Midway (CV-41), 20 April 1975 – 2 May 1975
Air echelon operated from: U-Tapao Royal Thai Naval Airfield, Thailand, 2–5 May and 14–16 May 1975

- RAF Woodbridge, England, 1 May 1988

Deployed to Batman Air Base, Turkey, 13 January 1991 – 18 March 1991
Deployed to Diyarbkir Air Base, Turkey, 6 April 1991 – 10 June 1991

- RAF Alconbury, England, 1 April 1992

Deployed at: Brindisi Air Base, Italy and Incirlik Air Base, Turkey, 2 March 1993 – 12 July 1993.

- RAF Mildenhall, England, – 9 October 2007
- Yokota Air Base, Japan, 1 July 2019 – present

=== Aircraft ===
- Curtiss P-36 Hawk, 1940–1941
- Curtiss P-40 Warhawk, 1941–1942
- H-21 Shawnee, 1956–1957
- Sikorsky CH-3, 1967–1971
- Sikorsky CH-53E Super Stallion, 1970–1975
- Sikorsky MH-53 Pave Low, 1988–2007.
- CV-22 Osprey, 2019–present
