= 34th Training Wing =

Wing of the United States Air Force

Commandant of Cadets (formerly 34th Training Wing)

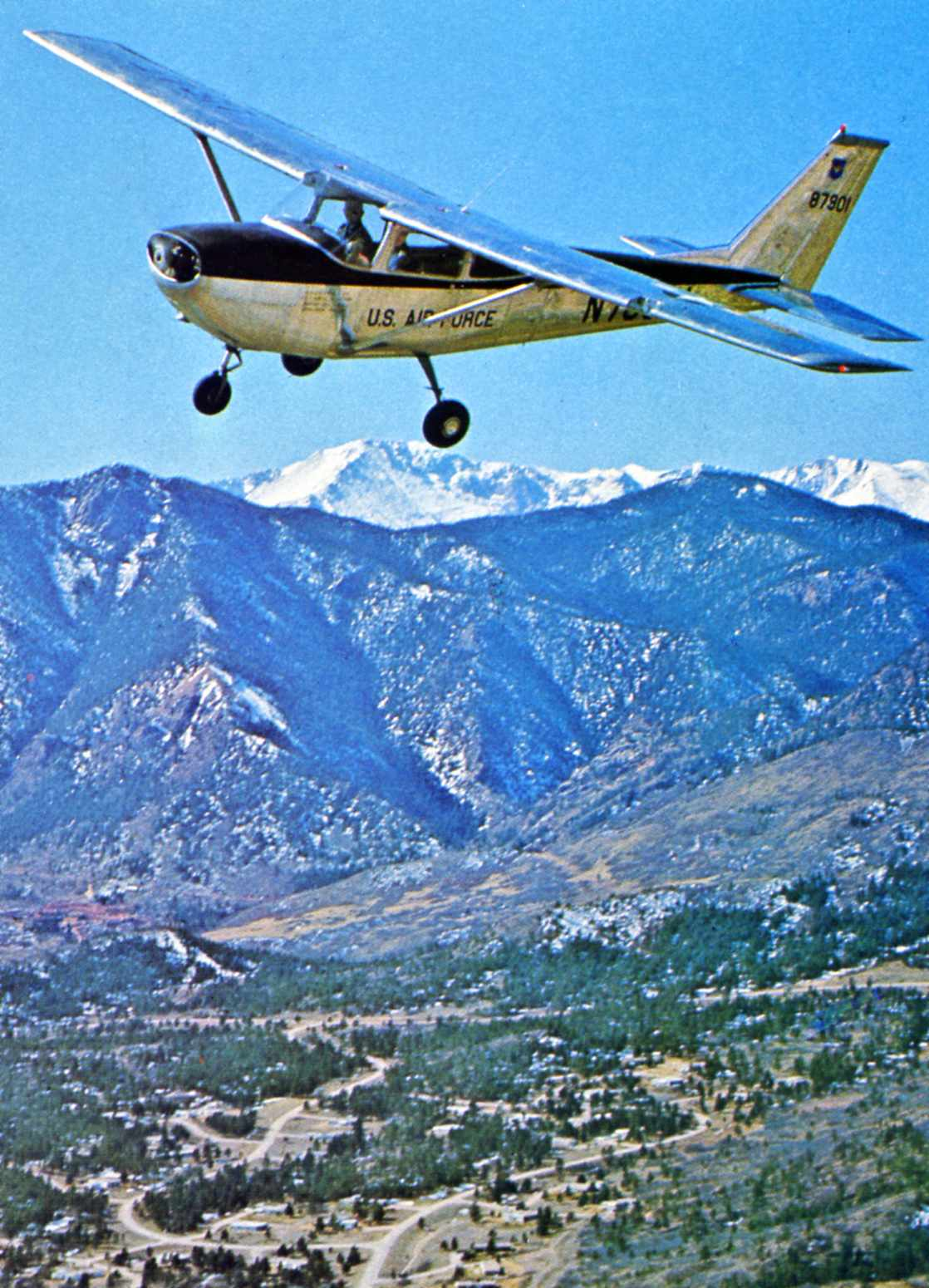
- T-41 Mescalero over the United States Air Force Academy
- Active: 1941–1945; 1963–1965; 1994–present
- Country: United States
- Branch: United States Air Force
- Role: Military Training
- Part of: United States Air Force Academy
- Garrison/HQ: Air Force Academy, Colorado
- Nickname: Vigilantes (Vietnam War)
- Motto: Valor to Victory
- Mascot: Falcon (Note: The falcon is the official mascot of the United States Air Force Academy. The costumed falcon appearing at athletic events is named "The Bird".)
- Engagements: Vietnam War
- Decorations: Air Force Outstanding Unit Award; Air Force Organizational Excellence Award

Commanders
- Commandant: Brig Gen Gavin P. Marks (2026)
- Notable commanders: Patrick K. Gamble; Susan Y. Desjardins

Insignia
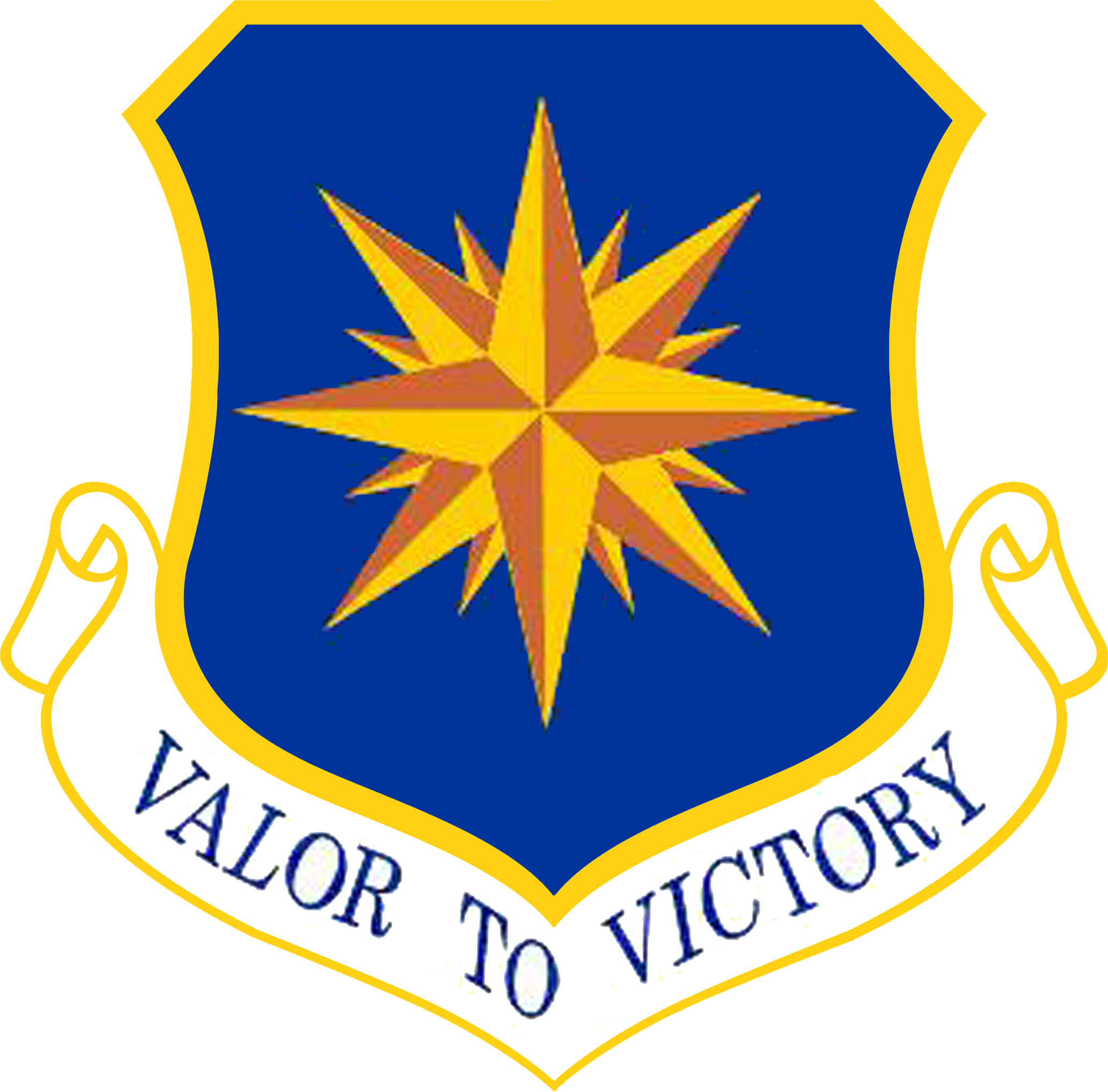
- 34th Training Wing emblem (Note: Modified on 15 October 1997 by putting it on the Air Force shield and adding a narrow yellow border.)

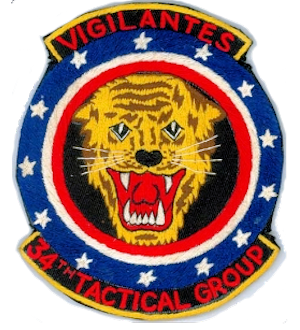
- Unofficial 34th Tactical Group emblem

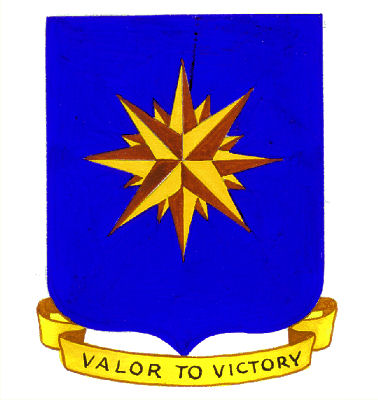
- 34th Bombardment Group emblem (Note: Approved 4 November 1941. Description: Azure, a compass rose or.)
- World War II Tail Code: Square S

The Commandant of Cadets is a named organization of the United States Air Force based at the United States Air Force Academy in Colorado Springs, Colorado. Until August 2006 the commander of the 34th Training Wing was "dual-hatted" as the Commandant of Cadets at the academy. In that month the 34th Wing became a named organization.

The organization was first activated in 1941 as the 34th Bombardment Group. Following the attack on Pearl Harbor, the group briefly participated in antisubmarine patrols. During most of 1942 and 1943, the group acted as a heavy bomber training unit. In early 1944, the unit began preparations to move overseas. It served with Eighth Air Force in England, from April 1944 until the end of the war, converting from the Consolidated B-24 Liberator to the Boeing B-17 Flying Fortress in the middle of combat operations. It returned to the United States after VE Day and was inactivated in August 1945.

The 34th Tactical Group was activated in the early days of American participation in the Vietnam War. It trained Republic of Vietnam Air Force airmen and engaged in combat operations and the operational testing of weapons and munitions until 1965, when the increasing American involvement in Vietnam caused it to be replaced by the larger 6251st Tactical Fighter Wing.

In 1984 the 34th Bombardment Group and the 34th Tactical Group were consolidated into a single unit. The consolidated unit was redesignated the 34th Training Wing and activated in October 1994 at the United States Air Force Academy, where it has served the Commandant of Cadets as the military training arm of the academy.

== Mission ==
The mission of the Commandant of Cadets is to educate and train potential United States Air Force officers as the administrative organization responsible for cadet leadership and military training programs, instruction in military and airmanship courses, and general supervision of cadet life activities.

== History ==
=== World War II ===
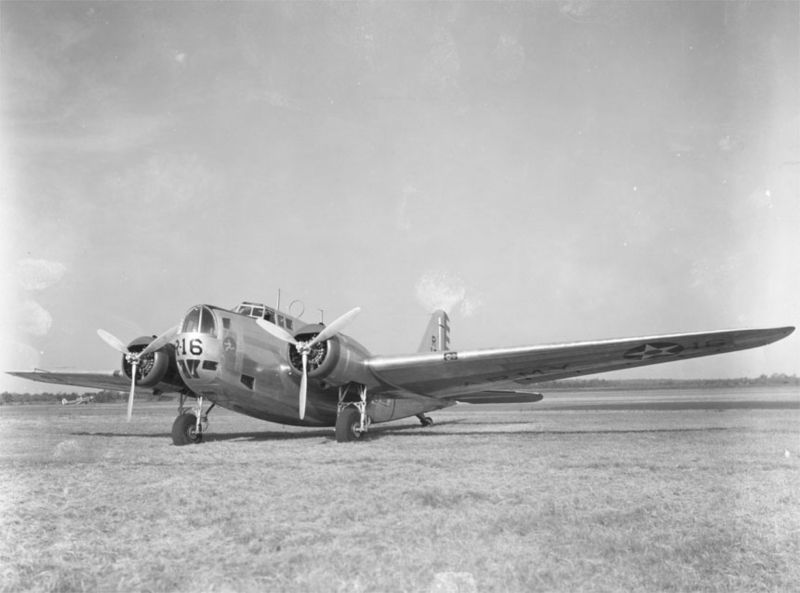
B-18 of an Air Corps reconnaissance squadron

The group was first activated at Langley Field, Virginia in January 1941 as the 34th Bombardment Group and equipped with a mixture of B-17C and B-17D Flying Fortresses and Douglas B-18 Bolos. Its original squadrons were the 4th, 7th, and 18th Bombardment Squadrons, while the 1st Reconnaissance Squadron) was initially assigned to General Headquarters Air Force, but attached to the 34th Bombardment Group. The 34th Group moved to Westover Field, Massachusetts four months after it was activated.

After the Pearl Harbor attack the group began antisubmarine patrols off the Northeast coast of the United States, but soon became part of Western Defense Command and moved to Pendleton Field, Oregon. By the summer of 1942, Second Air Force had become primarily a heavy bomber training force and the group became a B-17 Replacement Training Unit (RTU) at Geiger Field. RTUs were oversized units which trained aircrews prior to their deployment to combat theaters.

On 15 December 1942 the group moved to Blythe Army Air Base, California a base of the Desert Training Center. The 34th provided cadres for a number of heavy bomber groups that served with Eighth Air Force during this period.

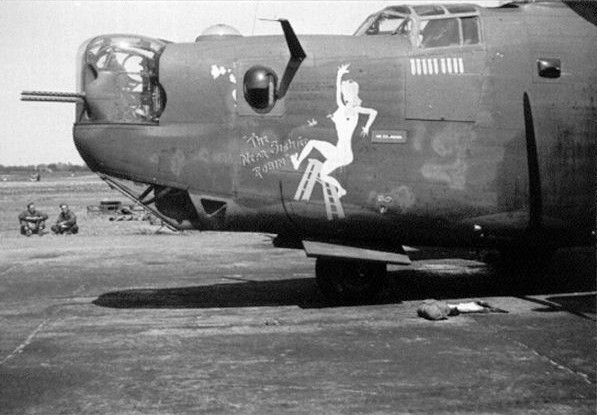
B-24H of the 7th Bomb Squadron (Note: The plane is Douglas-Tulsa B-24H-15-DT Serial 41-28851 of the 7th Bomb Squadron. This aircraft was damaged during a mission on 24 August 1944 and made an emergency landing in Sweden (MACR 8461). The aircraft was interned until the end of the war then repaired and flown back to the UK in 1945.)

The 34th began training with Consolidated B-24 Liberators for overseas combat operations on 5 January 1944. The ground echelon moved to the port of embarkation on 1 April 1944, while the air echelon began its overseas movement on 31 May 1944, taking the southern ferry route, from Florida to Trinidad, Brazil, West Africa and Marrakesh, arriving at RAF Valley, Wales. The group arrived at its permanent station, RAF Mendlesham, England, in April 1944 and entered combat on 23 May 1944.

The 34th flew 170 operations from Mendlesham, the first sixty-two while flying B-24H and B-24J Liberators and the remainder with B-17G Flying Fortresses. The group helped to prepare for Operation Overlord, the invasion of Normandy, by bombing airfields in France and Germany, and supported the June landings by attacking coastal defenses and communications. It supported ground forces at Saint-Lô in late July and struck V-1 flying bomb launch sites, gun emplacements, and supply lines throughout the summer of 1944.

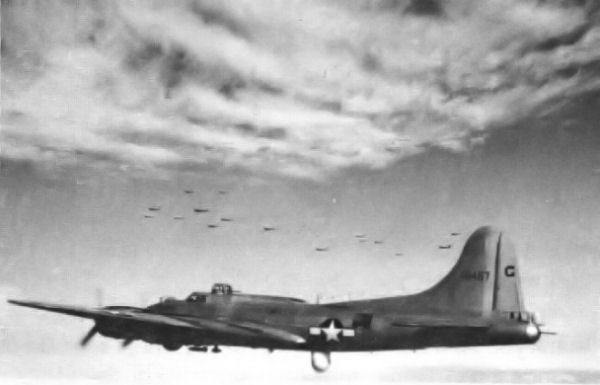
34th Bomb Group B-17G Flying Fortress (Note: The aircraft is Lockheed/Vega B-17G-65-VE Serial 44-8457.)

The mixture of B-24s and B-17s in the 3d Bombardment Division presented a number of operational problems, and in early 1944 plans had begun at VIII Bomber Command headquarters to standardize the division with the Flying Fortress. The group flew its last B-24 mission on 24 August 1944. It transferred its Liberators for overhaul and eventual transfer to units of the 2d Bombardment Division, and began converting to B-17s and flew its first mission with the new planes on 17 September 1944. The 34th engaged primarily in bombardment of strategic objectives from October 1944 to February 1945. Targets included marshalling yards in Ludwigshafen, Hamm, Osnabrück, and Darmstadt; oil centers in Bielefeld, Merseburg, Hamburg, and Misburg; factories in Berlin, Dalteln, and Hanover; and airfields in Münster, Neumünster, and Frankfurt.

During this period the group also supported ground forces during the Battle of the Bulge from December 1944 to January 1945. In March 1945, with few enemy industrial targets remaining and with Allied armies advancing across Germany, the 34th turned almost solely to interdicting enemy communications and supporting Allied ground forces. As training programs in the States accelerated, replacement crews arriving later in the war tended to be younger than those arriving earlier. One 34th crew, that of 2d Lt Joe Novick, was claimed to be the youngest in VIII Bomber Command. Lt Novicki was the "old man" at 21 and all other crew members were 19 or 20 years old in 1945. The 34th flew its last combat mission on 20 April 1945.

After V-E Day the group flew six missions carrying food to flooded areas of the Netherlands and transported prisoners of war from German camps to Allied centers. The group redeployed to the United States in June and July 1945. The first elements of the air echelon departed 19 June 1945. The ground echelon sailed aboard the RMS Queen Elizabeth from Southampton on 6 August 1945. Upon arrival in the states, group personnel were given 30 days leave. The group reassembled at Sioux Falls Army Air Field, South Dakota, where it was inactivated on 28 August 1945.

=== Vietnam War ===
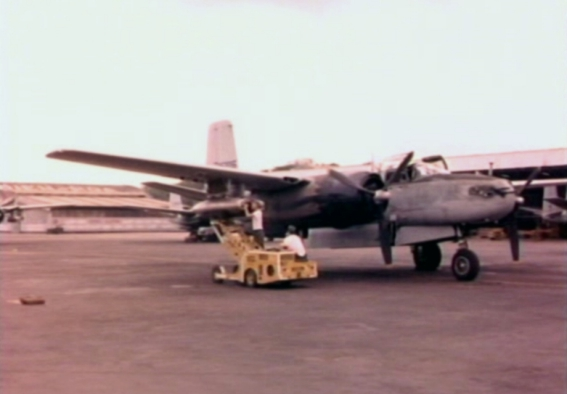
B-26B at Bien Hoa AB

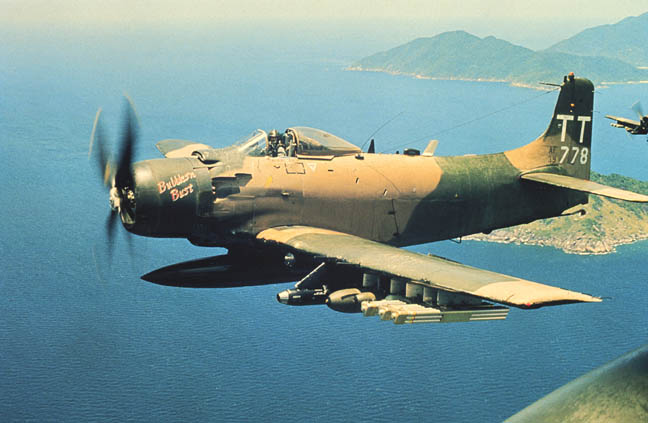
A-1H of the 602d Fighter Squadron

The 34th Tactical Group was activated in July 1963 to train Republic of Vietnam Air Force (VNAF) personnel in counter-insurgency operations. It trained VNAF strike pilots, forward air controllers, and observers. Its initial squadrons were the 1st Air Commando Squadron, a composite unit flying Douglas B-26 Invaders at first, and the 19th Tactical Air Support Squadron, equipped with Cessna O-1 Bird Dogs. Later, the 1st also operated Helio U-10 Couriers, North American T-28 Trojans and Douglas C-47 Skytrains. The Air Force intended to turn the 19th's Bird Dogs over to the VNAF, and the squadron was inactivated in August 1964. However, the Gulf of Tonkin incident altered these plans and the squadron was activated again in October. The squadron's forward air controllers became more critical as the war expanded into populated areas and it became necessary to minimize civilian casualties.

Plans had also been made to withdraw the 1st Air Commando Squadron and transfer its aircraft to the VNAF after replacing its AT-28s and B-26s with A-1Hs, but these plans were cancelled. Due to age and hard use in combat, two AT-28s lost their wings and crashed in March and April 1964, while in June all B-26s were grounded. The 1st only remained operational by borrowing nine T-28Bs from the VNAF. These incidents confirmed the plan to convert the squadron's attack aircraft to the Douglas A-1 Skyraider

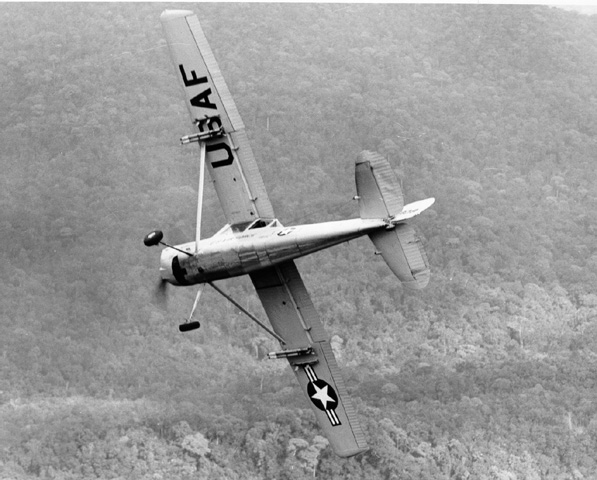
O-1 Bird Dog rolling in to mark a target

The 34th also flew combat missions, including close air support, fighter escort and interdiction, psychological warfare, aerial supply, forward air control and tactical liaison. It pioneered tactical weapons and munitions, such as the minigun, the daisycutter, and the gunship. In the fall of 1964, the 602d Fighter Squadron (Commando) was activated and assigned to the group. The Skyraider became the primary strike aircraft of the 1st and 602d Squadrons from this time.

The group controlled its first jet aircraft in 1964 when Martin B-57 Canberras of the 8th and 13th Bombardment Squadrons, stationed at Clark Air Base in the Philippines began to rotate to Bien Hoa, where they were attached to the group for operations. These were the first USAF jets in Viet Nam. Prior to the passage of the Gulf of Tonkin Resolution, the United States had interpreted the Geneva Accords as prohibiting jet combat aircraft from former French Indochina. On the night of 1 November, Viet Cong located just outside the perimeter of Bien Hoa attacked the base with mortars, destroying five B-57s and damaging an additional 15.

Aircrews of the 1st Air Commando Squadron performed the first combat tests of the FC-47 (later Douglas AC-47 Spooky) gunship beginning in December 1964. As more Air Force units moved to Bien Hoa, the 6251st Tactical Fighter Wing replaced the group in July 1965, and the 34th was inactivated.

=== Cadet training ===
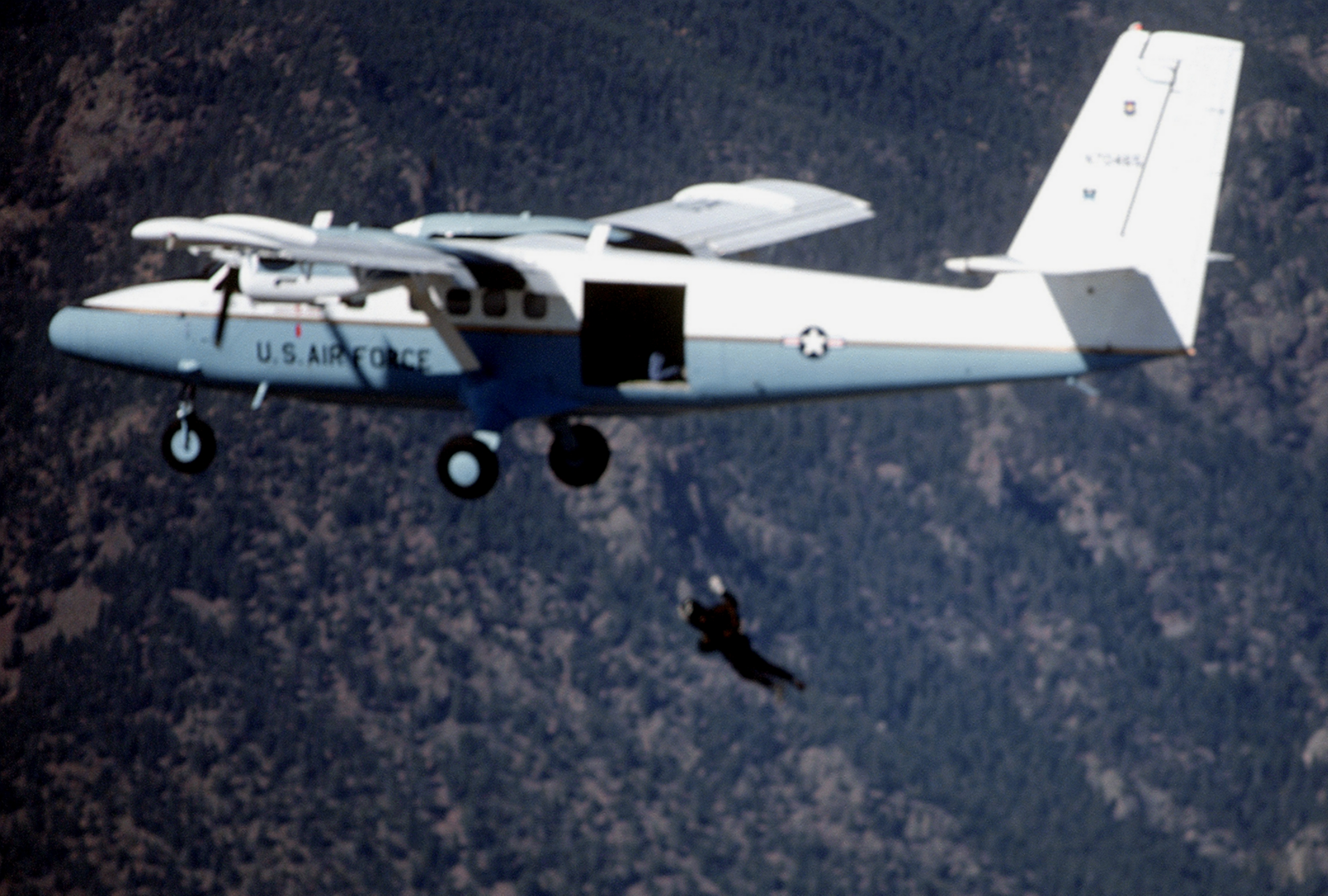
UV-18B USAF Academy parachute training

In September 1985, the 34th Bombardment Group and the 34th Tactical Group were consolidated into a single unit. In late 1994, the consolidated unit was redesignated the 34th Training Wing and activated with two assigned groups as the administrative organization responsible for cadet leadership and military training programs under the supervision of the Commandant of Cadets at the United States Air Force Academy. It is responsible for instruction in military and general supervision of cadet life activities. Until October 2004 it also provided airmanship courses. Its 34th Operations Group was inactivated in 2004 and its airmanship training mission became the responsibility of the 306th Flying Training Group of Air Education and Training Command. In 2006, it reorganized and its 34th Education Group was inactivated and replaced by four Cadet Groups.

== Lineage ==
34th Bombardment Group

- Established as the 34th Bombardment Group (Heavy) on 20 November 1940

Activated on 15 January 1941
Redesignated 34th Bombardment Group, c. 15 February 1944
Inactivated on 28 August 1945

- Consolidated with the 34th Tactical Group as the 34th Tactical Group on 31 January 1984

34th Training Wing

- Established as the 34th Tactical Group and activated, on 19 June 1963 (not organized)

Organized on 8 July 1963
Discontinued and inactivated on 8 July 1965

- Consolidated with the 34th Bombardment Group on 31 January 1984

Consolidated unit

- Redesignated 34th Training Wing on 30 September 1994

Activated on 31 October 1994
Redesignated Commandant of Cadets on 30 August 2006

=== Assignments ===
- 2d Bombardment Wing, 15 January 1941
- 4th Bombardment Wing, 3 June 1941
- I Bomber Command, 5 September 1941
- 2d (later, Second) Air Force, 27 January 1942
- 16th Bombardment Training Wing (later, 16 Bombardment Operational Training Wing), c. 15 December 1942
- 93d Combat Bombardment Wing, c. 26 April 1944
- 45th Combat Bombardment Wing, 24 May 1945
- 20th Bombardment Wing, 18 June – 28 August 1945
- Pacific Air Forces, 19 June 1963 (not organized)
- 2d Air Division, 8 July 1963 – 8 July 1965
- United States Air Force Academy, 31 October 1994 – present

=== Components ===
Groups

- 34th Operations Group: 31 October 1994 – 4 October 2004
- 34th Education Group: 7 November 1994 – 1 August 2006
- 1st Cadet Group: 1 August 2006 – present
- 2d Cadet Group: 1 August 2006 – present
- 3d Cadet Group: 1 August 2006 – present
- 4th Cadet Group: 1 August 2006 – present

Squadrons

- 1st Reconnaissance (Squadron later 391st Bombardment Squadron): attached 15 January 1941 – 24 February 1942, assigned 25 February 1942 – 28 August 1945
- 1st Air Commando Squadron: 8 July 1963 – 8 July 1965
- 4th Bombardment Squadron: 15 January 1941 – 28 August 1945
- 7th Bombardment Squadron: 15 January 1941 – 28 August 1945
- 8th Bombardment Squadron: attached 5 August – 3 November 1964
- 13th Bombardment Squadron: attached 5 August – 3 November 1964; 17 February – 16 May 1965
- 18th Bombardment Squadron: 15 January 1941 – 28 August 1945
- 19th Tactical Air Support Squadron: 8 July 1963 – 8 August 1964; 21 October 1964 – 8 July 1965
- 602d Fighter Squadron (Commando): 18 October 1964 – 8 July 1965
- 34th Training Support Squadron: 24 February 2026 – Present

=== Stations ===
- Langley Field, Virginia, 15 January 1941
- Westover Field, Massachusetts, 29 May 1941
- Pendleton Field, Oregon, 27 January 1942
- Davis-Monthan Field, Arizona, 13 May 1942
- Geiger Field, Washington, 4 July 1942
- Ephrata Army Air Base, Washington, 1 December 1942
- Bishop Army Air Field, California, 15 December 1942 – April 1944
- RAF Mendlesham (USAAF Station 156), England, 26 April 1944-c. 25 July 1945
- Sioux Falls Army Air Field, South Dakota, Aug-28 August 1945
- Bien Hoa Air Base, South Vietnam, 8 July 1963 – 8 July 1965
- United States Air Force Academy, Colorado, 31 October 1994 – present

=== Aircraft ===
- Boeing B-17C Flying Fortress (1941–1942)
- Boeing B-17D Flying Fortress (1941–1942)
- Boeing B-17G Flying Fortress (1944–1945)
- Douglas B-18 Bolo (1941)
- Consolidated B-24H Liberator (1942–1944)
- Consolidated B-24J Liberator (1942–1944)
- Douglas B-26 Invader (1963–1964)
- Martin B-57 Canberra (1964–1965)
- Cessna O-1 Bird Dog (1963–1965)
- Helio U-10 Courier (1963–1965)
- North American T-28 Trojan (1963–1964)
- Douglas C-47 Skytrain (1963–1965)
- Douglas AC-47 Spooky (1964–1965)
- Douglas A-1 Skyraider (1964–1965)
- Cessna T-41 Mescalero, (1994–2004)
- Cessna T-51, (1995–2004)
- de Havilland Canada UV-18 Twin Otter (1994–2004)

=== Awards and campaigns ===
Award streamer	Award	Dates	Notes
	Air Force Outstanding Unit Award	[8 July] 1963 – 31 Jul 1964	34th Tactical Group (Note: Although this award was earned in combat, it predates the authorization of the Combat "V" device for wear on the Air Force Outstanding Unit Award ribbon.)
	Air Force Outstanding Unit Award	1 September 1994 – 31 October 1995	34th Training Wing
	Air Force Organizational Excellence Award	1 January 2005 – 31 December 2006	34th Training Wing (later Commandant of Cadets)

Campaign Streamer	Campaign	Dates	Notes
	Antisubmarine	7 December 1941-c. 13 May 1942	34th Bombardment Group
	Air Offensive, Europe	23 April 1944 – 5 June 1944	34th Bombardment Group
	Normandy	6 June 1944 – 24 July 1944	34th Bombardment Group
	Northern France	25 July 1944 – 14 September 1944	34th Bombardment Group
	Rhineland	15 September 1944 – 21 March 1945	34th Bombardment Group
	Central Europe	22 March 1944 – 21 May 1945	34th Bombardment Group
	Air Combat, EAME Theater	7 December 1941 – 11 May 1945	34th Bombardment Group
	Vietnam Advisory	8 July 1963 – 1 March 1965	34th Tactical Group
	Vietnam Defensive	2 March 1965 – 8 July 1965	34th Tactical Group

== See also ==
- Commandant of Cadets of the United States Air Force Academy
- B-17 Flying Fortress units of the United States Army Air Forces
- B-24 Liberator units of the United States Army Air Forces
- List of B-57 units of the United States Air Force
- List of Douglas A-1 Skyraider operators
- List of Douglas A-26 Invader operators
- List of Douglas C-47 Skytrain operators
