= 7th Bombardment Squadron =

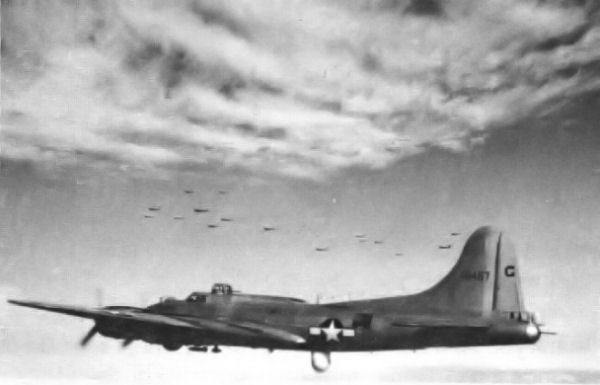
- 34th Bomb Group B-17G Flying Fortress (Note: The aircraft is Lockheed/Vega B-17G-65-VE Serial 44-8457)
- Active: 1941-1945, 1990-1992
- Country: United States
- Branch: United States Air Force
- Role: Bombardment
- Engagements: European Theater of Operations

Insignia
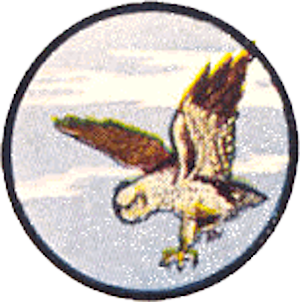
- 7th Bombardment Squadron emblem (Note: Approved 22 January 1942.)

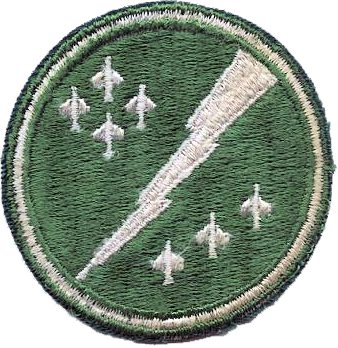
- Patch with 7th Tactical Reconnaissance emblem

The 7th Bombardment Squadron is an inactive United States Air Force unit. It was last assigned to the 34th Bombardment Group at Sioux Falls Army Air Field, South Dakota, where it was inactivated on 28 August 1945.

The squadron was activated in January 1941 at Langley Field, Virginia. Following the attack on Pearl Harbor, the squadron performed antisubmarine patrols. The squadron moved to the western United States and was a training unit until the end of 1943. It then trained for combat and moved to the European Theater of Operations in April 1944. It participated in combat from May 1944 until VE Day. It returned to the United States in the summer of 1945 and was inactivated.

== History ==
=== World War II ===
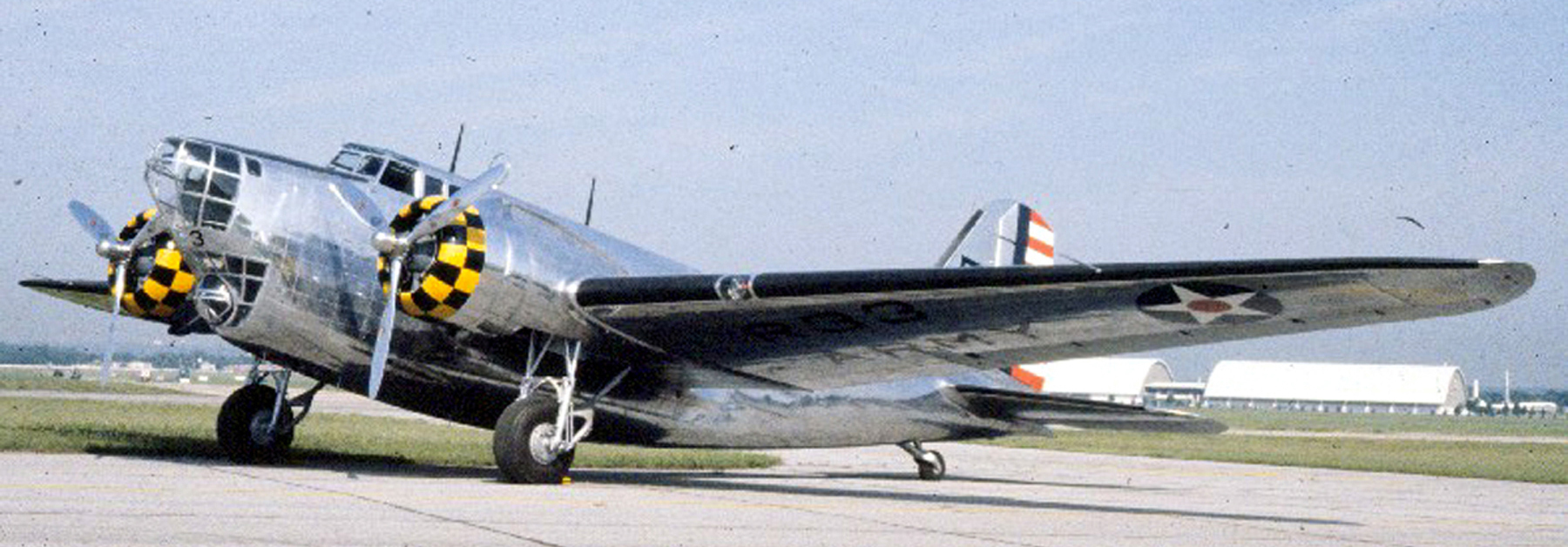
B-18 as flown by the squadron

The squadron was activated at Langley Field, Virginia in January 1941 as the 7th Bombardment Squadron, one of the original squadrons of the 34th Bombardment Group, and equipped with a mixture of B-17C and B-17D Flying Fortresses and Douglas B-18 Bolos. Along with the 34th Group, the squadron moved to Westover Field, Massachusetts four months after they were activated.

After the Pearl Harbor attack the squadron began antisubmarine patrols off the Northeast coast of the United States, but soon became part of Western Defense Command and moved to Pendleton Field, Oregon. By the summer of 1942, Second Air Force had become primarily a heavy bomber training force and the squadron became a B-17 Replacement Training Unit (RTU) at Geiger Field. RTUs were oversized units which trained aircrews prior to their deployment to combat theaters.

On 15 December 1942 the squadron moved to Blythe Army Air Base, California a base of the Desert Training Center. The unit provided cadres for a number of heavy bomber units that served with Eighth Air Force during this period.

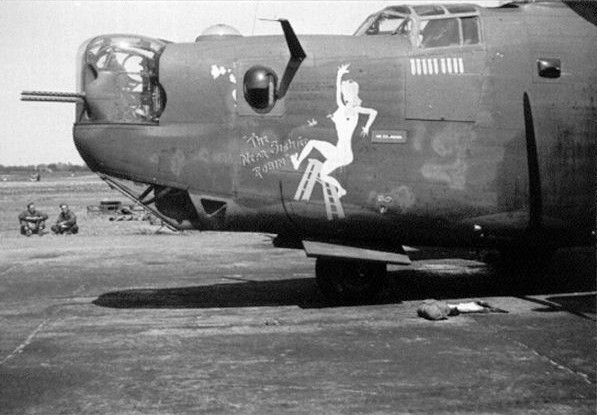
B-24H of the 7th Bomb Squadron (Note: The plane is Douglas-Tulsa B-24H-15-DT Serial 41-28851. This aircraft was damaged during a mission on 24 August 1944 and made an emergency landing in Sweden (MACR 8461). The aircraft was interned until the end of the war then repaired and flown back to the UK in 1945.)

The 7th began training with Consolidated B-24 Liberators for overseas combat operations on 5 January 1944. Its ground echelon moved to the port of embarkation on 1 April 1944, while the air echelon began its overseas movement on 31 May 1944, taking the southern ferry route, from Florida to Trinidad, Brazil, West Africa and Marrakesh arriving at RAF Valley, Wales. The squadron arrived at its permanent station, RAF Mendlesham, England, in April 1944 and entered combat on 23 May 1944.

The squadron helped to prepare for Operation Overlord, the invasion of Normandy, by bombing airfields in France and Germany, and supported the June landings by attacking coastal defenses and communications. It supported ground forces at Saint-Lô in late July and struck V-1 flying bomb launch sites, gun emplacements, and supply lines throughout the summer of 1944.

The mixture of B-24s and B-17s in the 3d Bombardment Division presented a number of operational problems, and in early 1944 plans had begun at VIII Bomber Command headquarters to standardize the division with the Flying Fortress. The 34th Group flew its last B-24 mission on 24 August 1944. It transferred its Liberators for overhaul and eventual transfer to units of the 2d Bombardment Division, and began converting to B-17s. It flew its first mission with the new planes on 17 September 1944. The squadron engaged primarily in bombardment of strategic objectives from October 1944 to February 1945. Targets included marshaling yards in Ludwigshafen, Hamm, Osnabrück, and Darmstadt; oil centers in Bielefeld, Merseburg, Hamburg, and Misburg; factories in Berlin, Dalteln, and Hanover; and airfields in Münster, Neumünster, and Frankfurt.

During this period the squadron also supported ground forces during the Battle of the Bulge from December 1944 to January 1945. In March 1945, with few enemy industrial targets remaining and with Allied armies advancing across Germany, the 7th turned almost solely to interdicting enemy communications and supporting Allied ground forces. The 7th flew its last combat mission on 20 April 1945.

After V-E Day the squadron flew missions carrying food to flooded areas of the Netherlands and transported prisoners of war from German camps to Allied centers. The squadron redeployed to the United States in June and July 1945. The first elements of the air echelon departed 19 June 1945. The ground echelon sailed aboard the RMS Queen Elizabeth from Southampton on 6 August 1945. Upon arrival in the states, unit personnel were given 30 days leave. The squadron reassembled at Sioux Falls Army Air Field, South Dakota, where it was inactivated on 28 August 1945.

=== Reconnaissance training ===
Reactivated in 1967, the 7th Tactical Reconnaissance Squadron was an RF-4C Phantom II reconnaissance pilot training organization. It trained many RF-4C pilots prior to their deployment to Southeast Asia during the Vietnam War. Inactivated in 1971 when parent 67th TRW moved from Mountain Home Air Force Base. Idaho to Bergstrom Air Force Base, Texas.

=== Flying training ===
The squadron was redesignated the 7th Flying Training Squadron and activated at Vance Air Force Base, Oklahoma in January 1990. It was inactivated in October 1992.

== Lineage ==
- Constituted as the 7th Bombardment Squadron (Heavy) on 20 November 1940

Activated on 15 January 1941
Redesignated 7th Bombardment Squadron, Heavy on 20 August 1943
Inactivated on 28 August 1945

- Redesignated 7th Tactical Reconnaissance Squadron

Activated on 15 December 1967
Inactivated on 15 April 1971

- Redesignated 7th Flying Training Squadron on 13 December 1989

Activated c. 19 January 1990
Inactivated c. 1 October 1992

=== Assignments ===
- 34th Bombardment Group, 15 January 1941 – 28 August 1945
- 67th Tactical Reconnaissance Wing, 15 December 1967 – 15 October 1971
- 71st Flying Training Wing, 19 January 1990
- 71st Operations Group, 15 December 1991 – 1 October 1992

=== Stations ===
- Langley Field, Virginia, 15 January 1941
- Westover Field, Massachusetts, 29 May 1941
- Pendleton Field, Oregon, c. 25 January 1942
- Davis-Monthan Field, Arizona, c. 13 May 1942
- Geiger Field, Washington, 1 Ju1y 1942
- Ephrata Army Air Base, Washington, 1 December 1942
- Great Falls Army Air Base, Montana, c. 15 January 1943
- Ephrata Army Air Base, Washington 31 January 1943
- Blythe Army Air Base, California, 1 February 1943
- Salinas Army Air Base, California, 29 May 1943
- Blythe Army Air Base, California, 13 July 1943 – c. 2 April 1944
- RAF Mendlesham (AAF-156), England, c. 23 April 1944 – 24 July 1945
- Sioux Falls Army Air Field, South Dakota, c. 13 – 28 August 1945
- Mountain Home Air Force Base, Idaho, 15 December 1967 – 15 October 1971
- Vance Air Force Base, Oklahoma, c. 19 January 1990 – c. 1 October 1992

=== Aircraft ===
- Stearman PT-17 Kaydet, 1941
- Consolidated LB-30B Liberator, 1941
- Douglas B-18 Bolo, 1941
- Boeing B-17C Flying Fortress, 1941–1942
- Boeing B-17D Flying Fortress, 1941–1942
- Consolidated B-24H Liberator, 1942-1944
- Consolidated B-24J Liberator, 1942-1944
- Boeing B-17G Flying Fortress, 1944–1945
- McDonnell RF-4 Phantom II, 1967-1971

=== Campaigns ===
Campaign Streamer	Campaign	Dates	Notes
	Antisubmarine	7 December 1941-c. 13 May 1942	7th Bombardment Squadron
	Air Offensive, Europe	23 April 1944 – 5 June 1944	7th Bombardment Squadron
	Normandy	6 June 1944 – 24 July 1944	7th Bombardment Squadron
	Northern France	25 July 1944 – 14 September 1944	7th Bombardment Squadron
	Rhineland	15 September 1944 – 21 March 1945	7th Bombardment Squadron
	Cent ral Europe	22 March 1944 – 21 May 1945	7th Bombardment Squadron
	Air Combat, EAME Theater	7 December 1941 – 11 May 1945	7th Bombardment Squadron

== See also ==
- B-17 Flying Fortress units of the United States Army Air Forces
- B-24 Liberator units of the United States Army Air Forces
