= 18th Special Operations Test and Evaluation Squadron =

18th Special Operations Test and Evaluation Squadron

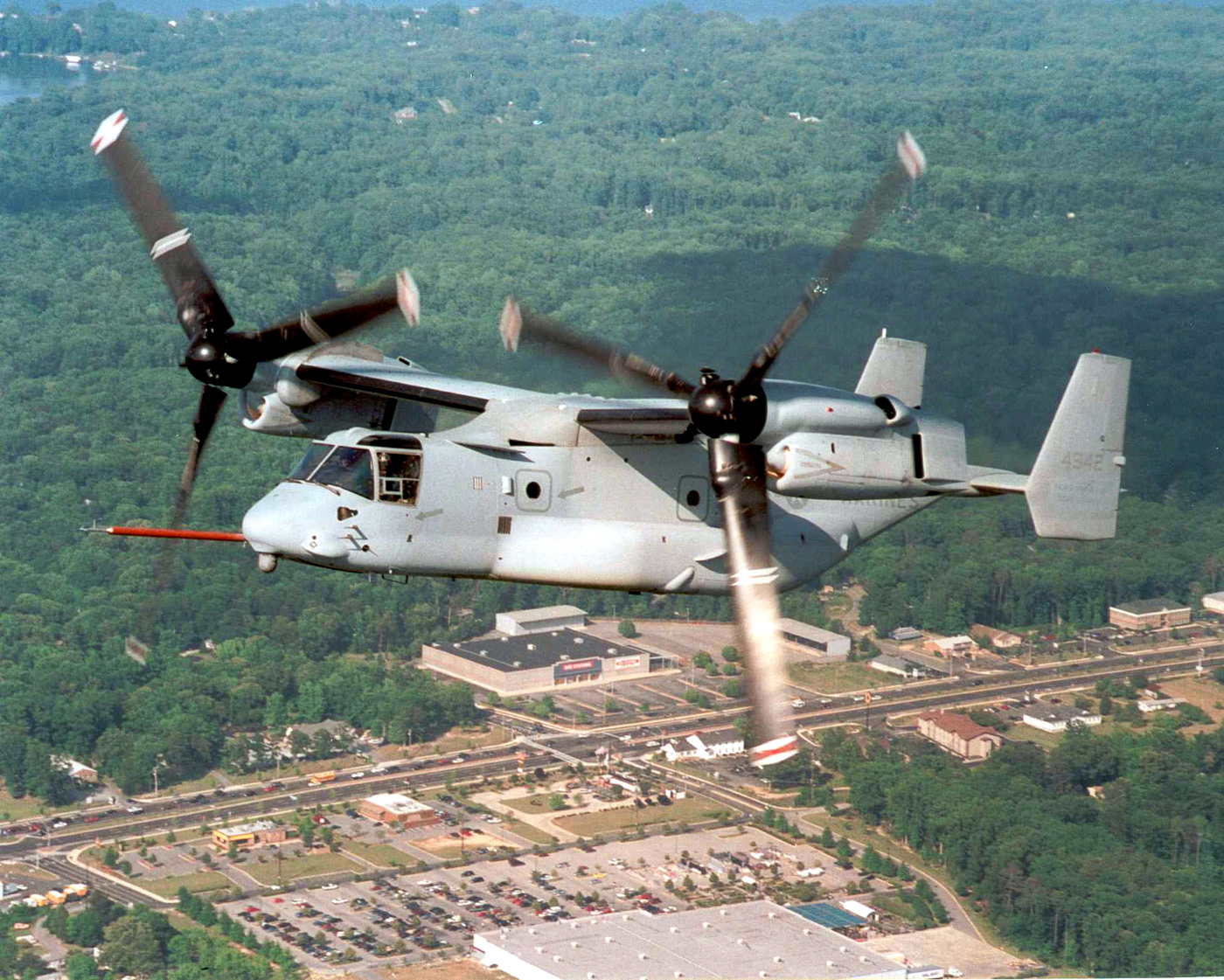
- 18th Flight Test Squadron V-22 Osprey, 2002
- Active: 1941–1945; 1969–1972; 1991–1994; 1994–present
- Country: United States
- Branch: United States Air Force
- Type: Special Operations
- Part of: Air Force Special Operations Command
- Garrison/HQ: Hurlburt Field
- Nickname(s): Stinger (1969–1972, 2019-present)
- Motto(s): Vengeance by Night (1969–1972)
- Engagements: Antisubmarine Campaign; European Theater of Operations; Vietnam War
- Decorations: Presidential Unit Citation; Air Force Outstanding Unit Award with Combat "V" Device; Air Force Outstanding Unit Award; Republic of Vietnam Gallantry Cross with Palm

Insignia
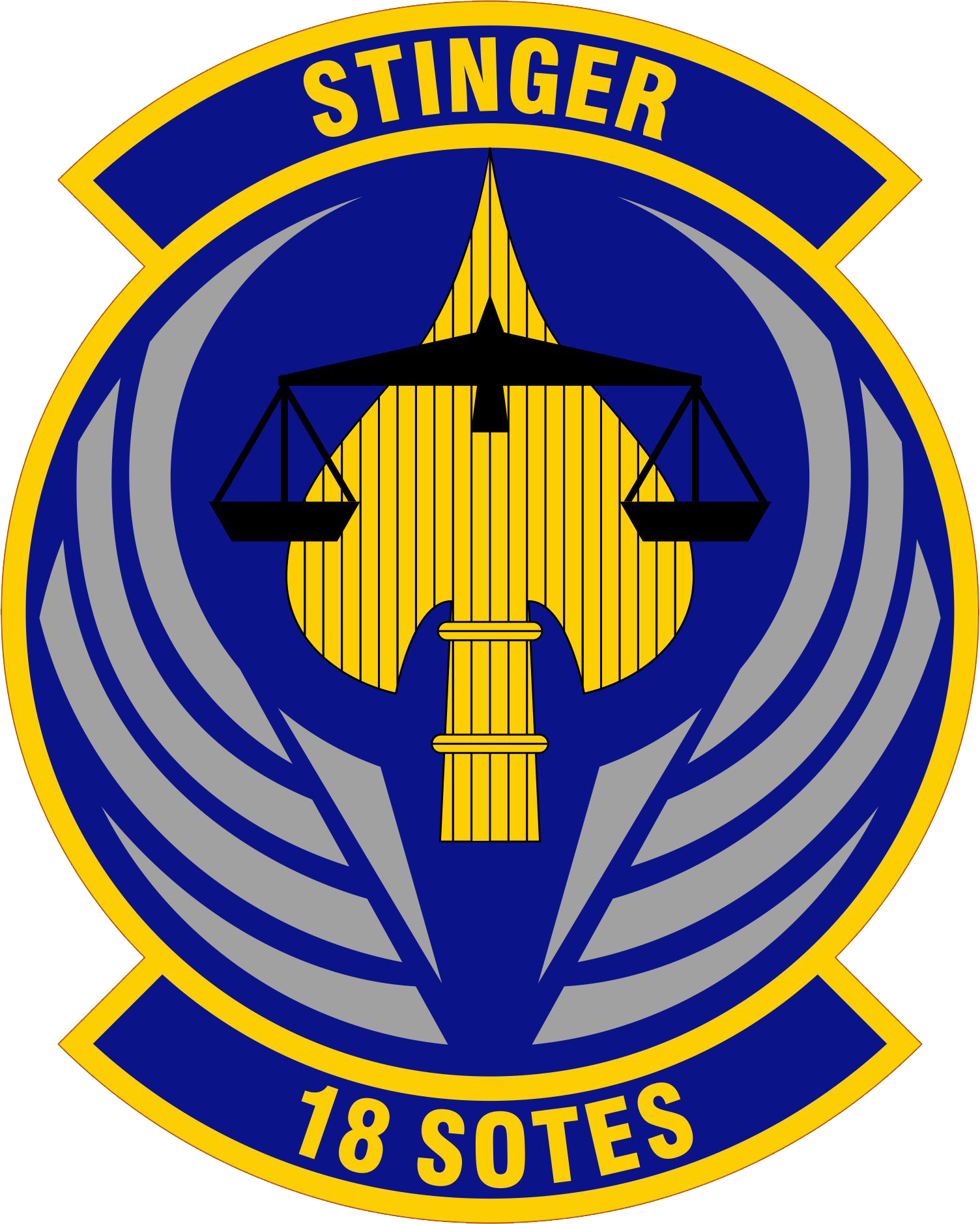
- 18th Special Operations Test and Evaluation Squadron emblem

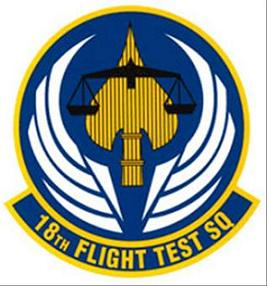
- 18th Flight Test Squadron emblem (Note: Approved 13 July 1992. This emblem was modified to reflect the unit's new designation and return the "Stinger" nickname on 21 October 2019.)

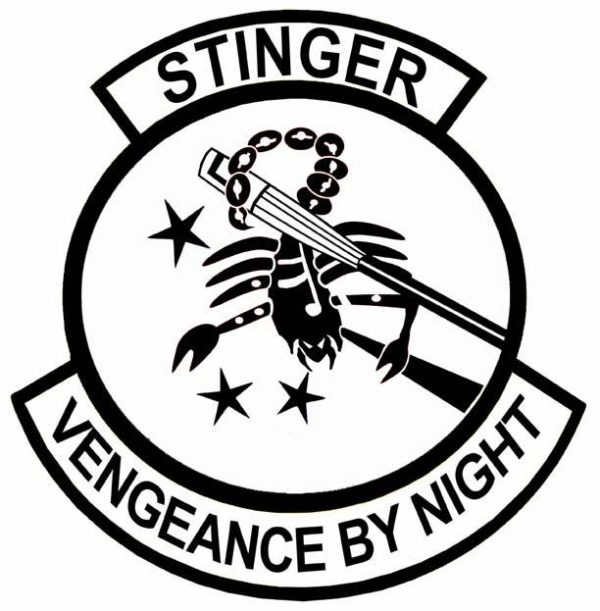
- 18th Special Operations Squadron emblem (Note: Approved 20 December 1969.)

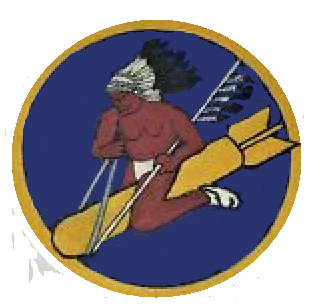
- 18th Bombardment Squadron emblem (Note: Approved 20 March 1942)

The 18th Special Operations Test and Evaluation Squadron (18 SOTES) is an active unit of the United States Air Force, based at Hurlburt Field, Florida. The squadron performs field testing for Air Force Special Operations Command, evaluating aircraft, equipment, and tactics in realistic battlespace environments to provide decision-makers with accurate, timely, and complete assessments of mission capability. From concept development to system fielding, the unit's mission improves the survivability and combat capability of special operations forces worldwide.

The first predecessor of the squadron is the U.S. Army Air Forces 18th Bombardment Squadron, which was activated in January 1941 as the United States expanded its military in preparation for World War II. Following the Japanese attack on Pearl Harbor, the squadron moved to the Pacific Northwest, conducting antisubmarine warfare patrols. In the summer of 1942, it became a Replacement Training Unit for heavy bomber crews. In late 1943, it began training for overseas deployment and entered combat in the European Theater of Operations in 1944, participating in the strategic bombing campaign against Germany. Following V-E Day, the squadron returned to the United States and was inactivated in August 1945.

The second predecessor of the squadron was activated in 1969 as the USAF 18th Special Operations Squadron. After training in the United States with Fairchild AC-119K Stingers, it deployed to South Vietnam and then to Thailand as a gunship unit. It earned a Presidential Unit Citation and four Air Force Outstanding Unit Awards with Combat "V" Device before inactivating in 1972. The two squadrons were consolidated into a single unit in 1985. The squadron was activated as the 18th Test Squadron in 1991, and has served in the test role ever since, except for a brief inactive period in 1994.

== Mission ==
The 18th Special Operations Test and Evaluation Squadron is the "independent field test agency" of Air Force Special Operations Command (AFSOC). It has one detachment at Edwards Air Force Base, California. The squadron evaluates aircraft, equipment and tactics in realistic battlespace environments to provide decision makers accurate, timely and complete assessments of mission capability. From concept development to system fielding, the unit's mission improves the survivability and combat capability of special operations forces worldwide.

== Units ==
The 18th SOTES is composed of approximately 96 people. The squadron consists of seven flights: fixed wing, vertical lift, operations analysis, combat applications, special missions, instrumentation and mission support.

The detachment at Edwards Air Force Base is responsible for operational test and evaluation and tactics development and evaluation of the MV/CV-22 Osprey and supports Headquarters Air Force Operational Test and Evaluation Center in conducting joint tests with the Navy and Marine Corps.

== History ==
=== World War II ===
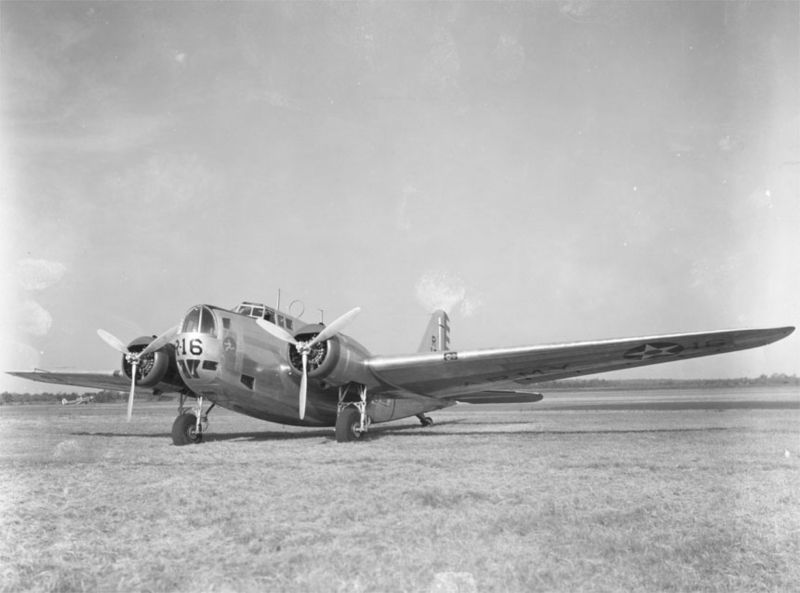
B-18 as flown by the squadron

The squadron was activated at Langley Field, Virginia in January 1941 as the 18th Bombardment Squadron, one of the original squadrons of the 34th Bombardment Group, and equipped with a mixture of B-17C and B-17D Flying Fortresses and Douglas B-18 Bolos. Along with the 34th Group, the squadron moved to Westover Field, Massachusetts four months after they were activated.

After the Pearl Harbor attack the squadron began antisubmarine patrols off the Northeast coast of the United States, but soon became part of Western Defense Command and moved to Pendleton Field, Oregon. By the summer of 1942, Second Air Force had become primarily a heavy bomber training force and the squadron became a B-17 Replacement Training Unit (RTU) at Geiger Field. RTUs were oversized units which trained aircrews prior to their deployment to combat theaters.

On 15 December 1942 the squadron moved to Blythe Army Air Base, California a base of the Desert Training Center. The unit provided cadres for a number of heavy bomber units that served with Eighth Air Force during this period.

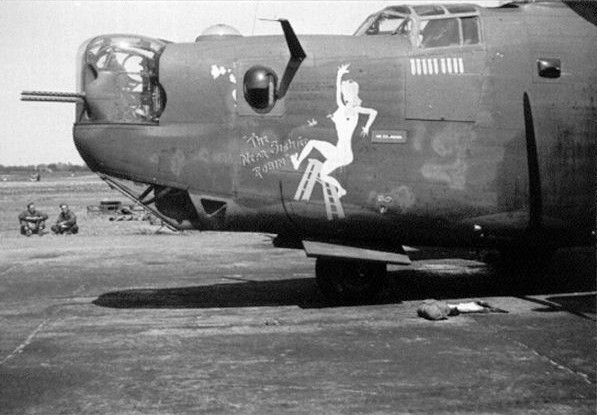
B-24H of the 34th Bomb Group (Note: The plane is Douglas-Tulsa built Consolidated B-24H-15-DT Serial 41-28851. This aircraft was damaged during a mission on 24 August 1944 and made an emergency landing in Sweden (MACR 8461). The aircraft was interned until the end of the war then repaired and flown back to the UK in 1945.)

The 18th began training with Consolidated B-24 Liberators for overseas combat operations on 5 January 1944. Its ground echelon moved to the port of embarkation on 1 April 1944, while the air echelon began its overseas movement on 31 May 1944, taking the southern ferry route, from Florida to Trinidad, Brazil, West Africa and Marrakesh arriving at RAF Valley, Wales. The squadron arrived at its permanent station, RAF Mendlesham, England, in April 1944 and entered combat on 23 May 1944.

The squadron helped to prepare for Operation Overlord, the invasion of Normandy, by bombing airfields in France and Germany, and supported the June landings by attacking coastal defenses and communications. It supported ground forces at Saint-Lô in late July and struck V-1 flying bomb launch sites, gun emplacements, and supply lines throughout the summer of 1944.

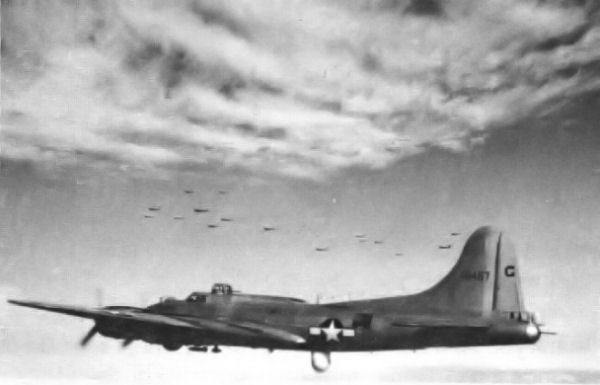
34th Bomb Group B-17G Flying Fortress (Note: The aircraft is Lockheed/Vega built Boeing B-17G-65-VE Serial 44-8457)

The mixture of B-24s and B-17s in the 3d Bombardment Division presented a number of operational problems, and in early 1944 plans had begun at VIII Bomber Command headquarters to standardize the division with the Flying Fortress. The 34th Group flew its last B-24 mission on 24 August 1944. It transferred its Liberators for overhaul and eventual transfer to units of the 2d Bombardment Division, and began converting to B-17s. It flew its first mission with the new planes on 17 September 1944. The squadron engaged primarily in bombardment of strategic objectives from October 1944 to February 1945. Targets included marshaling yards in Ludwigshafen, Hamm, Osnabrück, and Darmstadt; oil centers in Bielefeld, Merseburg, Hamburg, and Misburg; factories in Berlin, Dalteln, and Hanover; and airfields in Münster, Neumünster, and Frankfurt.

During this period the squadron also supported ground forces during the Battle of the Bulge from December 1944 to January 1945. In March 1945, with few enemy industrial targets remaining and with Allied armies advancing across Germany, the 18th turned almost solely to interdicting enemy communications and supporting Allied ground forces. The 18th flew its last combat mission on 20 April 1945.

After V-E Day the squadron flew missions carrying food to flooded areas of the Netherlands and transported prisoners of war from German camps to Allied centers. The squadron redeployed to the United States in June and July 1945. The first elements of the air echelon departed 19 June 1945. The ground echelon sailed aboard the RMS Queen Elizabeth from Southampton on 6 August 1945. Upon arrival in the states, unit personnel were given 30 days leave. The squadron reassembled at Sioux Falls Army Air Field, South Dakota, where it was inactivated on 28 August 1945.

=== Vietnam War ===
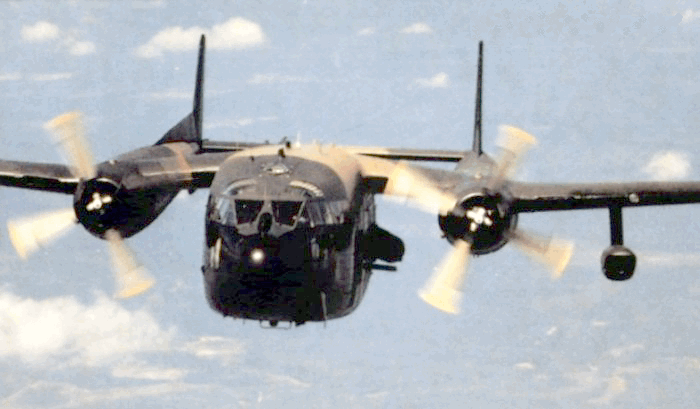
AC-119 Stinger

The second predecessor of the squadron was activated as the 18th Special Operations Squadron on 25 January 1969 at Lockbourne Air Force Base, Ohio, and deployed to Phan Rang Air Base, South Vietnam, the 18th SOS flew the Fairchild AC-119K Stinger gunship. The squadron's primary mission was the interdiction of enemy supply lines, close air support, and air base defense. Following the transfer of the aircraft to the Republic of Vietnam Air Force, the 18th was inactivated 31 December 1972.

=== Test and evaluation ===
On 1 October 1983, the Special Missions Operations Test and Evaluation Center (SMOTEC) was activated at Hurlburt Field by order of the Secretary of the Air Force as a direct reporting unit of Headquarters Military Airlift Command at Scott Air Force Base. SMOTEC was formed through the consolidation of the test and evaluation function previously assigned to the 1550th Aircrew Training and Test Wing, located at Kirtland Air Force Base, New Mexico, which was responsible for combat rescue and related test. It was also responsible for the informal test and evaluation staffs of the 2d Air Division and the 1st Special Operations Wing, at Hurlburt Field. Though testing was reassigned to SMOTEC in October 1983, most of the testing continued at Kirtland for the remainder of that year.

SMOTEC explored new special operations capabilities and developed better equipment and tactics to support Air Force special operations forces. It provided AFSOC with the centralized expertise for development and operational testing of new systems and tactics, proposed changes in doctrine, and recommended new requirements. The unit's colocation with the 1st Special Operations Wing made it ideally suited to perform the mission of improving the worldwide Air Force aim of special operations forces.

SMOTEC remained a direct reporting unit to Headquarters AFSOC until 31 March 1994. On 1 April 1994, it was inactivated and its assets, personnel, and equipment were "reflagged" as the 18th Flight Test Squadron, also a direct reporting unit to AFSOC.

== Lineage ==
18th Bombardment Squadron

- Constituted as the 18th Bombardment Squadron (Heavy) on 20 November 1940

Activated on 15 January 1941
Redesignated 18th Bombardment Squadron, Heavy on 20 August 1943
Inactivated on 28 August 1945

- Consolidated with the 18th Special Operations Squadron on 19 September 1985 as the 18th Special Operations Squadron

18th Special Operations Test and Evaluation Squadron

- Constituted as the 18th Special Operations Squadron on 16 January 1969

Activated on 25 January 1969
Inactivated on 31 December 1972

- Consolidated with the 18th Bombardment Squadron, Heavy on 19 September 1985 (remained inactive)
- Redesignated 18th Test Squadron on 1 July 1991

Activated on 15 July 1991
Redesignated 18th Flight Test Squadron on 23 March 1994
Inactivated on 1 April 1994
Activated on 1 April 1994
Redesignated 18th Special Operations Test and Evaluation Squadron on 26 July 2019

=== Assignments ===
- 34th Bombardment Group, 15 January 1941 – 28 August 1945
- 1st Special Operations Wing, 25 January 1969
- 4410th Combat Crew Training Wing, 15 July 1969
- 14th Special Operations Wing, 1 October 1969
- 56th Special Operations Wing, 25 August 1971 – 31 December 1972
- Special Missions Operational Test and Evaluation Center, 15 July 1991 – 1 April 1994
- Air Force Special Operations Command, 1 April 1994
- Twenty-Third Air Force, 1 January 2008
- Air Force Special Operations Air Warfare Center, 11 February 2013
- 492d Special Operations Wing, 10 May 2017

=== Stations ===
- Langley Field, Virginia, 15 January 1941
- Westover Field, Massachusetts, 29 May 1941
- Pendleton Field, Oregon, 27 January 1942
- Davis-Monthan Field, Arizona, 13 May 1942
- Geiger Field, Washington, 4 July 1942
- Ephrata Army Air Base, Washington, 1 December 1942
- Blythe Army Air Base, California, 7 December 1942
- Salinas Army Air Base, California, c. 29 May 1943

Operated from Kern County Airport, Bakersfield, California, 22 June – 13 July 1943

- Blythe Army Air Base, California, 13 July 1943 – c. 2 April 1944
- RAF Mendlesham (AAF-156), England, 23 April 1944 – 24 July 1945
- Sioux Falls Army Air Field, South Dakota, c. 13 – 28 August 1945
- Lockbourne Air Force Base, Ohio, 25 January – 1 October 1969
- Phan Rang Air Base, South Vietnam, October 1969
- Nakhon Phanom Royal Thai Air Force Base, Thailand, 25 August 1971 – 31 December 1972
- Edwards Air Force Base, California, 15 July 1991 – 1 April 1994
- Hurlburt Field, Florida, 1 April 1994 – present

=== Aircraft ===
- Stearman PT-17 Kaydet, 1941
- Consolidated LB-30B Liberator, 1941
- Douglas B-18 Bolo, 1941
- Boeing B-17C Flying Fortress, 1941–1943
- Boeing B-17D Flying Fortress, 1941–1943
- North American B-25 Mitchell, 1943–1944
- Consolidated B-24H Liberator, 1943–1944
- Consolidated B-24J Liberator, 1943–1944
- Boeing B-17G Flying Fortress, 1944–1945
- Fairchild AC-119K Stinger, 1969–1972
- Lockheed AC-130H/U Spectre/Spooky, 1991–1994; 1994 – present
- Lockheed MC-130P Combat Shadow, 1994 – present
- Sikorsky MH-53 Pave Low, 1994 – present.
- Lockheed MC-130E/H Combat Talon, 1994 – present.
- Bell Boeing CV-22 Osprey, 1996 – present
