= 91st Air Refueling Squadron =

US Air Force unit

91st Air Refueling Squadron

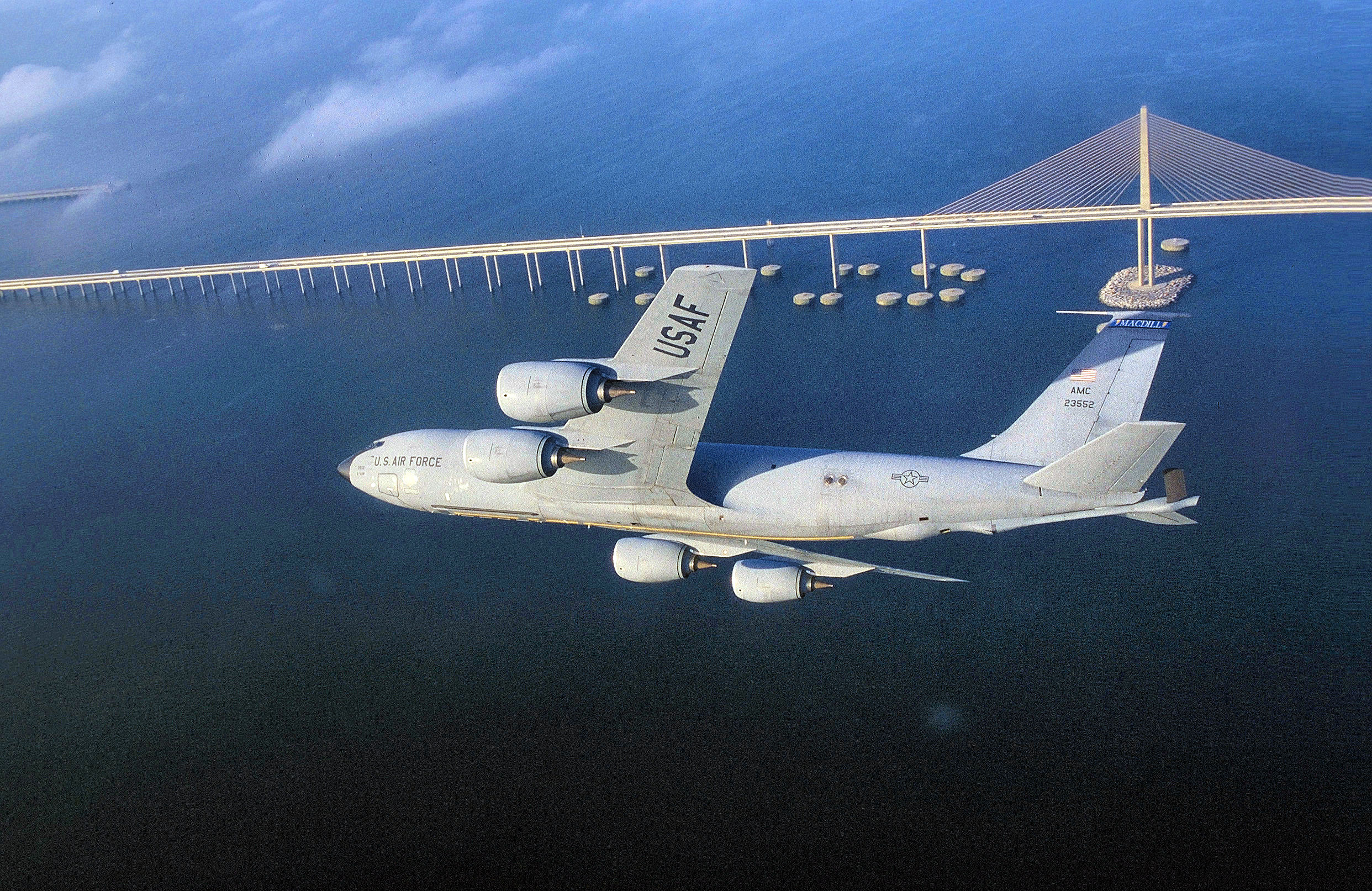
- KC-135R of the 91st Air Refueling Squadron over Tampa Bay
- Active: 1941–1945; 1950–1987; 1988–present
- Country: United States
- Branch: United States Air Force
- Role: Aerial refueling
- Part of: Air Mobility Command
- Garrison/HQ: MacDill Air Force Base
- Engagements: European Theater of Operations
- Decorations: Air Force Outstanding Unit Award

Insignia
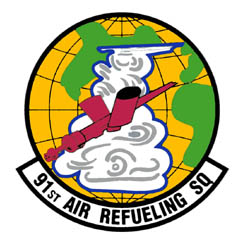
- 91st Air Refueling Squadron emblem (Note: Approved 3 June 1952.)

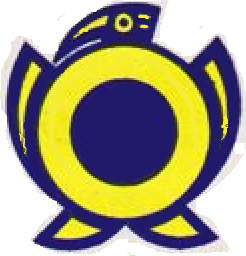
- 391st Bombardment Squadron emblem (Note: Approved for 1st Reconnaissance Squadron 24 September 1941.)

The 91st Air Refueling Squadron is a United States Air Force unit that is part of the 6th Air Mobility Wing at MacDill Air Force Base, Florida. It operates the Boeing KC-135R Stratotanker aircraft conducting air refueling missions.

The squadron was first activated in January 1941 as the 1st Reconnaissance Squadron at Langley Field, Virginia. Following the attack on Pearl Harbor, the squadron performed antisubmarine patrols. In the spring of 1942 it was renamed the 391st Bombardment Squadron and became part of the 34th Bombardment Group, to which it had been attached since activation. The squadron moved to the western United States and trained until April 1944 when it moved to the European Theater of Operations, where it participated in combat until VE Day. It returned to the United States in the summer of 1945 and was inactivated.

== Mission ==
The squadron provides air refueling and airlift for combatant commanders. It operates the Boeing KC-135R Stratotanker, a long-range tanker aircraft capable of refueling a variety of aircraft in mid-air, anywhere in the world and under any weather condition. The 91st's KC-135s have supported US military operations all over the world.

== History ==
=== World War II ===
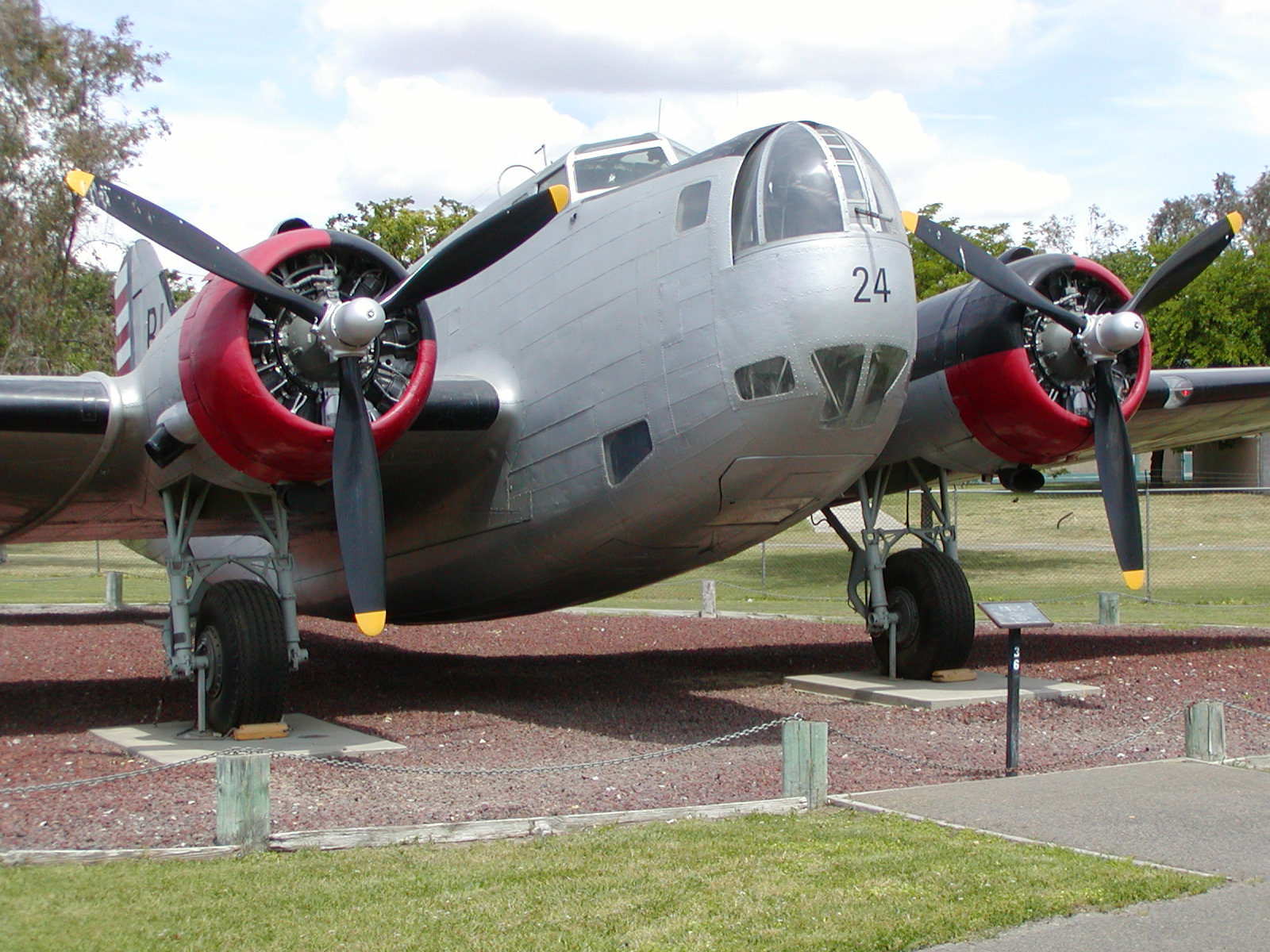
B-18 on display at the Castle Air Museum

The squadron was first activated at Langley Field, Virginia in January 1941 as the 1st Reconnaissance Squadron, a long-range reconnaissance squadron, equipped with a mixture of B-17C and B-17D Flying Fortresses and Douglas B-18 Bolos. It was initially assigned to General Headquarters Air Force (GHQ AF), but was attached to the 34th Bombardment Group per GHQ AF policy of attaching a reoconnaissace squadron to each bombardment group. Along with the 34th Group, the squadron moved to Westover Field, Massachusetts four months after they were activated.

After the Pearl Harbor attack the squadron began antisubmarine patrols off the Northeast coast of the United States, but soon became part of Western Defense Command and moved to Pendleton Field, Oregon. By the summer of 1942, Second Air Force had become primarily a heavy bomber training force and the squadron, called the 391st Bombardment Squadron since May, became a B-17 Replacement Training Unit (RTU) at Geiger Field. RTUs were oversized units which trained aircrews prior to their deployment to combat theaters.

On 15 December 1942 the squadron moved to Blythe Army Air Base, California a base of the Desert Training Center. The unit provided cadres for a number of heavy bomber units that served with Eighth Air Force during this period.

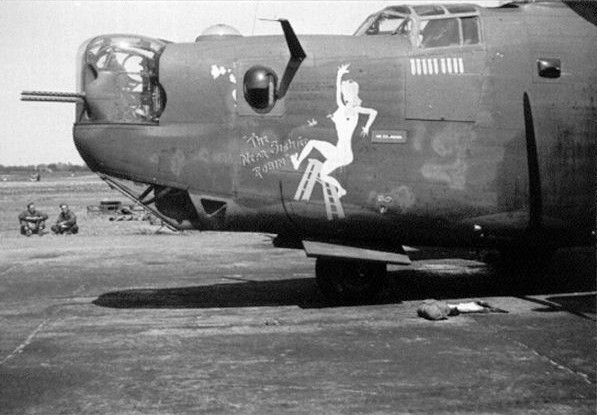
B-24H of the 34th Bomb Group (Note: The plane is Douglas-Tulsa built Consolidated B-24H-15-DT Serial 41-28851 of the 7th Bomb Squadron. This aircraft was damaged during a mission on 24 August 1944 and made an emergency landing in Sweden (MACR 8461). The aircraft was interned until the end of the war then repaired and flown back to the UK in 1945.)

The 391st began training with Consolidated B-24 Liberators for overseas combat operations on 5 January 1944. Its ground echelon moved to the port of embarkation on 1 April 1944, while the air echelon began its overseas movement on 31 May 1944, taking the southern ferry route, from Florida to Trinidad, Brazil, West Africa and Marrakesh, arriving at RAF Valley, Wales. The 34th Group arrived at its permanent station, RAF Mendlesham, England, in April 1944 and entered combat on 23 May 1944.

The squadron helped to prepare for Operation Overlord, the invasion of Normandy, by bombing airfields in France and Germany, and supported the June landings by attacking coastal defenses and communications. It supported ground forces at Saint-Lô in late July and struck V-1 flying bomb launch sites, gun emplacements, and supply lines throughout the summer of 1944.

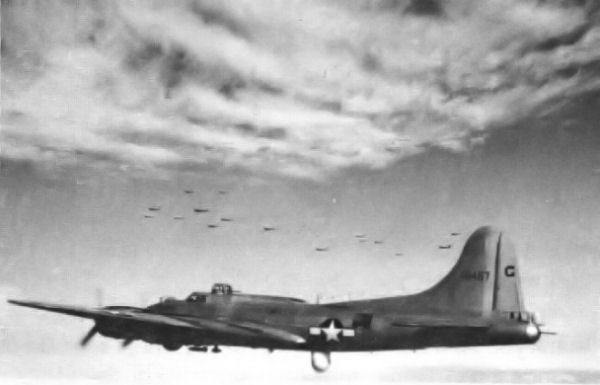
34th Bomb Group B-17G Flying Fortress (Note: The aircraft is Lockheed/Vega built Boeing B-17G-65-VE Serial 44-8457.)

The mixture of B-24s and B-17s in the 3d Bombardment Division presented a number of operational problems, and in early 1944 plans had begun at VIII Bomber Command headquarters to standardize the division with the Flying Fortress. The 34th group flew its last B-24 mission on 24 August 1944. It transferred its Liberators for overhaul and eventual transfer to units of the 2d Bombardment Division, and began converting to B-17s and flew its first mission with the new planes on 17 September 1944. The squadron engaged primarily in bombardment of strategic objectives from October 1944 to February 1945. Targets included marshaling yards in Ludwigshafen, Hamm, Osnabrück, and Darmstadt; oil centers in Bielefeld, Merseburg, Hamburg, and Misburg; factories in Berlin, Dalteln, and Hanover; and airfields in Münster, Neumünster, and Frankfurt.

During this period the squadron also supported ground forces during the Battle of the Bulge from December 1944 to January 1945. In March 1945, with few enemy industrial targets remaining and with Allied armies advancing across Germany, the 391st turned almost solely to interdicting enemy communications and supporting Allied ground forces. The 391st flew its last combat mission on 20 April 1945.

After V-E Day the squadron flew missions carrying food to flooded areas of the Netherlands and transported prisoners of war from German camps to Allied centers. The squadron redeployed to the United States in June and July 1945. The first elements of the air echelon departed 19 June 1945. The ground echelon sailed aboard the RMS Queen Elizabeth from Southampton on 6 August 1945. Upon arrival in the states, unit personnel were given 30 days leave. The squadron reassembled at Sioux Falls Army Air Field, South Dakota, where it was inactivated on 28 August 1945.

=== Air Refueling ===
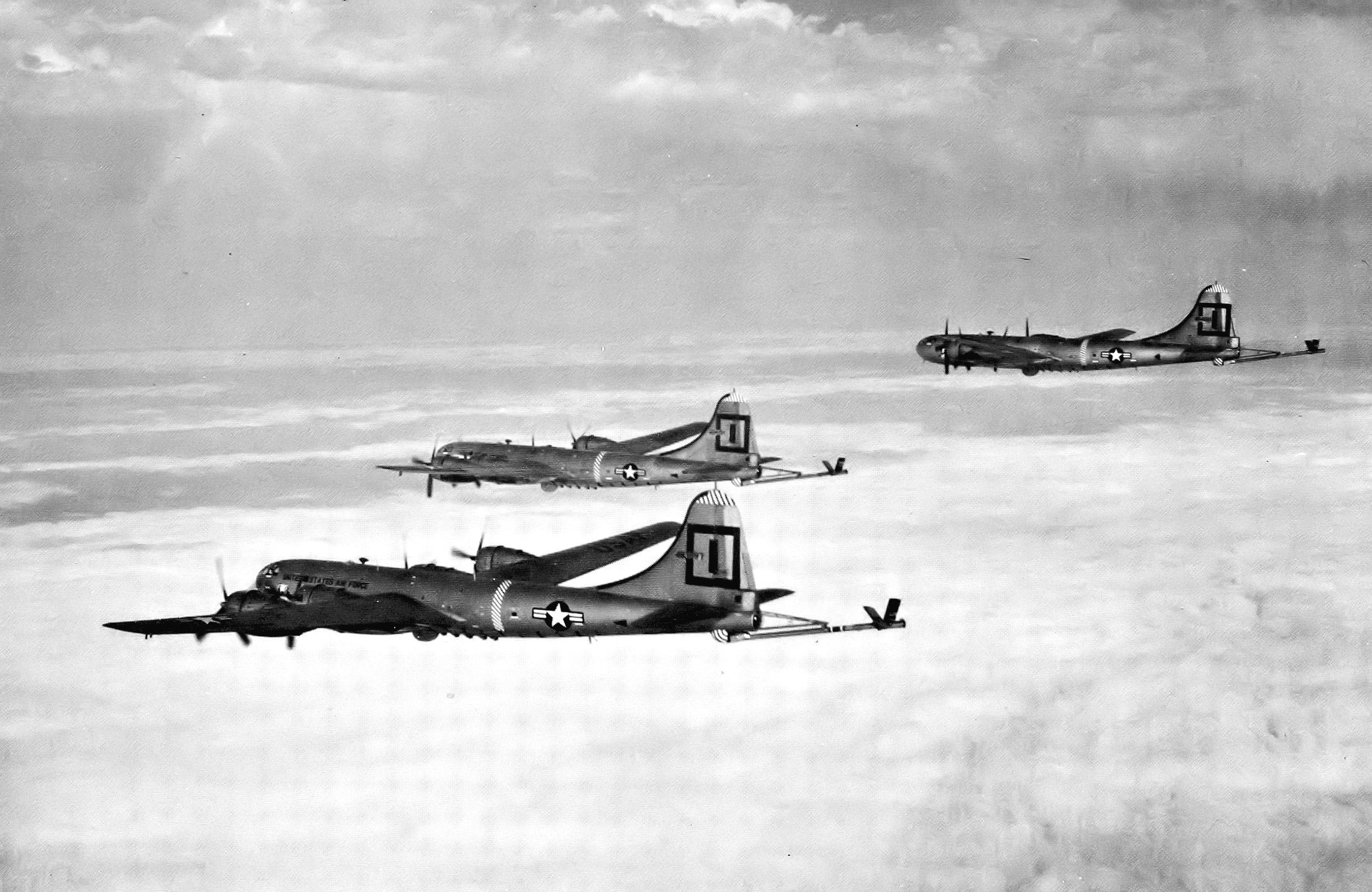
91st Air Refueling Squadron KB-29P Superfortress formation 1951

The 91st Air Refueling Squadron was activated at Barksdale Air Force Base as a Boeing KB-29 Superfortress air refueling squadron in April 1950. The squadron's parent 91st Strategic Reconnaissance Group was equipped with North American RB-45 Tornados. In the fall of 1950, the first air refueling of a jet bomber took place when a squadron Boeing KB-29P Superfortress refueled one of the group's Tornados. Over the next eighteen months, the 9lst developed equipment, techniques, and procedures for refueling jet bombers. The squadron performed the first night refueling and the first refueling performed in instrument weather conditions. However, Strategic Air Command (SAC) activated KB-29 squadrons faster than it acquired tankers, and the unit remained understrength through most of 1950 and 1951.

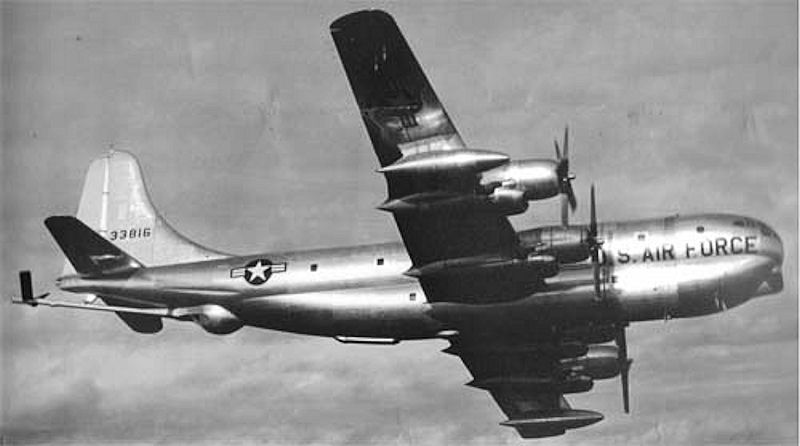
Boeing KC-97G Stratofreighter

After additional training with tankers, it moved to Lockbourne Air Force Base along with its parent 91st Strategic Reconnaissance Wing. It remained at Lockbourne until 1971 and began to fly worldwide air refueling operations. In 1953, the wing began to equip with Boeing RB-47 Stratojets and the squadron with Boeing KC-97 Stratofreighters. SAC had begun to include refueling in its war plans, and the squadron made frequent deployments with its KC-97s to forward locations, placing it ahead of the faster Boeing B-47 Stratojets it would refuel, and on their programmed route. During deployments with the wing, the squadron's aircraft also served as transports, carrying extra air crew, support personnel, and spare parts.

In 1957 the 91st wing was inactivated and the squadron was transferred to the 376th Bombardment Wing, which moved to Lockbourne from Barksdale in November. In 1963, the squadron began to transition to the all jet Boeing KC-135A Stratotanker. Once the transition to the new aircraft was complete, the squadron was attached to the 301st Bombardment Wing in May 1964, and was assigned when the wing became the 301st Air Refueling Wing, the first KC-135 wing in SAC. (Note: SAC had several refueling wings before 1964, but they were equipped with the KC-97. See, e.g. Ravenstein, pp. 271-273 (497th, 499th and 500th Air Refueling Wings and predecessor units).)

Crews and aircraft from the 91st deployed to Southeast Asia to refuel tactical aircraft and Boeing B-52 Stratofortresses involved in combat in Vietnam from January 1965 through December 1975. In July 1971, as regular Air Force operations at Lockbourne were substantially reduced, (Note: In addition to the reduction in size of the 301st Wing, the 317th Tactical Airlift Wing of Tactical Air Command moved from Lockbourne to Pope Air Force Base, North Carolina. Ravenstein, pp. 167-169.) the squadron moved to McConnell Air Force Base. It refueled aircraft participating in the Operation Urgent Fury, the Grenada rescue mission, between October and November 1983. The squadron was stationed at McConnell until it was inactivated in 1987.

In January 1988, SAC reactivated the 301st Air Refueling Wing and the 91st at Malmstrom Air Force Base, Montana with re-engined KC-135Rs. While at Malmstrom, it was reassigned several times as a result of the implementation of the Objective Wing organization in 1991 and the transfer of the refueling mission from SAC to Air Mobility Command in 1992. The squadron also supported U.S. operations during the 1991 Gulf War. It performed refuelings for bombers, airlift, and fighter aircraft as part of Tanker Task Forces around the world between 1992 and 1995. On 1 October 1996 the 91st relocated from Malmstrom to MacDill Air Force Base, Florida, where it became the air refueling component of the 6th Air Mobility Wing. Since 2002 the squadron has refueled fighter aircraft providing security for the southeastern United States.

== Lineage ==
391st Bombardment Squadron

- Constituted as the 1st Reconnaissance Squadron (Heavy) on 20 November 1940

Activated on 15 January 1941
Redesignated 391st Bombardment Squadron (Heavy) on 22 April 1942
Redesignated 391st Bombardment Squadron, Heavy on 20 August 1943
Inactivated on 28 August 1945
Consolidated with the 91st Air Refueling Squadron as the 91st Air Refueling Squadron on 19 September 1985

91st Air Refueling Squadron

- Constituted as the 91st Air Refueling Squadron, Medium on 1 March 1950

Activated on 16 April 1950
Redesignated 91st Air Refueling Squadron, Heavy on 1 January 1963
Consolidated with the 391st Bombardment Squadron on 19 September 1985
Inactivated on 1 October 1987
Activated on 5 January 1988
Redesignated 91st Air Refueling Squadron on 1 September 1991

=== Assignments ===
- General Headquarters Air Force (later Air Force Combat Command), 15 January 1941 (attached to 34th Bombardment Group)
- 1st Bomber Command, 5 September 1941 (remained attached to 34th Bombardment Group)
- II Bomber Command, c. 25 January 1942 (remained attached to 34th Bombardment Group)
- 34th Bombardment Group, 25 February 1942 – 28 August 1945
- 91st Strategic Reconnaissance Group, 16 April 1950 (attached to 91st Strategic Reconnaissance Wing after 10 February 1951)
- 91st Strategic Reconnaissance Wing, 28 May 1952 (attached to 5th Air Division, 12 January – 26 February 1954, Northeast Air Command, 6 October – 12 November 1954 and 10 July – October 1955
- 801st Air Division, 8 November 1957
- 376th Bombardment Wing, 1 December 1957 (attached to 301st Bombardment Wing after 4 May 1964)
- 301st Air Refueling Wing, 15 June 1964
- 47th Air Division, 1 July 1971
- 14th Air Division, 1 April 1972
- 12th Strategic Missile Division, 1 August 1972
- 384th Air Refueling Wing (later 384 Bombardment) Wing), 1 December 1972 – 1 October 1987
- 301st Air Refueling Wing, 5 January 1988
- 301st Operations Group, 1 September 1991
- 43d Operations Group, 1 June 1992
- 43d Air Refueling Group, 1 July 1994
- 6th Operations Group, 1 October 1996 – present

=== Stations ===
- Langley Field, Virginia, 15 January 1941
- Westover Field, Massachusetts, 29 May 1941
- Pendleton Field, Oregon, c. 25 January 1942
- Davis-Monthan Field, Arizona, c. 13 May 1942
- Geiger Field (later Geiger Army Air Base), Washington, 1 July 1942
- Ephrata Army Air Base, Washington, 1 December 1942
- Blythe Army Air Base, California, 11 December 1942 – 3 April 1944

Deployed at Salinas Army Air Base, California, 29 May – 13 July 1943

- RAF Mendlesham (AAF-156), England, 23 April 1944 – 24 July 1945
- Sioux Falls Army Air Field, South Dakota, 13 – 28 August 1945
- Barksdale Air Force Base, Louisiana, 16 April 1950
- Lockbourne Air Force Base, Ohio, 11 September 1951

Deployed at Nouasseur Air Base, French Morocco, 12 January – 26 February 1954
Deployed at Goose Air Base, Labrador, 6 October – 12 November 1954
Deployed at Ernest Harmon Air Force Base, Newfoundland, 10 July – October 1955

- McConnell Air Force Base, Kansas, 30 June 1971 – 1 October 1987
- Malmstrom Air Force Base, Montana, 5 January 1988
- MacDill Air Force Base, Florida, 1 October 1996 – present

=== Aircraft ===
- Stearman PT-17 Kaydet (1941)
- Douglas B-18 Bolo (1941–1942)
- Boeing B-17C Flying Fortress (1941–1943)
- Boeing B-17D Flying Fortress (1941–1943)
- Boeing B-17G Flying Fortress (1944–1945)
- Consolidated B-24 Liberator (1942–1943, 1944)
- Boeing KB-29P Superfortress (1950–1953)
- Boeing KC-97 Stratofreighter (1953–1963)
- Boeing KC-135A Stratotanker (1963–1987)
- Bell UH-1 Iroquois (1971–1972)
- Boeing KC-135R Stratotanker (1988–present)

=== Awards and campaigns ===
Award streamer	Award	Dates	Notes
	Air Force Outstanding Unit Award	8 September 1953 – 8 November 1957	91st Air Refueling Squadron
	Air Force Outstanding Unit Award	1 October 1966 – 1 April 1967	91st Air Refueling Squadron
	Air Force Outstanding Unit Award	1 July 1974 – 30 June 1976	91st Air Refueling Squadron
	Air Force Outstanding Unit Award	1 July 1976 – 30 June 1978	91st Air Refueling Squadron
	Air Force Outstanding Unit Award	1 July 1980 – 30 June 1981	91st Air Refueling Squadron
	Air Force Outstanding Unit Award	1 July 1988 – 30 June 1990	91st Air Refueling Squadron
	Air Force Outstanding Unit Award	1 July 1991 – 30 June 1993	91st Air Refueling Squadron
	Air Force Outstanding Unit Award	1 July 1994 – 30 June 1996	91st Air Refueling Squadron
	Air Force Outstanding Unit Award	1 July 1996 – 30 June 1998	91st Air Refueling Squadron
	Air Force Outstanding Unit Award	1 July 1998 – 30 June 2000	91st Air Refueling Squadron

Campaign Streamer	Campaign	Dates	Notes
	Antisubmarine	7 December 1941 – c. 13 May 1942	1st Reconnaissance Squadron
	Air Offensive, Europe	23 April 1944 – 5 June 1944	391st Bombardment Squadron
	Normandy	6 June 1944 – 24 July 1944	391st Bombardment Squadron
	Northern France	25 July 1944 – 14 September 1944	391st Bombardment Squadron
	Rhineland	15 September 1944 – 21 March 1945	391st Bombardment Squadron
	Central Europe	22 March 1944 – 21 May 1945	391st Bombardment Squadron
	Air Combat, EAME Theater	7 December 1941 – 11 May 1945	391st Bombardment Squadron

== See also ==
- List of United States Air Force air refueling squadrons
- B-17 Flying Fortress units of the United States Army Air Forces
- B-24 Liberator units of the United States Army Air Forces
- List of B-29 Superfortress operators
