= RAF Mendlesham =

Former Royal Air Force station in Suffolk, England

RAF Mendlesham USAAF Station 156
- Stowmarket, Suffolk in England
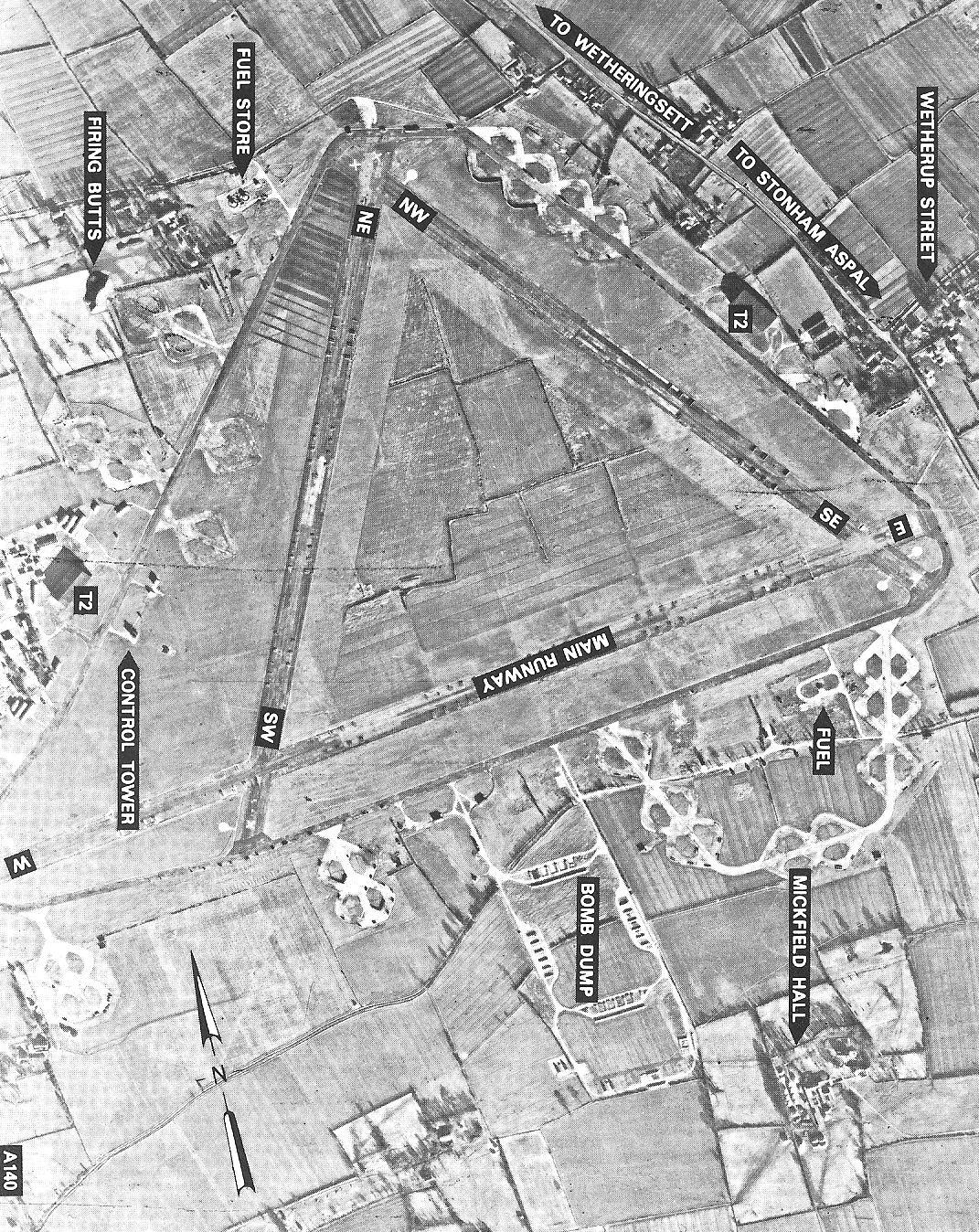
- Aerial photo of Mendlesham Airfield, 18 January 1947

Site information
- Type: Royal Air Force station
- Code: MZ
- Owner: Air Ministry
- Operator: Royal Air Force; United States Army Air Forces
- Controlled by: RAF Fighter Command 1943-44 * No. 12 Group RAF; Eighth Air Force; RAF Maintenance Command

Location
- Shown within Suffolk
- Coordinates: 52.233°N 1.118°E

Site history
- Built: 1943
- In use: December 1943 - June 1954
- Battles/wars: European theatre of World War II

Airfield information
- Elevation: 210 feet (64 m) AMSL
Runways
Direction	Length and surface
00/00	Concrete/Tarmac
00/00	Concrete/Tarmac
00/00	Concrete/Tarmac

Royal Air Force Mendlesham, or more simply RAF Mendlesham, is a former Royal Air Force station located 5.5 miles (8.9 km) north-east of Stowmarket, Suffolk, England.

== History ==
=== RAF Fighter Command use ===
Mendlesham airfield was built in 1943 and opened in late December of that year. Three RAF fighter squadrons manned by Czechoslovak pilots moved in as part of No. 134 (Czech) Airfield RAF - No. 310 flying Supermarine Spitfire LFIXs and No. 312 flying Spitfire LFIXbs on 19 February 1944. No. 313 flew in on 20 February with Spitfire IXs. No.310 finally moved out on 28 March 1944; Nos. 312 & 313 left on 4 April 1944.

=== USAAF use ===
In March 1944, Mendlesham was allocated to the United States Army Air Forces (USAAF) Eighth Air Force. It was assigned USAAF designation Station 156.

From 30 March 1944 though 11 July 1945, Mendlesham served as headquarters for the 93d Combat Bombardment Wing, 3d Bombardment Division, Eighth Air Force.

==== 34th Bombardment Group (Heavy) ====
The first USAAF tenant was the United States Army Air Forces Eighth Air Force 34th Bombardment Group (Heavy), arriving from Blythe AAF California. The 34th was assigned to the 93d Combat Bombardment Wing, and the group tail code was a "Square-S". Its operational squadrons were:

- 4th Bombardment Squadron (Q6)
- 7th Bombardment Squadron (R2)
- 18th Bombardment Squadron (8I)
- 391st Bombardment Squadron (3L)

The group flew both Boeing B-17 Flying Fortresses and Consolidated B-24 Liberators as part of the Eighth Air Force's strategic bombing campaign.

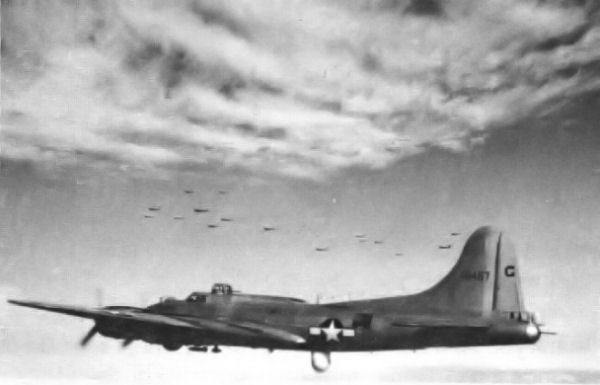
34th Bomb Group Lockheed/Vega B-17G-65-VE Fortress Serial 44-8457

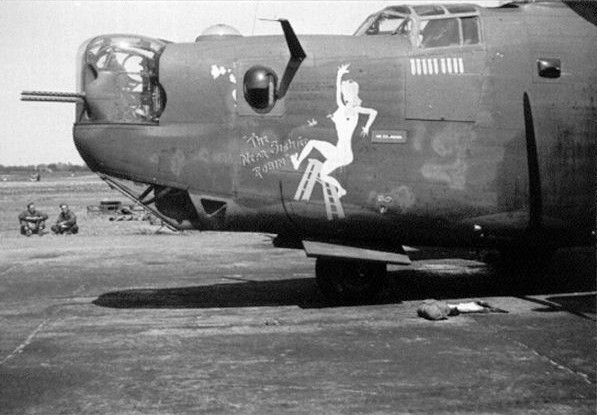
Douglas-Tulsa B-24H-15-DT Liberator Serial 41-28851 of the 7th Bomb Squadron. This aircraft was damaged during a mission on 24 August 1944 and made an emergency landing in Sweden (MACR 8461). The aircraft was interned until the end of the war then repaired and flown back to the UK in 1945.

The 34th flew 170 operations from the station, the first sixty-two while flying B-24 Liberators and the remainder with B-17G Fortresses. The change-over was made during the summer of 1944 when, in common with other groups assigned to the 93rd Combat Wing, the 3rd Division standardized on the Fortress. The group helped to prepare for the invasion of Normandy by bombing airfields in France and Germany, and supported the landing in June by attacking coastal defenses and communications. Continued to take part in the campaign in France by supporting ground forces at Saint-Lô, 24–25 July, and by striking V-weapon sites, gun emplacements, and supply lines throughout the summer of 1944.

The group converted to B-17s in September 1944 and engaged primarily in the bombardment of strategic objectives from October 1944 to February 1945. Targets included marshalling yards in Ludwigshafen, Hamm, Osnabrück, and Darmstadt; oil centers in Bielefeld, Merseburg, Hamburg, and Misburg; factories in Berlin, Dalteln, and Hanover; and airfields in Münster, Neumünster, and Frankfurt. During this period the group also supported ground forces during the Battle of the Bulge, December 1944-January 1945. In March 1945, with few industrial targets remaining and with Allied armies advancing across Germany, the 34th turned almost solely to interdicting enemy communications and supporting Allied ground forces.

Before V-E Day, it carried food to flooded areas of the Netherlands (Operation Chowhound), and after V-E Day transported prisoners of war from German camps to Allied centers. The 34th Bomb Group returned to Sioux Falls AAF, South Dakota on 28 August 1945 and was inactivated.

=== RAF Maintenance Command use ===
After the war, the field was used as the sub-site of No. 94 Maintenance Unit RAF being used as an ammunition storage depot. It was reduced to inactive status in June 1954 and sold.

== Current use ==
With the end of military control the former technical site of Mendlesham, which was to the southwest of the airfield was developed into an industrial estate. Large, expansive buildings were constructed over the area, around the T2 hangar that still exists. The balance of the airfield was returned to agricultural use; the runways, hardstands and perimeter track were largely removed for aggregate and today are fields, although parts of the perimeter track and the 02/20 runway remain as single-track farm access roads. No evidence of the wartime control tower remains. The NE end of the 20 runway has a small portion remaining at full width. A few wartime buildings are in use by farmers. Only the faintest hint of a perimeter track remains visible. A small but impressive memorial bronze plaque, subscribed to by the men of the 34th Group before their departure and erected in 1949 on the old airfield next to the A140 road, was stolen in April 2010 and presumably melted down for scrap. In January 2014 an appeal was made to raise £35,000 to replace it in the more secure location of St Mary's Church in Mendlesham.

Some aerospace-related use still remains though: one portion of runway 08/25, although now covered with grass, is now in use by local microlight pilots and by Suffolk Coastal Floaters hang-gliding club along with a blister-type hangar at the EOR.

== See also ==
- List of former Royal Air Force stations
