= Ephrata Municipal Airport =

Airport in Washington, United States

Ephrata Municipal Airport Ephrata Army Airfield
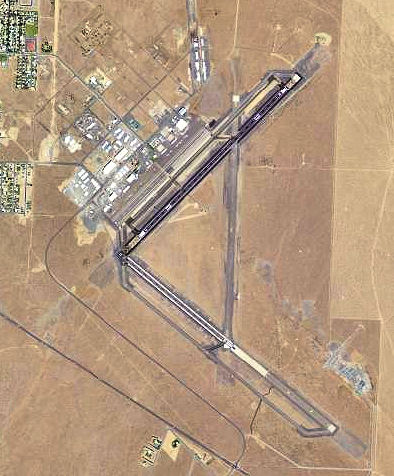
- USGS 2006 orthophoto
- IATA: EPH; ICAO: KEPH; FAA LID: EPH

Summary
- Airport type: Public
- Operator: Port District No. 9 of Grant County
- Serves: Ephrata, Washington
- Elevation AMSL: 1,276 ft (389 m)
- Coordinates: 47°18′29″N 119°31′01″W
- Website: PortOfEphrata.gov

Map
- Location of airport in Washington EPH (the United States)

Runways
Direction	Length		Surface
Direction	ft	m	Surface
3/21	5,500	1,676	Asphalt
4/22	3,467	1,057	Asphalt
11/29	3,843	1,171	Asphalt

Statistics (2010)
- Aircraft operations: 135,140
- Based aircraft: 72
- Source: Federal Aviation Administration

Ephrata Municipal Airport (IATA: EPH, ICAO: KEPH, FAA LID: EPH) is a public use airport located 4 km (2.5 mi) southeast of the central business district of Ephrata, a city in Grant County, Washington, United States. It is included in the National Plan of Integrated Airport Systems for 2011–2015, which categorized it as a general aviation airport.

== History ==
The airfield was established in 1939 as Ephrata Army Air Base. It was used initially as a support airfield for bombing and gunnery ranges in the area (Seven Mile Gunnery School). Transferred to Fourth Air Force in 1940 as a group training airfield for B-17 Flying Fortress heavy bombardment units (including the 401st Bombardment Group), with new aircraft being obtained from Boeing near Seattle. Later it was reassigned to Second Air Force when heavy bombardment group training was reassigned to that command. It was also used by Air Technical Service Command as an aircraft maintenance and supply depot. On 25 September 1945, Major General Willis H. Hale, Fourth Air Force, notified Ephrata Army Air Base that it was temporarily deactivated, and it was turned over to War Assets Administration (WAA) for disposal. It was transferred to Grant County and developed into a commercial airport in the late 1940s.

Empire Air Lines then began commercial service to Spokane and Yakima, Washington. Empire was merged into West Coast Airlines in 1952. West Coast continued serving the airport and was merged into Air West in 1968 which was renamed to Hughes Airwest in 1970. All service ended in 1974 and was briefly replaced by Cascade Airways before all commercial service was moved to the Grant County International Airport in Moses Lake, Washington in 1975.

Parts of the 1989 Steven Spielberg film Always were filmed on the airport.

== Facilities and aircraft ==
Ephrata Municipal Airport covers an area of 2,300 acres (931 ha) at an elevation of 1,276 feet (389 m) above mean sea level. It has three asphalt paved runways: 3/21 is 5,500 by 75 feet (1,676 x 23 m); 4/22 is 3,467 by 150 feet (1,057 x 46 m); 11/29 is 3,843 by 60 feet (1,171 x 18 m).

For the 12-month period ending June 28, 2010, the airport had 135,140 general aviation aircraft operations, an average of 370 per day. At that time there were 72 aircraft based at this airport: 24% single-engine, 7% multi-engine, and 69% glider.

== Cargo Carriers ==
Airlines	Destinations
Ameriflight	Portland (OR), Seattle-Boeing

== See also ==
- List of airports in Washington
- Washington World War II Army Airfields
