= Bien Hoa Air Base =

Vietnam Air Defence - Air Force military airfield

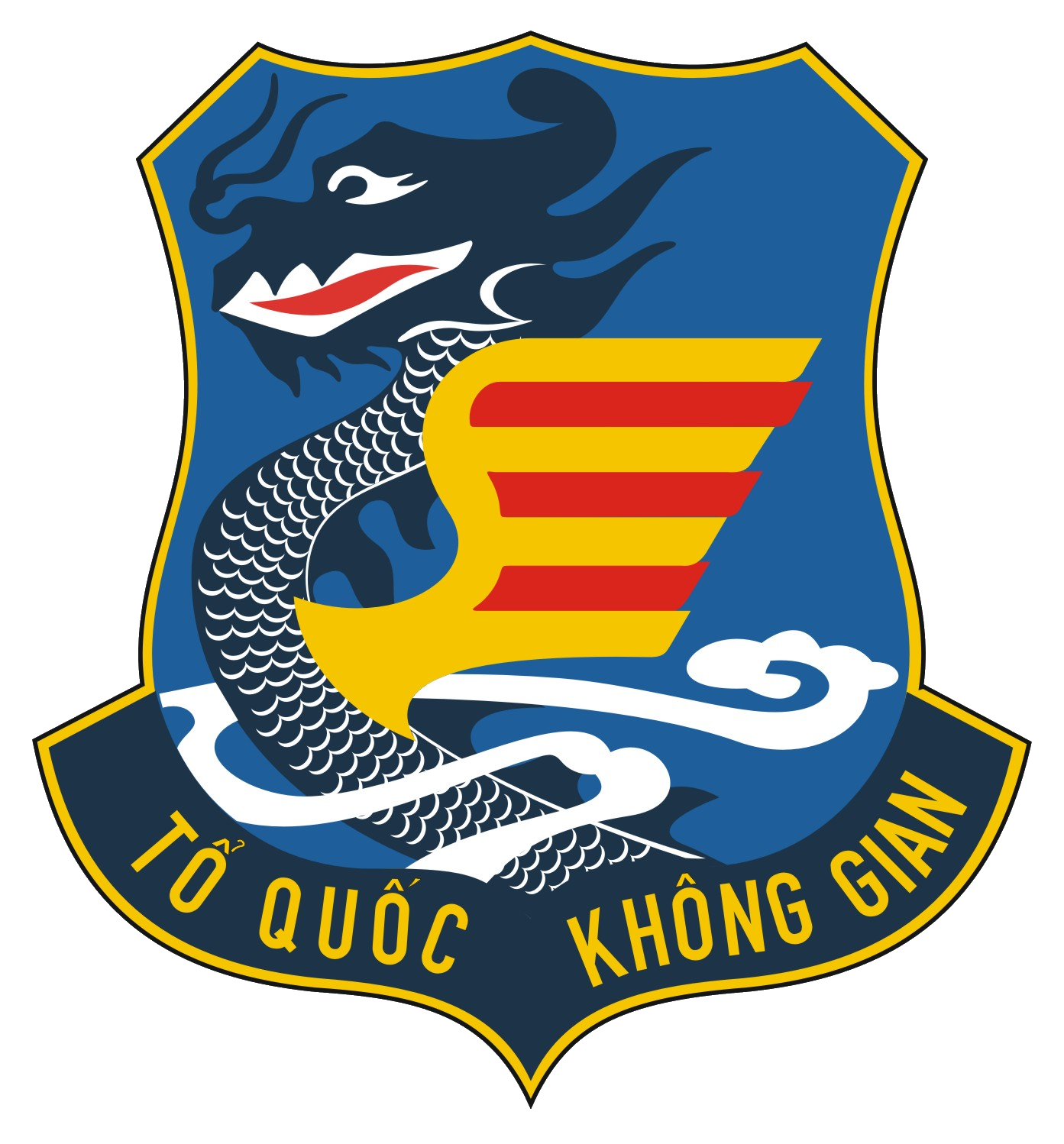
Bien Hoa Air Base
- Biên Hoà Airport Cảng hàng không Biên Hoà Sân Bay Biên Hoà
- Biên Hòa, Đồng Nai Province in Vietnam
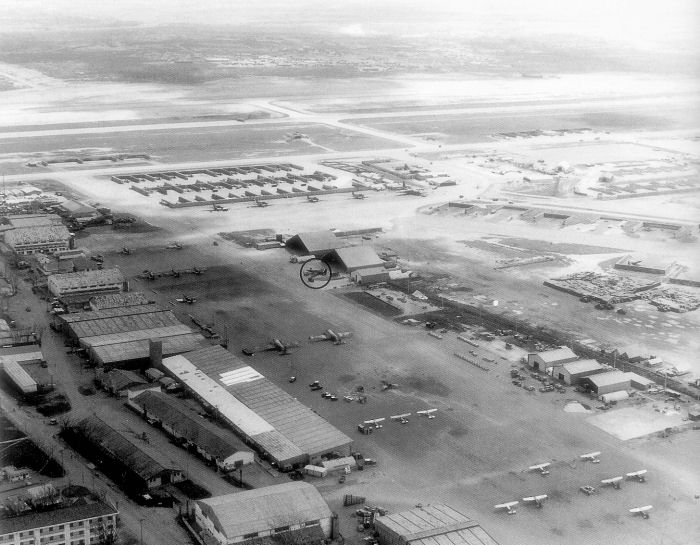
- Bien Hoa Air Base in July 1968

Site information
- Type: Air Force Base, Public, Military
- Operator: Vietnam Air Defence - Air Force Republic of Vietnam Air Force United States Air Force - Pacific Air Forces (USAF)
- Condition: Seized 1975 by PAVN, in use as military airfield

Location
- Shown within Vietnam
- Coordinates: 10°58′37″N 106°49′06″E

Site history
- Built: 1955
- In use: 1955-
- Battles/wars: Vietnam War

Airfield information
- Identifiers: IATA: VBH, ICAO: VVBH
- Elevation: 79 feet (24 m) AMSL
Runways
Direction	Length and surface
09L/27R	10,000 feet (3,048 m) Concrete
09R/27L	10,000 feet (3,048 m) Concrete

Bien Hoa Air Base (Vietnamese: Sân bay Biên Hòa) is a Vietnam Air Defence - Air Force (VN ADAF) military airfield located in South-Central southern Vietnam about 25 km (16 miles) from Ho Chi Minh City, across the Dong Nai river in the northern ward of Tân Phong, and within the city of Biên Hòa within Đồng Nai Province. The boomburb city is densely populated and rings the base, despite significant levels of Agent Orange toxins simply left there for decades. Cleanup and remediation began in 2019.

During the Vietnam War the base was used by the Republic of Vietnam Air Force (RVNAF). The United States used it as a major base from 1961 through 1973, stationing Army, Air Force, Navy and Marine units there.

== Origins ==
Bien Hoa is located on flat grounds in a rural area 25 km (16 miles) northeast of Saigon. The French Air Force established an air base, the Base aérienne tactique 192, which was very active during the First Indochina War.

In February 1953 the French Air Force established a facility at Bien Hoa to overhaul its F8F Bearcats. In April 15 airmen and USAF civilians from the 6410th Materiel Control Group arrived in Saigon to help the French set up their F8F overhaul facility and they were deployed to Bien Hoa.

On 1 June 1955, Bien Hoa Air Base became the RVNAF's logistics support base when the French evacuated their main depot at Hanoi. At this time the base had a single 5,700-foot (1,700 m) by 150-foot (46 m) PSP runway.

In December 1960, the U.S. Military Assistance Advisory Group Vietnam (MAAG) requested the U.S. Navy, as the designated contract construction agent for the Department of Defense in Southeast Asia, to plan and construct several jet-capable airfields in South Vietnam, including at Bien Hoa. In December 1961, the American construction company RMK-BRJ was directed by the Navy's Officer in Charge of Construction RVN to begin construction of a new concrete runway, the first of many projects built by RMK-BRJ at the Bien Hoa Air Base over the following ten years.

== American use during the Vietnam War ==
With the influx of USAF tactical air units in the early 1960s, Bien Hoa became a joint operating base for both the RVNAF and USAF. The USAF forces stationed there were under the command of the Pacific Air Forces (PACAF).

Bien Hoa was the location for TACAN station Channel 73 and was referenced by that identifier in voice communications during air missions. Its military mail address was APO San Francisco, 96227.

From September 1962 the 33rd Transportation Company (Light Helicopter) arrived with Piasecki CH-21C Shawnee's.

A Company, 501st Aviation Battalion arrived during December 1964 with Bell UH-1 Hueys.

=== Det. 2 4400th Combat Crew Training Squadron/1st Air Commando Squadron (Composite) ===
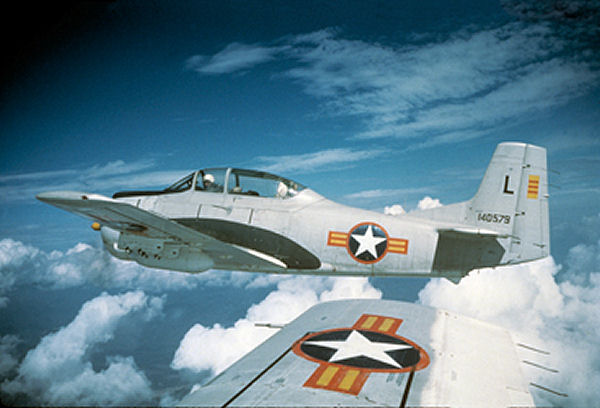
4400th CCTS North American T-28D-NA Trojan Serial 51-3579 wearing South Vietnamese markings flies over Vietnam

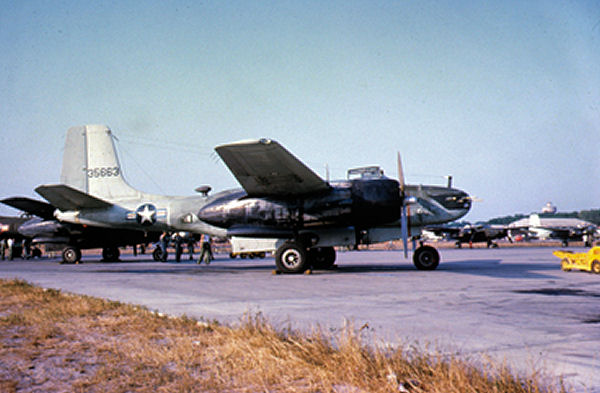
USAF Douglas A-26C/B-26B-45-DT Invader Serial 44-35663 on the flightine of Bien Hoa Air Base, 1963

On 11 October 1961, President John F. Kennedy directed, in NSAM 104, that the Defense Secretary "introduce the Air Force 'Jungle Jim' Squadron into Vietnam for the initial purpose of training Vietnamese forces." The 4400th Combat Crew Training Squadron was to proceed as a training mission and not for combat. The unit would be officially titled Detachment 2 of the 4400th Combat Crew Training Squadron, code named Farm Gate. The unit would administratively and operationally belong to the Air Force section of MAAG Vietnam. Detachment 2A would be the B-26 Invader unit; Detachment 2B would be the T-28 Trojan unit.

In late October an advance party from the 6009th Tactical Support Group arrived at Bien Hoa to prepare the base for Farm Gate operations and on 15 November they were joined by Detachment 9, 6010th Tactical Support Group responsible for aircraft maintenance. In late December 4 B-26s arrived at Bien Hoa and began operations. Farm Gate would quickly grow to 4 SC-47s, 4 B-26s and 8 T-28s.

In June 1962 2 Army of the Republic of Vietnam (ARVN) soldiers guarding the base perimeter were killed by Viet Cong (VC) and as a result CINCPAC Admiral Harry D. Felt recommended the defoliation of the jungle area north of the base; this was carried out by RVNAF H-34 helicopters in July.

In May 1962 2 RB-26C night photo-reconnaissance aircraft joined the Farm Gate planes at the base. One of the aircraft was destroyed in a ground accident on 20 October.

In July 1963 the 19th Tactical Air Support Squadron was activated at the base, becoming operational on 15 September. Initially equipped with 4 O-1 Bird Dogs and 20 crew. It was tasked with training RVNAF pilots and observers in forward air control and visual reconnaissance. By the end of 1963 it had 16 O-1s at Bien Hoa and had flown 3862 sorties.

By June 1963, the USAF presence in South Vietnam had grown to almost 5,000 airmen. As the buildup continued, USAF directed the activation of a more permanent organizational structure to properly administer the forces being deployed. On 8 July 1963 the Farm Gate squadrons at Bien Hoa were redesignated the 1st Air Commando Squadron (Composite) comprising two strike sections, one of 10 B-26s and 2 RB-26s and the other of 13 T-28s, in addition support squadrons operated 6 C-47s and 4 psychological warfare U-10s.

Also on 8 July the 34th Tactical Group was established at the base, taking control of the 19th Tactical Air Support Squadron and the 34th Air Base Squadron.

In December 1963 U-2 reconnaissance aircraft operating from the base conducted surveillance missions over Laos and North Vietnam.

In early 1964 the USAF and RVNAF were only able to provide half of all requested air support. On 11 February a B-26 operating from Eglin Air Force Base lost a wing in flight and this led to the grounding of all B-26s in South Vietnam. With the loss of the B-26s CINCPAC and Military Assistance Command, Vietnam (MACV) proposed that they be replaced by B-57B Canberra tactical bombers operating under Farm Gate procedures with RVNAF markings and joint USAF/RVNAF crews. At the end of March 48 B-57s flew from Yokota Air Base in Japan to Clark Air Base in the Philippines. On 8 April the remaining B-26s at Bien Hoa flew to Clark Air Base for scrapping.

On 24 March a T-28 lost a wing during a bombing run near Sóc Trăng Airfield killing both crewmen and on 9 April another T-28 lost a wing during a strafing run and crashed. Two officials from North American Aviation, the manufacturers of the T-28, visited Bien Hoa and reviewed these losses and advised that the T-28 wasn't designed for the stresses it was being subjected to as a close air support aircraft. As a result, 5 older T-28s were retired and 9 newer aircraft were borrowed by the RVNAF and operational restrictions imposed. Despite this augmentation, accidents and aircraft transfers meant that by late May the 1st Air Commando Squadron had only 8 T-28s left but these were retired on 30 May and replaced by more capable A-1E Skyraiders.

=== B-57 Canberras ===
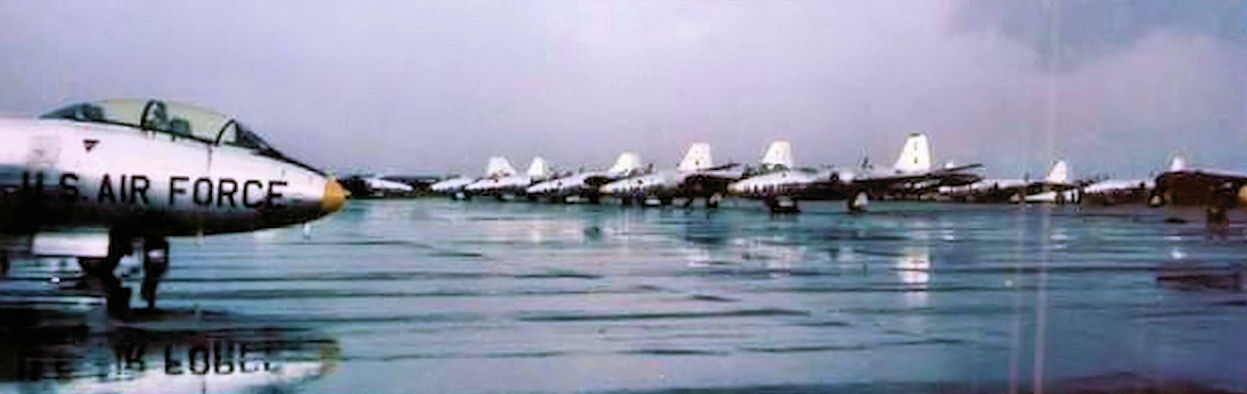
Martin B-57B bombers at Bien Hoa Air Base South Vietnam August 1964. Photo shows the aircraft shortly after their arrival, in natural aluminum and unpainted. Aircraft also show their In-squadron identification letters

Following the Gulf of Tonkin incident on 4 August 1964, the Joint Chiefs of Staff began a buildup of U.S. airpower in South Vietnam and 36 B-57B Canberras of the 8th and 13th Bombardment Squadrons at Clark Air Base were ordered to Bien Hoa. As the B-57s approached Bien Hoa on the evening of 5 August one crashed on approach and two skidded on the rain-soaked runway colliding with each other and blocking the runway forcing the rest of the flight to divert to Tan Son Nhut Air Base. One of the B-57Bs was hit by ground fire and dived into the ground during approach at Tan Son Nhut and was destroyed, killing both crew members. Ground rescue parties were unable to reach the planes due to strong Viet Cong fire.

The deployment of the B-57s would be the first deployment of jet combat aircraft to Vietnam. This was a violation of the Geneva Protocols which forbade the introduction of jet combat aircraft to Vietnam; the squadrons were ostensibly assigned to the 405th Fighter Wing at Clark Air Base and carried out rotational deployments to South Vietnam on a 'temporary' basis.

During the next few weeks, more B-57Bs were moved from Clark to Bien Hoa to make good the losses of 5 August and to reinforce the original deployment. The B-57s shared an open-air, three-sided hangar with the RVNAF resulting in overcrowding that forced 18 of the B-57s to be sent back to Clark in October.

In late August Detachment 1, Pacific Air Rescue Service was established at the base equipped with HH-43Bs. In October Detachment 4 was established at the base equipped with 3 improved HH-43Fs and in November Detachment 1 was sent to Takhli Royal Thai Air Force Base. The HH-43s were responsible for search and rescue, local base rescue and firefighting. With the activation of the 38th Air Rescue Squadron on 30 June 1965 the detachment at Bien Hoa was renamed Detachment 6.

In October 1964 the 602nd Fighter Squadron (Commando) was organised at the base equipped with A-1Es.

=== 1964 Mortar attack ===
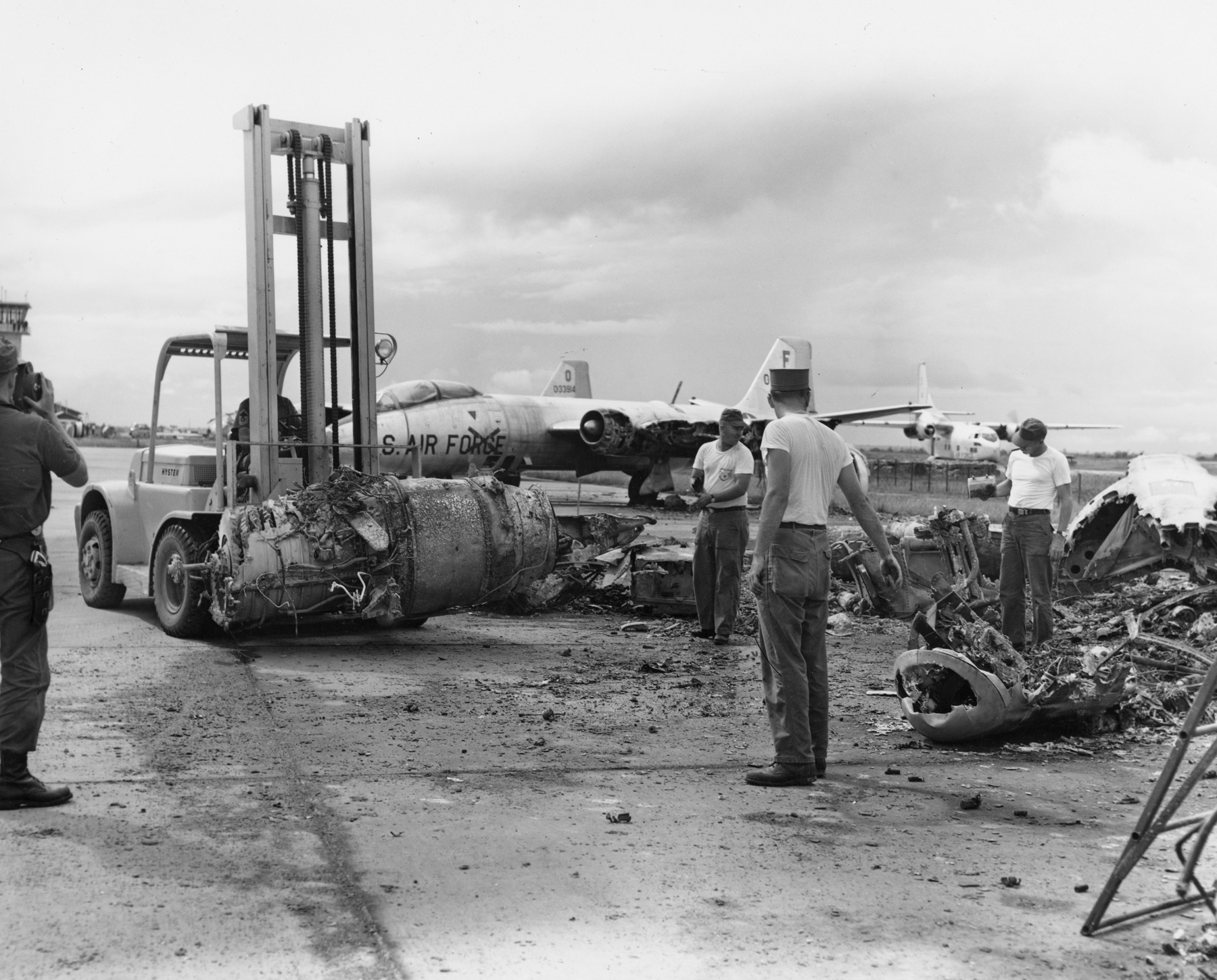
Clearing wreckage of B-57 after the mortar attack

On the night of 1 November 1964 a VC mortar team penetrated the base perimeter and launched a 30-minute barrage on the base destroying five B-57s, three A-1Hs and one HH-43 and damaging 13 B-57s, three A-1Hs, three HH-43s and two C-47s and killing four U.S. and two Vietnamese. The VC claimed to have destroyed 59 aircraft and killed hundreds of U.S. personnel. The Joint Chiefs of Staff recommended reprisal attacks against the North Vietnamese but President Lyndon Johnson ordered the replacement of the lost aircraft and convened a National Security Council working group to consider available political and military options. On 6 November the RVNAF led by Air Vice Marshal Nguyễn Cao Kỳ launched a 32 aircraft retaliatory attack against a VC base area, claiming to have killed 500 VC.

On 2 December 1964 the equipment for the conversion of two 1st Air Commando Squadron C-47s into FC-47 gunships arrived at Bien Hoa. The first FC-47 was ready for testing on 11 December and the second on 15 December. The FC-47s began daytime patrols on 15 December with their first engagement on 21 December killing 21 VC. The first night mission took place on the night of 23/4 December.

On 19 February 1965 the Bien Hoa-based B-57Bs mission conducted the USAF's first combat mission bombing VC bases in Phước Tuy Province, in contrast to the preceding Farm Gate missions which were ostensibly conducted by the RVNAF, though in reality carried out by the USAF). This strike was, incidentally, the first time that live ordnance had been delivered against an enemy in combat from a USAF jet bomber. The B-57s conducted further strikes from 21 to 24 February and on 24 February USAF units rescued an ARVN unit under attack in the Mang Yang Pass. On 9 March 1965 the Joint Chiefs of Staff formally approved the use of USAF aircraft for offensive operations in South Vietnam, ending the advisory era.

=== 1965 Arrival of 173rd Airborne Brigade, 1st Royal Australian Regiment, 161 Battery Royal New Zealand Artillery ===
From 3 to 6 May 1965 USAF transport aircraft deployed the 173rd Airborne Brigade from Okinawa to Bien Hoa to secure the airbase and surrounding areas and the port of Vũng Tàu. The 173rd was the first major ground combat unit of the United States Army to serve in the country. The 173rs established their base on the northeast perimeter of the air base. Also joining them in June and July were an Australian Infantry Regiment and a New Zealand Artillery Battery. Both served under the 173rd. The New Zealand battery was attached as the third battery of the U.S. 3rd Battalion, 319th Field Artillery Regiment. Australian and New Zealand forces remained under U.S. command until June 1966 when they were given their own tactical area of responsibility (TAOR) at Nui Dat in Phước Tuy Province. This became the 1st Australian Task Force.

=== 1965 Bien Hoa Disaster ===
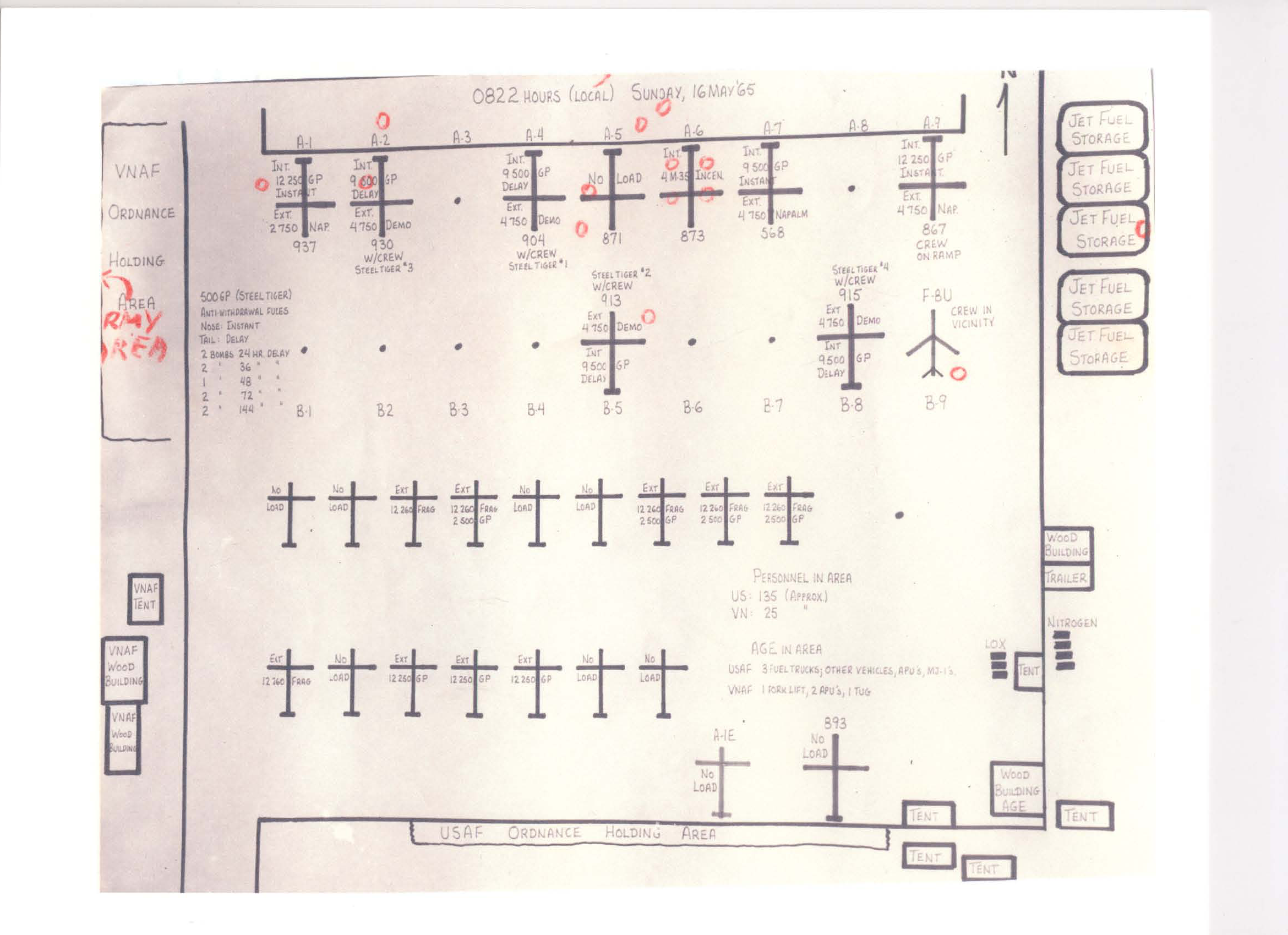
A diagram of where the aircraft were located by tail number and ordnance loaded. The red circles represent the spot where a deceased person was located.

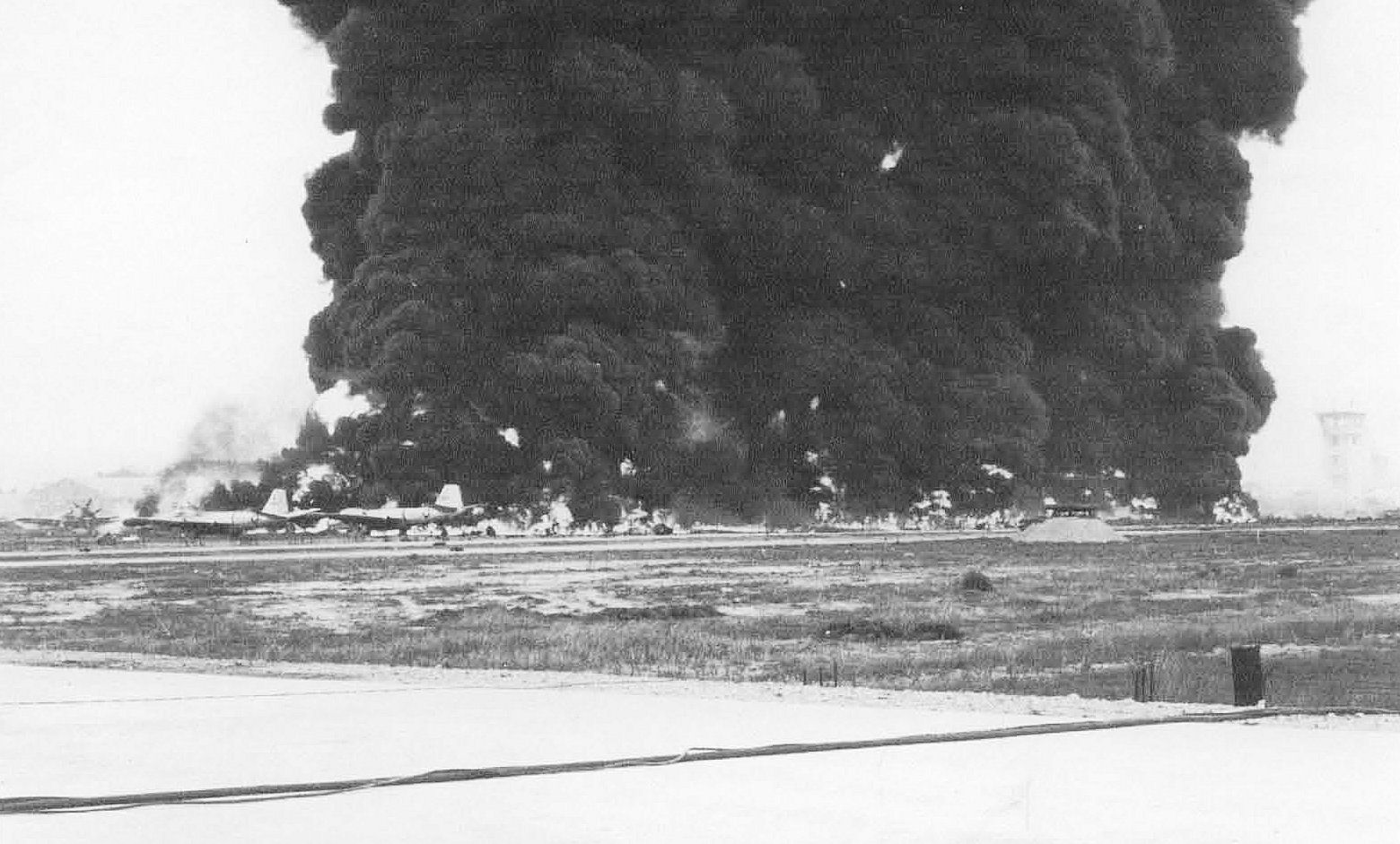
Burning aircraft on ramp at Bien Hoa Air Base after explosion

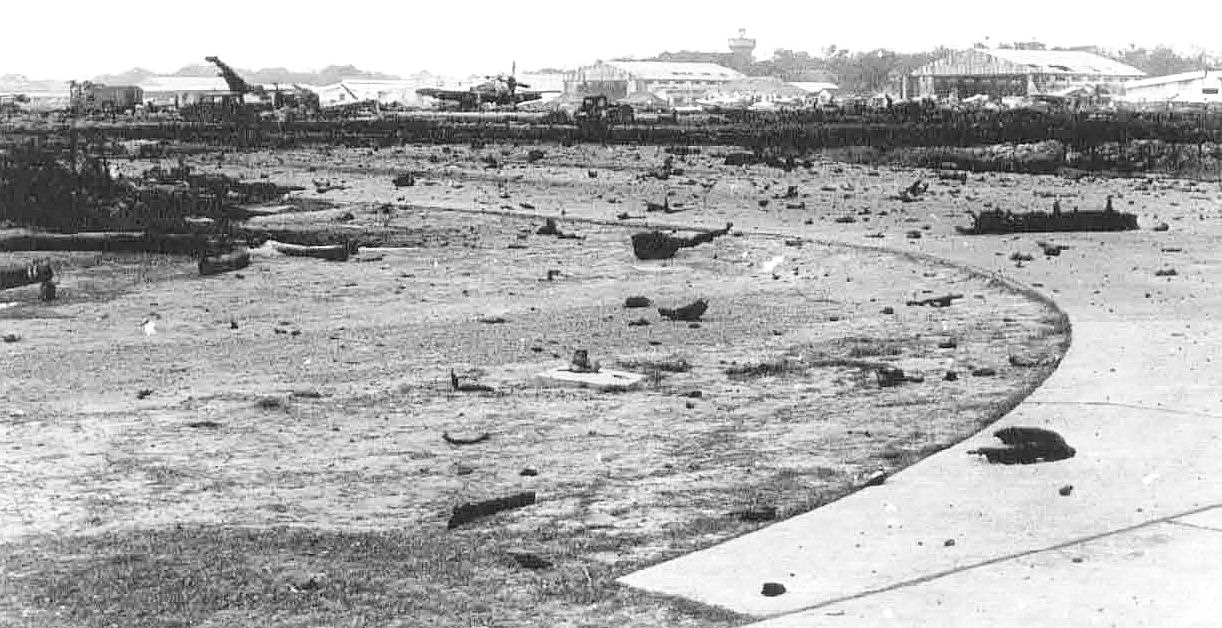
Wreckage on parking apron after explosion and fire

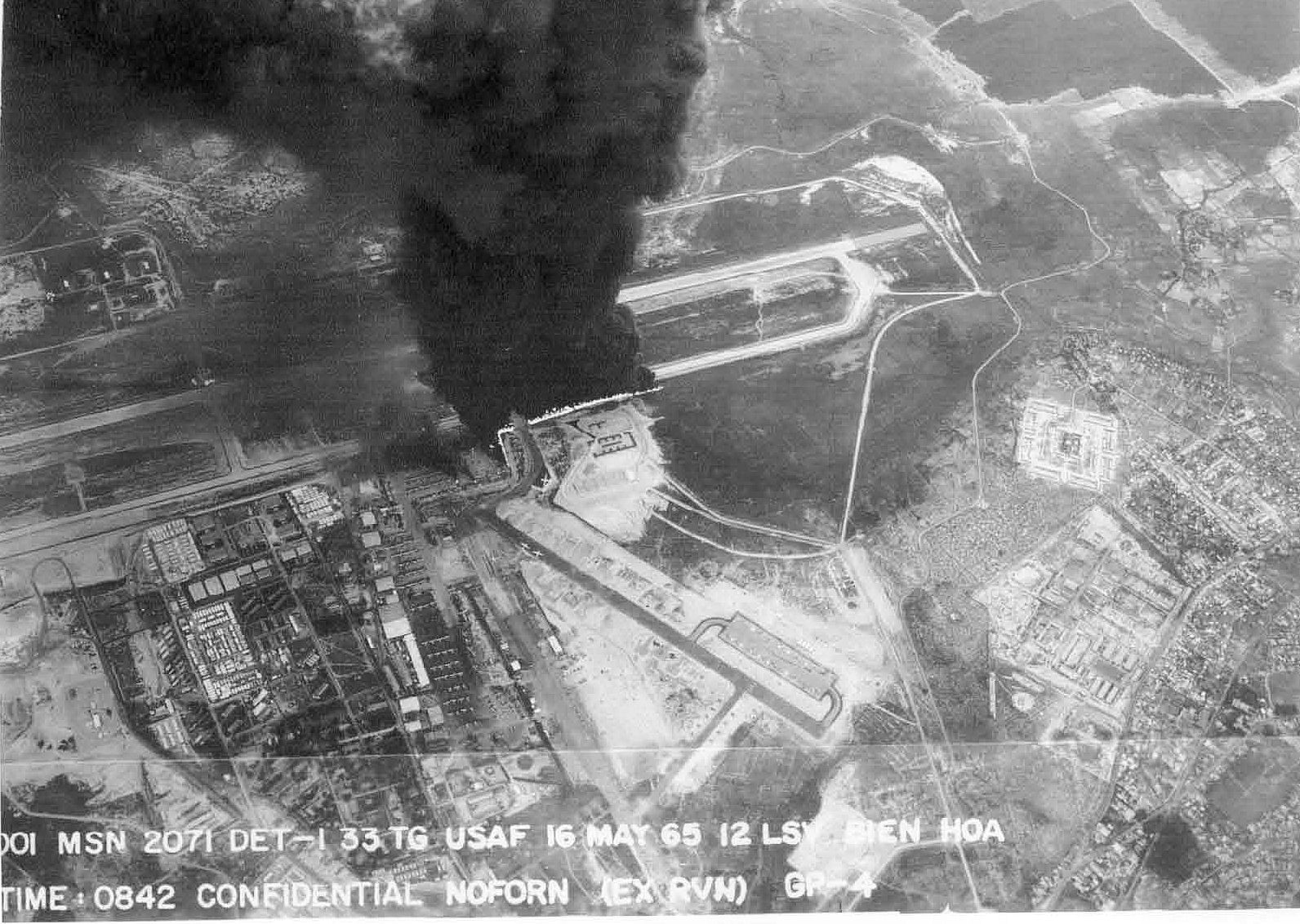
Aerial view of fire

The use of the B-57s in combat continued to increase as the VC stepped up their attacks on ARVN outposts throughout South Vietnam and the jets were also used on Operation Barrel Roll missions over Laos. On the morning of 16 May 1965, four loaded B-57s were awaiting takeoff at the base for a Barrel Roll mission, when a U.S. Navy F-8 Crusader made an emergency landing and was being inspected on the ramp. The lead B-57 suddenly exploded and burst into flames causing a chain reaction of explosions destroying other aircraft, fuel and pre-armed ordnance. The explosions destroyed 10 B-57s, two A-1Es and the Navy F-8, killed 28 Americans and six Vietnamese and wounded more than 100 more and damaged 25 RVNAF A-1s in what was described as one of the "worst disasters in Air Force history". Among the dead was 34-year-old USAF Major Robert G. Bell, who in 1959 had been one of the 32 finalists for NASA Astronaut Group 1.

The Bien Hoa Air Base Vietnam May 16, 1965 Conflagration/Fire Accident Investigation Board concluded that the disaster was caused by the accidental explosion of a bomb on a parked B-57 triggering a series of blasts. The aircraft and the ammunition were stored too close together which allowed the fires and explosions to spread. The accident investigation board recommended improvements. In the face of such experience, engineers initiated a major program to construct revetments and aircraft shelters to protect individual aircraft.

The 10 surviving B-57s were transferred to Tan Son Nhut Air Base and continued to fly sorties on a reduced scale until replacement aircraft arrived from Clark AB. As the B-57B was withdrawn from active front-line service, some B-57Bs had to be transferred to Vietnam from the Kansas Air National Guard, and 12 B-57Es had to be withdrawn from target-towing duties and reconfigured as bombers to make good these losses. In June 1965, the B-57s were moved from Tan Son Nhut Air Base to Da Nang Air Base.

On 23 June the 416th Tactical Fighter Squadron equipped with F-100D Super Sabres moved from Da Nang Air Base to Bien Hoa. On 13 July 1965 the newly arrived 307th Tactical Fighter Squadron also equipped with F-100Ds arrived at the base.

=== 3rd Tactical Fighter Wing ===
On 8 November 1965 the 3d Tactical Fighter Wing moved to Bien Hoa, becoming the host unit at the base.

The 3rd TFW briefly absorbed the assets of the 1st and 602nd Air Commando Squadrons, however in January 1966 the 1st Air Commando Squadron moved to Pleiku Air Base and the 602nd Air Commando Squadron moved to Nha Trang Air Base. On 8 February 1966 the 90th Tactical Fighter Squadron equipped with F-100Ds arrived at Bien Hoa.

F-100 units attached to the 3rd TFW were:

- 90th Tactical Fighter Squadron, 8 February 1966 - 31 October 1970
- 307th Tactical Fighter Squadron, 21 November - 6 December 1965
- 308th Tactical Fighter Squadron, 2 December 1965 – 25 December 1966
- 416th Tactical Fighter Squadron, 16 November 1965 - 15 April 1967
- 429th Tactical Fighter Squadron, 21 November - 14 December 1965
- 510th Tactical Fighter Squadron, 8 November 1965 – 15 November 1969
- 531st Tactical Fighter Squadron, 7 December 1965 – 31 July 1970

Other attached units were:

- 1st Air Commando Squadron, 21 November- 8 March 1966
- 8th Attack Squadron (later redesignated 8th Special Operations Squadron), 15 November 1969 - 30 September 1970
- 10th Fighter Squadron (Commando), 8 April 1966 - 17 April 1967
- 311th Attack Squadron, 15 November - 15 December 1969
- 602nd Air Commando Squadron, 21 November- 8 March 1966
- 604th Air Commando Squadron, 15 November 1967 - 1 March 1970

In addition AC-47 Spooky gunships of Flight D, 4th Air Commando Squadron were deployed to Bien Hoa. These would later be replaced by Flight C of the 14th Air Commando Squadron with 4 AC-47s.

==== F-5 Skoshi Tiger evaluation ====
In late October 1965, 12 F-5A Freedom Fighters belonging to the 4503rd Tactical Fighter Squadron arrived at Bien Hoa for combat evaluation under a program known as Skoshi Tiger. The planes mostly flew close air support missions near Bien Hoa flying 1500 sorties by the end of December and losing one aircraft to ground fire. On 1 January 1966 the squadron moved north to Da Nang Air Base. The squadron moved back to Bien Hoa in early February and then returned to Da Nang on 20 February performing operations over Laos and across the Vietnamese Demilitatrized Zone against targets in North Vietnam. The squadron returned to Bien Hoa on 8 March completing the evaluation program. The squadron remained in South Vietnam and in April it was redesignated the 10th Fighter Squadron, Commando.

On 1 April the first Combat Skyspot Ground-directed bombing radar system was installed at the base.

The rapid growth of units at Bien Hoa led to issues of overcrowding and electricity and water shortages which were only gradually addressed throughout 1966, while many units were undermanned for the increased demands placed on them.

On 23 February 1967 the base was the loading port for 845 paratroopers of the 173rd Airborne Brigade when they performed the first combat parachute jump of the war in Operation Junction City.

In the early morning of 12 May 1967, 53 rockets and over 150 mortar and recoilless rifle rounds hit the base damaging or destroying 49 US and RNAF aircraft.

==== 604th Air Commando Squadron A-37A Combat Dragon Program ====
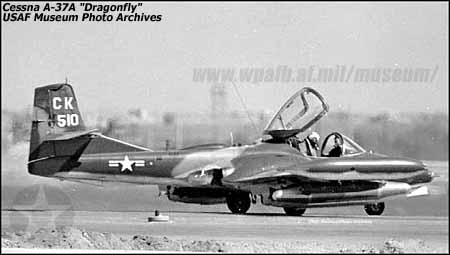
Cessna A-37A Dragonfly 67-14510 of the 604th Air Commando Squadron, 1968

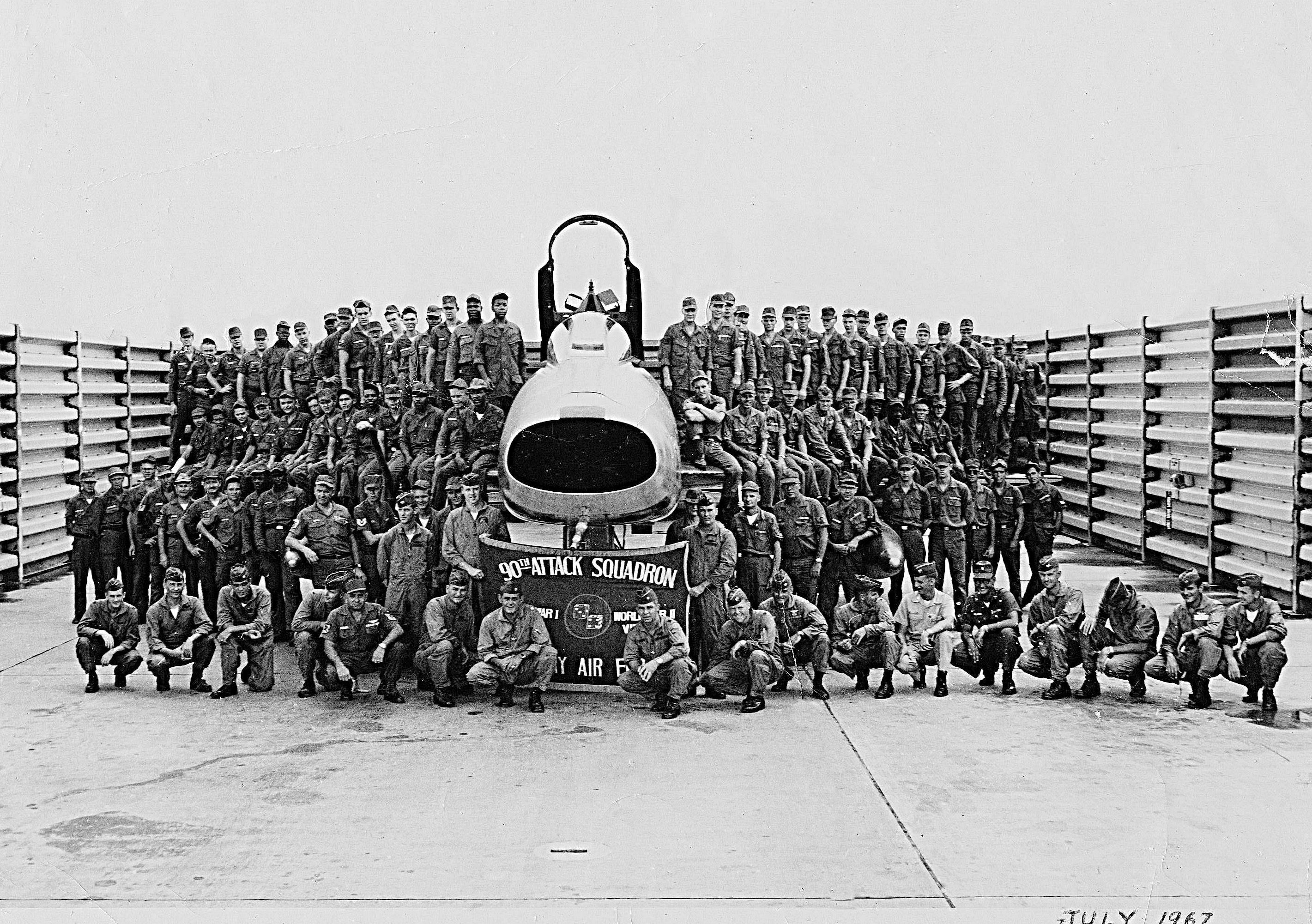
90th Attack Squadron - Squadron Photo, July 1967

On 17 July 1967 the 604th Air Commando Squadron flying the A-37A Dragonfly began arriving at the base to test the A-37 in combat over three months under a program named Combat Dragon.

Testing began on 15 August flying 12 close air support sorties daily, increasing to 60 by 5 September. In late October, some of the planes moved to Pleiku Air Base to perform armed and visual reconnaissance missions and night interdiction flights in the Tiger Hound operational area over southeastern Laos. The tests ended successfully in mid-December with only one aircraft lost and the squadron was then attached to the 14th Air Commando Wing at Nha Trang Air Base but it continued to fly out of Bien Hoa.

=== 1968 Tet Offensive and subsequent attacks ===
In the early morning of 31 January at the start of the Tet Offensive VC and People's Army of Vietnam (PAVN) forces hit the base with mortar and rocket fire and then attacked the eastern perimeter of the base, establishing a defensive position in an engine test stand. While the base security moved to attack this VC force, PAVN units infiltrated the perimeter in 3 different places and began firing on the base's III Corps Direct Air Support Center. An ARVN security force cornered a group of VC/PAVN in a supply shed and engaged them with recoilless rifle fire before USAF Security Police and ARVN forces finished them off with grenades and rifle fire. At dawn U.S. Army forces arrived at the base to engage the VC/PAVN.

The main gate was near the active runway of the 145th Aviation Battalion, a U.S. Army helicopter unit. The battalion's pilots lived off-base at the Honour-Smith Compound, a villa on Cong Ly Street in the city of Bien Hoa, some 2 kilometers away. Some were on base or made it there before the fire got too heavy and some of the gunships took off to patrol the base perimeters. Later intelligence reported that there were three main VC units that were to attack the base; the most critical attack was to force the main gate, overwhelm the helicopter active area and prevent gunships from taking off. Other attacks were to proceed across open ground to the main Air Force bunkers and to bring mounted machine guns to sweep the base runway.

Due to the battle raging at the east end of the runway F-100 fighter operations were curtailed for most of the day while USAF, RVNAF and U.S. Army forces engaged the VC. At about 16:00 two 531st TFS F-100s were launched to the east through the ground-fire with the intent of delivering ordnance on the battle raging on their own airbase. The actual strike was delayed because friendly forces were so close to the enemy forces. After about an hour of waiting the separation between forces was still small but considered adequate for the F-100s to deliver. The F-100 run-ins were from west to east releasing their ordnance in front of their own squadron for impact on the desired targets. This meant that crew chiefs and armorers actually got to see their aircraft in action. At the conclusion of the airstrike the F-100s landed to the east. The after action correspondence from the strike controller credited the airstrike with essentially ending the battle. This is perhaps the only time in USAF history that pilots have conducted a controlled airstrike on their own airbase.

USAF losses were four killed in action with another dying of a heart attack, while 26 were wounded. VC/PAVN losses were 137 killed and 25 captured. One A-37 and one F-100 were destroyed while a further 17 aircraft were damaged. The bodies of the VC/PAVN killed in the attack were buried in an unmarked mass grave on the edge of the base that was only uncovered in 2017.

The Tet Offensive attacks and previous losses due to mortar and rocket attacks on air bases across South Vietnam led the Deputy Secretary of Defense Paul Nitze on 6 March 1968 to approve the construction of 165 "Wonderarch" roofed aircraft shelters at the major air bases. In addition airborne "rocket watch" patrols were established in the Saigon-Bien Hoa area to reduce attacks by fire.

On 7 April 1968, following nighttime mortar attacks on the base, 14 C-130s each dropped four pallets of 16 55 gallon drums of Napalm over the forested area north of the base which were ignited by rockets causing a massive fire across the area.

After midnight on 5 May during the May Offensive the PAVN/VC shelled the base twice for three hours and then shelled it again at dawn wounding 11 USAF personnel and damaging 13 aircraft, five trucks and three 50,000-gallon rubber fuel bladders. A further artillery attack on 7 May caused minimal damage.

On 22 August 1968 an attack occurred at around 0100 from the north with most 122mm rockets landing on the Air Base and its ammo dump located north of the runways. One of the last rockets landed in a stack of 500-500 pound bombs that instantly detonated in one of the largest explosions caused by the enemy during the war.https://media.defense.gov/2010/Sep/21/2001330253/-1/-1/0/air_base_defense_in_the_republic_of_vietnam.pdf

On 26 February 1969 as part of the Tet 1969 attacks, elements of the PAVN 275th Regiment prepared to attack the base but were engaged about 3 km south of the base around the village of Thai Hiep.

From March 1969 the Combat Skyspot radar site at the base directed B-52 strikes against targets in Cambodia as part of the secret Operation Menu bombings.

On 1 September 1969 with the inactivation of the 3rd Special Operations Squadron, the 4th Special Operations Squadron took over its gunship role at Bien Hoa basing three AC-47s there until it too was inactivated on 15 December 1969.

On 21 January 1970 an artillery attack on the base damaged a C–123, a C–7 and a UH–1. A rocket attack on 27 February damaged three A-37s, two F-100s and a C-7. Two USAF personnel were killed in these attacks and 74 wounded.

=== 3rd Tactical Fighter Wing phasedown ===
In 1971, the 3rd TFW was preparing to inactivate and the wing began phasing down for inactivation as part of the American drawdown of forces. On 15 March 1971 the 3rd TFW inactivated at Bien Hoa and was simultaneously activated at Kunsan Air Base, South Korea, taking over the defensive mission there.

The 3rd TFW transferred its remaining resources to the 315th Tactical Airlift Wing at Phan Rang Air Base on 31 July 1971. Still flying its A-37s, the 8th Special Operations Squadron was attached to the 315th TAW, but physically remained at Bien Hoa Air Base. Then the 8th SOS was attached to the 377th Air Base Group (later 377th Air Base Wing) at Tan Son Nhut Air Base on 15 January 1972. Base rescue was provided by a daily rotation of 2 HH-43Fs of Detachment 14, 3d Aerospace Rescue and Recovery Group from Tan Son Nhut Air Base.

=== Easter Offensive ===
In response to the North Vietnamese Easter Offensive, the U.S. military built up its air forces in South Vietnam under Operation Constant Guard. On 14 April 1972 a turnaround service for F-4 Phantoms was established at the base. In addition a detachment of six AC–119K Stinger gunships and 150 men from the 18th Special Operations Squadron deployed from Nakhon Phanom Royal Thai Navy Base.

On 17 May, 32 U.S. Marine Corps A-4 Skyhawks of VMA-211 and VMA-311 arrived at Bien Hoa as part of Marine Aircraft Group 12 (Forward). The 8th Special Operations Squadron conducted familiarization flights in their A-37s for the Marines who were soon engaged in the Battle of An Lộc. On 21 May Company K, 3rd Battalion, 9th Marines was deployed to Bien Hoa to augment the USAF 6251st Security Police Squadron who were providing base security.

The PAVN attacked the base by fire repeatedly with the heaviest attack of 101 rockets on 1 August resulting in one Marine killed. Company K, 3/9 Marines was relieved by Company I 3/9 Marines on 10 August. On 30 August the PAVN fired more than 50 rockets into the base, destroying one USAF A-37 and damaging two USAF A-37s and one F-4 and three USMC A-4s and two RVNAF transport planes. On 10 September a PAVN/VC sapper attack caused an RVNAF ammunition storage dump to explode killing two South Vietnamese and wounding 29 Americans and 20 South Vietnamese, and at least 30 UH-1 helicopters were damaged

On 22 October the PAVN hit the base with 61 rockets.

On 29 January 1973 Marine Aircraft Group 12 (Forward), the last U.S. combat aviation unit in South Vietnam, left Bien Hoa.

== RVNAF use ==
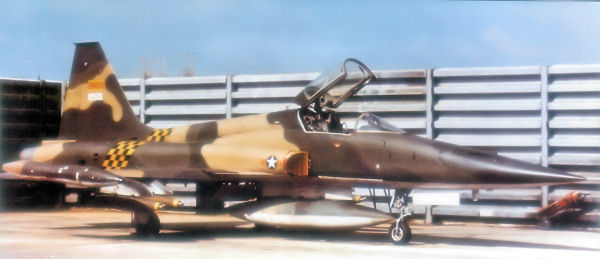
F-5C of the 522d Fighter Squadron/23rd Tactical Wing, 1971

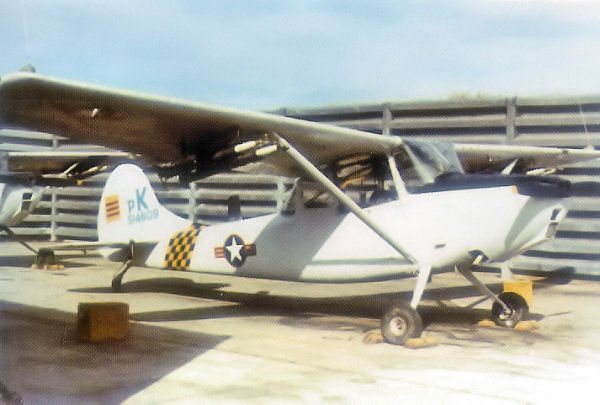
O-1 observation aircraft of the 112th Liaison Squadron/23rd Tactical Wing, 1971

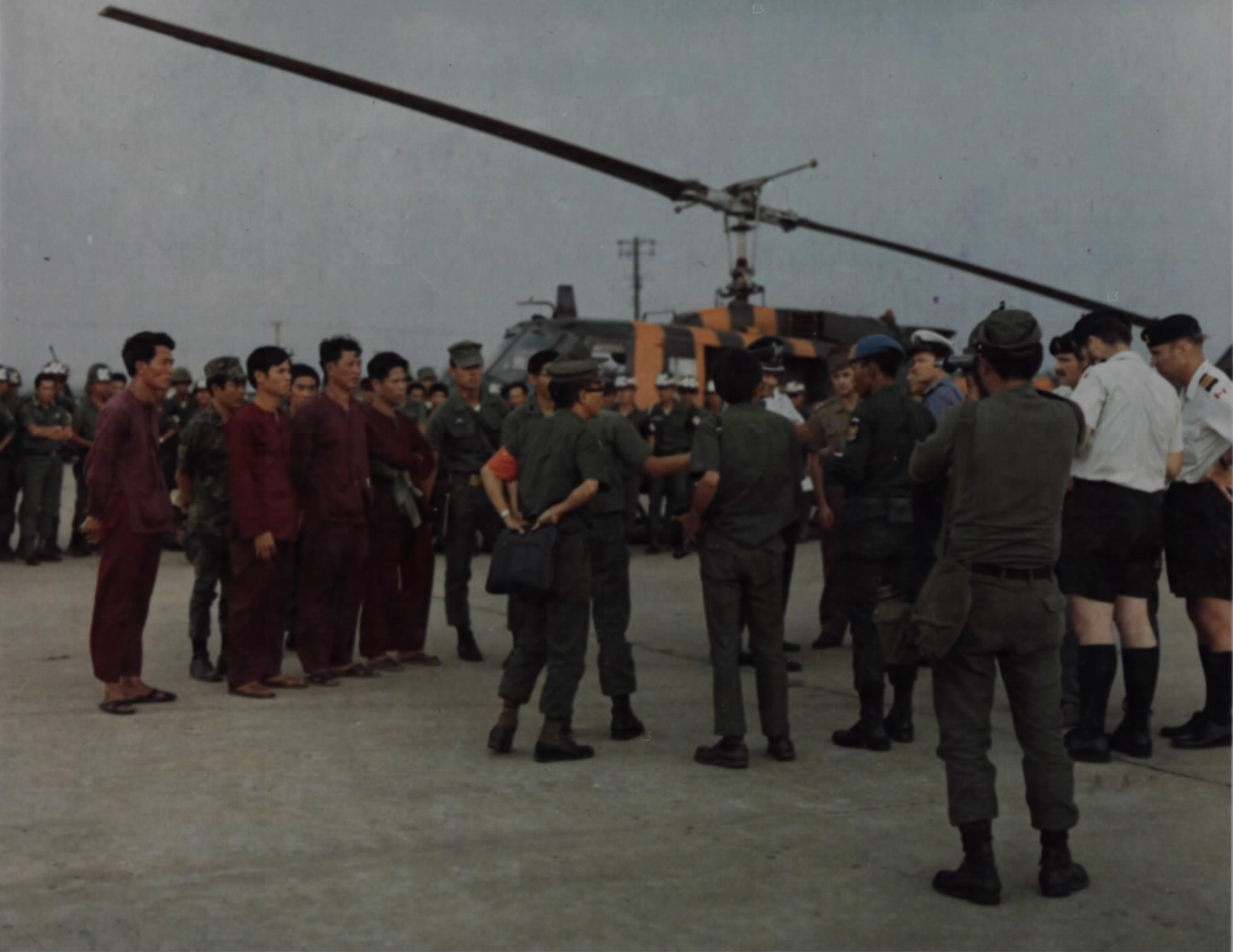
ICCS members talking with the leaders of prisoners who refuse repatriation to North Vietnam, 25 March 1973

On 1 June 1956 the RVNAF's 1st Fighter Squadron (redesignated the 514th Fighter Squadron in January 1963) was formed here equipped with 25 F8F Bearcats, later re-equipping with AD-6s. From this point Bien Hoa became the base of newly formed and continually growing air units. The RVNAF 2311th Air Group, later to become an air wing, and the 311th Air Division were also stationed there and the base supported the greatest number of air combat units than any other in South Vietnam.

On 18 March 1964 the newly formed 518th Fighter Squadron began operations from the base with an original strength of 10 A-1Hs, it would grow to 25 aircraft authorized. The RVNAF pilots were trained by crews from the U.S. Navy's VA-152.

In June 1964 the RVNAF formed the 23rd Tactical Wing at the base incorporating the 514th, 518th and the newly formed 520th Fighter Squadrons and the 112th Liaison Squadron. The 520th Fighter Squadron would be activated in October.

On 1 June 1967 the US Ambassador Ellsworth Bunker presented the 20 F-5As of the 10th Fighter Squadron (Commando) to Vice-president Nguyễn Cao Kỳ at the base. These aircraft would be used by the RVNAF to form the 522nd Fighter Squadron, their first jet squadron with training support provided by the USAF Air Training Command.

Following the final withdrawal of U.S. forces from South Vietnam in February 1973, Bien Hoa remained a major RVNAF base hosting the headquarters of the RVNAF 3d Air Division and the Air Logistics Command.

On 6 November 1973 a PAVN rocket attack on the base destroyed 3 F-5As.

On 3 June 1974 the PAVN hit the base with at least 40 122 mm rockets doing minor damage to runways and destroying 500 napalm canisters, but without damaging any aircraft. Other rockets exploded in hamlets surrounding the base, killing and wounding civilians.

June 1974 Table of Organization:

23d Tactical Wing

- 112th/124th Liaison squadron: O-1A, U-17A
- 514th/518th Fighter Squadron: A-1H

43d Tactical Wing

- 221st/223d/231st/245th/251st Helicopter Squadrons: UH-1H
- 237th Helicopter Squadron: CH-47A
- Det E 259th Helicopter Squadron: UH-1H (Medevac)

63d Tactical Wing

- 522nd/536th/540th/544th Fighter Squadrons: F-5A/B/C RF-5A

On 10 August 25 rockets hit the base with 7 hitting the F-5A storage area, slightly damaging a few planes.

== Capture of Bien Hoa Air Base ==
PAVN troops storm Bien Hoa Air Base

In early April 1975 the PAVN were closing in on the ARVN's last defensive line before Saigon. The town of Xuân Lộc stood at a strategic crossroads 70 km east of Bien Hoa and was defended by the ARVN 18th Division. On 9 April the PAVN 4th Corps comprising three Divisions attacked Xuân Lộc. The 18th Division defended the town tenaciously with air support from the RVNAF 3rd Division at Bien Hoa and the 5th Division at Tan Son Nhut AB.

On the morning of 15 April a PAVN sapper squad penetrated the base blowing up an ammunition dump and four PAVN 130mm field guns began shelling the base, later joined by 122mm rocket batteries which cratered the runways and severely restricted flight operations.

By 19 April Xuân Lộc was completely surrounded and the ARVN command ordered its forces there to withdraw to defend Saigon. On 20 April after launching a diversionary attack east of Xuân Lộc, the ARVN units in the town broke out and on 21 April the PAVN captured the town. On 25 April the 3rd Armored Regiment which was fighting at the town of Hung Nghia was ordered to withdraw west along Route 1 to defend Bien Hoa.

The ARVN formed a new defensive line east of Bien Hoa at the town of Trảng Bom which was defended by the remnants of the 18th Division, the 468th Marine Brigade and the reconstituted 258th Marine Brigade, which had disgraced itself during the fall of Da Nang.

At 04:00 on 27 April the 341st Division attacked Trang Bom, the initial attack was repulsed, but by 08:00 attacks on the flanks broke through and the town was captured with the 18th Division suffering heavy casualties in their retreat. The PAVN then advanced to the town of Hố Nai (now Tân Hòa), which was held by the Marines. Hố Nai was defended by the 6th Marine Battalion, an M48 tank from the 3rd Armored and Popular Forces. Following an artillery barrage the PAVN attacked Hố Nai, but were met by ARVN artillery losing 30 dead and one T-54 tank destroyed before they pulled back. On 28 April the 341st renewed their attack using five T-54s supported by an infantry regiment, but were repulsed in three separate attacks losing three T-54s and many soldiers.

On 29 April the entire 341st Division attacked Hố Nai and were again repulsed in two hours of fighting. At midday the Marines were ordered to withdraw to defend Bien Hoa and Long Binh. Brigadier General Trần Quang Khôi, commander of the 3rd Armored was given responsibility for defending Bien Hoa, although PAVN shelling had rendered the base unusable. Seeing the regular forces leaving Hố Nai, the PAVN renewed their assault at midnight on 30 April, but the town's Popular Forces fought back and were not subdued until dawn. The PAVN then advanced to Bien Hoa where they were met by the 3rd Armored, at this point the PAVN 4th Corps changed the axis of their advance to the south.

On the morning of 30 April the 18th Division and Marines were ordered to retreat from Long Binh to the west bank of the Đồng Nai river, while the ARVN 81st Rangers held Bien Hoa Air Base and the 3rd Armored held Bien Hoa. The 3rd Armored was moving from Bien Hoa to attack PAVN forces when they heard the surrender broadcast of President Dương Văn Minh and BG Khôi halted his advance and disbanded the unit. The 81st Rangers had abandoned the base and had moved west of the Đồng Nai river when they heard the surrender broadcast and then marched towards Saigon to surrender to the PAVN.

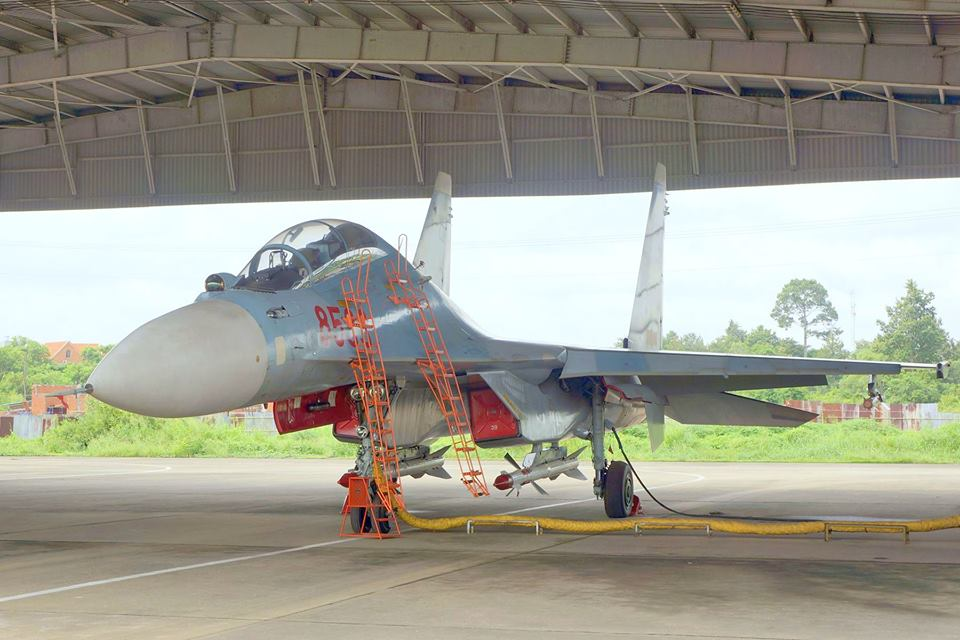
A Vietnamese Sukhoi Su-30MK2 multirole jetfighter is stationed at Bien Hoa

== Contemporary Vietnamese utilization ==
The VN ADAF 935th Fighter Regiment equipped with Sukhoi Su-30MK2 is based at Bien Hoa.

In April 2019 it was announced that the United States Agency for International Development was beginning a 10-year US$183 million project to decontaminate the base of Dioxin caused by Agent Orange defoliant stored at the base during the Vietnam War. The base was described as the most contaminated site in Vietnam and Dioxin had contaminated the soil and waterways. In 2025 this work was impacted by cuts to USAID ordered by the Trump administration.

== Accidents and incidents ==
- In March 1966 a C-123 of the 311th Air Commando Squadron carrying 6 tons of artillery shells was hit by ground fire while climbing from the base, starting a fire in the left engine, it turned back and made an emergency landing and was destroyed by fire after landing.
- On 13 December 1968, a USAF Douglas AC-47D Spooky (#43-49274) collided in mid-air with OV-10 Bronco (#67-14627) while both aircraft were on a night-time combat operation at Truc Giang. Both aircraft attempted to return to Bien Hoa Air Base but the OV-10 crashed, killing both crew. The AC-47D was damaged beyond economic repair when its undercarriage collapsed on landing.

== See also ==
- Khmer Air Force
- Royal Lao Air Force
- Royal Thai Air Force
- Republic of Vietnam Air Force
- United States Pacific Air Forces
- Seventh Air Force

== Bibliography ==
- Endicott, Judy G. (1999) Active Air Force wings as of 1 October 1995; USAF active flying, space, and missile squadrons as of 1 October 1995. Maxwell AFB, Alabama: Office of Air Force History. CD-ROM.
- Kelley, Michael P., Where We Were in Vietnam, Hellgate Press, 2002, ISBN 1-55571-625-3
- Martin, Patrick (1994). Tail Code: The Complete History of USAF Tactical Aircraft Tail Code Markings. Schiffer Military Aviation History. ISBN 0-88740-513-4.
- McGibbon, Ian (2010). New Zealand's Vietnam War: A History of Combat, Commitment and Controversy. Auckland: Exisle. ISBN 9780908988969.
- Mesco, Jim (1987) VNAF Republic of Vietnam Air Force 1945-1975 Squadron/Signal Publications. ISBN 0-89747-193-8
- Mikesh, Robert C. (2005) Flying Dragons: The Republic of Vietnam Air Force. Schiffer Publishing, Ltd. ISBN 0-7643-2158-7
- USAF Historical Research Division/Organizational History Branch - 35th Fighter Wing, 366th Wing
- VNAF - The Republic of Vietnam Air Force 1951-1975
- USAAS-USAAC-USAAF-USAF Aircraft Serial Numbers--1908 to present
