= Rollin (name) =

Rollin is both a surname and a masculine given name. Notable people with the name include:

== Surname ==
- Anita Rollin, Sri Lankan snowboarder
- Bernard Rollin (1943–2021), American philosopher, ethicist and author
- Betty Rollin (born 1936), American journalist
- Charles Rollin (1661–1741), French historian and educationist
- Dominique Rollin (born 1982), Canadian cyclist
- Henri Rollin (1885–1955), French essayist
- Jean Rollin (1938–2010), French film director, actor and writer
- Kenneth Rollin (born 1937), English rugby league player
- Louis Rollin (1879-1952), French politician
- The Rollin Sisters, five African-American sisters who were influential in politics in the Reconstruction Era

== Given name ==
- Rollin V. Ankeny (1830-1901), American Civil War Union brevet brigadier general
- Rollin Cook (1890–1975), American baseball player
- Rollin M. Daggett (1831–1901), American politician and diplomat
- Rollin Dart (1925–2016), American banker
- Rollin Josiah Dutton (1884-1955), American businessman and politician
- Rollin Glewwe (1933-2020), American politician and businessman
- Rollin Lynde Hartt (1869–1946), American journalist
- Rollin Hamilton (1898–1951), American animator
- Rollin Hotchkiss (1911–2004), American biochemist
- Rollin Howard (1840–1879), American minstrel performer
- Rollin Howell (born 1929), American politician
- Rollin Fritch (1920-1945), USCG silver star awardee
- Rollin King (1931–2014), American businessman
- Rollin Kirby (1875–1952), American political cartoonist
- Rollin Carolas Mallary (1784–1831), American lawyer and politician
- Rollin H. Person (1850-1917), American jurist
- Rollin Prather (1925-1996), Canadian football player
- Rollin Putzier (born 1965), American football player
- Rollin R. Rees (1865–1935), American politician
- Rollin C. Richmond, American geneticist and academic
- Rollin D. Salisbury (1858–1922), American geologist and educator
- Rollin B. Sanford (1874–1957), American politician
- Rollin S. Sturgeon (1877-1961), American silent film director
- Rollin White (1817-1892), American gunsmith and inventor
- Rollin S. Williamson (1839–1889), American politician
- Rollin S. Woodruff (1854–1925), American politician

== Fictional characters ==
- Rollin Hand, secret agent in the Mission Impossible TV series

== See also ==
- Rollins (disambiguation)
- Rollen, a list of people with the given name or surname
