= Anthis =

Anthis is a surname. Notable people with the surname include:

- Jacy Reese Anthis (born 1992), American writer
- Rollen Henry Anthis (1915–1995), US Air Force major general
