= Rollen =

Rollen may refer to:

- Rollen Henry Anthis (1915–1995), United States Air Force major general
- Rollen Hans (1931–2021), American basketball player
- Rollen Seleso, Solomon Islands politician
- Rollen Stewart (born 1944), American sports fan fixture and convicted kidnapper
- Ola Rollén, Swedish entrepreneur and CEO

== See also ==
- Rollin (name)
