= Operation Farm Gate =

Part of the Vietnam War (1961–1963)

- Part of the Vietnam War
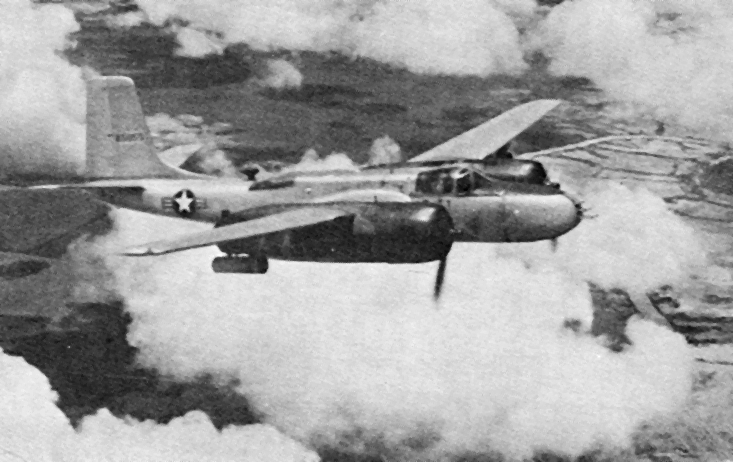
- A Farm Gate B-26B over South Vietnam
Date	19 December 1961 – 17 June 1963
Location	South Vietnam

Belligerents
United States; South Vietnam	(South Vietnam) Viet Cong

Commanders and leaders
(United States) Rollen Henry Anthis	

Units involved
(United States) 4400th Combat Crew Training Squadron	

Casualties and losses
(United States) 16 killed	

Farm Gate was the code name for a United States Air Force (USAF) mission operating in Vietnam before the overt US entry into the Vietnam War.

== History ==
In the early 1960s, the U.S. armed forces were developing units specifically designed to counter guerrilla warfare. The first USAF unit of this nature was the 4400th Combat Crew Training Squadron code named "Jungle Jim" that were later renamed the 1st Air Commando Wing (after the similarly named 1st Air Commando Group which served in the China Burma India Theater of World War II). The squadron specialized in tactics used to support friendly ground forces in small, 'brushfire' conflicts. In October 1961, John F. Kennedy authorized the deployment of a detachment of Air Commandos to South Vietnam. The 4400th CCTS headed from their home at Eglin Air Force Base, Florida, to Bien Hoa Air Base in South Vietnam. Their mission was to train the Republic of Vietnam Air Force (RVNAF) using older aircraft in support of the type of conflict they were facing. Crews were trained to fly the T-28 Trojan, C-47 Skytrain and B-26 Invader. The code name for the 4400th CCTS and its mission was Farm Gate. At least four of the B-26s had initially been earmarked for use in Operation Haik in Indonesia. These aircraft had initially been sourced by the CIA backed Civil Air Transport from the bone yard at Clark Field AB, Philippines and were to be used by anti-Sukarno rebels. Ultimately, only one of the aircraft later used in Farm Gate, B-26B 44-34376, was actively used for operations in Indonesia. The initial combat training sorties commenced on 19 December 1961.

On 26 December 1961, Washington issued new regulations directing that all Farm Gate missions would include at least one South Vietnamese national on board every aircraft. Secretary of Defense Robert McNamara further amplified this requirement by stating that the Vietnamese would fly in the backseat position. While the aircraft were often piloted by American "advisers," for training purposes, it was required by Washington that a South Vietnamese be part of the crew on board any combat missions. In the event an aircraft did get shot down in hostile territory, the presence of a Vietnamese crewman would be enough to dodge potential accusations of violating the Geneva Accords (actual interpretation of this regulation was somewhat liberal, however). There were some reports of hapless South Vietnamese enlisted men being thrown into the back seats of T-28s and flown into combat by American pilots after having been told not to touch anything in the cockpit. The gradual but dramatic expansion of Operation Farm Gate reflected the increasing involvement of the United States in Vietnam.

Within days of arrival, the T-28s and pilots were ready for orientation flights. The Farm Gate pilots launched with RVNAF escorts and delivered their ordnance, but, when mission reports were reviewed, the crews were told not to conduct independent air operations. The cover story was that the Americans were in-country to train South Vietnamese pilots. The first Farm Gate combat sorties were flown on 13 January 1962; by month's end, 229 missions had been flown. Flying from Bien Hoa and air bases being improved up-country at Da Nang and Pleiku, T-28 and B-26 operations emphasized "training" for reconnaissance, surveillance, interdiction, and close air support missions.

The SC-47s began flying airdrop and "psyop" leaflet and loudspeaker broadcast missions to forward bases where the United States Army's Special Forces teams were working with the rapidly growing South Vietnamese Civilian Irregular Defense Groups. On 11 February 1962, a Farm Gate SC-47 on a leaflet drop mission crashed, killing the six airmen, two soldiers and one Vietnamese crewman on board. This was the first of several Farm Gate losses.

Viet Cong (VC) attacks were increasing across the countryside, and there were rising calls for air support to embattled ground troops. Forward operating locations were opened at Qui Nhon and Sóc Trăng Airfield. Commanders at 2nd Air Division could see that the RVNAF could not meet all needs, and they increasingly turned to Farm Gate crews to fly the sorties.

Realizing that he needed more assets, the commander of 2nd Air Division, then Brig. Gen. Rollen Henry Anthis, asked for additional Air Force personnel and aircraft for Farm Gate use. Anthis wanted 10 more B-26s, five more T-28s, and two more SC-47s. McNamara reviewed the request, but he was cool to the idea of expanding Farm Gate units for combat use. His goal was to build up the RVNAF so it could operate without American help. Still, McNamara approved the request for additional aircraft and also assigned two U-10s to Farm Gate.

On 20 July 1963 an SC-47 crew flew an emergency night mission to Lộc Ninh and, disregarding enemy fire, strong winds, and blacked-out conditions, landed and rescued six severely wounded South Vietnamese troops. The 602nd Air Commando Squadron also was activated, flying A-1E Skyraiders.

On 17 June 1963 Headquarters USAF disestablished Farm Gate as a detachment of the Special Air Warfare Center and activated in its place the 1st Air Commando Squadron (Composite) at Bien Hoa Air Base, with Detachment 1 at Pleiku Air Base and Detachment 2 at Sóc Trăng. On 8 July the squadron, with an approved strength of 41 aircraft and 474 men, was assigned to 34th Tactical Group, 2nd Air Division. Between October 1961 and July 1963, 16 Farm Gate air commandos were killed. Also lost were one SC-47, four T-28s, one U-10, and four B-26s.
