= Pleiku Air Base =

Former airbase in Vietnam

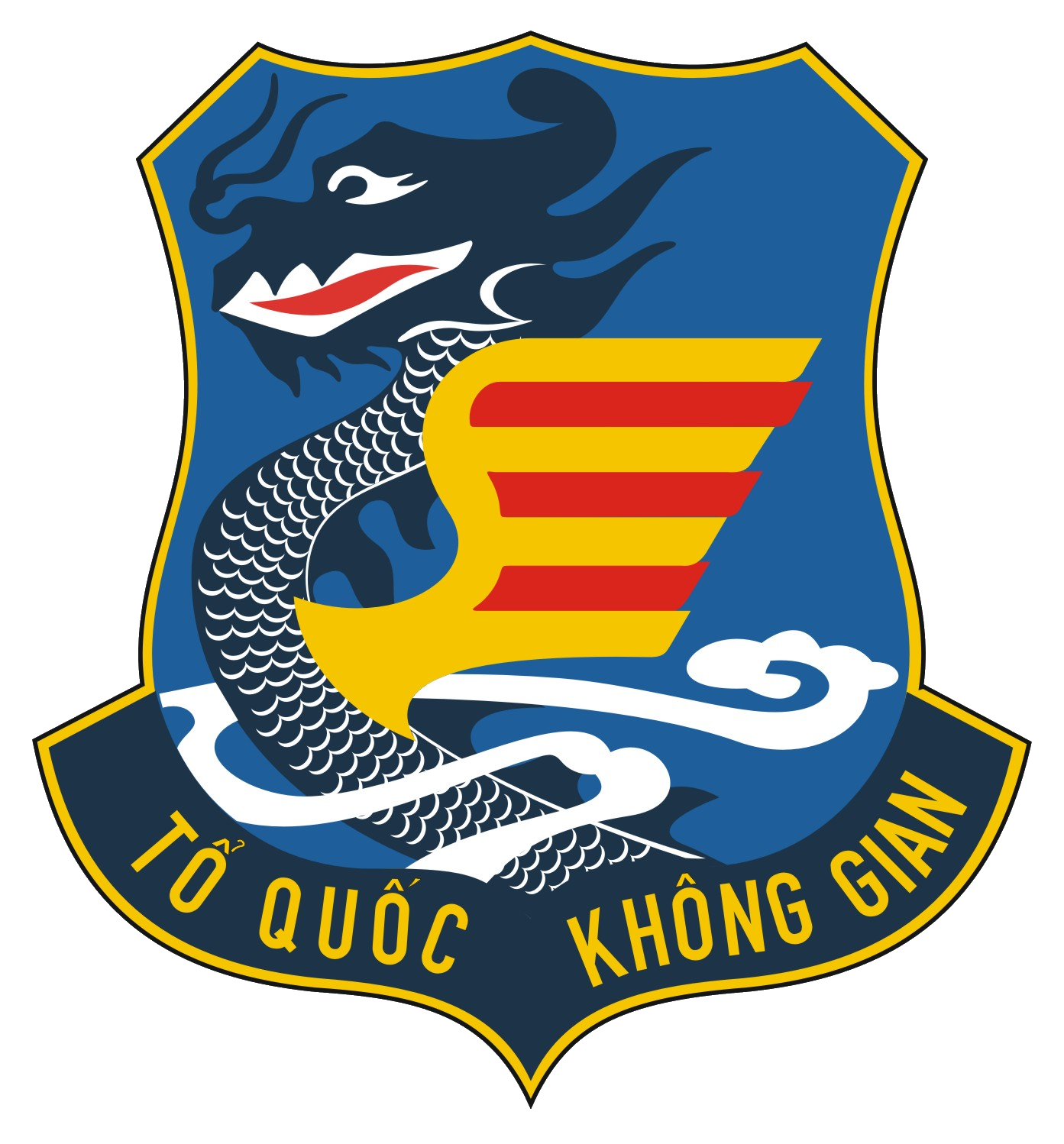
Pleiku Air Base
- Part of Republic of Vietnam Air Force (RVNAF); Pacific Air Forces (USAF)
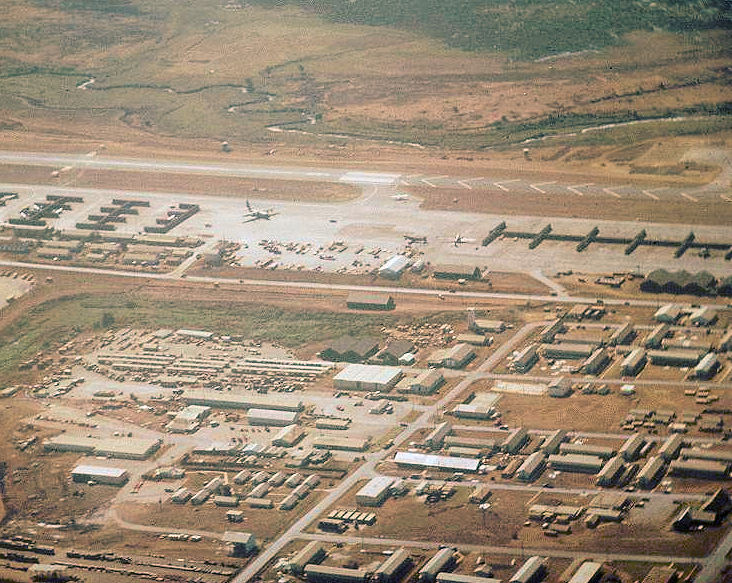
- Pleiku Air Base South Vietnam – 1969

Site information
- Type: Air Force Base
- Controlled by: Republic of Vietnam Air Force; United States Air Force
- Condition: Seized 1975 by PAVN, Now Civil Airport

Location
- Location of Pleiku Air Base, Vietnam
- Coordinates: 14°00′16″N 108°01′02″E

Site history
- Built: 1962
- In use: 1962–1975
- Battles/wars: Vietnam War

Garrison information
- Garrison: 6th Air Division (RVNAF); 72d Tactical Wing (RVNAF); 633d Special Operations Wing (USAF)

Airfield information
- IATA: none; ICAO: none

Summary
- Elevation AMSL: 2,434 ft (742 m)
- Interactive map of Airfield information

Runways
Direction	Length		Surface
Direction	ft	m	Surface
09/27	5,960	1,817	Asphalt

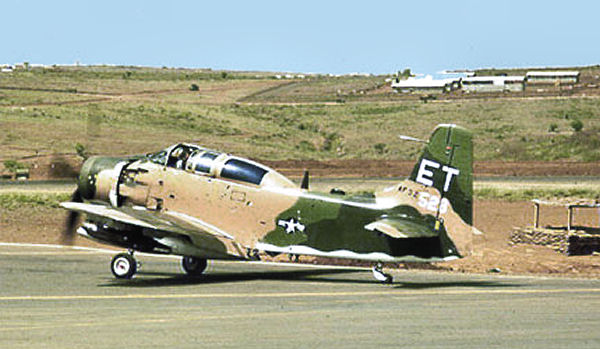
A-1E Skyraider of the 6th Special Operations Squadron at Pleiku AB

Pleiku Air Base is a former air force base in Vietnam. It was established by the Republic of Vietnam Air Force (RVNAF) in 1962 at an undeveloped airstrip, and was used by the United States Air Force during the Vietnam War in the II Corps Tactical Zone of South Vietnam. It was captured by the People's Army of Vietnam (PAVN) in March 1975 and was abandoned for many years. Today, the facility has been redeveloped as Pleiku Airport.

== Origins ==
In January 1962, the U.S. Military Assistance Advisory Group in Vietnam requested the Department of Defense contract construction agent, the U.S. Navy Officer in Charge of Construction RVN (OICC), to design and construct a 6,000-foot (1,800 m) runway at Pleiku. The MAAG wanted the air field to be operational as a top priority by 1 July 1962. Although the design had not yet been started, the OICC tasked RMK-BRJ, the construction contractor, to begin work on 19 January. They installed 6,000 feet of pierced steel plank (PSP) runway with over-runs, a parallel taxiway, and aprons at a cost of $2.7 million. The airfield was completed on 20 June 1962. RMK-BRJ returned in 1964 to replace the PSP runway with three-inch asphalt pavement.

The RVNAF 1st Fighter Squadron staged two AD-6 Skyraiders at Pleiku AB from late 1961 and this force was later increased to four A-1s and a C-47 flareship. In December 1962 Pleiku Air Base was activated by the RVNAF as Air Base 62 and in March 1964 Air Base 62 became the RVNAF 62nd Tactical Wing. The RVNAF 114th Liaison Squadron moved to Pleiku in 1963. In January 1965 the 62nd Wing and a detachment of the 516th Fighter Squadron moved to Nha Trang Air Base. Pleiku Air Base was then managed by the RVNAF 92nd Base Support Group and the base was used as a staging and emergency airfield.

== Use by the United States during the Vietnam War ==
As North Vietnamese infiltration increased within and along the Laotian and Cambodian borders the importance of Pleiku Air Base increased, and base facilities were expanded and improved by American Army and Air Force civil engineering units. The base was jointly used for both RVNAF and USAF air activities, but never reached the saturation and population proportions of the major air bases of the coastal lowlands. The USAF forces stationed at Pleiku were under the jurisdiction of the Seventh Air Force, United States Pacific Air Forces (PACAF). The APO for Pleiku was APO San Francisco, 96318.

The 4400th Combat Crew Training Squadron, code named Farm Gate began operations in South Vietnam in 1961. In 1962 a detachment of Farm Gate B-26 Invaders began operations from Pleiku AB and by February 1963 this had grown to six B-26s and one C-47.

In March 1962 the II Air Support Operations Center became operational at the base. In June 1962 Detachment 1, 6220th Air Base Squadron was activated at the base. In December 1962 Detachment 3, 8th Aerial Port Squadron was activated at the base.

Army units:

- 57th Medical Detachment (Helicopter Ambulance) with Bell UH-1B Huey's from March 1963.
- A detachment of 498th Medical Company (Air Ambulance) with UH-1D Hueys from October 1965.
- 52nd Aviation Battalion was deployed here during December 1964.

In late 1964 a detachment of two Kaman HH-43 Huskie (B variants) were stationed at the base for rescue and local search and rescue. On 15 September 1965 this detachment was redesignated as Detachment 9, 38th Aerospace Rescue and Recovery Squadron. On 16 February 1970 Detachment 9 was moved from Pleiku AB to Nakhon Phanom Royal Thai Air Force Base, Thailand.

In mid-1965 Pleiku AB became a forward operating location for four Douglas AC-47 Spooky gunships of B Flight, 4th Air Commando Squadron. By December 1969 B Flight had been reduced to two AC-47s as the aircraft was increasingly phased out of USAF service.

In September 1965 the 21st Tactical Air Support Squadron equipped with 30 O-1 Bird Dogs began operating from Pleiku AB.

The 1878th Communications Squadron was designated and organized at Pleiku Airport on 1 November 1965, part of the 1964th Communications Group. It was reassigned 1 January 1972 and moved to Little Rock Air Force Base, Arkansas.

The 633d Combat Support Group was activated at the base on 14 March 1966 taking over the duties of the provisional 6234th Air Base Squadron which had managed construction and other activities at the base after the RVNAF moved to Nha Trang.

The A-1 equipped 1st Air Commando Squadron moved to Pleiku on 1 January 1966 from Bien Hoa Air Base where it had operated as part of Farm Gate. The 1st Air Commando Squadron moved to Nakhon Phanom RTAFB in early 1967.

During 1966 USAF personnel assigned to the base increased from 150 to over 2500. In September 13 barracks housing 900 men were completed and in October a further 10 barracks were completed.

The 9th Air Commando Squadron was activated at Pleiku on 25 January 1967 flying special operations missions using modified C-47s and O-2B Skymasters. During its active service, the 9th ACS flew combat missions, including air support for ground forces, air cover for transports, day and night interdiction, combat search and rescue support, armed reconnaissance, and forward air control. The squadron relocated to Nha Trang Air Base on 1 November 1967.

In late October 1967, some of the 604th Air Commando Squadron Combat Dragon A-37A Dragonflys moved to the base from Bien Hoa AB to perform armed and visual reconnaissance missions and night interdiction flights in the Tiger Hound operational area over southeastern Laos.

From 1968 to 27 June 1972 the 362d Tactical Electronic Warfare Squadron flying specially-equipped EC-47s were assigned to Pleiku. These aircraft were equipped with various electronic warfare components.

=== 633d Special Operations Wing ===
The 633rd Special Operations Wing was activated at Pleiku on 15 July 1968. Its mission was to provide close air support, day and night interdiction, and visual and photo reconnaissance.

The only unit assigned to the 633d Special Operations Wing was the 6th Special Operations Squadron equipped with 20 A-1E/H which deployed to Pleiku on 29 February 1968. During the stay at Pleiku, the squadron maintained a forward SAR alert unit at Da Nang Air Base from 1 April 1968 – 1 September 1969. The squadron was inactivated in place on 15 November 1969. With the departure of its personnel in late 1969, a small group remained at Pleiku for a short period of time to advise the RVNAF.

The 633d Wing inactivated on 15 March 1970. For its actions at Pleiku Air Base, the wing was awarded the Air Force Outstanding Unit Award – with Combat "V" Device and the Republic Of Vietnam Gallantry Cross – with Palm.

On 19 May 1970 a PAVN rocket attack on the base destroyed 1 EC-47 and damaged 2 more. Another rocket attack on 26 May damaged 2 more EC-47s.

== RVNAF at Pleiku ==
In March 1970 the USAF began handing the base over to the RVNAF and this transfer was completed by the end of 1970.

Pleiku AB was one of the 2 operating bases of the RVNAF 6th Air Division, the other being Phù Cát Air Base.

The RVNAF established the 72d Tactical Wing at the base with the 530th Fighter Squadron equipped with A-1 Skyraiders, along with two UH-1H helicopter assault squadrons (229th, 235th) and the 118th Liaison Squadron, with Cessna O-2A, U-17 forward air controller/light reconnaissance aircraft.

The RVNAF 817th Combat Squadron equipped with AC-47s deployed alert aircraft to the base.

After the 1973 Paris Peace Accords, Pleiku AB became a center of reconnaissance in the Central Highlands, with the RVNAF monitoring PAVN activity and treaty violations.

In 1974, the RVNAF had the following units assigned to Pleiku Air Base:

- 6th Air Division (Headquarters)
- 72d Tactical Wing

118th Liaison Squadron Cessna O-2A, U-17
530th Fighter Squadron A-1
229th/235th Helicopter Squadron Bell UH-1H
Det B 259th Helicopter Squadron Bell UH-1H (Medevac)

=== Capture of Pleiku Air Base ===
By the early spring of 1975 North Vietnam realized the time was right to achieve its goal of re-uniting Vietnam under communist rule, and so launched a series of small ground attacks to test U.S. reaction. When these attacks failed to draw a military response from Washington, the PAVN staged an attack on Ban Me Thuot in the Central Highlands. Ban Me Thuot controlled Highways 14 and 21, vital lines of communication from the southern Central Highlands to Saigon and the coast.

On the night of 9 March 1975, the PAVN struck the city and Pleiku airfield with artillery, mortars, and rockets. By the next afternoon, over half of Ban Me Thuot was in enemy hands, despite fierce resistance from ARVN defenders. RVNAF air strikes destroyed five PAVN tanks but during one strike, a bomb accidentally hit ARVN sector headquarters severely disrupting communications.

At Pleiku airfield, the small ARVN garrison came under attack and was forced to defend the control tower, preventing attempts to fly in reinforcements. ARVN reinforcements were diverted to Buon Ho, north of the city, far from the battle. On the airfield, the PAVN had destroyed an O-1, a CH-47, and ten UH-1s, although three damaged UH-1s had managed to escape. Fierce fighting continued for three more days but by 14 March the situation was hopeless. During the four-day battle the RVNAF flew over 200 sorties, inflicting heavy losses on the PAVN, but to no avail. No aircraft were lost in the air, but three A-37s at Pleiku were destroyed by 122 mm rockets on 11 March when the PAVN rocketed the airfield.

The day Ban Me Thuot fell, President Nguyễn Văn Thiệu called an emergency high level meeting at Cam Ranh Bay. During this meeting Thieu made the decision to attempt an orderly withdrawal from the Central Highlands around Kontum and Pleiku in order to conserve forces and regroup for a counter-attack. Unfortunately for the South Vietnamese, the commander of the region, General Phạm Văn Phú, misinterpreted this order and directed an immediately evacuation of both cities. The commander of the 6th Air Division at Pleiku, BG Pham Ngoc Sang was given forty-eight hours to evacuate the airfield and immediately requested UH-1s, CH-47s, and C-130s to fly RVNAF personnel and their dependants out of Pleiku.

On 16 March artillery fire began hitting the city and ARVN troops began a retreat to the coast along Highway 7B. At Pleiku airfield sixty-four aircraft were abandoned with little effort to destroy them before evacuating and large quantities of fuel and ordnance were left behind undamaged and ready for the PAVN to use.

== Current use ==
After the seizure of the base by the PAVN in 1975, the captured RVNAF aircraft were either destroyed or flown out to other airfields and Pleiku Air Base was abandoned, apparently remaining so for many years. Today, a small airport terminal building has been erected on the pad of one of the former USAF hangars. The former base facility has been torn down and a few streets remain, the land now being used for agriculture; none of the former base buildings remain. The large aircraft parking ramp remains but is largely abandoned, along with the jet taxiway which is unused. The former USAF control tower and large fire department building on the flightline remains standing; their current use is undetermined.

== See also ==
- Republic of Vietnam Air Force
- United States Pacific Air Forces
- Seventh Air Force

== Bibliography ==
- Endicott, Judy G. (1999) Active Air Force wings as of 1 October 1995; USAF active flying, space, and missile squadrons as of 1 October 1995. Maxwell AFB, Alabama: Office of Air Force History. CD-ROM.
- Martin, Patrick (1994). Tail Code: The Complete History of USAF Tactical Aircraft Tail Code Markings. Schiffer Military Aviation History. ISBN 0-88740-513-4.
- Mesco, Jim (1987) VNAF Republic of Vietnam Air Force 1945–1975 Squadron/Signal Publications. ISBN 0-89747-193-8
- Mikesh, Robert C. (2005) Flying Dragons: The Republic of Vietnam Air Force. Schiffer Publishing, Ltd. ISBN 0-7643-2158-7
- USAF Historical Research Division/Organizational History Branch – 35th Fighter Wing, 366th Wing
- VNAF – The Republic of Vietnam Air Force 1951–1975
- USAAS-USAAC-USAAF-USAF Aircraft Serial Numbers—1908 to present
