= Rollins (disambiguation) =

Rollins is a surname. It may also refer to:

== Places ==
In the United States

- Rollins, Georgia, an unincorporated community
- Rollins, Minnesota, an unincorporated community
- Rollins, Montana, a census-designated place
- Rollins Mountain, Maine
- Rollins Pass, Rocky Mountains, Colorado
- Rollins State Park, New Hampshire

== Other ==
- Rollins, Inc., North American consumer and commercial services company founded in 1948
- Rollins School of Public Health, part of Emory University
- Rollins College, Florida
- Rollins House, a historic home in Florida
- USNS Rollins (T-AG-189)
- Rollins A. Emerson (1873–1947), American geneticist

== See also ==
- Rollins Band, an American rock group led by Henry Rollins
- Young & Rollins, a guitar duo
- John R. Rollins School, a historic school in Massachusetts
