= 604th Special Operations Squadron =

604th Special Operations Squadron

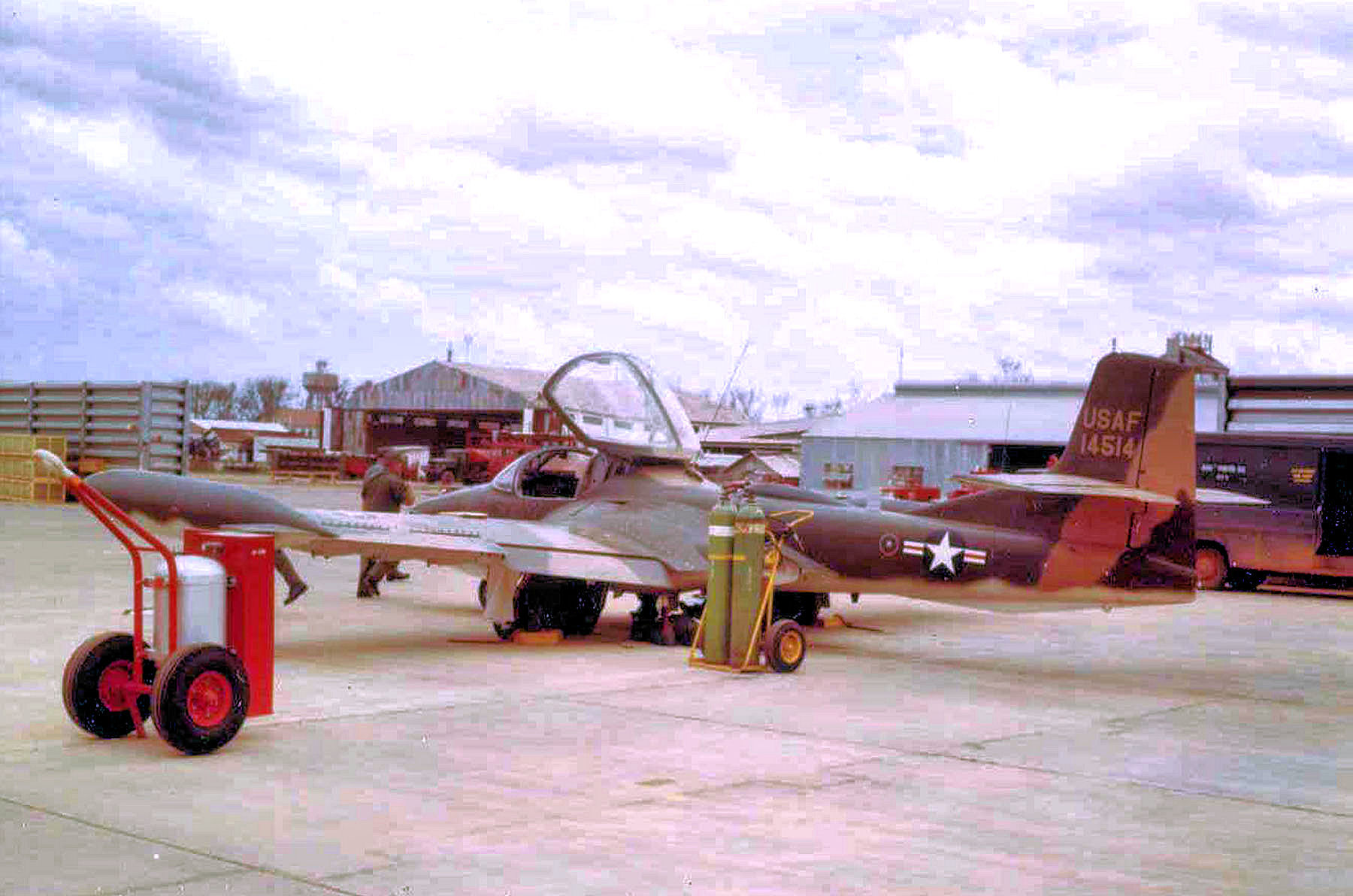
- A-37A Dragonfly at Bien Hoa AB in 1968
- Active: 1944–1946; 1963–1964; 1967–1970
- Country: United States
- Branch: United States Air Force
- Role: Special Operations
- Nickname: Mattel Marauders (Vietnam)
- Decorations: Presidential Unit Citation; Air Force Outstanding Unit Award w/Combat "V" Device; Philippine Republic Presidential Unit Citation; Vietnamese Gallantry Cross with Palm

Insignia
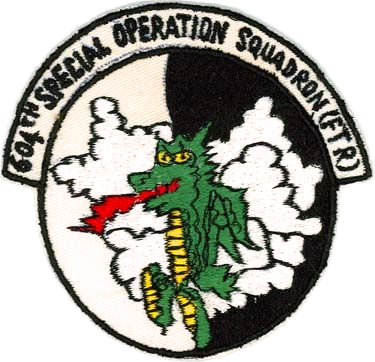
- 604th Special Operations Squadron emblem
- Viet Nam Tail Code: CK

The 604th Special Operations Squadron is an inactive United States Air Force squadron It was last active at Bien Hoa Air Base, Vietnam, where it was inactivated in September 1970.

The squadron was first activated in the spring of 1944 as the 4th Fighter Reconnaissance Squadron, although it was soon redesignated the 4th Fighter Squadron (Commando). It moved to the Pacific in the fall of 1944 and earned a Philippine Republic Presidential Unit Citation for combat in the Philippines. After the surrender of Japan, it served in the occupation forces until being inactivated in March 1946.

The squadron was active briefly as the 604th Fighter Squadron, Commando from 1963 to 1964 in a build-up of Air Force counterinsurgency units in a period of increased American involvement in Southeast Asia. It was activated again as the 604th Air Commando Squadron, Fighter in 1967 to test the combat capability of the Cessna A-37A Dragonfly and moved to Vietnam where it engaged in combat until 1970, when it was inactivated as the Air Force began to withdraw forces from the country. The squadron was awarded two Presidential Unit Citations, an Air Force Outstanding Unit Award with Combat "V" Device and three Vietnamese Gallantry Crossed with Palm for its actions during the war.

== History ==
=== World War II ===
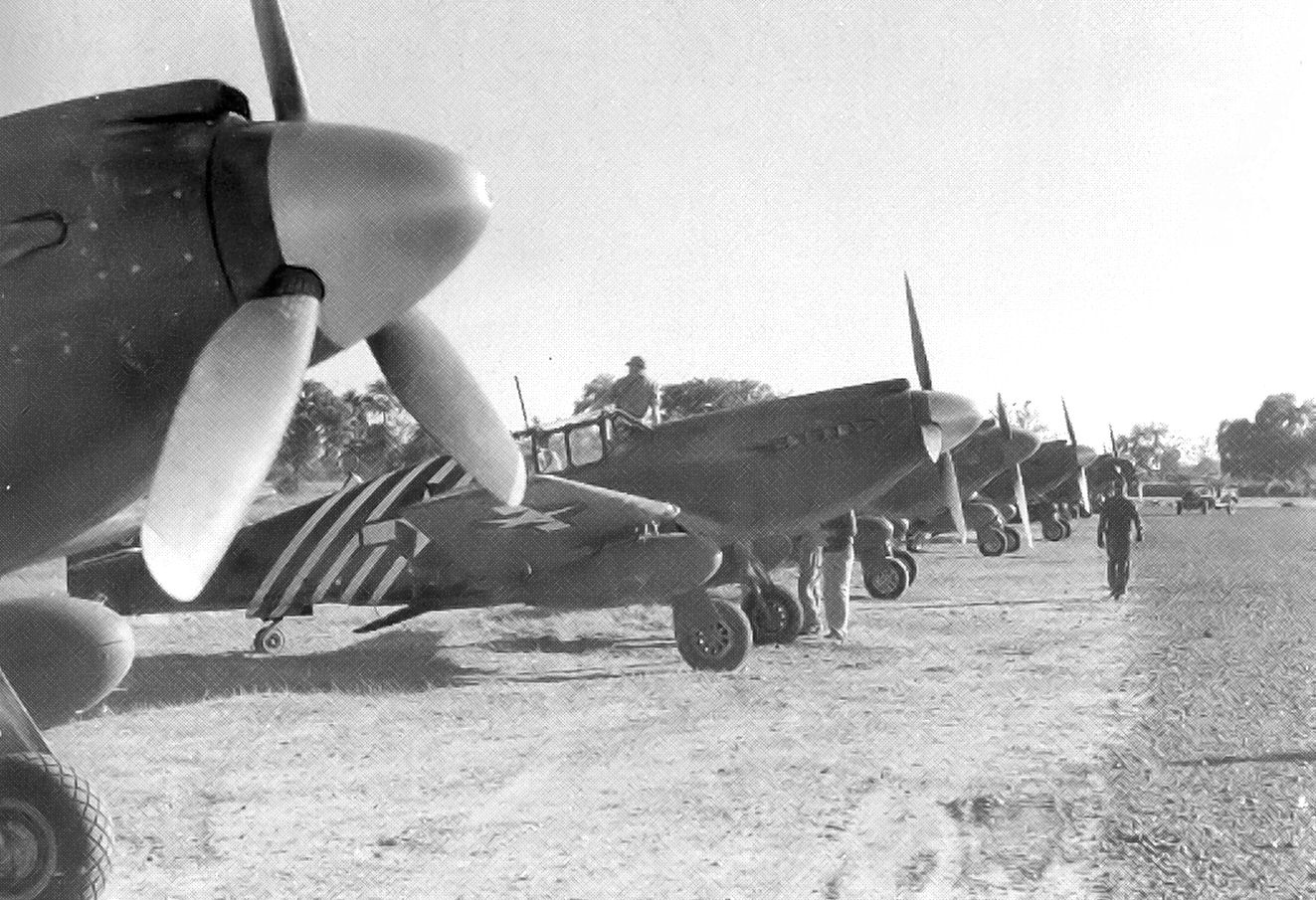
P-51s of an Air Commando unit

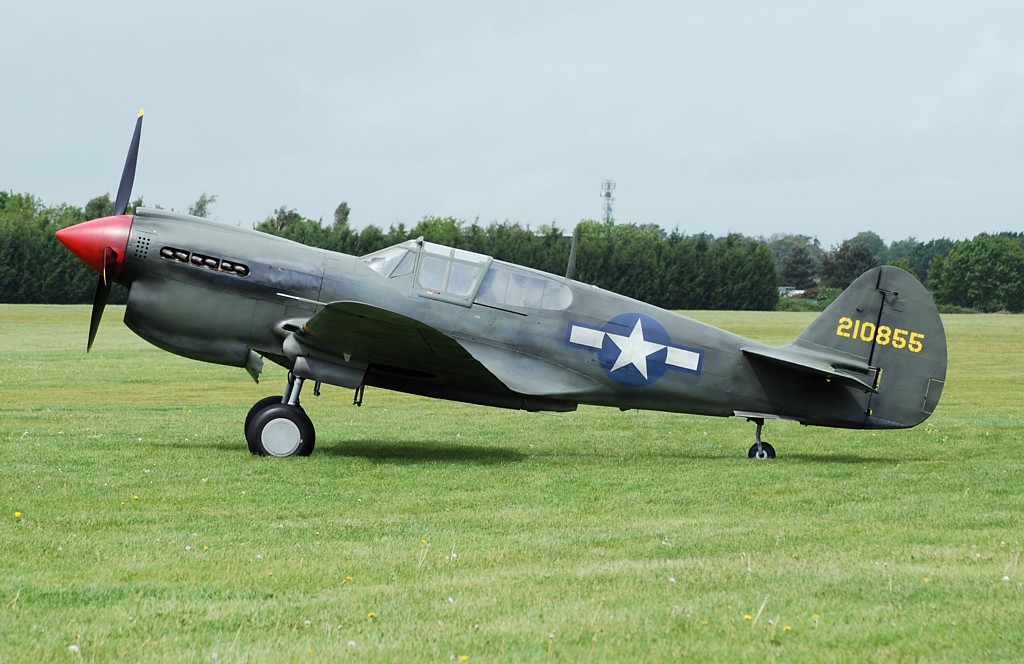
P-40 Warhawk

The squadron was first activated at Drane Field in the spring of 1944 as the 4th Fighter Reconnaissance Squadron, one of the original squadrons of the 3d Air Commando Group. After training in Florida until October, the squadron shipped overseas to the Philippines as the 4th Fighter Squadron, Commando. Under Fifth Air Force, it attacked Japanese airfields, railways and other targets in the Philippines and Taiwan and supported ground forces in the Philippines. The unit flew escort missions for attacks on Taiwan and the Chinese coast and provided top cover for ship convoys. For its actions in the liberation of the Philippines the squadron was awarded a Philippine Republic Presidential Unit Citation.

In August 1945 the squadron moved to Ie Shima and flew a few patrols over Japan before the surrender of Japan. It moved to Chitose Airfield and served with the occupation forces until inactivating in March 1946. The squadron was disbanded in October 1948 while inactive.

=== Vietnam War ===
The squadron was activated again at Eglin Air Force Base Auxiliary Airfield#9 (Hurlburt Field), Florida on 1 July 1963 as the 604th Fighter Squadron, Commando. Its parent, the 1st Air Commando Wing was in the process of expanding from a group in response to the United States Air Force's expansion of special operations forces in the face of insurgencies in Southeast Asia. The squadron was inactivated in November 1964.

The 604th was redesignated the 604th Air Commando Squadron, Fighter and activated again at England Air Force Base, Louisiana in January 1967. The squadron was equipped with the Cessna A-37 Dragonfly, testing the plane's suitability for combat in project Combat Dragon. This project had been inspired by the dwindling availability of Douglas A-1 Skyraiders, which had been performing the special operations attack mission. After training until July, the squadron moved to Bien Hoa Air Base to continue testing the A-37 in combat. Although initially assigned to the 14th Air Commando Wing the unit was operationally part of the 3d Tactical Fighter Wing while stationed in Vietnam.

At Bien Hoa, the squadron was nicknamed the "Mattel Marauders" by the pilots of the 3d wing's larger North American F-100 Super Sabre pilots. The squadron flew its first combat mission on 15 August 1967, only three months after receiving its first A-37. The slower speed at which the Dragonfly delivered its ordnance gave it improved accuracy and its small size made it a more difficult target for enemy antiaircraft defenses. The test of the A-37A ended in December 1967. In addition to close air support, the squadron flew forward air control missions during the test. Once the test was complete, the unit continued to engage in combat, later flying the improved A-37B. until being inactivated on 30 September 1970 as the Air Force discontinued its combat units at Bien Hoa in preparation to transfer the base to the Republic of Vietnam Air Force.

== Lineage ==
- Constituted as the 4th Fighter Reconnaissance Squadron on 25 April 1944

Activated on 1 May 1944
Redesignated 4th Fighter Squadron, Commando on 2 June 1944
Inactivated on 25 March 1946

- Disbanded on 8 October 1948
- Reconstituted, redesignated 604th Fighter Squadron, Commando and activated on 15 April 1963 (not organized)

Organized on 1 July 1963
Discontinued and inactivated on 8 November 1964

- Redesignated 604th Air Commando Squadron, Fighter on 16 January 1967 and activated (not organized)

Organized on 25 January 1967

- Redesignated 604th Special Operations Squadron on 1 August 1968

Inactivated on 30 September 1970

=== Assignments ===
- 3d Air Commando Group: 1 May 1944 – 25 March 1946
- Tactical Air Command: 15 April 1963 (not organized)
- 1st Air Commando Wing: 1 July 1963 – 8 November 1964
- Tactical Air Command: 16 January 1967 (not organized)
- United States Air Force Tactical Fighter Weapons Center, 25 January 1967
- 14th Air Commando Wing: 15 November 1967 (attached to 3d Tactical Fighter Wing)
- 3d Tactical Fighter Wing: March 1970 – 30 September 1970

=== Stations ===
- Drane Field, Florida, 1 May 1944
- Alachua Army Air Field, Florida, 21 August 1944
- Drew Field, Florida, 6 October 1944 – 27 October 1944
- Leyte, Philippines 5 January 1945
- Mangaldan, Luzon, Philippines, 26 January 1945
- Laoag, Luzon, Philippines, 15 April 1945
- Ie Shima, Ryukyu Islands, 9 August 1945
- Chitose Airfield, Japan. 27 October 1945 – 25 March 1946
- Eglin Air Force Base Auxiliary Airfield No. 9, Florida, 1 July 1963 – 8 November 1964
- England Air Force Base, Louisiana, 25 January 1967
- Bien Hoa Air Base, Vietnam, 28 July 1967 – 30 September 1970

=== Aircraft ===
- Curtiss P-40 Warhawk, 1944
- North American P-51 Mustang, 1944–1946
- Unknown, 1963–1964 (probably Douglas A-1 Skyraider or North American AT-28 Trojan)
- Cessna A-37A Dragonfly, 1967–1970

=== Awards and campaigns ===
| Award streamer | Award | Dates | Notes |
|---|---|---|---|
| | Presidential Unit Citation | 6 March 1968-30 July 1968 | 604th Air Commando Squadron |
| | Presidential Unit Citation | 31 July 1968-31 July 1969 | 604th Special Operations Squadron |
| | Air Force Outstanding Unit Award w/Combat "V" Device | 21 January 1970-30 September 1970 | 604th Special Operations Squadron |
| | Philippine Republic Presidential Unit Citation | December 1944-4 July 1945 | 4th Fighter Squadron, Commando |
| | Vietnamese Gallantry Cross with Palm | 9 May 1967 [sic]-30 September 1970 | 604th Air Commando Squadron |
| | Vietnamese Gallantry Cross with Palm | 31 July 1968-30 September 1970 | 604th Special Operations Squadron |
| | Vietnamese Gallantry Cross with Palm | 1 May 1970-30 September 1970 | 604th Special Operations Squadron |

| Campaign Streamer | Campaign | Dates | Notes |
|---|---|---|---|
| | Air Offensive, Japan | 5 January 1945 – 2 September 1945 | 4th Fighter Squadron, Commando |
| | China Defensive | 5 January 1945 – 4 May 1945 | 4th Fighter Squadron, Commando |
| | Western Pacific | 5 January 1945 – 2 September 1945 | 4th Fighter Squadron, Commando |
| | Leyte | 5 January 1945 – 1 July 1945 | 4th Fighter Squadron, Commando |
| | Luzon | 5 January 1945 – 4 July 1945 | 4th Fighter Squadron, Commando |
| | Ryukus | 26 March 1945 – 2 July 1945 | 4th Fighter Squadron, Commando |
| | China Offensive | 5 May 1945 – 2 September 1945 | 4th Fighter Squadron, Commando |
| | World War II Army of Occupation (Japan) | 3 September 1945 – 25 March 1946 | 4th Fighter Squadron, Commando |

== See also ==
- List of Douglas A-1 Skyraider operators
- List of United States Air Force fighter squadrons
- List of United States Air Force special operations squadrons
