= Rollins, Georgia =

Unincorporated community in Georgia, U.S.

Coordinates: 33°51′57″N 84°54′08″W

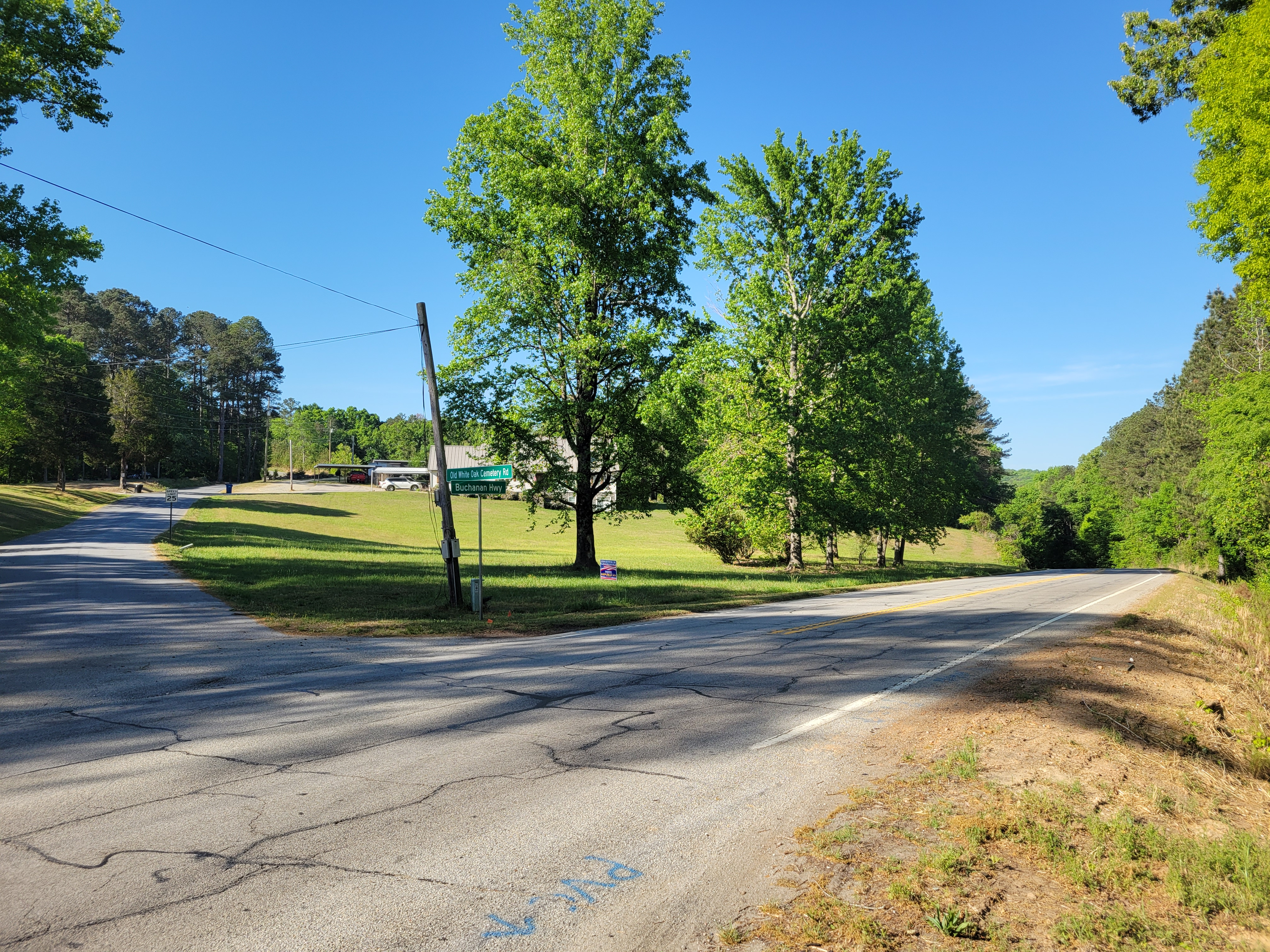
Georgia State Route 120

Rollins is an unincorporated community in Paulding County, in the U.S. state of Georgia.

== History ==
A post office called Rollins was established in 1882, and remained in operation until 1903. W. L. Rollins, an early postmaster, gave the community his last name.
