= Rollen Henry Anthis =

United States Air Force general

- Born: December 4, 1915; Navina, Oklahoma
- Died: August 19, 1995 (aged 79); Oklahoma
- Military career
- Allegiance: United States of America
- Branch: United States Air Force
- Service years: 1938–1973
- Rank: Major general
- Nicknames: Mr. COIN Air; Buck
- Commands: Seventeenth Air Force; Air Force Logistics Command; Headquarters Command; 2d Air Division
- Conflicts: World War II; Vietnam War
- Awards: Distinguished Service Medal; Legion of Merit (4); Air Medal; Army Commendation Medal (3); Alawite Medal of the Third Order; Medal of Independence

Major General Rollen Henry Anthis (December 4, 1915 – August 19, 1995) was an officer in the United States Air Force (USAF) who served as commanding general of the Seventeenth Air Force, Air Force Logistics Command, Headquarters Command and the 2d Air Division. He retired from the USAF in 1973.

== Early life ==
Anthis was born in Navina, Oklahoma, on 4 December 1915. He graduated from El Reno High School in 1933, attended Oklahoma Military Academy and studied law at the University of Oklahoma.

== Military career ==
In 1938 he became a flying cadet at Randolph Field, Texas. He was commissioned a second lieutenant in the U.S. Army Air Corps in 1939 and received his pilot wings at Kelly Field, Texas. he was assigned first to the 3rd Attack Group at Barksdale Field, Louisiana. In 1940, he became a test pilot for the Douglas A-20 Havoc attack bomber at Patterson Field, Ohio and later at Langley Field, Virginia. He became engineering officer for the 80th Bombardment Squadron at Manchester Air Base, New Hampshire in June 1941. Selected as one of the original pilots for the U.S. Army Air Forces Ferrying Command, he became commander of the 14th Ferrying Squadron at Long Beach, California, in July 1942. He was one of the few "unlimited card" pilots of the ferrying command who were authorized to fly at their own discretion and during adverse conditions. He then became commander of Palm Springs Army Air Base, California. In 1943 he took command of the 4th Fighter Operational Training Unit in Brownsville, Texas. A year later he was assigned to Marrakesh, Morocco, as commander of the 1257th Air Base Unit. This organization was a prime support activity for "Mission 17," the Yalta Conference. In 1945 he became commander of the 1252nd Air Base Unit at Casablanca, Morocco, with additional duty as deputy commander of the Air Transport Command, North African Division.

In 1947 he was assigned as assistant chief of staff, Headquarters Air Transport Command, Washington, D.C. He attended the third class of the Air War College. Following graduation in 1949, he remained at the War College as a faculty member until 1952. From May 1952 until September 1955, he was assigned to North Africa as commander, 1603rd Air Transport Wing, United States Air Forces in Europe (USAFE). He was a key participant in concluding base rights negotiations with the Libyan Government. His next assignment was to Headquarters USAF in October 1955 as deputy chief, Operations Control Division and later as chief, Manpower Division in the Office of the Deputy Chief of Staff for Operations. He attended the National War College at Fort McNair, Washington, D.C. from August 1958 to June 1959. After graduation he became vice commander, Thirteenth Air Force, Clark Air Base, the Philippines.

In November 1961 Anthis was assigned to South Vietnam in the dual role of commander for the then 2nd Advanced Echelon, later the 2d Air Division and chief of the Air Force Section to the Military Assistance Advisory Group. As 2nd Air Division commander he was responsible for all USAF operations in Vietnam and Thailand including Operation Farm Gate, as a result Anthis became known as "Mr. COIN Air" after the abbreviation for counterinsurgency. In February 1964, he was assigned to the Joint Chiefs of Staff as special assistant for counterinsurgency and special activities. Anthis assumed command of Headquarters Command, USAF in January 1966.

Anthis became commander of the Seventeenth Air Force, USAFE, then headquartered at Ramstein Air Base, West Germany, in December 1967. He also served as commander of Allied Sector III, Air Defense, Fourth Allied Tactical Air Force headquartered at Börfink, West Germany. Anthis assumed duties as chief of staff, Combined Military Planning Staff, Central Treaty Organization, Ankara, Turkey, in July 1969. In December 1971 he was assigned as assistant to the commander, Air Force Logistics Command at Wright-Patterson Air Force Base. On 1 August 1972 he began serving as senior member, United Nations Command, Military Armistice Commission, Korea. He retired from the USAF on 1 May 1973.

== Later life and death ==
Anthis was a member of the First Christian Church in El Reno, Oklahoma, he was also a member of the Masons, Elks, Lambda Chi Alpha fraternity, and the Air Force Association. He died of cancer on August 19, 1995.

== Awards and decorations ==
Anthis's military decorations include the Distinguished Service Medal, Legion of Merit with three oak leaf clusters, Air Medal, Army Commendation Medal with two oak leaf clusters, Alawite Medal of the Third Order (Morocceudes Consulate General French) and the Medal of Independence (Libya). He Anthis was also awarded the wings of the French Air Force, Royal Thai Air Force, Vietnamese Air Force and the Republic of Korea Air Force. In April 1964, the International Supreme Council, Order of DeMolay, awarded Anthis its Legion of Honor. He was the first recipient of the Air Force Association's Citation of Honor Award for outstanding work in counterinsurgency in Southeast Asia.
